= List of lakes of Mongolia =

The lakes in Mongolia are distributed unevenly across the country. Many, including some of the largest, can be found in the Great Lakes Depression between the Altai, Khangai and Tannu-Ola mountain ranges in the west. A second group can be found in mountain valleys throughout the country. Lake Khövsgöl in a rift valley south of the Russian Sayan Mountains has the largest volume because of its great depth. The remaining lakes found in the steppe areas and in the Gobi Desert are usually smaller and shallow.

Lakes in Mongolia cover a total area of 16,003 km^{2}. Out of the total number of lakes, 83.7% are small lakes with surface area less than 0.1 km^{2} (5.6% of the total area). There are 3,060 lakes with surface area 0.1 km^{2} and more.

Lakes with an area of more than 50 km^{2}
Rank	Name	Mongolian name	Traditional Mongolian name	Aimag	Elevation, m	Area, km^{2}	Maximum length, km	Average width, km	Maximum width, km	Average depth, m	Maximum depth, m	Volume, km^{3}
1	Uvs Lake	Увс нуур	ᠤᠪᠰᠤ ᠨᠠᠭᠤᠷ (ubsu naɣur)	Uvs	759	3,350	84	40	79	11.9	20	39.6
2	Khövsgöl Lake	Хөвсгөл нуур	ᠬᠥᠪᠰᠦᠭᠦᠯ ᠨᠠᠭᠤᠷ (köbsügül naɣur)	Khövsgöl	1,645	2,760	136	20.8	36.5	137.9	262	380.7
3	Khar-Us Lake	Хар-Ус нуур	ᠬᠠᠷ᠎ᠠ ᠤᠰᠤ ᠨᠠᠭᠤᠷ (qar-a usu naɣur)	Khovd	1,157	1,578	72.2	26	27	2.2	4.5	3.432
4	Khyargas Lake	Хяргас нуур	ᠬᠢᠷᠭᠢᠰ ᠨᠠᠭᠤᠷ (qirɣis naɣur)	Uvs	1,028.5	1,407	75	19	31	46.9	80	66.034
5	Buir Lake	Буйр нуур	ᠪᠤᠶᠢᠷ ᠨᠠᠭᠤᠷ (buyir naɣur)	Dornod	581	615	40	15	21	6.5	10.2	3.784
6	Khar Lake (Khovd)	Хар нуур	ᠬᠠᠷ᠎ᠠ ᠨᠠᠭᠤᠷ (qar-a naɣur)	Khovd	1,132	575	37	16	24	4.2	7	2.422
7	Dörgön Lake	Дөргөн нуур	ᠳᠥᠷᠭᠦᠨ ᠨᠠᠭᠤᠷ (dörgön naɣur)	Khovd	1,132	305	24	13	17	14.3	27	4.367
8	Achit Lake	Ачит нуур	ᠠᠴᠢᠲᠤ ᠨᠠᠭᠤᠷ (ačitu naɣur)	Uvs, Khovd	1,435	297	24	12	18	2.2	5	0.665
9	Böön Tsagaan Lake	Бөөн Цагаан нуур	ᠪᠥᠭᠡᠨ ᠴᠠᠭᠠᠨ ᠨᠠᠭᠤᠷ (bögen čaɣan naɣur)	Bayankhongor	1,312	252	24	11	19	9.3	16	2.355
10	Üüreg Lake	Үүрэг нуур	ᠡᠭᠦᠷᠭᠡ ᠨᠠᠭᠤᠷ (egürge naɣur)	Uvs	1,425	239	20	12	18	26.9	42	6.419
11	Telmen Lake	Тэлмэн нуур	ᠲᠡᠯᠡᠮᠡᠨ ᠨᠠᠭᠤᠷ (telemen naɣur)	Zavkhan	1,789	194	28	12	16	13.8	27	2.671
12	Ulaan Lake	Улаан нуур	ᠤᠯᠠᠭᠠᠨ ᠨᠠᠭᠤᠷ (ulaɣan naɣur)	Ömnögovi	1,008	175	-	-	-	-	-	-
13	Sangiin Dalai Lake	Сангийн Далай нуур	ᠰᠠᠩ ᠤ᠋ᠨ ᠳᠣᠭᠤᠳᠤ ᠨᠠᠭᠤᠷ (saŋ-un toluɣai naɣur)	Khövsgöl, Zavkhan	1,888	165	32	5	13	12.1	30	1.995
14	Airag Lake	Айраг нуур	ᠠᠶᠢᠷᠠᠭ ᠨᠠᠭᠤᠷ (ayiraɣ naɣur)	Uvs	1,030	143	18	9	13	5.7	10	0.820
15	Orog Lake	Орог нуур	ᠣᠷᠤᠭ ᠨᠠᠭᠤᠷ (oroɣ naɣur)	Bayankhongor	1,217	140	31.8	2	7.7	3.0	5	0.420
16	Yakhi Lake	Яхь нуур	ᠶᠠᠬᠠ ᠨᠠᠭᠤᠷ (yaqa naɣur)	Dornod	670	97	20.4	4.2	11.9	2.3	4	0.223
17	Khar Lake (Zavkhan)	Хар нуур	ᠬᠠᠷ᠎ᠠ ᠨᠠᠭᠤᠷ (qar-a naɣur)	Zavkhan	1,980	84.5	29.3	3.5	6.6	19.6	47	1.654
18	Tolbo Lake	Толбо нуур	ᠲᠣᠯᠪᠤ ᠨᠠᠭᠤᠷ (tolbo naɣur)	Bayan-Ölgii	2,080	84	21	4	7	6.8	12	0.571
19	Khurgan Lake	Хурган нуур	ᠬᠤᠷᠠᠭᠠᠨ ᠨᠠᠭᠤᠷ (quraɣan naɣur)	Bayan-Ölgii	2,072	71	23.3	3	6	7.8	28	0.537
20	Dayan Lake	Даян нуур	ᠳᠠᠶᠠᠨ ᠨᠠᠭᠤᠷ (dayan naɣur)	Bayan-Ölgii	2,232	67	18	4	9	2.3	4	0.157
21	Dood Tsagaan Nuur	Доод Цагаан нуур	ᠳᠣᠣᠷᠠᠳᠤ ᠴᠠᠭᠠᠨ ᠨᠠᠭᠤᠷ (dooradu čaɣan naɣur)	Khövsgöl	1,538	64	18	4	7	6.0	14	0.384
22	Bayan Lake	Баян нуур	ᠪᠠᠶ᠋ᠠᠨ ᠨᠠᠭᠤᠷ (bayan naɣur)	Zavkhan	1,491	64	14	5	8	21.7	50	1.390
23	Khar-Us Lake (Uvs)	Хар-Ус нуур	ᠬᠠᠷ᠎ᠠ ᠤᠰᠤ ᠨᠠᠭᠤᠷ (qar-a usu naɣur)	Uvs	1,574	63	19	5	7.8	5.2	8.2	0.3265
24	Oigon Lake	Ойгон нуур	ᠣᠶᠢᠭᠠᠨ ᠨᠠᠭᠤᠷ (oyiɣan naɣur)	Zavkhan	1,664	61	18	3	8	3.4	8	0.207
25	Terkhiin Tsagaan Lake	Тэрхийн Цагаан нуур	ᠲᠡᠷᠬᠢᠶ ᠤᠨ ᠴᠠᠭᠠᠨ ᠨᠠᠭᠤᠷ (terkiy-un čaɣan naɣur)	Arkhangai	2,060	61	16	4	6	6.0	20	0.369
26	Khoton Lake	Хотон нуур	ᠬᠣᠲᠤᠩ ᠨᠠᠭᠤᠷ (qotuŋ naɣur)	Bayan-Ölgii	2,084	50	22	2.3	4	26.8	58	1.341
