= Ulaankhus =

District in Bayan-Ölgii Province, Mongolia

Coordinates: 49°02′23″N 89°26′21″E

Ulaankhus District Улаанхус сум ᠤᠯᠠᠭᠠᠩᠬᠤᠰᠤᠰᠤᠮᠤ
- District
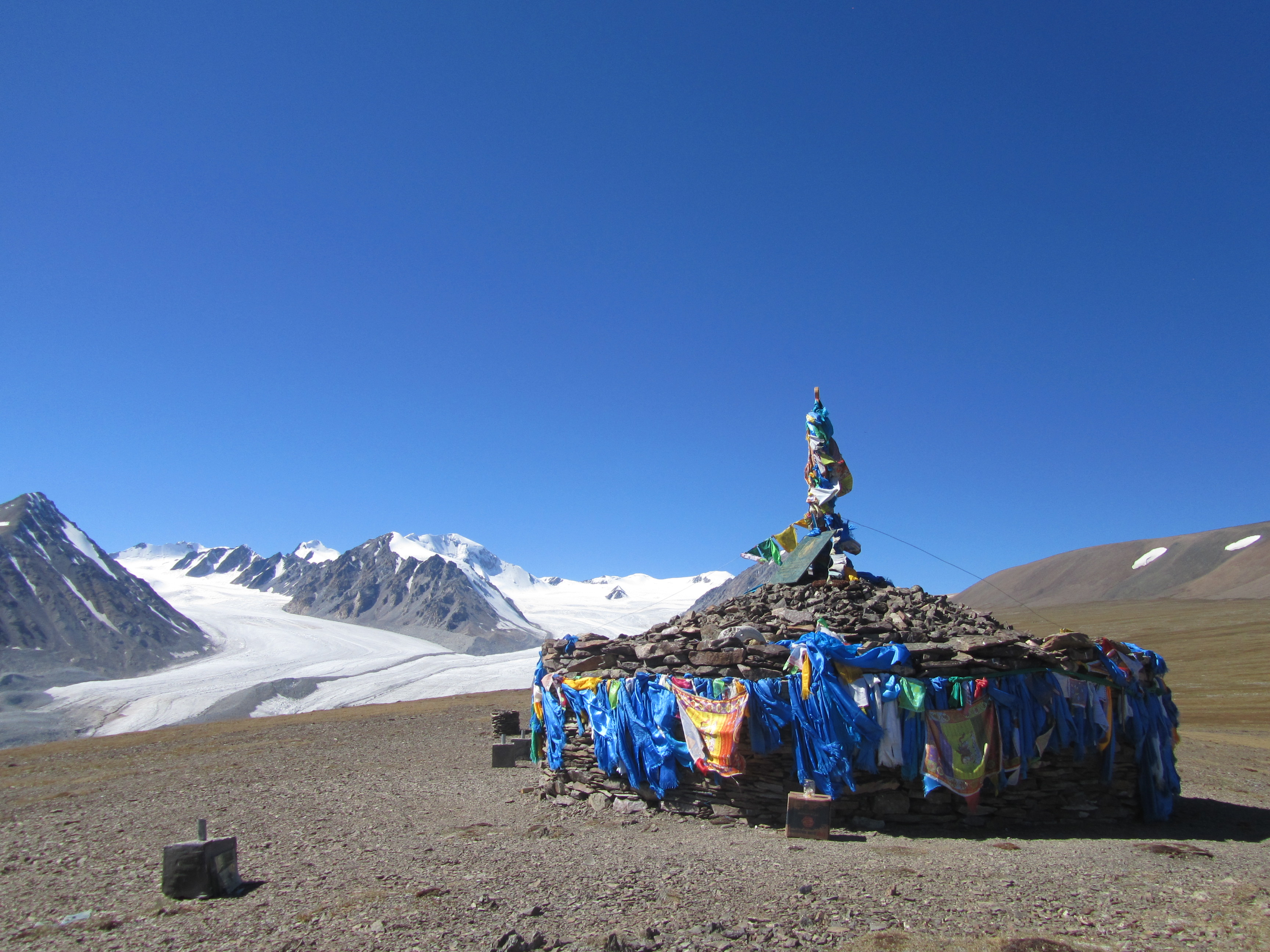

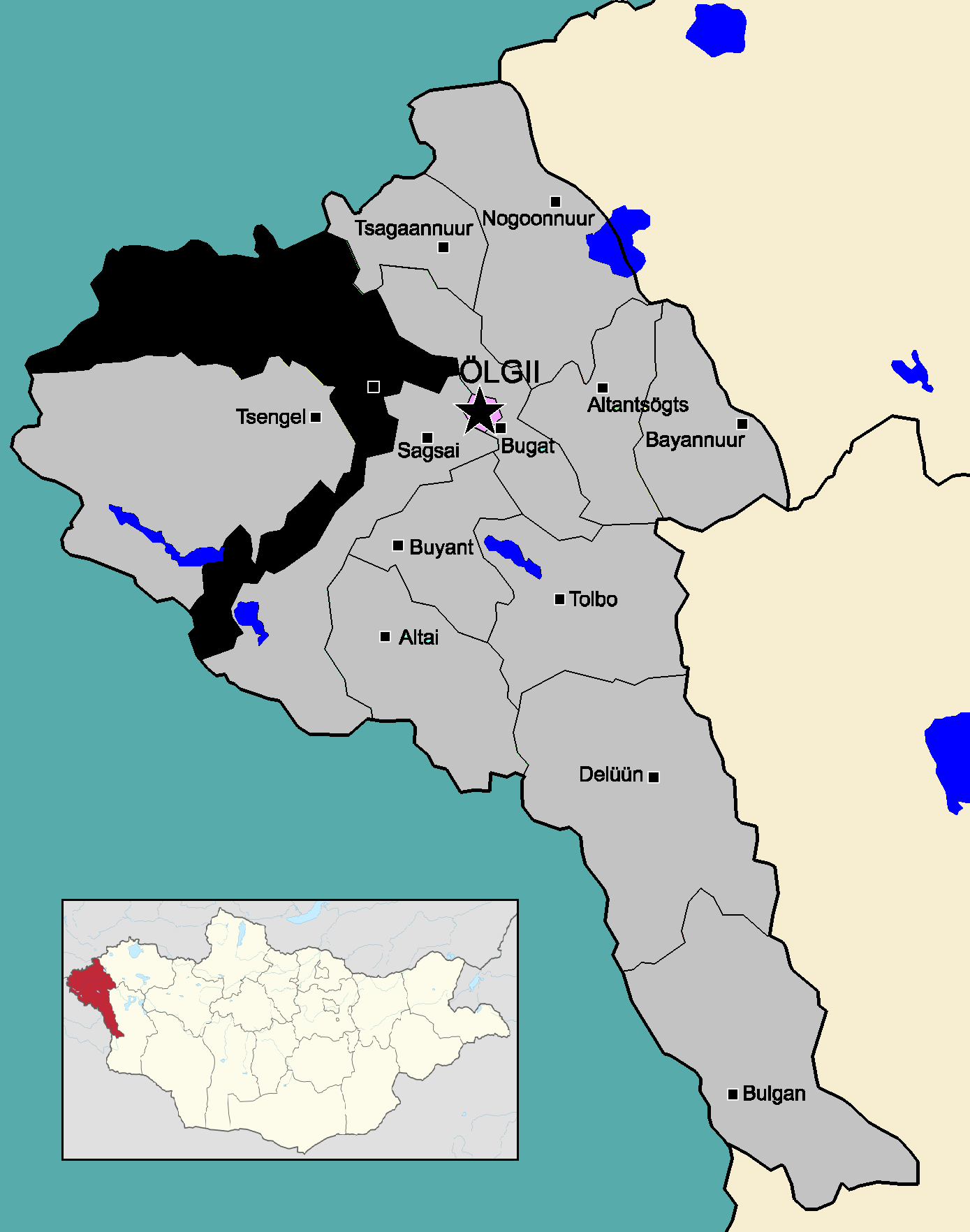
- Location of Ulaankhus in Bayan-Ölgii Province (highlighted in black within the light grey area, which in turn is highlighted red within Mongolia in the window.)
- Country: Mongolia
- Province: Bayan-Ölgii Province

Area
  - Total: 6,047.93 km^{2} (2,335.12 sq mi)

Population (2014)
  - Total: 8,010
- Time zone: UTC+7 (UTC + 7)

Ulaankhus (Mongolian: Улаанхус [ʊɮáɴχʊs]) is a district of Bayan-Ölgii Province in western Mongolia. The seat of the district is Bilüü, situated 46 kilometres (29 mi) west of Ölgii, and 1,682 kilometres (1,045 mi) from Ulaanbaatar. It is primarily inhabited by ethnic Kazakhs. As of 2014, it had a population of 8,010.

== History ==
Historically, Ulaankhus was settled by Kazakhs who moved to the northern side of the Altai Mountains. In 1922, Sherushy khoshuun with the canter in Akbalshyk, currently Bilüü, was established. In 1922, it was split into Sherushy and Shebaraigyr, and in 1925 into Sherushy, Shebaraigyr, Botakara, and Zhantekey. These khoshuuns belonged to Khovd Province. In 1938, Sherushy khoshuun was renamed Ulaankhus sum. In 1940, Bayan-Ölgii Province was established, and the sum was subordinated to this province.

== Geography ==
Ulaankhus sum borders the Altai Republic of Russia to the north, Tsagaannuur to the northeast, Bugat to the east, Sagsai to the southeast, Altay Prefecture of Xinjiang, China to the southwest, and Tsengel to the west. The sum is covered by hills and mountains, with 90% of the area lying at altitudes above 2,500 metres (8,200 ft). The highest point is the Besbogda Mountain (4,374 metres (14,350 ft)).

The sum contains the Tsengel Khairkhan mountain, with an elevation of 3,967 metres (13,015 ft). The Khovd River flows through the district, flowing through the town of Bilüü.

== Administrative divisions ==
The district is divided into 11 bags, which are:

- Bayanzurkh
- Biluu-1
- Biluu-2
- Dayan
- Ikh Oigor
- Khukh Adar
- Khukh Khutul
- Khuljaa
- Mongol Gol
- Sogoog
- Ulaan Ereg

== Landmarks ==
Bilüü contains the Nurbergen Supermarket, a branch of the Khan Bank, a small stadium, a hotel, a school and a hospital.

== Culture ==
More than 60 Pazyryk culture burials were discovered in Ulaankhus and Tsengel sums during an expedition in 2004. The area contains numerous rock paintings of hunters.
