= Golden Eagle Festival =

Traditional Mongolian festival

- Golden Eagle Festival
- Genre: Folk, cultural festival
- Purpose: Celebrating traditional Kazakh eaglehunting heritage
- Frequency: Biannually
- Location: Bayan-Ölgii Province
- Countries: Mongolia
- Years active: 27
- Inaugurated: October 1999
- Participants: ~100 eagle hunters

The Golden Eagle Festival (Mongolian: Бүргэдийн баяр, Kazakh: Бүркіт той) is an annual cultural festival held in Bayan-Ölgii Province, the westernmost province of Mongolia. Organized by the Mongolian Eagle Hunter's Association, it celebrates the traditions of Kazakh eagle hunters (bürkitshi) who train and hunt with golden eagles. Competitions are held to showcase eagle handling skills, as well as traditional Kazakh dress and horsemanship. Events take place both in central Ölgii, the provincial capital, and on the nearby steppe, approximately 4 kilometres (2.5 mi) outside the town.

Starting from 2010, the festival has been held twice a year, with the main autumn event held in October and spring event in March. The latter event, the Spring Golden Eagle Festival, is organized near Ulaanbaatar.

Prizes are awarded for categories such as best eagle at hunting prey, best eagle responding to its handler, and best presentation of traditional attire. Other events include eagle parade, horse racing, archery, and bushkashi, a horseback tug-of-war using a goatskin.

== History ==
Kazakh eagle hunter showing off his horsemanship and skills during the Golden Eagle Festival, October 2018

The first Golden Eagle Festival was organized and held by the Mongolian Eagle Hunter's Association, in Bugat, Bayan-Ölgii in October 1999. Since the inaugural event, it has been organized at various levels by the Mongolian Eagle Hunter's Association, the provincial government, tourism companies, and agencies.

In 2010, falconry was registered to the Representative List of the Intangible Cultural Heritage of Humanity by UNESCO. Since 2010, the event has been held twice a year; one in Autumn held in Bayan-Ölgii and another one in early Spring near Ulaanbaatar, the capital of Mongolia. The spring festival is held at Chinggis Khaan Khuree Tourist Complex in early March, prior to the Kazakh celebration of Nauruz in late March.

In 2016, the festival was nominated by the Ministry of Culture as the best organized event in the country. In 2017, it was reported that around 600 eagle hunters were registered in Mongolia.

Scholars and practitioners have debated the impact of tourism on eagle hunting traditions. Researchers such as Lauren McGough and Joseph Recupero have documented concerns about the commercialization of the festival, the rise of “hand-raised” eagles used for tourism rather than hunting, and shifting motivations among younger eagle hunters.

== Similar events ==
=== Sagsai Golden Eagle Festival ===
The Sagsai Golden Eagle Festival takes place annually in 17–18 September in Sagsai district, Bayan-Ölgii. Sagsai is noted to be the area with the highest amount of eagle hunters. Held earlier than the Golden Eagle Festival, it most recently garnered 80 participants in 2026, having been popular with photographers and journalists. The event has been organized and held by the local government, eagle hunters' association alongside "Ayan Travel" LLC.

== Gallery ==
Kokpar games at the Sagsai Golden Eagle Festival, 2017

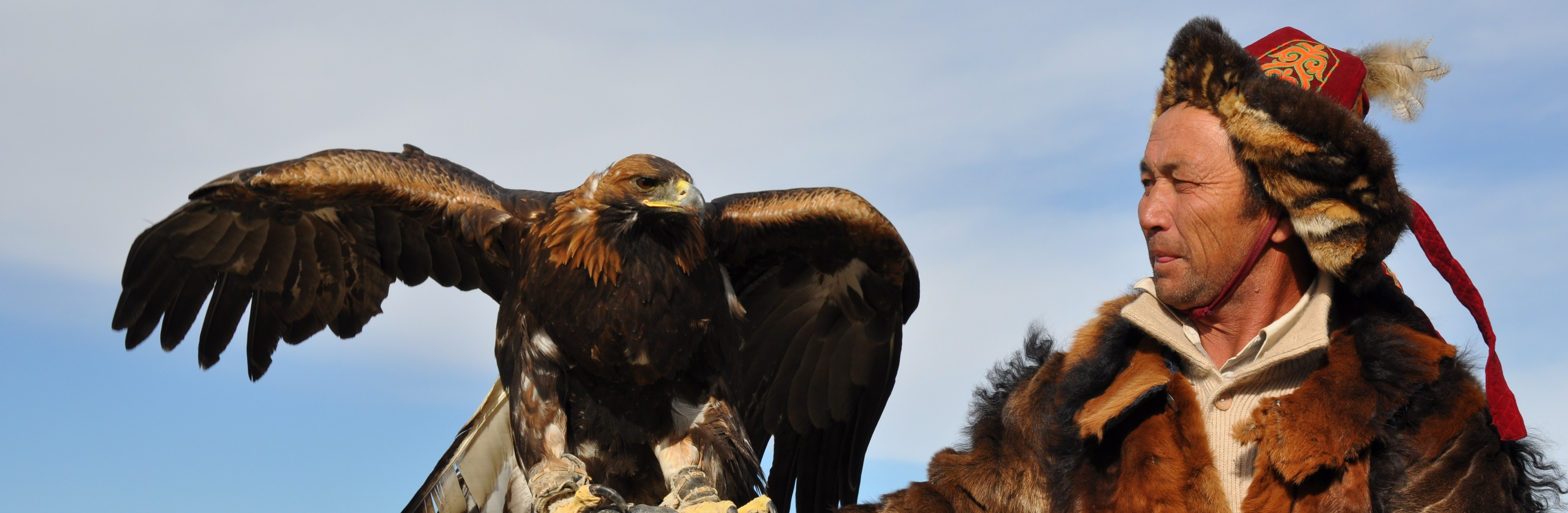
Kazakh eagle hunter in Ölgii, October 2012

Eagle hunters during the Golden Eagle Festival, 2019

Kazakh eagle hunters at the Golden Eagle Festival, 2011

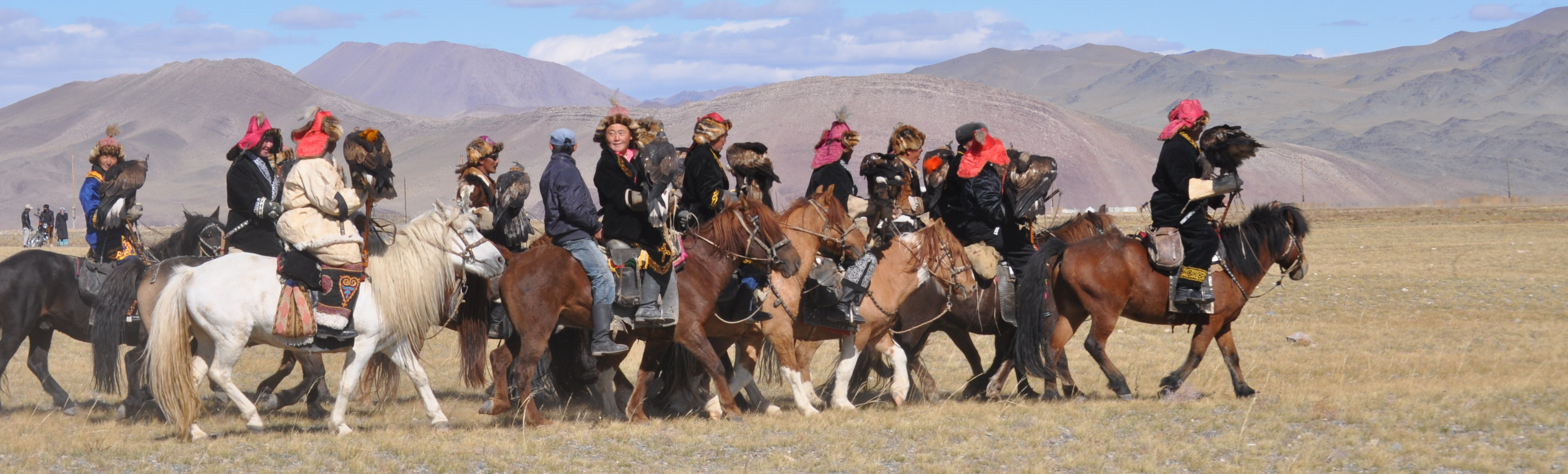
Eagle hunters' parade during the Festival, 2011

During the Spring Golden Eagle Festival, March 2022

== In media ==
The festival was prominently featured in the 2016 documentary The Eagle Huntress, which followed 13-year-old Aisholpan, reportedly the first girl to participate and win in the competition. The film drew international attention to the festival, though aspects of its marketing and portrayal have been critiqued for historical inaccuracy.

== See also ==
- Tourism in Mongolia
- Hunting with eagles
