= Altai, Bayan-Ölgii =

District in Bayan-Ölgii Province, Mongolia

Altai District Алтай сум ᠠᠯᠲᠠᠢᠰᠤᠮᠤ
- District
- Location in Mongolia
- Coordinates: 48°18′08″N 89°30′55″E
- Country: Mongolia
- Province: Bayan-Ölgii Province

Area
  - Total: 1,221.46 sq mi (3,163.56 km^{2})

Population (2014)
  - Total: 3,983
- Time zone: UTC+7
- Website: altai.bo.gov.mn

Altai (Mongolian: Алтай [ɐɬtʰɛ́ː]) is a district of Bayan-Ölgii Province in western Mongolia. As of 2014, it had a population of 3,983.

== History ==
Altai sum was established on February 12, 1959, by the Decree of the Presidium of the MPC of the Mongolian People's Republic. It formerly belonged to Jargalant and Sagsai, then both of Khovd Province.

== Geography ==
The centre of the district, Chikhertei, lies 115 kilometres (71 mi) west of Ölgii. To the southwest of the town is the lake, Darihan Nuur.

== Administrative divisions ==
The district is divided into five bags, which are:

- Khar Nuur
- Ulaan Khad
- Bardam
- Chikhertei
- Borburgas

== Economy ==
The main occupation in the district is agriculture. As of 2015 there were 120,650 livestock, consisting of 10,251 cattle, 57,106 sheep, 6,159 horses, 46,737 goats and 397 camels. 7620 tonnes of hay is harvested each year. The locals grows vegetables such as potatoes. 21 small business entities operated in the district as of 2015. Electricity has been provided in Altai since 2001 thanks to the establishment of a 10 kW hydropower substation, though only 50% of households have sewerage.
