= Bayannuur =

Bayannuur, Bayannur, or Bayinnur ( Mongolian: Баян-нуур, Mongolian: rich lake) may refer to:

== Mongolia ==
- several Sums (districts) in different Aimags (provinces), Mongolia
  - Bayannuur, Bayan-Ölgii
  - Bayannuur, Bulgan
- Bayan Lake, a lake in Zavkhan Province

== China ==
- Bayannur, a prefecture-level city in Inner Mongolia
- Bayannur, Sonid, a town in Sonid Left Banner, Inner Mongolia
- Bayannur, Horqin, a sum (Township) in Horqin Right Middle Banner, Inner Mongolia
- Bayinnur, Otog, (Chinese: 巴音淖尔乡) a Township in Otog Banner, Inner Mongolia
