= Khurgan Lake =

Lake in Tsengel, Bayan-Ölgii, Mongolia

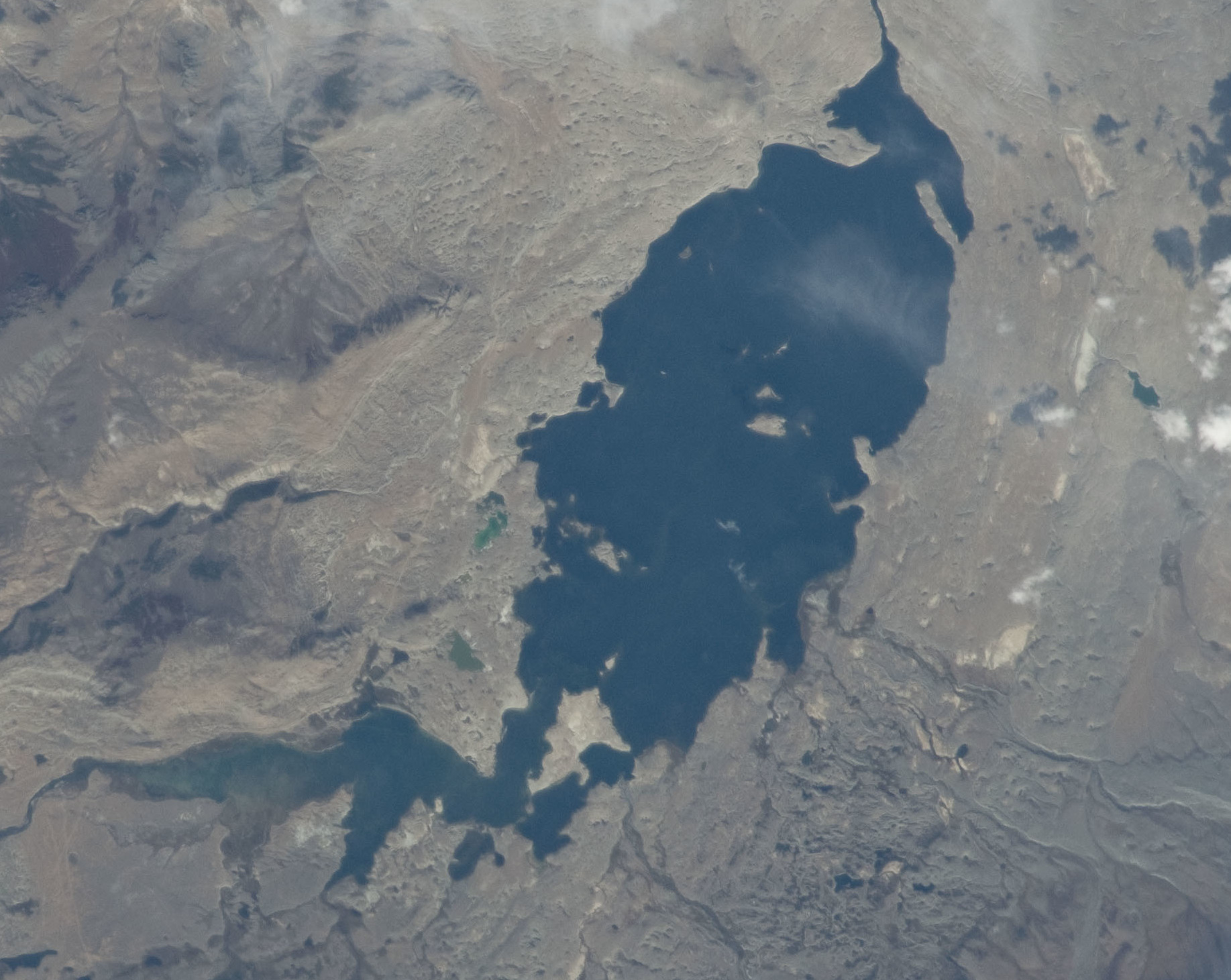
- View of lake taken during ISS Expedition 28

- Location within Mongolia
- Location: Bayan-Ölgii Province, Mongolia
- Coordinates: 48°32′46″N 88°36′22″E
- Primary inflows: Khovd River
- Basin countries: Mongolia
- Max. length: 23.3 km (14.5 mi)
- Max. width: 6 km (3.7 mi)
- Surface area: 71 km^{2} (27 sq mi)
- Average depth: 7.8 m (26 ft)
- Max. depth: 28 m (92 ft)
- Water volume: 0.537 km^{3} (435,000 acre⋅ft)
- Surface elevation: 2,072 m (6,798 ft)

Khurgan Lake (Mongolian: Хурган нуур) is a lake located in Tsengel District, Bayan-Ölgii Province, Mongolia.

The lake is connected to Khoton Lake by a wide and short channel (about 2 km (1 mi)); both, together with the Dayan Lake, feed the Khovd River. Khurgan Lake is located within the Altai Tavan Bogd National Park.

On Khurgan lake, there are up to twenty islands, some of which are up to 30 meters high. They were formed by moraines.

== Climate ==
The climate is cold. The average temperature is -4 °C. The warmest month is July, at 14 °C, and the coldest is December, at -24 °C. The average rainfall is 278 millimeters per year. The wettest month is July, with 55 millimeters of rain, and the driest is February, with 6 millimeters.
