= Tsengel Khairkhan =

Tsengel Hairhan
- Location within Mongolia

Highest point
- Elevation: 3,943 m (12,936 ft)
- Prominence: 1,359 m (4,459 ft)
- Listing: Ribu
- Coordinates: 48°38′51″N 89°9′22″E

Geography
- Location: Ulaankhus, Bayan-Ölgii Province, Mongolia
- Parent range: Mongol-Altai Mountains

Tsengel Hairhan (Mongolian: Цэнгэл хайрхан, lit. 'delight holy mountain') is a mountain of the Altai Mountains and located in the Bayan-Ölgii Province in Mongolia. It has elevation of 3,943 m (12,841 ft) and the one of 13 high mountains with glaciers in Mongol-Altai mountain range.
