= The Eagle Huntress =

- Theatrical release poster
- Directed by: Otto Bell
- Produced by: Otto Bell; Sharon Chang; Stacey Reiss; Morgan Spurlock; Daisy Ridley
- Starring: Aisholpan Nurgaiv
- Narrated by: Daisy Ridley
- Cinematography: Simon Niblett
- Edited by: Pierre Takal
- Music by: Jeff Peters
- Production companies: Kissaki Films; Stacey Reiss Productions; Shine Global
- Distributed by: Sony Pictures Classics (Select territories); Altitude Film Distribution (United Kingdom)
- Release dates: 24 January 2016 (Sundance); 2 November 2016 (United States); 16 December 2016 (United Kingdom)
- Running time: 87 minutes
- Countries: Mongolia; United Kingdom; Kazakhstan; United States
- Languages: Kazakh, English
- Box office: $4.4 million

The Eagle Huntress is a 2016 internationally co-produced Kazakh-language documentary feature film directed by Otto Bell and narrated by executive producer Daisy Ridley. It follows the story of Aisholpan Nurgaiv, a 13-year-old Kazakh girl from Mongolia, as she attempts to become the first female eagle hunter to compete in the Golden Eagle Festival at Ölgii, Mongolia.

== Synopsis ==
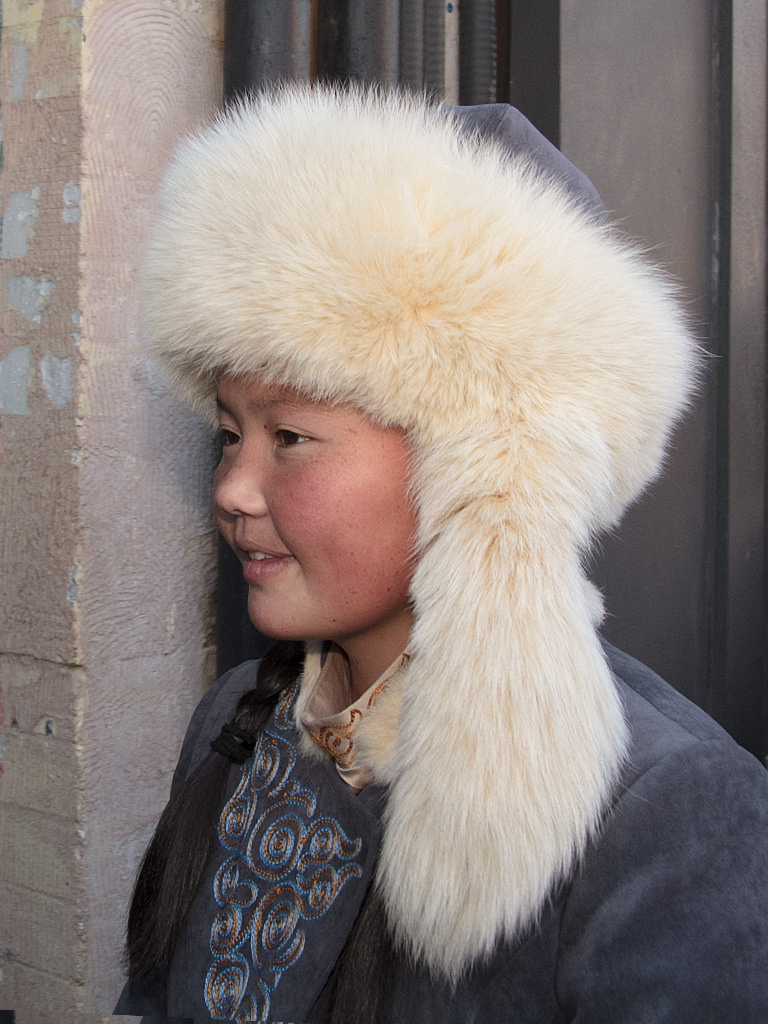
Aisholpan at TIFF in 2016

The Eagle Huntress follows the story of Aisholpan, a 13-year-old Kazakh girl from Mongolia, as she attempts to become the first female eagle hunter to compete in the Eagle Festival at Ölgii, Mongolia, established in 1999. She belongs to a family of nomads who spend their summers in a ger in the Altai Mountains and their winters in a house in town. The men in her family have been eagle hunters for seven generations, and she wants to follow in their footsteps.

With her father Nurgaiv's help, she learns how to train golden eagles and then captures and trains her own eaglet. Although she faces some disbelief and opposition within the traditionally male sport, she becomes the first female to enter the competition at the annual Golden Eagle Festival. She ends up winning the competition, and her eaglet breaks a speed record in one of the events.

After the competition, she takes the final step toward becoming an eagle hunter by traveling with her father to the mountains in the winter to hunt foxes, braving snowy conditions and extreme cold. After some initial misses, her eaglet successfully kills its first fox, and she returns home.

== Production ==
The film was directed by Otto Bell and narrated by executive producer Daisy Ridley.

The film's dialogue is in Kazakh; the narration is in English.

=== Music ===
The film's soundtrack features the original song "Angel by the Wings" by Sia, which was released worldwide on 2 December 2016.

== Release ==
The Eagle Huntress premiered at the 2016 Sundance Film Festival, where it was purchased by Sony Pictures Classics for North and Latin America, Germany, Australia, New Zealand, Scandinavia and Asia, and Altitude Film Distribution for the UK. Following the film's premiere, co-executive producer Daisy Ridley agreed to add narration, comprising approximately five minutes' total time in the 87-minute film. Director Otto Bell said of Ridley, "Like so many other theatergoers around the world, I was blown away by Daisy's recent portrayal of an empowered female protagonist [Rey in The Force Awakens]. I'm thrilled she'll be bringing that same energy to supporting a real-world heroine who is also on an epic journey to win victory in a faraway land."

== Reception ==
The documentary was a New York Times Critics' Pick and an LA Times Critics' Pick. Chief Film Critics at The New York Times, Manohla Dargis and A. O. Scott, called the film "a bliss out" and "a movie that expands your sense of what is possible", respectively. On review aggregator website Rotten Tomatoes, the film has a 94% approval rating based on 126 reviews with an average rating of 7.41/10. The website's critics consensus states: "Effectively stirring and bolstered by thrilling visuals, The Eagle Huntress uses its heartwarming message to fill up a feature that might have made for an even more powerful short film." Metacritic reports a 72 out of 100 score based on 20 reviews, indicating "generally favorable reviews".

The film was shortlisted for an Academy Award for Best Documentary Feature but was ultimately not nominated. It was nominated for the BAFTA Award for Best Documentary.

=== Criticism ===
Aisholpan describes the opposition she faced in her own words in the film. Some reviewers and researchers felt that the documentary overstated the amount of opposition Aisholpan faced as a female eagle hunter and that the early promotion of the film included an ethnocentric description of the Kazakh eagle hunting culture as being one of "ingrained misogyny". After historical evidence and facts were published about nomadic steppe women participating in training eagles to hunt from antiquity to the present day, the filmmakers corrected their early reports placed in media outlets that Aisholpan was "the first" Kazak woman in the world hunting with an eagle.

A 2014 article by a volunteer consultant on the film, Dennis Keen, suggested that the achievements of women in Aisholpan's region were "dismissed by nearly every prominent falconer in Central Asia" because they represented "a serious disturbance in how things are done." A March 2014 article in a Kazakhstan government-owned news source, Egemen Qazaqstan, noted famous eagle huntress Makpal Abrazakova, who started her engagement in eagle falconry at age 13 and before Aisholpan was born, reported that when she had wanted to participate in eagle hunting, her father had taken her to the slopes of the Alatau mountains and introduced her to the eagle hunters there, and she was well-treated by them, including the gift of an eaglet for her to train and hunt with. In an article on the Russian news site Vremya in February 2013 by Nadezhda Plyaskina, interviewed another pre-Aisholpan Kazakh female eagle falconer, Akbota Bagashar: "Among the athletes, we notice a young hunter with a bird on her hand. "Are you participating too? " we ask the girl. "Yes," answers sixteen-year-old Akbota BAGASHAR . "This is my second competition." My grandfather is a berkutchi, and I've always gone hunting with him since I was a child. A year ago, I tamed a chick myself, and now I hunt with it."

In 2023, Al Jazeera published an article by Asha Tanna, in which she quotes an 80-year-old eagle hunter named Ajken Tabysbek's opinion on the film, that it was a publicity stunt, saying, "She did it for the cameras. Women do not hunt today". Historian Adrienne Mayor, author of a paper on the subject, is quoted:

Eagle hunting always included women... I worry that the proliferation of young, fake "eagle huntresses" posing with tame eagles for photographers and tourists is already erasing the real history of eagle hunting by women. It is a shame that the blame for this situation originated with a professional photographer and a filmmaker who decided to make Aisholpan famous for their own gain.

== Legacy ==
Aisholpan stated her desire to study medicine and become a doctor. The filmmakers made Aisholpan and her family "profit participants" in the documentary and established a fund to help pay for Aisholpan's higher education. They also donated the $3,000 prize money they received from winning Best Documentary at the Hamptons International Film Festival to this fund.
