= Tsagaan Salaa petroglyphs =

Archaeological site in Mongolia

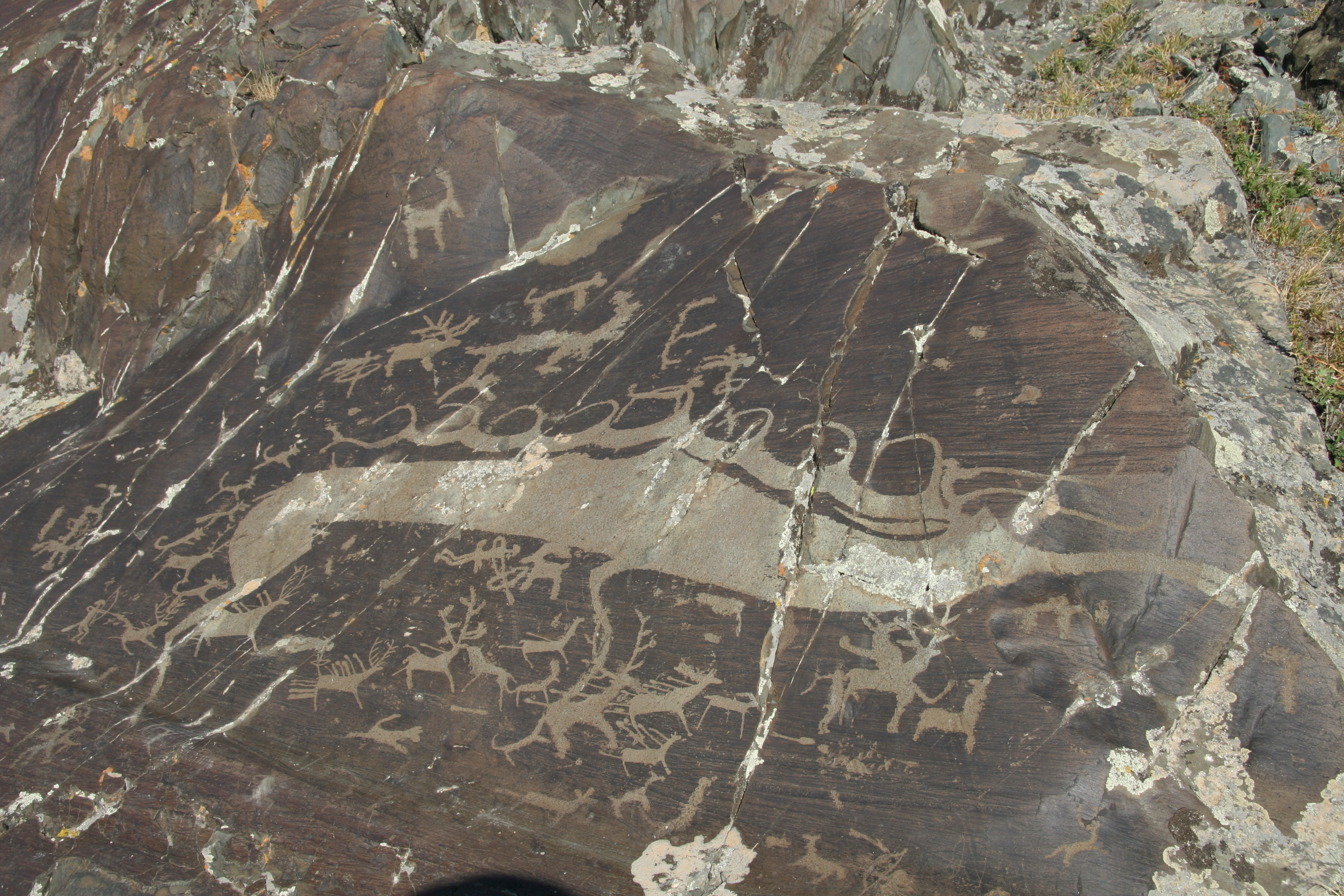
Petroglyph at Tsagaan Salaa

The rock art site of Tsagaan Salaa is located in the Altai Mountains of western Mongolia, inside Altai Tavan Bogd National Park.

Within an area of roughly 15 km^{2} reside approximately 10,000 figures on the southern side of the White River Valley. Dating from the Neolithic to the Bronze Age, this massive collection of pictorials primarily depicts livestock and big game both individual and in large herds.

These rock paintings are rich not only in their numbers, but also in meanings, expressiveness, subject and compositions. They are important monuments of the art of the transition from ancient hunter-gatherer societies to livestock breeding and the beginning of the classic nomad economy in Mongolia.

In 2011, the Altai rock art sites of Tsagaan Salaa, Upper Tsagaan Gol, and Aral Tolgoi were inscribed on the World Heritage List.
