= Delüün =

District in Bayan-Ölgii Province, Mongolia

Coordinates: 47°52′01″N 90°42′02″E

Delüün District Дэлүүн сум ᠳᠡᠯᠢᠭᠦᠨᠰᠤᠮᠤ
- District
- Interactive map of Delüün District
- Country: Mongolia
- Province: Bayan-Ölgii Province

Area
  - Total: 5,594.99 km^{2} (2,160.24 sq mi)

Population (2014)
  - Total: 6,994
- Time zone: UTC+7 (UTC + 7)

Delüün (Mongolian: Дэлүүн) is a sum (village) of Bayan-Ölgii Province in western Mongolia. It is primarily inhabited by ethnic Kazakhs. It´s named for Deluun River, a source of the Buyant River. As of 2014 it had a population of 6,994 people.

== Administrative divisions ==
The district is divided into 12 bags, which are:

- Tal Nuur
- Angirlag
- Khar Uul
- Chikhertei
- Rashaant
- Buga
- Khukh Serkh
- Burged
- Khukh Tolgoi
- Khuiten Nuur
- Khviten Buir
- Shine Ail

== Economy ==
The district is home to the Buraat tungsten deposit, which is owned by Dream Land LLC.
