= Ölgii =

Ölgii (Mongolian: Өлгий) most commonly refers to:

- Ölgii (city), the capital of Bayan-Ölgii Province
- Ölgii, Uvs, a district of Uvs Province
- Bayan-Ölgii Province, a province of Mongolia

Ölgii may also refer to:

== Companies ==
- Ölgii Oil LLC, an oil distributor company in Ölgii, Bayan-Ölgii, Mongolia

== Locations ==
- Ölgii Peak, a peak of the Tavan Bogd Mountain
- Ölgii Airport, the airport in Ölgii (city)
- Ölgii Bridge, a bridge in Ölgii city
- Ölgii Bus Terminal, a bus terminal in Ölgii city
