= Hunting with eagles =

Traditional form of falconry practised by the Kazakhs and the Kyrgyz

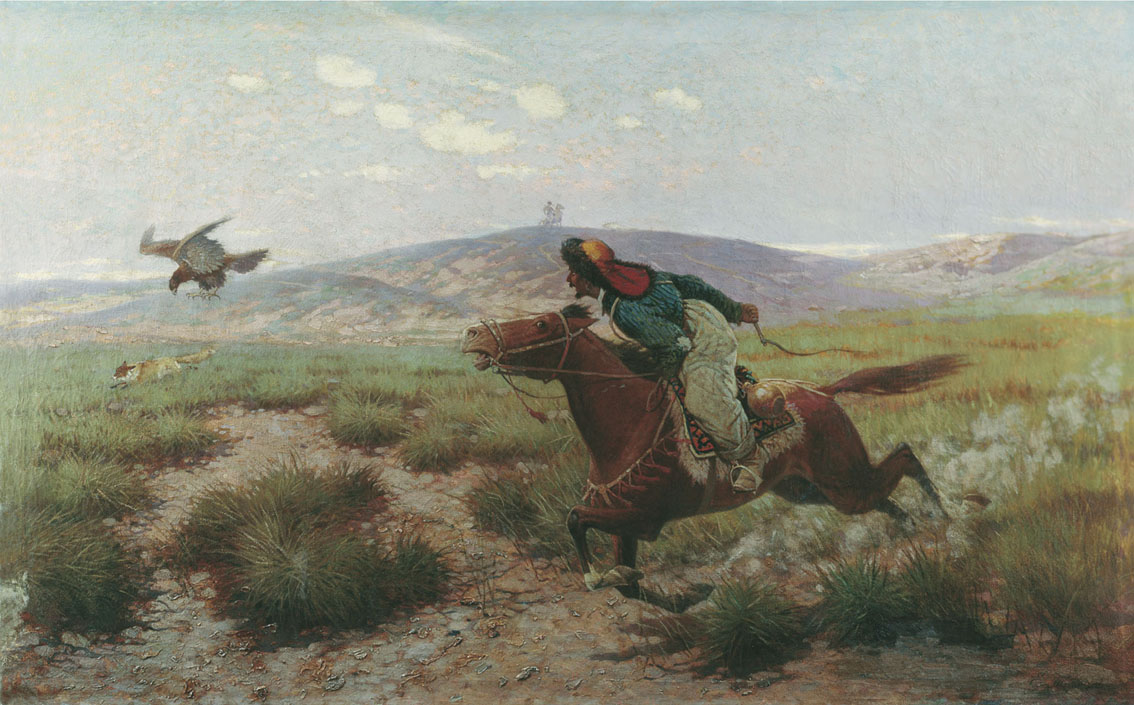
Falconers in Kazakhstan hunting foxes with a golden eagle, before 1932

Hunting with eagles (Eagle hunting) is a traditional form of falconry found throughout the Eurasian Steppe, practiced by ancient Khitan and Turkic peoples. Today it is practiced by Kazakhs and the Kyrgyz in contemporary Kazakhstan and Kyrgyzstan, as well as diasporas in Bayan-Ölgii, Mongolia, and Xinjiang, China. Though they are most famous for hunting with golden eagles, they have also been known to train northern Eurasian goshawks, peregrine falcons, saker falcons, and more.

== Terminology ==
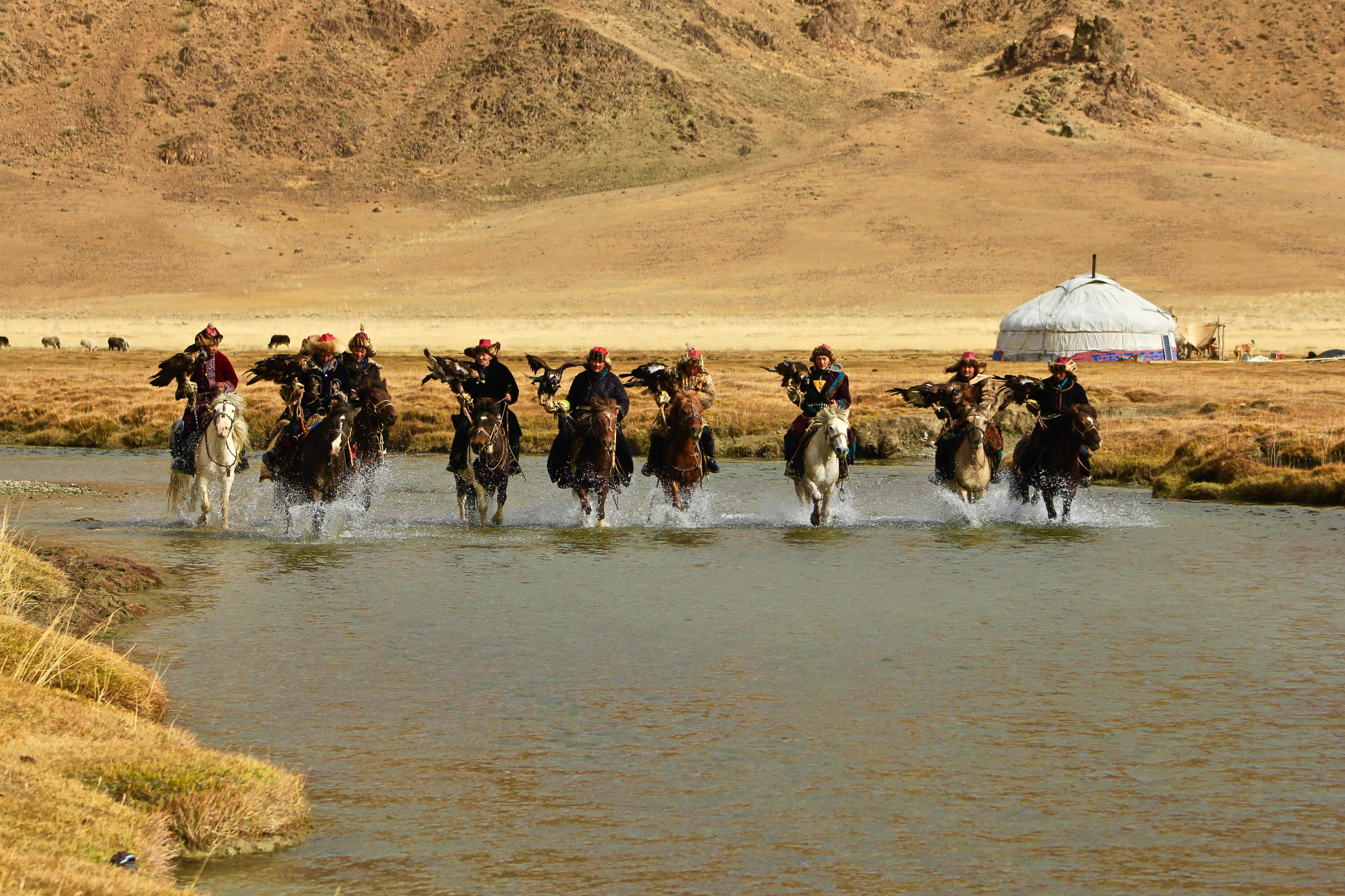
Golden Eagle Festival in Mongolia

In both Kazakh and Kyrgyz, there are separate terms for those who hunt with birds of prey in general, and those who hunt with eagles.

In Kazakh, both qusbegi and sayatshy refer to falconers in general. Qusbegi comes from the words qus ("bird") and bek ("lord"), thus literally translating as "lord of birds." In Old Turkic, kush begi was a title used for the khan's most respected advisors, reflecting the valued role of the court falconer. Sayatshy comes from the word sayat ("falconry") and the suffix -shy, used for professional titles in Turkic languages. The Kazakh word for falconers that hunt with eagles is bürkitshi, from bürkit ("golden eagle"), while the word for those that use goshawks is qarshyghashy, from qarshygha ("goshawk").

In Kyrgyz, the general word for falconers is münüshkör. A falconer who specifically hunts with eagles is a bürkütchü, from bürküt ("golden eagle").

== History ==
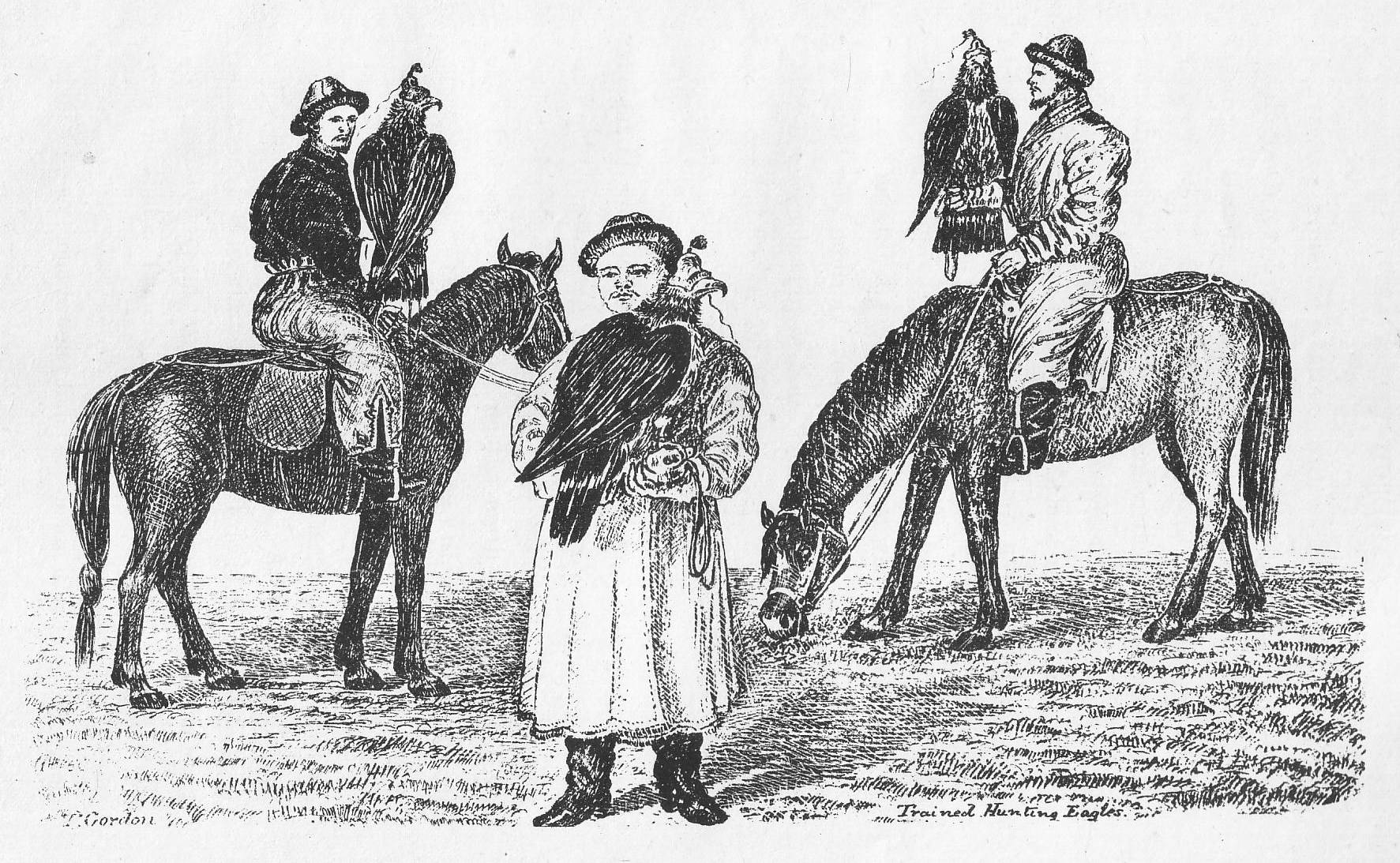
1870s illustration of golden eagle falconers in Kazakhstan

=== Güktürks ===
In Old Turkic, kush begi was a title used for the khan's most respected advisors, reflecting the valued role of the court falconer.

=== Khitans ===
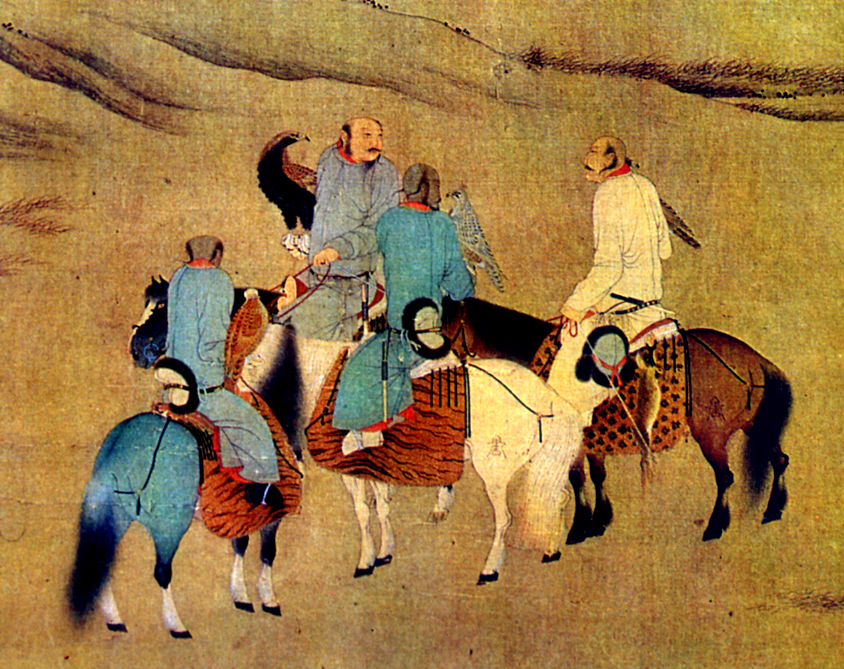
Song dynasty painting of Khitan eagle hunters on horse, 10th century

In 936-45 AD the Khitans, a nomadic people from Manchuria who spoke a Para-Mongolic language, conquered part of north China. In 960 AD China was conquered by the Song dynasty. From its beginnings, the Song dynasty was unable to completely control the Khitan who had already assimilated much of Chinese culture. Throughout its 300-year rule of China, the Song dynasty had to pay tribute to the Khitan to keep them from conquering additional Song dynasty territory. Despite the fact that the Khitans assimilated Chinese culture, they retained many nomadic traditions, including eagle hunting.

=== Kyrgyz ===
In 1207, the Kyrgyz nomads surrendered to Genghis Khan's son Jochi. Under Mongol rule, the Kyrgyz preserved their nomadic culture as well as eagle falconry traditions. Archaeologists trace back falconry in Central Asia to the first or second millennium BC.

=== Kazakhs in Mongolia ===
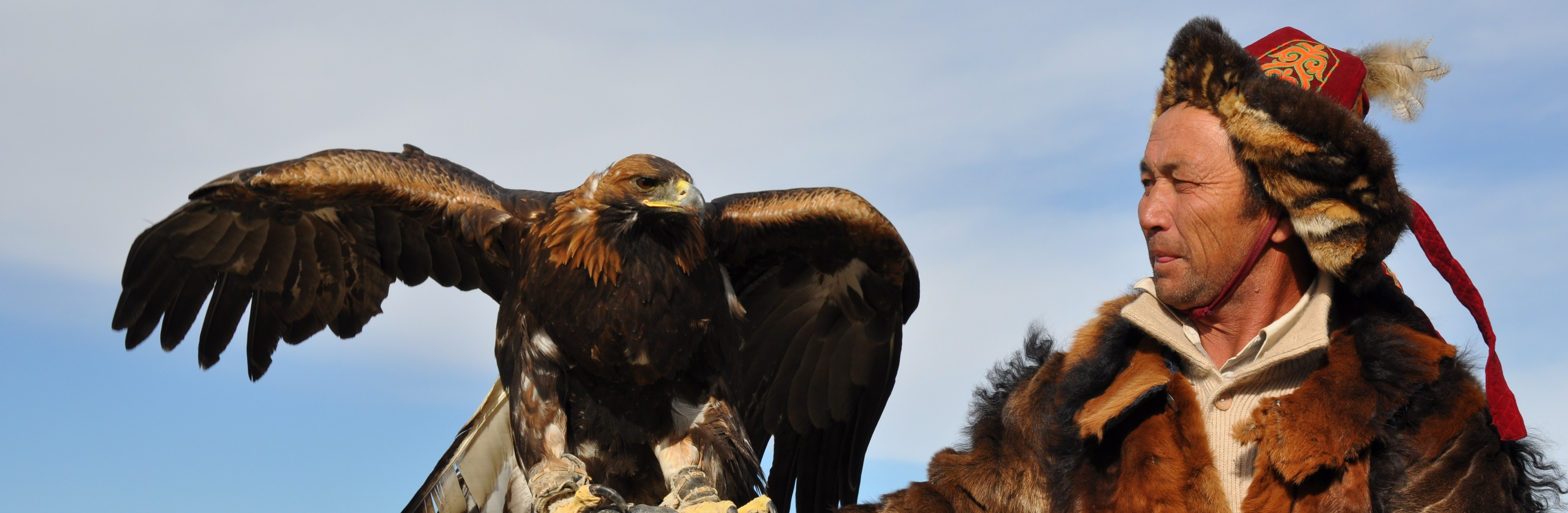
Kazakh eagle hunter in Altai Tavan Bogd National Park, Mongolia.

During the communist period in Kazakhstan, many Kazakhs fled for Mongolia to avoid being forced to abandon their nomadic lifestyle and sent to collective farms. They settled in Bayan-Ölgii Province and brought with them their tradition of hunting with eagles. There are an estimated 250 eagle hunters in Bayan-Ölgii, which is located in the Altai Mountains of western Mongolia. Their falconry custom involves hunting with golden eagles on horseback, and they primarily hunt red foxes and corsac foxes. They use eagles to hunt foxes and hares during the cold winter months when it is easier to see the gold-colored foxes against the snow. Each October, Kazakh eagle hunting customs are displayed at the annual Golden Eagle Festival. Although the Kazakh government has made efforts to lure the practitioners of these Kazakh traditions back to Kazakhstan, most Kazakhs have remained in Mongolia.

== See also ==
- Ethnic groups in Chinese history
- Falconry
- Goryeo-Khitan Wars
- Kazakh Steppe
- Kyrgyzstan
- History of Mongolia
- The Eagle Huntress
- Wolf hunting
- Gopro: Eagle Hunters in a New World (2017 album)
