= Tolbo =

District in Bayan-Ölgii Province, Mongolia

Coordinates: 48°24′47″N 90°17′13″E

Tolbo District Толбо сум ᠲᠣᠯᠪᠤ ᠰᠤᠮᠤ
- District
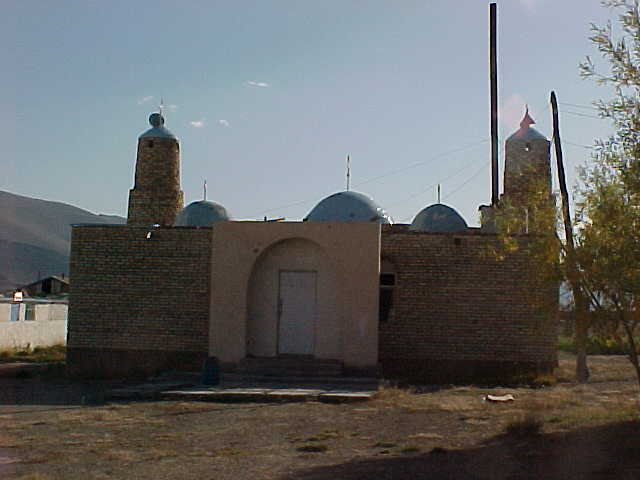
- The mosque in the administrative center of the Tolbo sum
- Interactive map of Tolbo District
- Country: Mongolia
- Province: Bayan-Ölgii Province

Area
  - Total: 2,974.69 km^{2} (1,148.53 sq mi)

Population (2014)
  - Total: 8,372
- Time zone: UTC+7 (UTC + 7)

Tolbo (Mongolian: Толбо, Stain) is a sum (district) of Bayan-Ölgii Province in western Mongolia. It is primarily inhabited by ethnic Kazakhs. As of 2021 it had a population of 8,372 people.

A large saline lake, Tolbo Lake, is located in the district, just north of the sum center. The lake was the site of the Battle of Tolbo Lake (1921) during the Russian Civil War where Bolsheviks and Mongolian allies defeated an army of White Russians.

== Administrative divisions ==
The district is divided into six bags, which are:

- Buraat
- Duruu Nuur
- Khongor Ulun
- Khosh
- Khukh Tolgoi
- Tolbo Nuur
