= Buyant, Bayan-Ölgii =

District in Bayan-Ölgii Province, Mongolia

Coordinates: 48°34′45″N 89°33′00″E

Buyant District Буянт сум ᠪᠤᠶᠠᠨᠲᠤᠰᠤᠮᠤ
- District
- Interactive map of Buyant District
- Country: Mongolia
- Province: Bayan-Ölgii Province
- Established: 1942

Area
  - Total: 1,845.67 km^{2} (712.62 sq mi)
- Elevation: 1,950 m (6,400 ft)

Population (2025)
  - Total: 2,771
- Time zone: UTC+7 (UTC + 7)

Buyant (Mongolian: Буянт, lit. 'Virtuous')) is a sum (district) of Bayan-Ölgii Province in western Mongolia. It is primarily inhabited by the Altai Uriankhai people, an Oirat Mongol subgroup. As of 2025, it has a population of 2,771 people.

== History ==
Before the Mongolian Revolution of 1921, modern-day Buyant belonged to the Züün Garyn Amban Khoshuu (Left-Wing Amban Banner), one of the seven historical banners of the Altai Uriankhai. Following the revolution, the area became part of Altai Uriankhai Province in 1923, and was later divided into Jargalant-Sagsai sum in 1925, and Nar Mandakh sum in 1929. Buyant briefly fell under Khovd Province in the 1930s, before joining Bayan-Ölgii Province when it was first established in 1940. Buyant was formally established as an independent administrative sum on March 10, 1942.

== Administrative divisions ==
The district is divided into four bags, which are:

- Khökh Ereg (Хөх эрэг)
- Khööltsööd (Хөөлцөөд)
- Shar Tokhoi (Шар тохой)
- Ömnögol (Өмнөгол)
