= Altantsögts =

District in Bayan-Ölgii Province, Mongolia

Coordinates: 49°03′42″N 90°27′16″E

Altantsögts District Алтанцөгц сум ᠠᠯᠲᠠᠨᠴᠥ᠋ᠭᠦᠴᠡᠰᠤᠮᠤ
- District
- Interactive map of Altantsögts District
- Country: Mongolia
- Province: Bayan-Ölgii Province

Area
  - Total: 1,786.10 km^{2} (689.62 sq mi)

Population (2014)
  - Total: 2,684
- Time zone: UTC+7 (UTC + 7)

Altantsögts (Mongolian: Алтанцөгц, Golden tsogts) is a sum (district) of Bayan-Ölgii Province in western Mongolia. It is primarily inhabited by ethnic Kazakhs. As of 2014 it had a population of 2684 people.

== Administrative divisions ==
The district is divided into four bags, which are:

- Bayan-bulag
- Khash
- Tsagaantunge
- Ulaankhargana
