= Angel by the Wings =

Single by Sia

from the album The Eagle Huntress soundtrack
- Released: 2 December 2016
- Length: 5:19
- Label: Monkey Puzzle Records
- Songwriter(s): Sia Furler, Greg Kurstin
- Producer(s): Greg Kurstin

Sia singles chronology
"Never Give Up" (2016)	"Angel by the Wings" (2016)	"Move Your Body" (2017)

Audio video
- "Angel by the Wings" on YouTube

"Angel by the Wings" is a song by Sia, from the Otto Bell documentary film, The Eagle Huntress soundtrack.

== Background and release ==
The song was reported by Billboard in January 2016 as being specifically written and recorded by Sia for the "coming-of-age film" which premiered at the Sundance Film Festival on 24 January 2016. Otto Bell said:

I'm incredibly grateful that Sia took the time to write and record this very special song. It's a wonderful vote of confidence for our documentary. I could not have imagined a more fitting, timeless piece of music for the film – it's such a beautiful girl power anthem!

The single was released on 2 December 2016.

== Critical reception ==
Gil Kaufman from Billboard described the song as "inspirational" and "appropriately soaring" to complement the story in the film.

Ben Kaye from Consequence of Sound described the song as "one of booming empowerment and triumph, with a simple but effective refrain of, 'You can do anything.'"

== Charts ==
Chart (2016)	Peak position
Australian Digital Tracks (ARIA)	29
New Zealand Heatseekers (RMNZ)	6
