= Altai Tavan Bogd National Park =

National park in Bayan-Ölgii, Mongolia

- Mongolian: Алтай Таван богд ᠠᠯᠲᠠᠢᠲᠠᠪᠤᠨᠪᠣᠭᠳᠠ
- IUCN category II (national park)
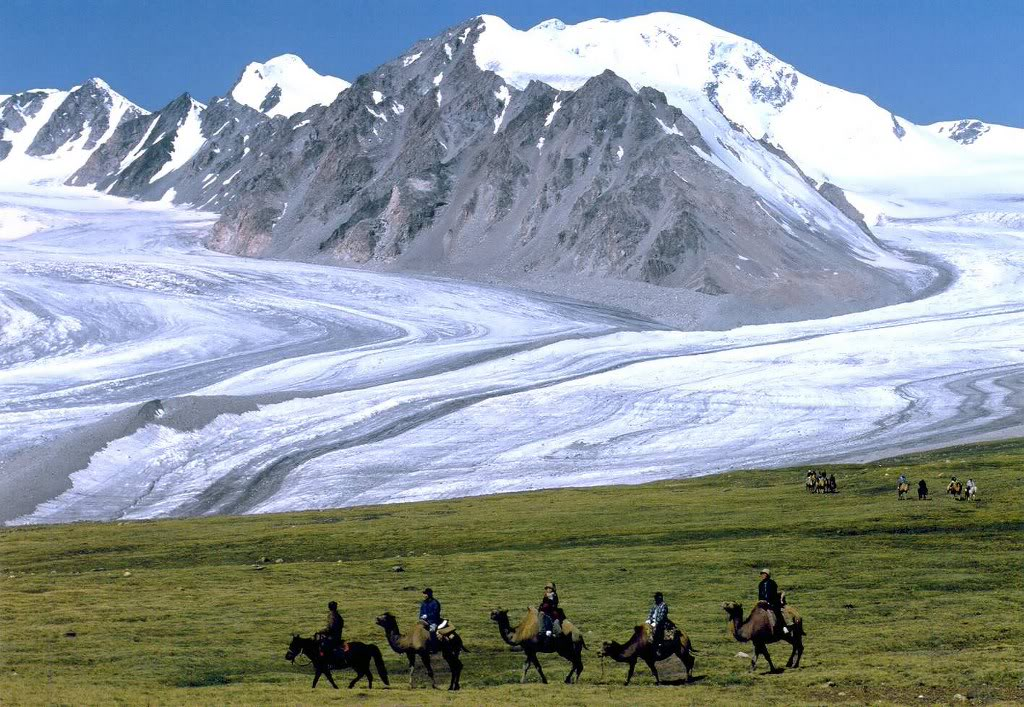
- Tavan Bogd Mountain

- Location within Mongolia
- Location: Bayan-Ölgii Province, Bayan-Ölgii, Mongolia
- Nearest city: Ölgii (city)
- Coordinates: 48°33′N 88°37′E
- Area: 6,362 square kilometres (2,456 sq mi)
- Established: 1996
- Governing body: Ministry of Environment and Green Development of Mongolia

Altai Tavan Bogd National Park (Mongolian: Алтай Таван богд байгалийн цогцолбор газар, ᠠᠯᠲᠠᠢᠲᠠᠪᠤᠨᠪᠣᠭᠳᠠᠪᠠᠶᠢᠭᠠᠯ ᠤᠨᠴᠣᠭᠴᠠᠯᠠᠪᠤᠷᠢᠭᠠᠵᠠᠷ Altai five saints nature complex) is a national park in Bayan-Ölgii Province of western Mongolia. The park includes the Mongolian side of the Tavan Bogd massif, which is divided by the triple border with Russia and China in the Altai Mountains.

It covers 6362 square kilometres and is located south of Tavan Bogd, the highest mountain of Mongolia. It includes the lakes Khoton, Khurgan, and Dayan. The protected area is inhabited by species such as the Argali sheep, Ibex, Red deer, Beech marten, Moose, Snow leopard, Snow cock, and Golden eagle.

The (UNESCO) World Heritage Site Petroglyphic Complexes of the Mongolian Altai is located inside Altai Tavan Bogd National Park. The World Heritage Site covers three locations with several thousand petroglyphs and Turkic monoliths, including the Tsagaan Salaa Rock Paintings with over 10,000 cave drawings in 15 km of river valley.

Map of park borders, Altai Tavan Bogd

== See also ==
- List of national parks of Mongolia
