= Tolbo Lake =

Lake in Tolbo, Bayan-Ölgii Province, Mongolia

- Location within Mongolia
- Location: Mongolia
- Coordinates: 48.56°N 90.05°E
- Type: freshwater lake
- Surface area: 185 square kilometres (71 sq mi)
- Surface elevation: 2,080 meters (6,820 ft)

Tolbo Lake (Mongolian: Толбо нуур, ᠲᠣᠯᠪᠤ ᠨᠠᠭᠤᠷ. Kazakh: Толбо көлі, تولبو كولى) is a freshwater lake in Tolbo, Bayan-Ölgii Province, Mongolia. The lake is located about 50 kilometres (30 mi) south of Ölgii, on the main road between Ölgii and Khovd.

Elevation is at 2,080 meters (6,820 ft) high. The shoreline is treeless with few mosquitoes and a lot of people and families camp here every summer. Most of the people go there in mid-July because the water at that time is the warmest. Tolbo lake is also known as 100 kazan(100 pots). The reason why is the lake has 100 deep places that are just like pots. And the Tolbo Lake has become the place that most people go to camp or just to swim.

The lake covers 185 square kilometers of land.

The lake was the site of the Battle of Tolbo Lake during the Russian Civil War where Bolsheviks and Mongolian allies defeated an army of White Russians.

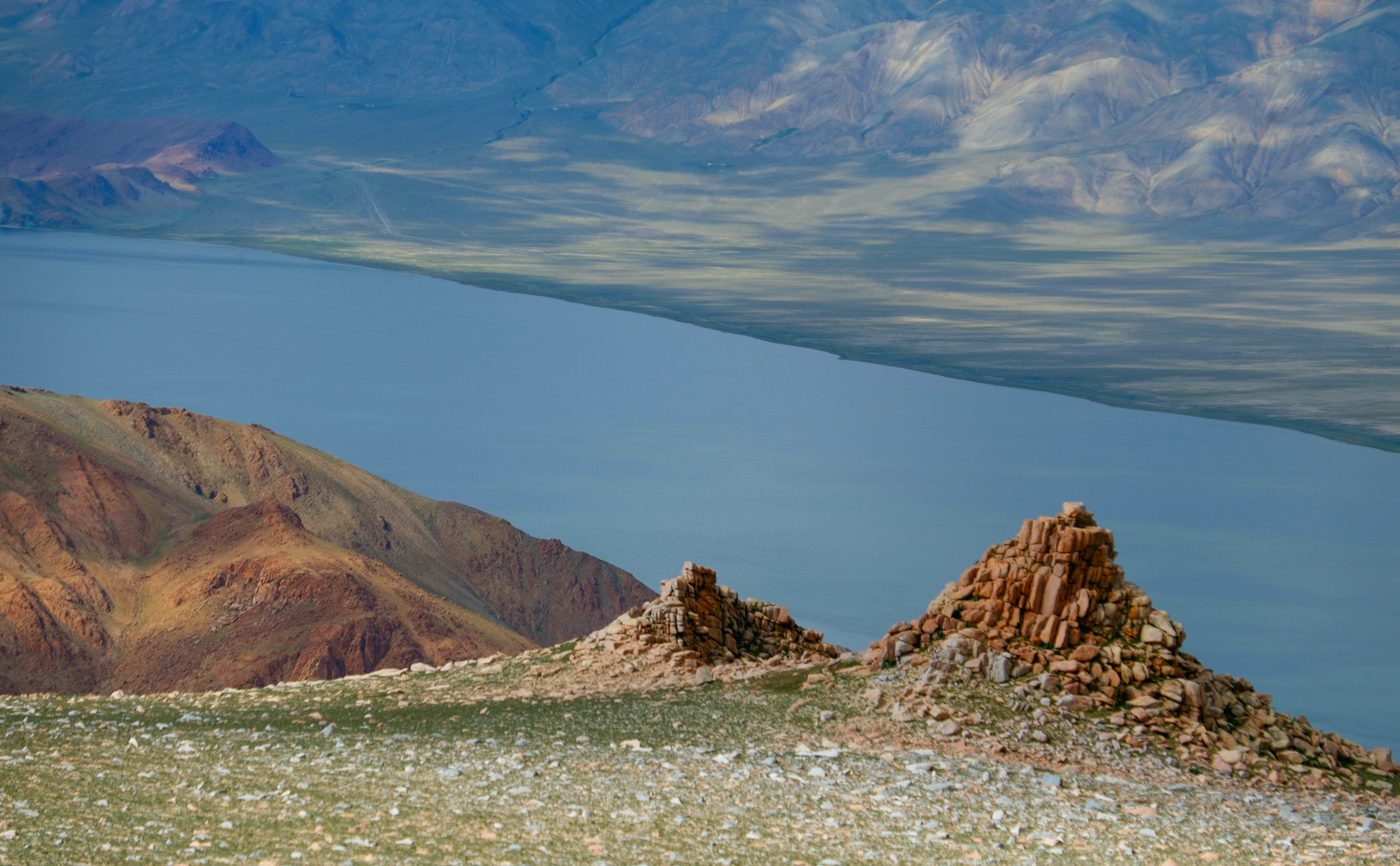

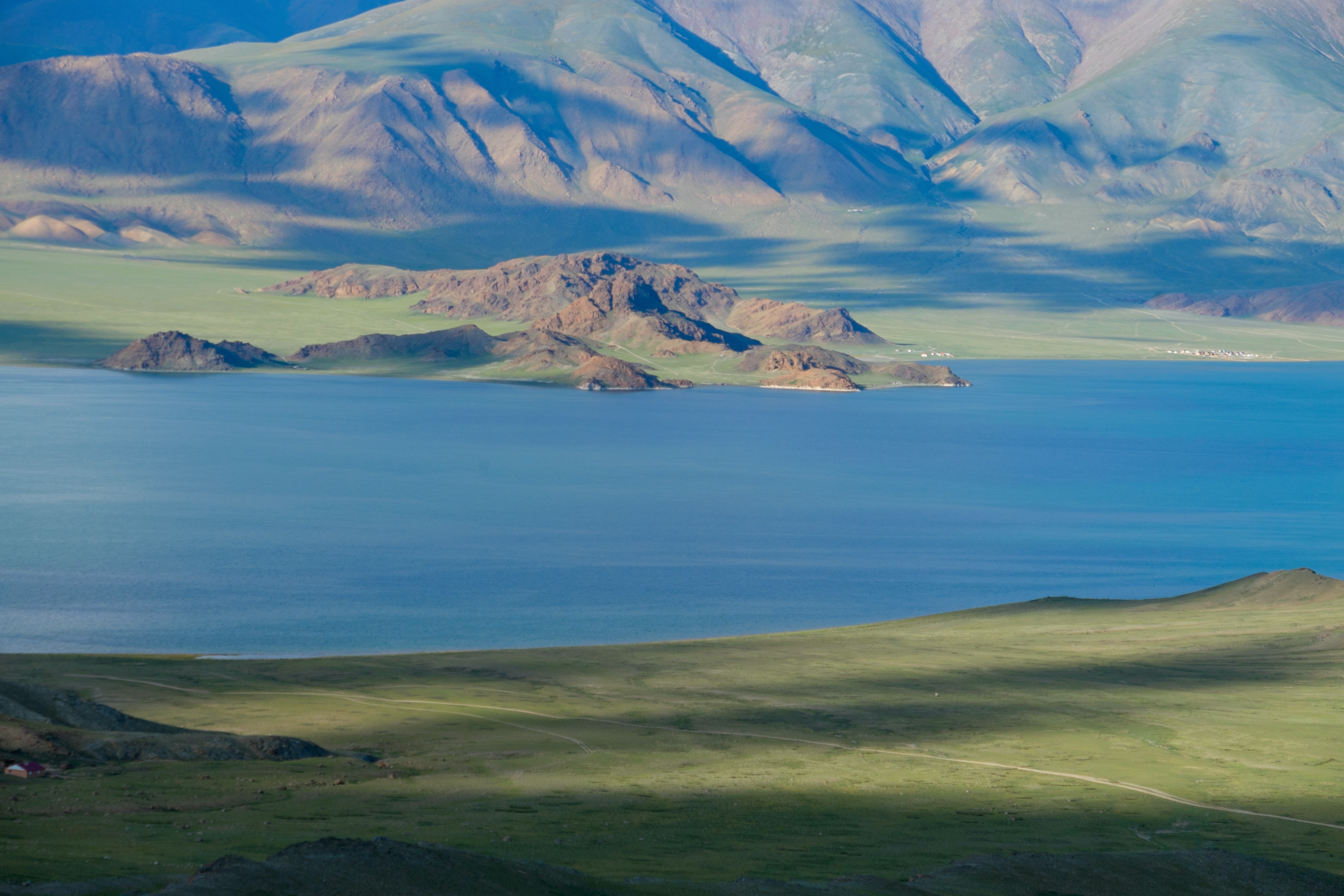

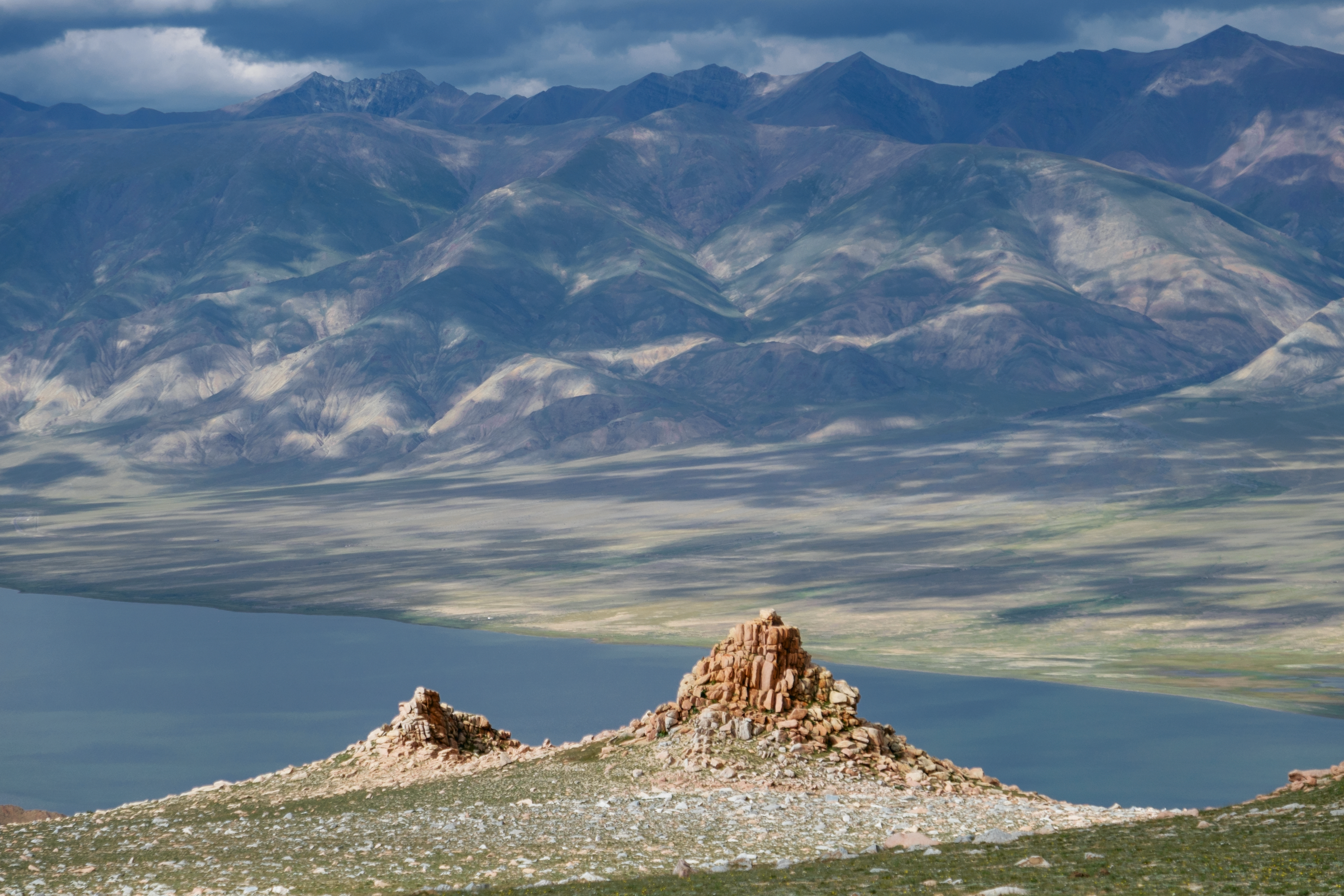

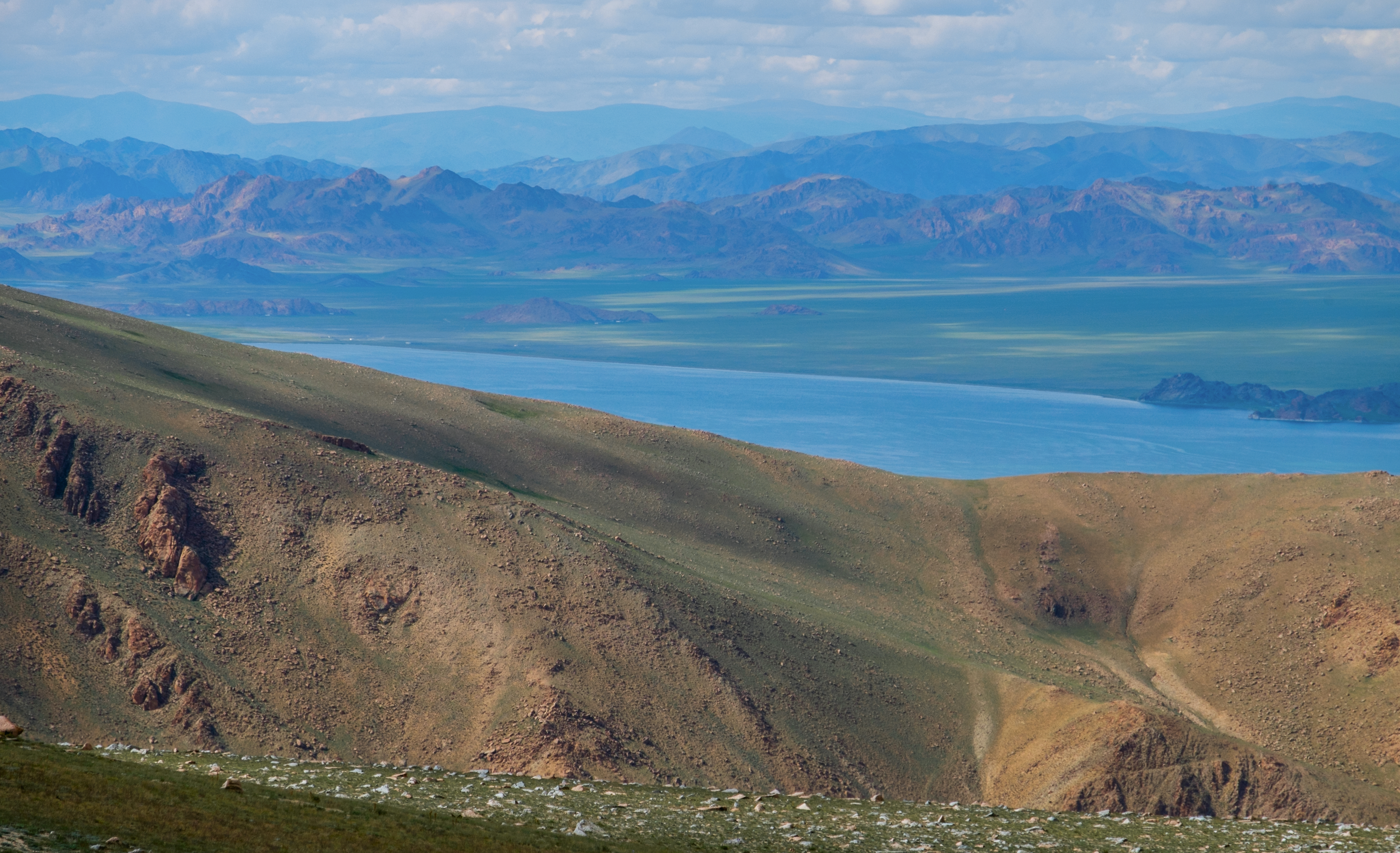

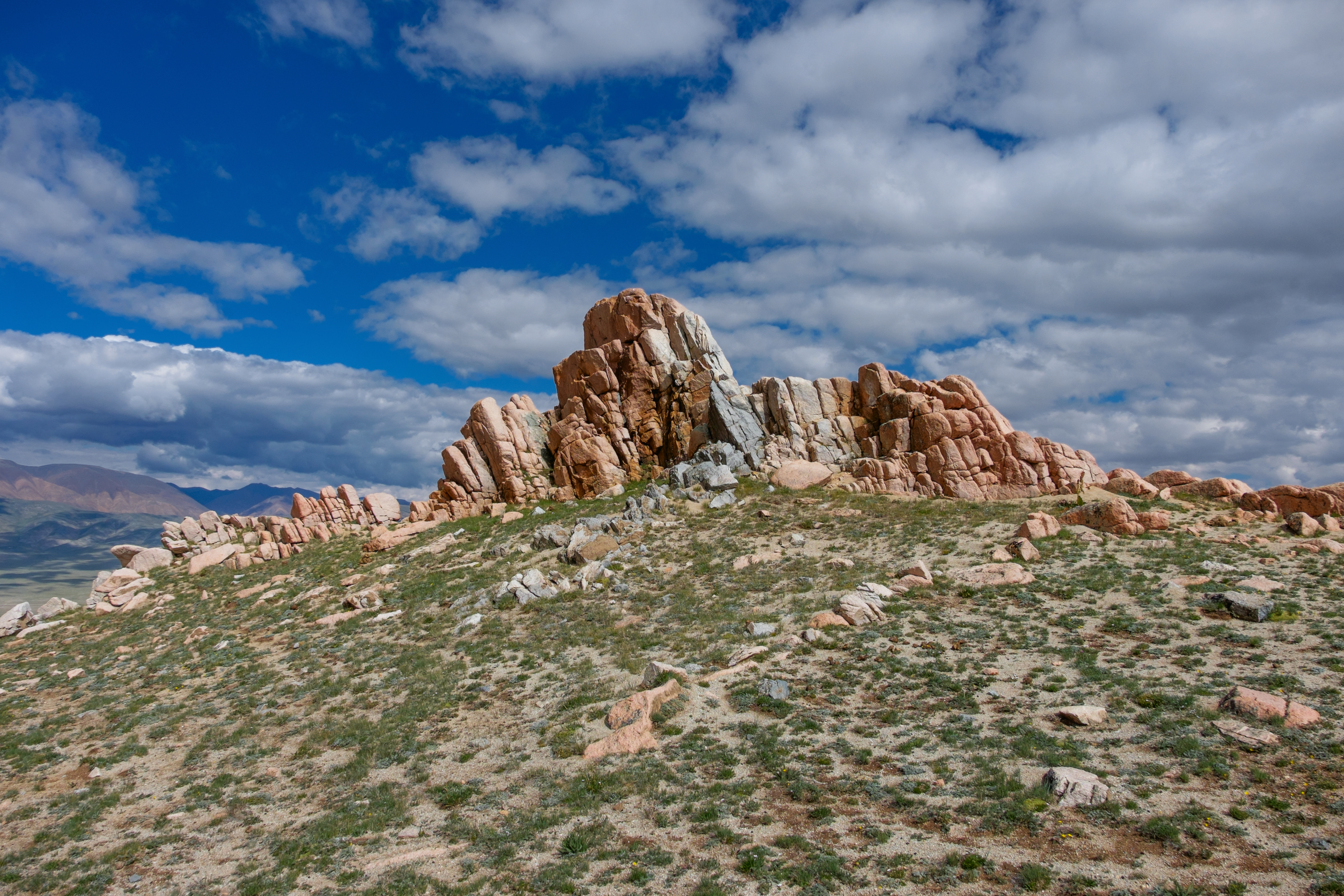

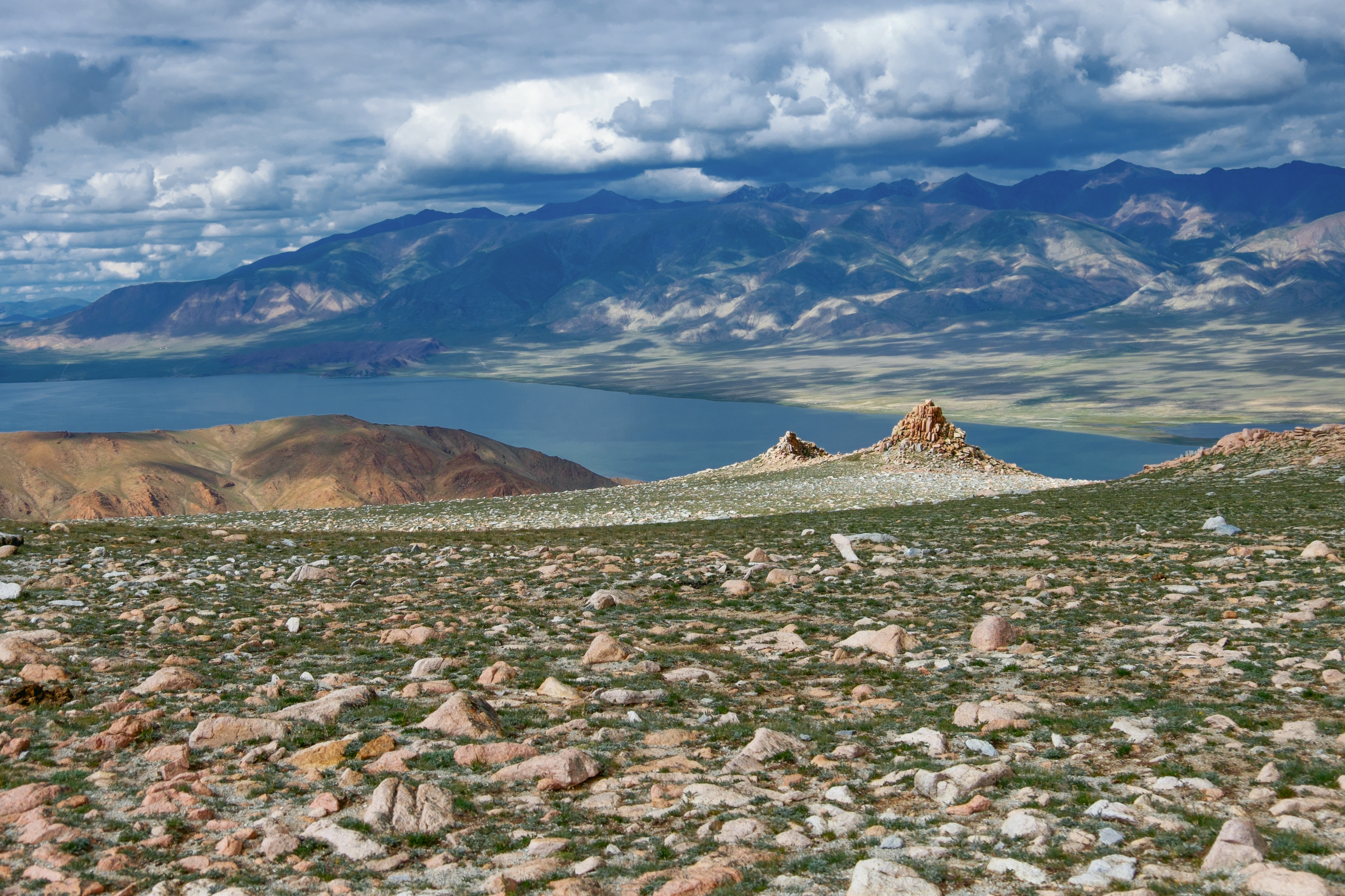

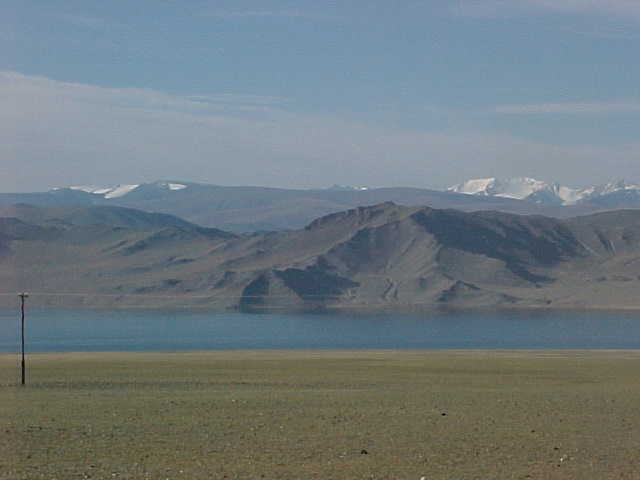

== Economy ==
Fish production from the lake was carried out by Kenjidara LLC in a plant established in 2013.
