= Dayan Lake =

Lake in Sagsai, Bayan-Ölgii, Mongolia

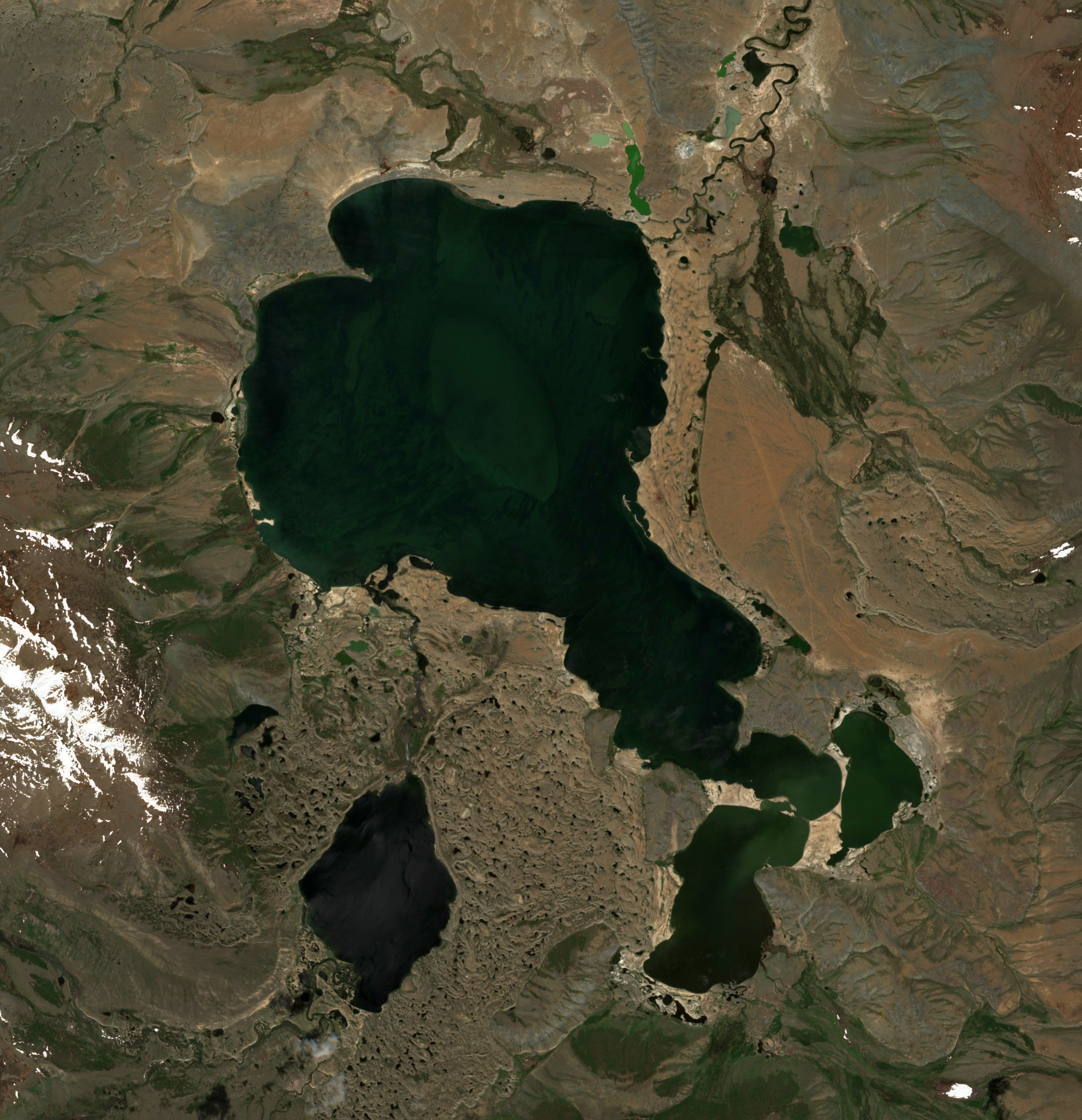

- Location within Mongolia
- Location: Sagsai, Bayan-Ölgii, Mongolia
- Coordinates: 48°21′32″N 88°49′55″E
- Basin countries: Mongolia
- Max. length: 18 km (11 mi)
- Max. width: 9 km (5.6 mi)
- Surface area: 67 km^{2} (26 sq mi)
- Average depth: 2.3 m (7 ft 7 in)
- Max. depth: 4 m (13 ft)
- Water volume: 0.157 km^{3} (127,000 acre⋅ft)
- Surface elevation: 2,232 m (7,323 ft)

Dayan Lake (Mongolian: Даян нуур) is a lake in Sagsai District, Bayan-Ölgii Province, Mongolia. It is recognized by BirdLife International as an Important Bird Area since 2009. It is located in the Altai Tavan Bogd National Park.

Dayan Lake remains frozen from October to June. In the area, there are Mongolian wolves (Canis lupus chanco), red foxes (Vulpes vulpes) and Pallas's cats (Otocolobus manul). From the lake area, there is a view of the Altai Mountains; potentially the place may turn out to be interesting from the point of view of ecotourism.

Due to the six species of birds breeding in the surrounding areas, the lake, along with Khar Lake south-east of Dayan lake and coastal areas, was considered a bird sanctuary. Six species nest around the lakes that BirdLife has identified as key. One, the saker falcon (Falco cherrug), is in danger of extinction, and the white-throated bush chat (Saxicola insignis) is in danger. The other three are considered to be of least concerns; they include: northern lapwing (Vanellus vanellus), lesser kestrel (Falco naumanni) and bar-headed goose (Anser indicus).

== Climate ==
The climate is cold. The average temperature is -5 °C. The warmest month is August, at 14 °C, and the coldest is December, at -24 °C. The average rainfall is 278 millimeters per year. The wettest month is July, with 55 millimeters of rain, and the driest is February, with 6 millimeters.
