= Bayannuur, Bayan-Ölgii =

District in Bayan-Ölgii Province, Mongolia

Bayannuur District Mongolian: Баяннуур сум ᠪᠠᠶ᠋ᠠᠨ ᠨᠠᠭᠤᠷᠰᠤᠮᠤ
- District
- Location in Mongolia
- Coordinates: 48°57′01″N 91°09′43″E
- Country: Mongolia
- Province: Bayan-Ölgii Province

Area
  - Total: 2,339.50 km^{2} (903.29 sq mi)

Population (2014)
  - Total: 4,794
- Time zone: UTC+7 (UTC + 7)

Bayannuur (Mongolian: Баяннуур, Mongolian: rich lake) is a sum (district) of the Bayan-Ölgii Aimag (province) in Mongolia. It is located to the very east of the aimag capital Ölgii and it has a border with the Uvs Aimag. Like in Bayan-Ölgii's other sums, Bayannuur is primarily inhabited by ethnic Kazakhs. As of 2014 it had a population of 4794 people.

== Administrative divisions ==
The district is divided into five bags, which are:

- Bayannuur
- Tsetsegt
- Shar sekhee
- Tsagaan aral
- Tsul ulaan
