= Bugat, Bayan-Ölgii =

District in Bayan-Ölgii Province, Mongolia

Coordinates: 48°57′04″N 90°01′12″E

Bugat District Бугат сум ᠪᠤᠭᠤᠲᠤᠰᠤᠮᠤ
- District
- Interactive map of Bugat District
- Country: Mongolia
- Province: Bayan-Ölgii Province

Area
  - Total: 2,049.10 km^{2} (791.16 sq mi)

Population (2014)
  - Total: 3,487
- Time zone: UTC+7 (UTC + 7)

Bugat (Mongolian: Бугат; "deer") is a sum (district) of Bayan-Ölgii Province in western Mongolia. It is primarily inhabited by ethnic Kazakhs. As of 2014 it had a population of 3487 people.

Since 1999, Bugat has hosted The Gold Eagle Festival. The Golden Eagle Festival is the largest gathering of eagle hunters and their eagles and is recognized as a UNESCO World Heritage Cultural Event.

== Administrative divisions ==
The district is divided into five bags, which are:

- Buga
- Ikh bulan
- Khatuu
- Tsagaan aral
- Ulaantolgoi
