= Tsengel, Bayan-Ölgii =

District in Bayan-Ölgii Province, Mongolia

Coordinates: 48°56′27″N 89°08′18″E

Tsengel District Цэнгэл сум ᠴᠡᠩᠭᠡᠯᠰᠤᠮᠤ
- District
- Interactive map of Tsengel District
- Country: Mongolia
- Province: Bayan-Ölgii Province

Area
  - Total: 6,463.17 km^{2} (2,495.44 sq mi)

Population (2014)
  - Total: 8,744
- Time zone: UTC+7 (UTC + 7)

Tsengel (Mongolian: Цэнгэл [t͡sʰé̝ŋkɪɮ]; "delight"), also referred to as Ak-Sayan (Tuvan: Ак-Саян; 'white-Sayan'), is a district of Bayan-Ölgii Province in western Mongolia. It is named after Mount Tsengelkhairkhan which is located in this sum. Its capital, Khushoot, is located in the west of the district.

Its inhabitants are mainly ethnic Tuvans (also known as Tsengel Tuvans), whereas the rest of Bayan-Ölgii Province is populated mainly by Kazakhs. As of 2014, it had a population of 8,744.

== Geography ==
The sum is located in the western most part of Bayan-Ölgii Province. It is also the western most sum of all sums in Mongolia.

== Geology ==
- Baga Türgen Waterfall
- Khoton Lake

== Administrative divisions ==
The district is divided into nine bags, which are:

- Borburgas
- Doloon Gadlaga
- Khar Uul
- Khushuut
- Partizan
- Shar Govi
- Tsagaan Tunge
- Ust Tokhoi
- Zagast Nuur

== Economy ==
The district has a total of 307,000 livestock population. It has a capacity to harvest 7,700 tons of hay per year. The primary industry in the district are Shar nuur gold mining, brick factories and tourism.
