= Bayan-Ölgii Province =

Westernmost Mongolian province

Bayan-Ölgii Province Баян-Өлгий аймаг ᠪᠠᠶ᠋ᠠᠨ ᠥᠯᠦᠭᠡᠢ ᠠᠢᠮᠠᠭ
- Province
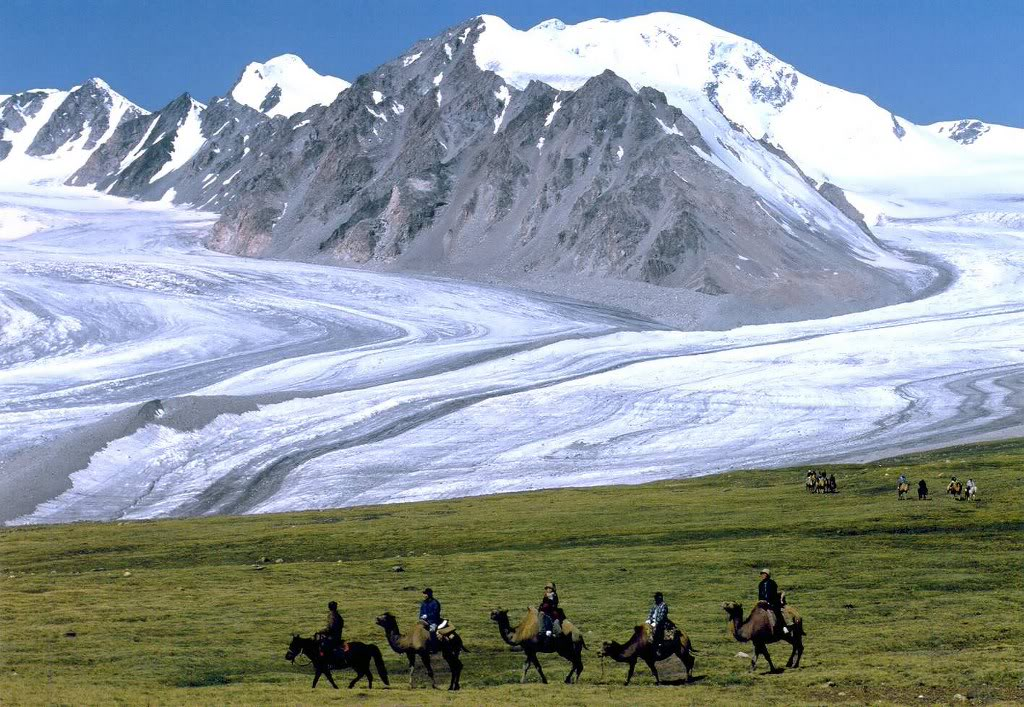
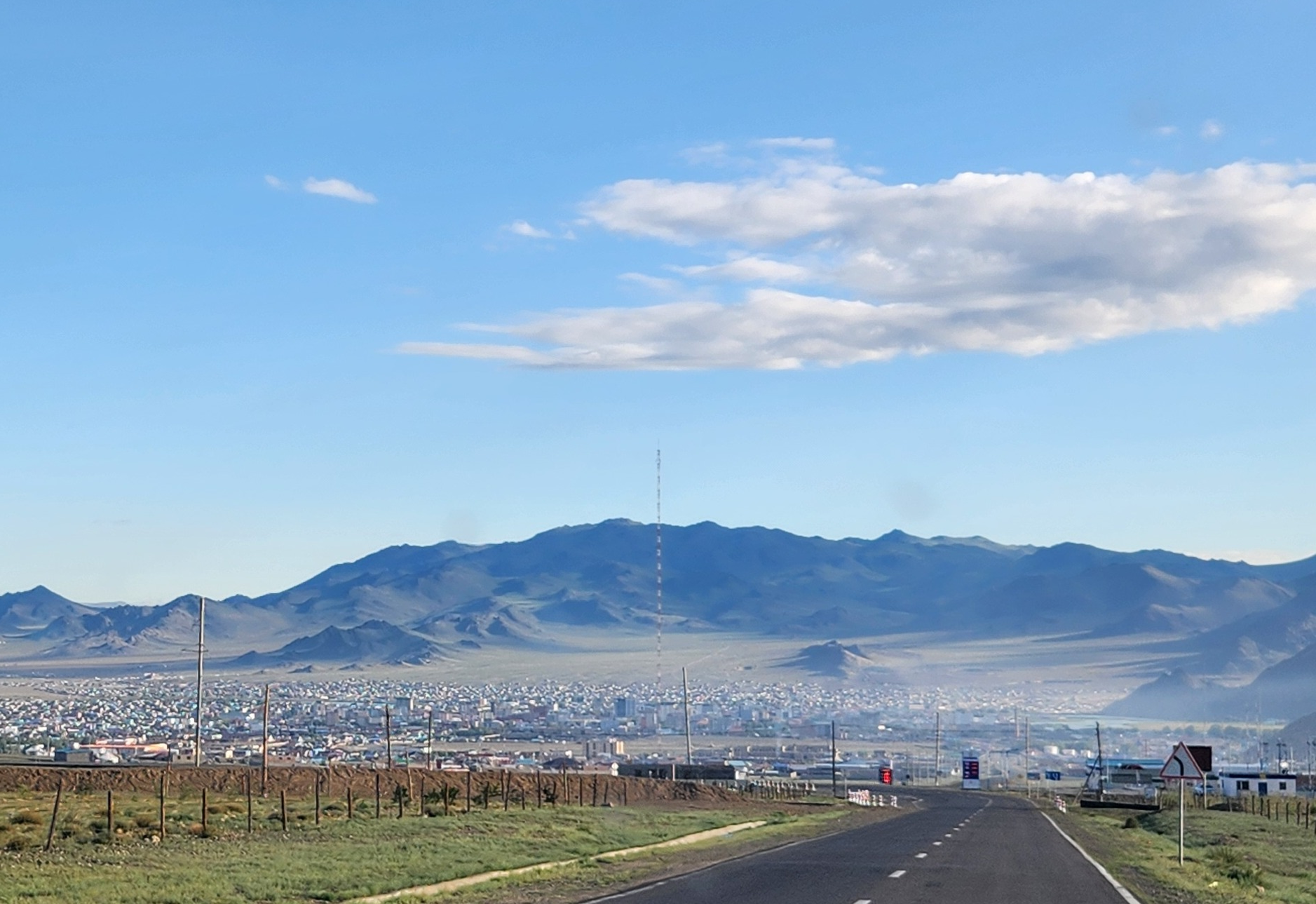
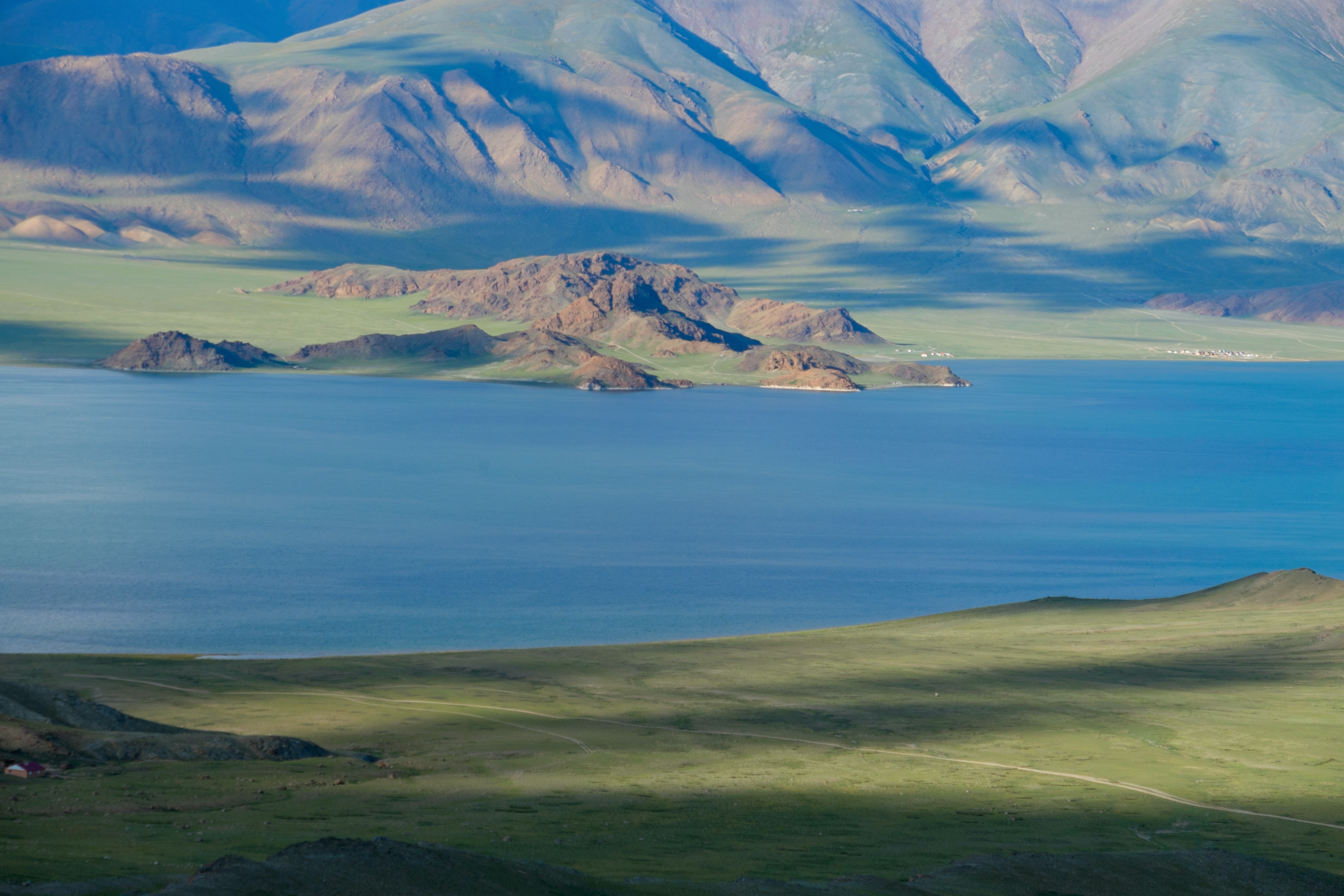
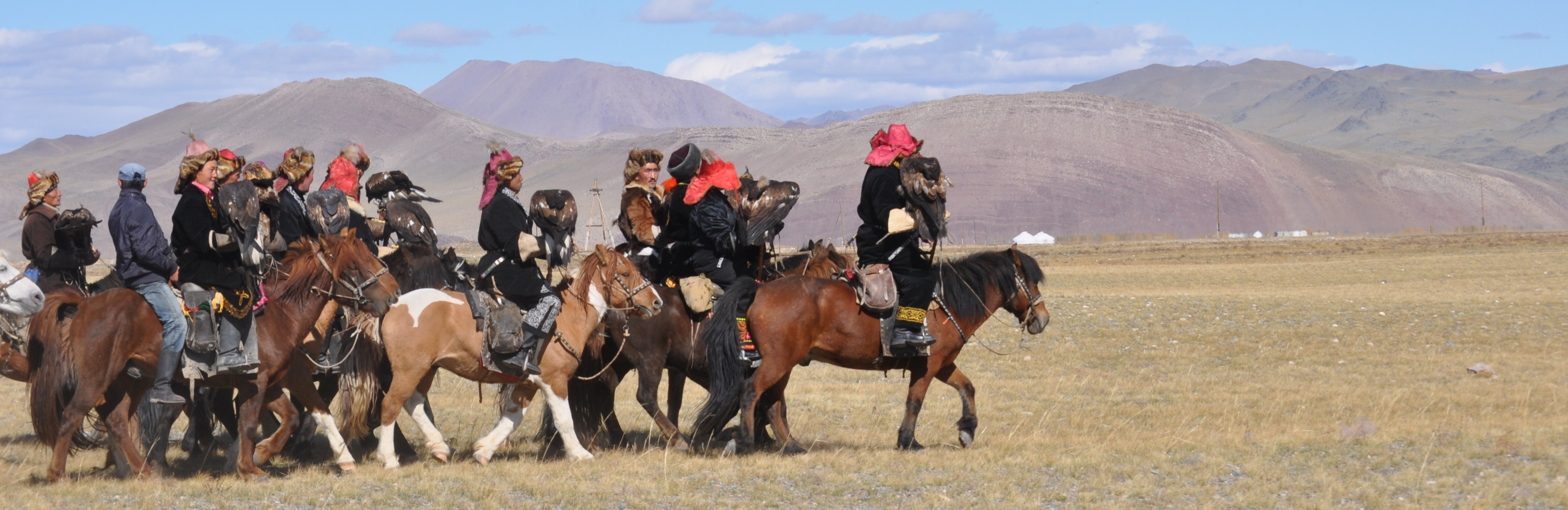
- Altai Tavan Bogd National Park Ölgii from afar Tolbo Lake Kazakh eagle hunters

- Flag Coat of arms

- Location of Bayan-Ölgii in Mongolia
- Coordinates: 48°18′N 89°30′E
- Country: Mongolia
- Established: 1940
- Capital: Ölgii
- Districts: 13 districts: Altai; Altantsögts; Bayannuur; Bugat; Bulgan; Buyant; Delüün; Nogoonnuur; Ölgii (capital); Sagsai; Tolbo; Tsengel; Ulaankhus

Government
  - Body: Citizens' Representatives Khural of Bayan-Ölgii Province
  - Governor: Zangar Yesyentai (DP)

Area
  - Province: 45,704.89 km^{2} (17,646.76 sq mi)
- Highest elevation (Khüiten Peak): 4,374 m (14,350 ft)
  - Rank: 1st in Mongolia
- Lowest elevation (Bayannuur): 1,301 m (4,268 ft)

Population (2025)
  - Province: 109,038
  - Estimate (2024): 110,799
  - Density: 2.38570/km^{2} (6.17893/sq mi)
  - Urban: ~38,900
  - Rural: ~65,000

GDP
  - Total: ▲MNT 927.8 billion US$ 258.9 million (2025)
  - Per capita: ▲MNT 8.4247 million US$ 2,343 (2025)
- Time zone: UTC+7 (Hovd Time)
- Postal code: 83000–83999
- Area code: +976 (0)142
- ISO 3166 code: MN-071
- Vehicle registration: БӨ_
- HDI (2024): 0.694 medium
- Website: www.bayan-olgii.gov.mn

Bayan-Ölgii (/ˈbaɪən ˈoʊlɡi/ BY-ən OHL-gee) (Note: Mongolian: Баян-Өлгий, IPA: [ˈpajɴ ɵɮˈɟiː]; Oirat: Байн-Өлгий, IPA: [ˈpajɴ ɵlʲˈɡʲiː]; Kazakh: Бай-Өлке, romanized: Bai-Ölke, arabized: باي- ٴولكە, IPA: [ˌb̥aj‿ɵʎˈcʰe]; lit. 'Wealthy Region') is the westernmost of the 21 aimags (provinces) of Mongolia. The country's only Muslim and Kazakh-majority aimag, it was established in August 1940, having its capital at Ölgii.

== Geography ==
The aimag is located in the extreme west of the country and shares borders with both Russia and China. The border between the two neighbouring countries is very short here, though, and ends after about 40 km at the eastern end of Kazakhstan. Within Mongolia, the neighbouring aimags are Uvs in the north east and Khovd in the south east.

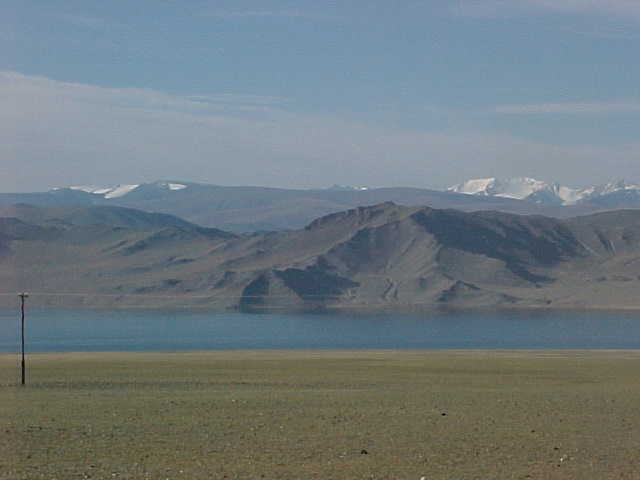
Tolbo Lake

Bayan-Ölgii is the highest Mongolian aimag. For the most part it is located in the Mongolian Altai Mountains, at the transition point to the Russian Altai. About 10% of the territory is covered by forests, consisting primarily of Siberian Larch.

The Nairamdal Peak (also Friendship Peak, Chinese: Youyi Feng) of the Altai Tavan Bogd (five saints mountain) massif mountain marks the corner between the three neighbouring countries. About 2.5 km further south on the Mongolian-Chinese border, the Khüiten Peak is the highest point of Mongolia at a height of 4,374 m. The massif includes several glaciers, such as the 19 km Potanin Glacier, and is only accessible to experienced climbers with local guidance.

The Khovd River (the longest in the western Mongolian Great Lakes Depression) has its origin in this aimag. It is fed by the three lakes Khoton, Khurgan, and Dayan, and in turn feeds the lake Khar-Us in the Khovd Aimag. The Tolbo Lake is a large saline lake about 50 km south of the aimag capital. It features clear and cold water on an elevation of 2,080 m.

=== National parks ===
The Altai Tavan Bogd National Park covers 6,362 km² and is located south of the highest mountain of Mongolia. It includes the lakes Khoton, Khurgan, and Dayan. The protected area offers a home for many species of alpine animal, such as the Argali sheep, Ibex, Red deer, Beech marten, Moose, Snow cock, and Golden eagle.

The Khökh Serkhiin Nuruu Protected Area (659 km²) and the Siilkhemiin Nuruu National Park (1,428 km²) are of similar character.

The Develiin Aral Natural Reserve (103 km²) is established around Develiin Island at the confluence of the rivers Lsan Khooloi and Khovd. Since 2000 it has provided protection for various birds and animals including pheasants, boars, and beavers.

The Tsambagarav Uul National Park includes 1,115 km² of land around the glaciers near the Khovd aimag and protects the snow leopards living there, among others.

== Demographics ==
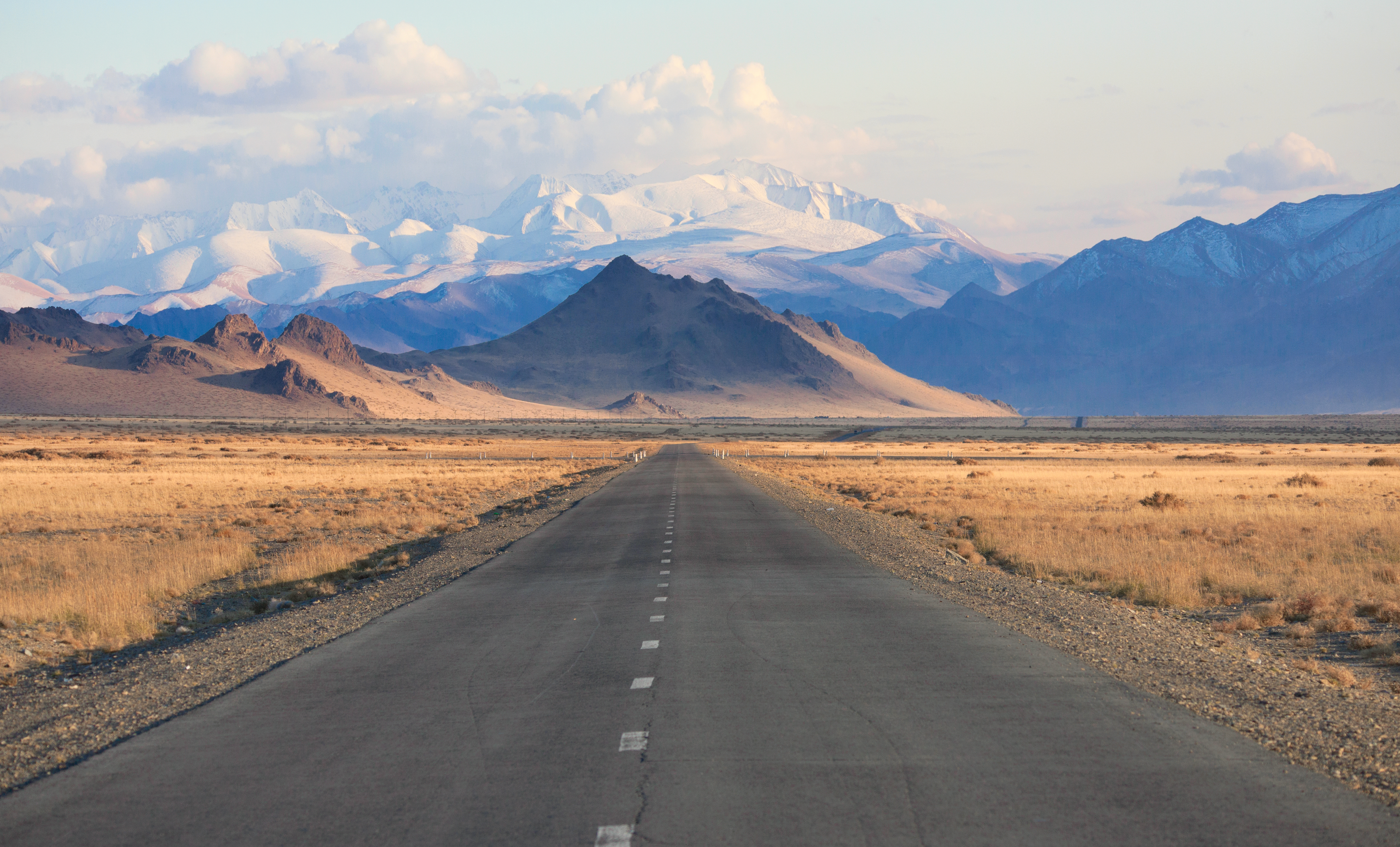
A0306 National Highway

Most inhabitants of Bayan-Ölgii are Kazakhs (93%). The rest of the population is composed of Uriankhai, Dörvöd, Khalkha, Tsengel Tuvans, and Khoshuud. A significant portion of the population speaks Kazakh as their mother tongue and the Mongolian language only as a second language, if at all.

After democratization, many inhabitants moved to their historical homeland, Kazakhstan, assuming they would find a better future there. The result was a noticeable loss of population in 1991–1993, when approximately 80 thousand repatriated to Kazakhstan. A noticeable number of former immigrants have been returning, so that the population has risen again.

Bayan-Ölgii aimag population
1956 census	1960 est.	1963 census	1969 census	1975 est.	1979 census	1981 est.	1985 est.	1989 census	1991 est.	1993 est.	1995 est.	1998 est.	2000 census	2010 census	2020 census	2024 est.
38,800	44,600	47,800	58,100	66,600	71,400	74,500	82,400	90,900	102,817	75,043	82,259	87,341	94,094	88,056	108,530	110,799

== Culture ==
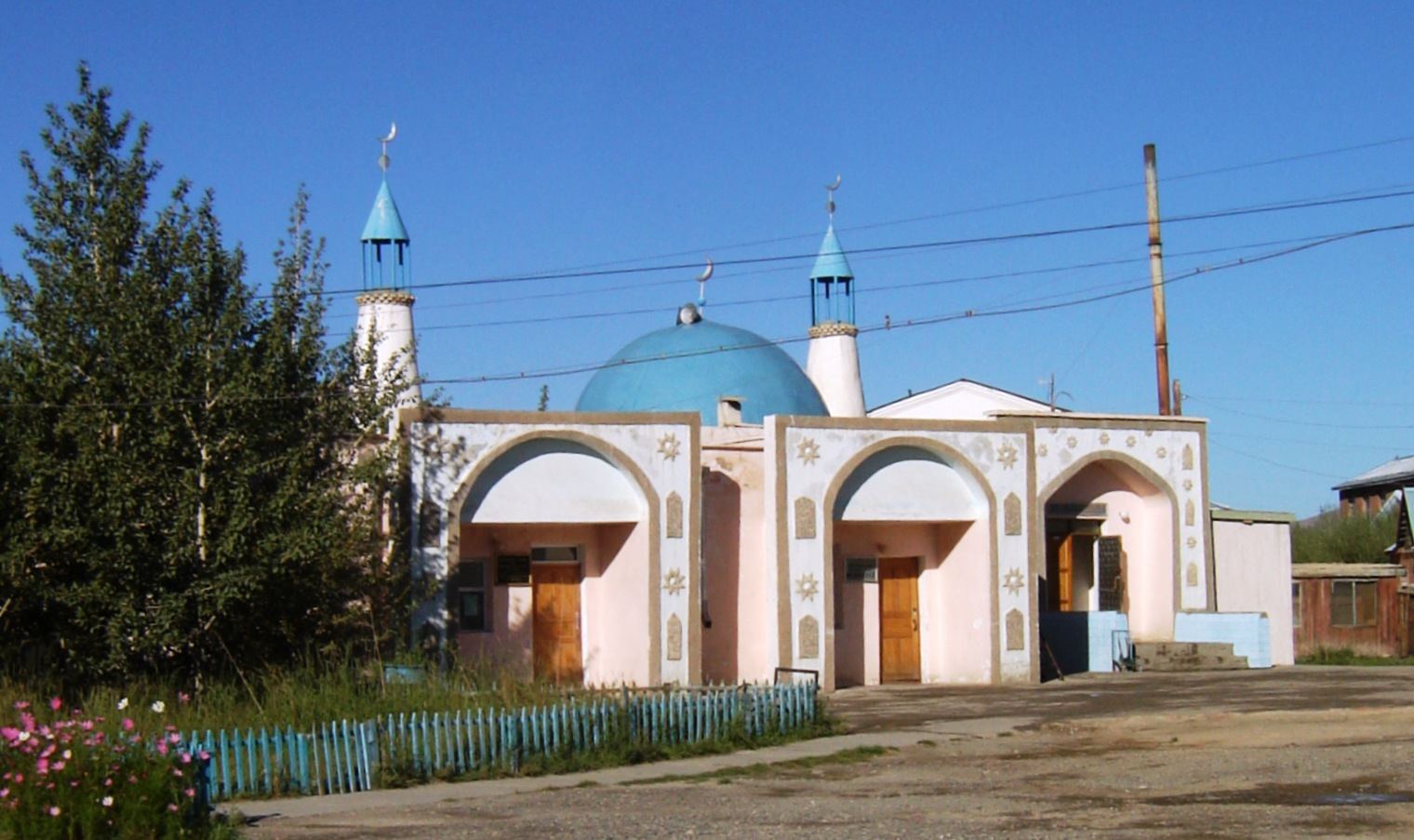
Abu-Bakr Siddiq Central Mosque

The culture of the Kazakh majority is strongly influenced by Islamic traditions. The Abu-Bakr Siddiq Central Mosque also houses the Islamic Center of Mongolia. It is placed at an unusual angle within the fabric of the city, because the building was oriented exactly towards Mecca. There is also a madrasah (Islamic school) at the same place.

The aimag is famous for the traditional practice of hunting with trained eagles. The captive eagles work in a similar way as hunting falcons do. While eagles are used for hunting in other parts of the world, particularly Kazakhstan and Kyrgyzstan, the practice is most common in Bayan-Ölgii, where an estimated 80 percent of the world's eagle hunters live. The annual Golden Eagle Festival is held in Ölgii every October to display the skill of eagle hunters, with about 70 hunters participating per year.

== Administrative subdivisions ==
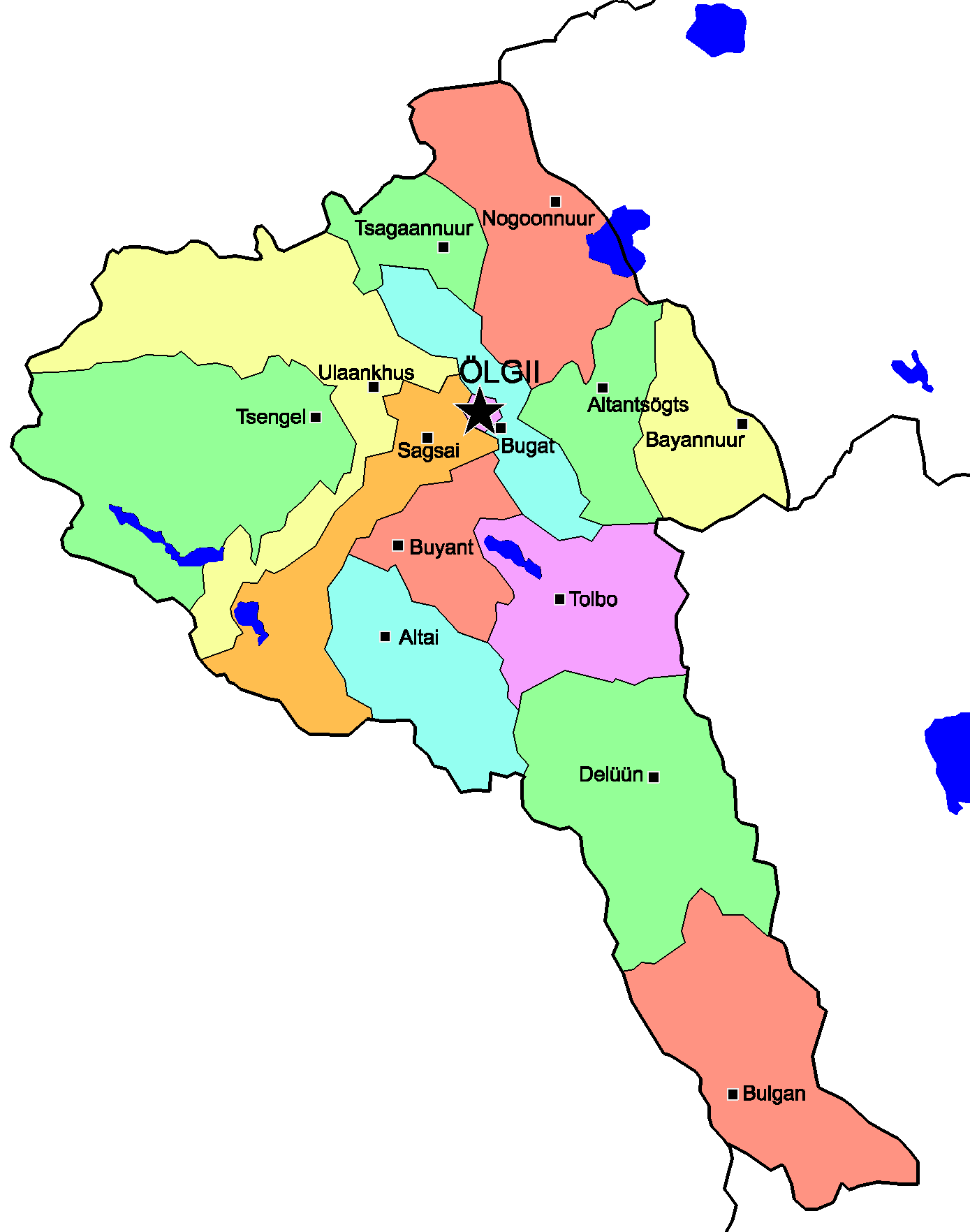
Sums of Bayan-Ölgii

Administratively, Bayan-Ölgii is divided into 13 sums (districts), 1 tosgon (village), and 99 bags (subdistricts).

The farthest district center (Mongolian: Сумын төв) from Ölgii is Jargalant, center of Bulgan, at 300 km, while the closest is Buga, center of Bugat, at 5 km.

With an area of 6.5 thousand km², Tsengel is the largest sum in the province, while Altantsögts, covering 1.8 thousand km², is the smallest.

Districts of Bayan-Ölgii Province
Sum (District)	Mongolian	District population (1985)	District population (1994)	District population (2005)	District population (2008)	District population (2009)	District population (2024)	Area (km²)	Density (/km²)	Distance from Ölgii city(km)
Altai	Алтай	3,400	3,237	3,914	3,659	3,811	4,300	3,163.56	1.4	110
Altantsögts	Алтанцөгц	3,300	3,038	3,038	3,114	3,080	2,951	1,786.10	1.7	45
Bayannuur	Баяннуур	4,800	4,507	5,320	5,012	5,033	5,052	2,339.50	2.2	126
Bugat	Бугат	3,300	2,777	3,604	3,741	3,642	4,249	2,049.10	2.0	5
Bulgan	Булган	5,000	5,115	5,901	5,827	5,528	4,508	4,977.33	0.9	300
Buyant	Буянт	2,300	2,546	3,002	2,683	2,514	2,805	1,845.67	1.5	75
Delüün	Дэлүүн	6,600	6,782	8,183	7,078	7,133	7,485	5,594.99	1.3	150
Nogoonnuur	Ногооннуур	7,500 *	6,331	6,539	6,566	6,375	6,723	3,818.60	1.6	110
Ölgii	Өлгий	24,000	21,569	28,248	28,496	28,448	42,061	100.92	416.8	0
Sagsai	Сагсай	4,100	3,746	5,185	5,174	5,089	5,594	3,139.99	1.8	27
Tolbo	Толбо	4,100	3,746	4,260	4,076	4,136	4,474	2,974.69	1.5	76
Tsagaannuur ^{*}	Цагааннуур	-	1,878	1,528	1,452	1,473	1,688	1,403.34	n/a	n/a
Tsengel	Цэнгэл	6,700	6,539	8,364	8,305	8,348	9,915	6,463.17	1.5	75
Ulaankhus	Улаанхус	7,300	6,807	8,672	8,748	8,407	8,994	6,047.93	1.5	45

^{*} - A tosgon (village) a part of Nogoonnuur district, a lower administrative unit than district but higher than subdistrict

== Economy ==
The main economy activity of the province is animal husbandry. In 2022, there were 2.3 million head of livestock in the province. In 2010, the GDP of the province is divided into agriculture (45%), services (40.2%) and industry (14.8%). In 2018, the province contributed to 1.15% of the total national GDP of Mongolia.

== Governors ==
First secretaries (1940–1992)

1. Shymshyryn Nogai (Kazakh: Шымшырұлы Ноғай Mongolian: Шымшырын Ногай; 1940–1942)
2. Düzelbain Jeniskhan (Kazakh: Дүзелбайұлы Жеңісхан Mongolian: Дүзелбайн Женисхан; 1942)
3. Sharavyn Vanchinkhüü (Mongolian: Ш. Ванчинхүү Mongolian: Шаравын Ванчинхүү; 1943)
4. Malikiin Khashkhynbai (Kazakh: Мәлікұлы Қашқынбай Mongolian: Маликийн Хашхынбай; 1943–1952)
5. Mukhammadiin Khurmankhan (Kazakh: Мұхамәдиұлы Құрманхан Mongolian: Мухаммадийн Хурманхан; 1952–1953)
6. Juangany Yrym (Kazakh: Жуанғанұлы Ырым Mongolian: Жуанганы Ырым; 1953–1954)
7. Malikiin Khashkhynbai (Kazakh: Мәлікұлы Қашқынбай Mongolian: Маликийн Хашхынбай; 1954–1957)
8. Khamatjany Musakhan (Kazakh: Қаматжанұлы Мұсахан Mongolian: Хаматжаны Мусахан; 1958–1962)
9. O. Dulamragchaa (Mongolian: О. Дуламрагчаа; 1962–1966)
10. Bugyn Dejid (Mongolian: Бугын Дэжид; 1966–1970)
11. Ya. Jigjid (Mongolian: Я.Жигжид; 1970–1976)
12. L. Khürlee (Mongolian: Л. Хүрлээ; 1976–1980)
13. Baitazagiin Khurmyetbyek (Kazakh: Байтазаұлы Құрметбек Mongolian: Байтазагийн Хурметбек; 1980–1990)

Chairmen of executive committee (1940–1992)

1. Bajiin Khabi (Kazakh: Бәжіұлы Қаби Mongolian: Бажийн Хаби; 1940–1942)
2. A. Begzjav (Mongolian: А.Бэгзжав; 1942–1943)
3. Duzelbain Jyeniskhan (Kazakh: Дүзелбайұлы Жеңісхан Mongolian: Дүзелбайн Женисхан; 1943–1950)
4. Mukhammadiin Khurmankhan (Kazakh: Мұхамәдиұлы Құрманхан Mongolian: Мухаммадийн Хурманхан; 1950–1952)
5. Ch. Shagdar (Mongolian: Ч.Шагдар; 1952–1953)
6. Mukhammadiin Khurmankhan (Kazakh: Мұхамәдиұлы Құрманхан Mongolian: Мухаммадийн Хурманхан; 1954–1955)
7. Shabiin Khabdyl (Kazakh: Шәбіұлы Қабдыл Mongolian: Шабийн Хабдыл; 1955–1958)
8. Juangany Yrym (Kazakh: Жуанғанұлы Рым Mongolian: Жуанганы Ырым; 1959–1970)
9. Askhanbain Sarai (Kazakh: Асқанбайұлы Сарай Mongolian: Асханбайн Сарай; 1970–1978)
10. Khusbyekiin Khyzyrkhan (Kazakh: Құсбекұлы Қызырхан Mongolian: Хусбекийн Хызырхан; 1978–1989)
11. T. Davaajav (Mongolian: Т.Даваажав; 1989–1990)
12. Küntugany Mizamkhan (Kazakh: Күнтуганы Мизамхан Mongolian: Күнтуганы Мизамхан; 1990–1992)

Governors (after 1992)

1. Küntugany Mizamkhan (Kazakh: Күнтуғанұлы Мизамхан Mongolian: Күнтуганы Мизамхан; 1992–1996)
2. Khadyryn Myeiram (Kazakh: Қадырұлы Мейрам Mongolian: Хадырын Мейрам; 1996–2000)
3. Khavdislamyn Badyelkhan (Kazakh: Қабдысіләмұлы Бәделхан Mongolian: Хавдисламын Баделхан; 2000–2004)
4. Omaryn Khavsatar (Kazakh: Омарұлы Ғабсаттар Mongolian: Омарын Хавсатар; 2005–2007)
5. Sakyein Khaval (Kazakh: Сәкейұлы Қабыл Mongolian: Сакейн Хавал; 2007–2012)
6. Khuzkyein Darmyen (Kazakh: Құзкейұлы Дәрмен Mongolian: Хузкейн Дармен; 2012–2016)
7. Aipyn Gylymkhan (Kazakh: Айыпұлы Ғылымхан Mongolian: Айпын Гылымхан; 2016–2020)
8. Dalyeliin Bauyrjan (Kazakh: Далелұлы Бауыржан Mongolian: Далелийн Бауыржан; 2020-2022)
9. Akhmediyagiin Kameliyat (Kazakh: Ахмедияұлы Камелият Mongolian: Ахмедиягийн Камелият; 2022–2024)
10. Yesyentain Zangar (Kazakh: Заңғар Есентайұлы Mongolian: Есентайн Зангар; 2024–present)

== Transportation ==
The Ölgii Airport (ULG/ZMUL) has one runway, unpaved until 2011. It offers regular flights to Ulaanbaatar and irregular flights to Ulaangom and Mörön in Mongolia and Almaty in Kazakhstan.

A road connecting to Russia starts in Tsagaannuur.

The border with China is open only for a short time in the summer.
