= Sagsai =

District in Bayan-Ölgii Province, Mongolia

Coordinates: 48°54′42″N 89°38′59″E

Sagsai District Сагсай сум ᠰᠠᠭᠰᠠᠢᠰᠤᠮᠤ
- District
- Interactive map of Sagsai District
- Country: Mongolia
- Province: Bayan-Ölgii Province

Area
  - Total: 3,139.99 km^{2} (1,212.36 sq mi)

Population (2014)
  - Total: 4,945
- Time zone: UTC+7 (UTC + 7)

Sagsai (Mongolian: Сагсай [sɐʁsɛ́ː] "thin") is a district of Bayan-Ölgii Province in western Mongolia. It is primarily inhabited by ethnic Kazakhs. As of 2014, it had a population of 4,945.

The district is home to a large number of eagle hunters who use golden eagles to hunt foxes and hares. Each year, Sagsai hosts the Altai Kazakh Eagle Festival and Sagsai Golden Eagle Festival on the last weekend of September to celebrate its heritage.

== Administrative divisions ==
The district is divided into seven bags, which are:

- Dayan
- Dund Uul
- Khag
- Tsagaan Asgat
- Umnu Gol
- Uujim
- Yamaat
