= Uvs Lake Basin =

Endorheic basin in Tuva, Russia and Mongolia

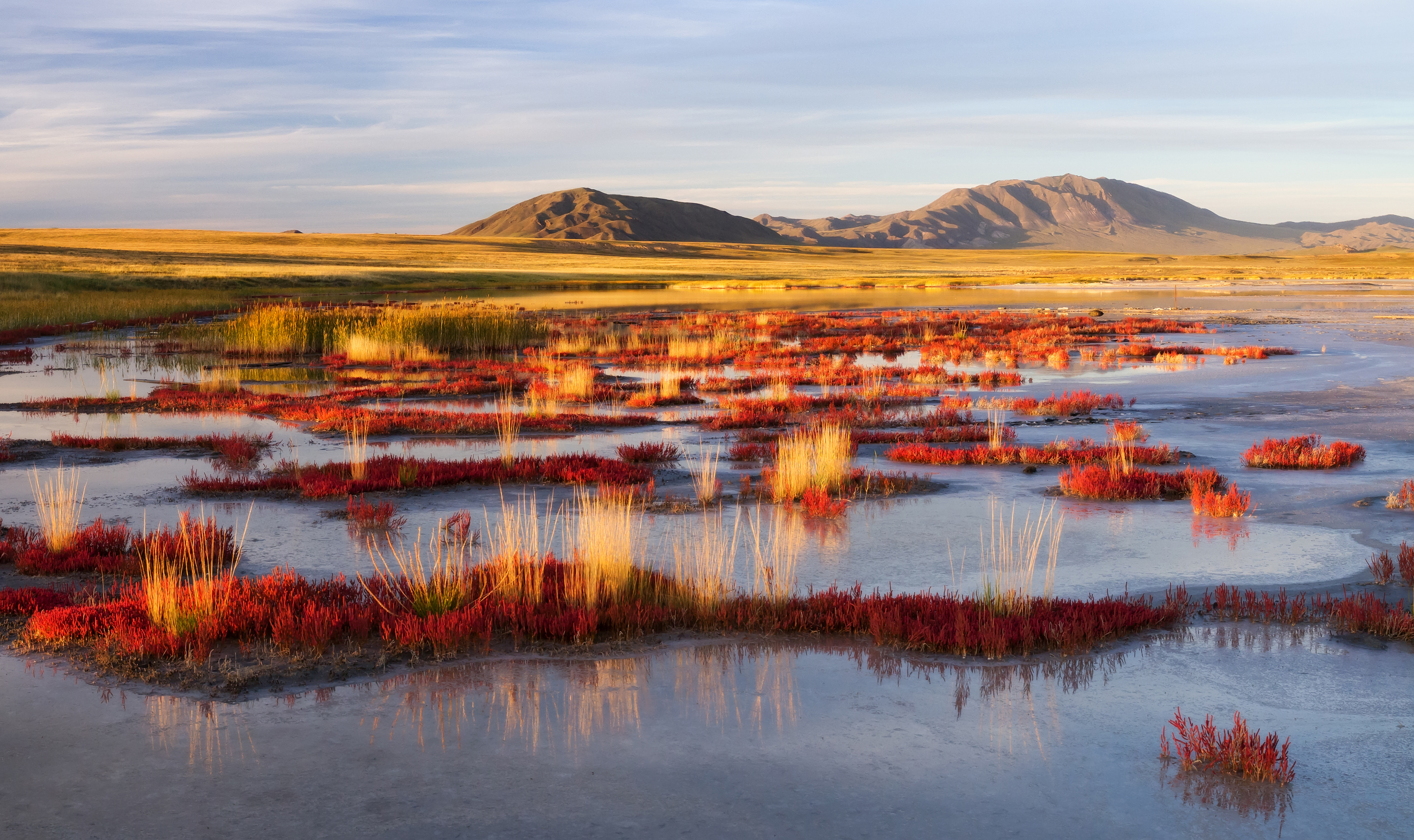

- Location within Mongolia Location within Russia
- Coordinates: 50°10′N 93°50′E
- Countries: Russia and Mongolia
- States: Tuva (Russia)
- Provinces: Uvs, Zavkhan and Khövsgöl in Mongolia
- Districts: Mongun-Tayginsky, Ovyursky, Tes-Khemsky and Erzinsky in Tuva

Area
  - Total: 70,000 km^{2} (27,000 sq mi)
  - Protected: 10,688 km^{2} (4,127 sq mi)
- Ubsunorskaya Kotlovina (Russia)
- Area: 2,843 km^{2} (1,098 sq mi)
- Designation: Biosphere Reserve
- Designated: 1997
- Uvs Nuur Basin (Mongolia)
- Area: 7,717 km^{2} (2,980 sq mi)
- Designation: Biosphere Reserve
- Designated: 1997

UNESCO World Heritage Site
- Location: Russia and Mongolia
- Criteria: Natural: (ix)(x)
- Reference: 769rev
- Inscription: 2003 (27th Session)
- Area: 8,980.635 km^{2} (3,467.443 sq mi)
- Buffer zone: 1,707.90 km^{2} (659.42 sq mi)

Ramsar Wetland
- Official name: Lake Uvs and its surrounding wetlands
- Designated: 2004
- Country: Mongolia
- Area: 5,850 km^{2} (2,260 sq mi)

Uvs Lake Basin (also Uvs Nuur Basin or Ubs Nuur Basin; Mongolian: Увс нуурын хотгор, romanized: Uws nuuriin hotgor) is an endorheic basin located on the territorial border of Mongolia and Russia. The basin is part of the Central Asian Internal Drainage Basin and is named after Uvs Lake (Uvs Nuur, Ubsu Nur), a large saline lake situated in the western part of its drainage basin, and is one of the last remnants of the mammoth steppes. Uvs Lake is a shallow lake with an area of 3,350 km^{2} (1,290 sq mi). The basin, which includes several smaller lakes, is 70,000 km^{2} (27,000 sq mi).

== Description ==
Uvs Lake Basin may also refer to Ubsunur Hollow (Russian: Убсунурская котловина, Ubsunorskaya Kotlovina), which is the western part of the drainage basin, or to over 10,000 km^{2} (3,900 sq mi) of protected areas covering the lake and its surroundings. The hollow forms the northern part of the Great Lakes Depression, which has a surface of over 100,000 km^{2} (39,000 mi^{2}). The hollow and most of the drainage basin are situated in the Khövsgöl, Zavkhan and Uvs Provinces of north-western Mongolia, and the Mongun-Tayginsky, Ovyursky, Tes-Khemsky and Erzinsky Districts of southern Tuva.

The basin is part of a combination of raised lands and hollows located throughout the Tannu-Ola and Altai mountainous regions, where the world's most northern desert meets the Northern Hemisphere's most southern tundra zone. An area of 10,560 km^{2} (4,080 mi^{2}), around three quarters of which lies in Mongolia, was designated Biosphere Reserve in 1997, and a partly overlapping zone of around the same size was designated UNESCO World Heritage in 2003. The Mongolian part of the lake and its immediate surroundings were further adopted as Ramsar wetland in 2004.

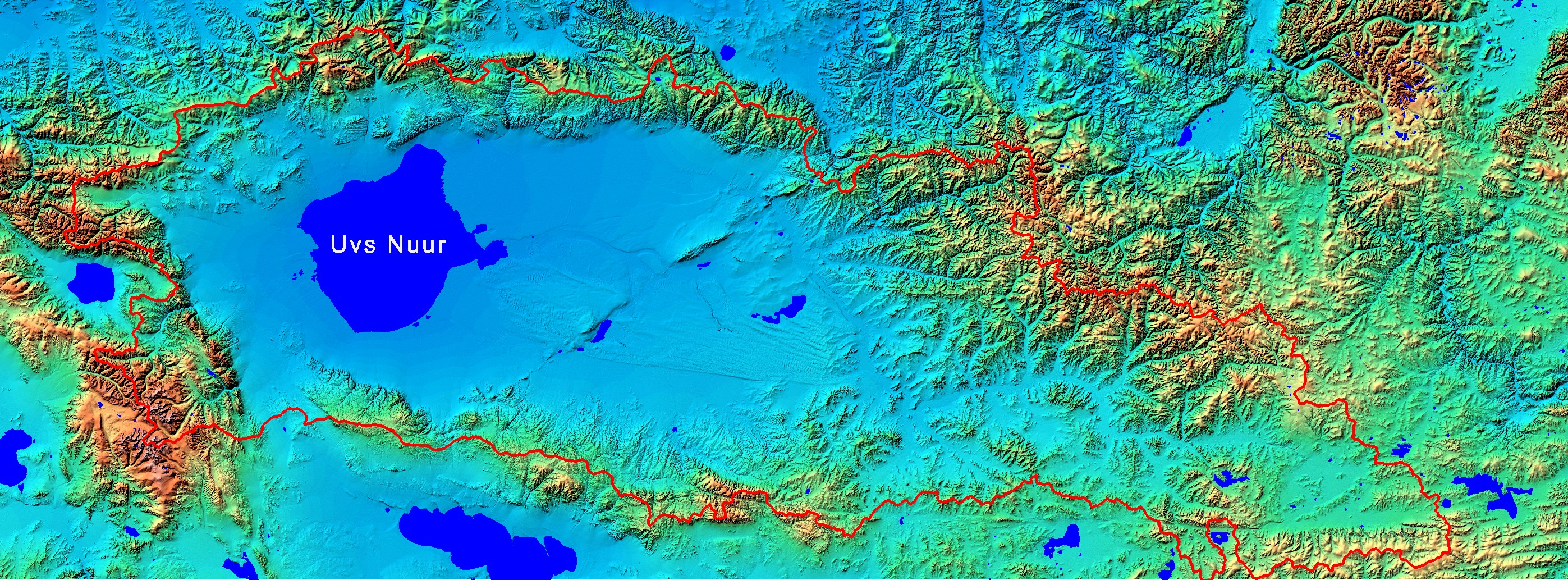
Ubsunur Hollow covers the western part of the Uvs Nuur drainage basin

== Geography ==
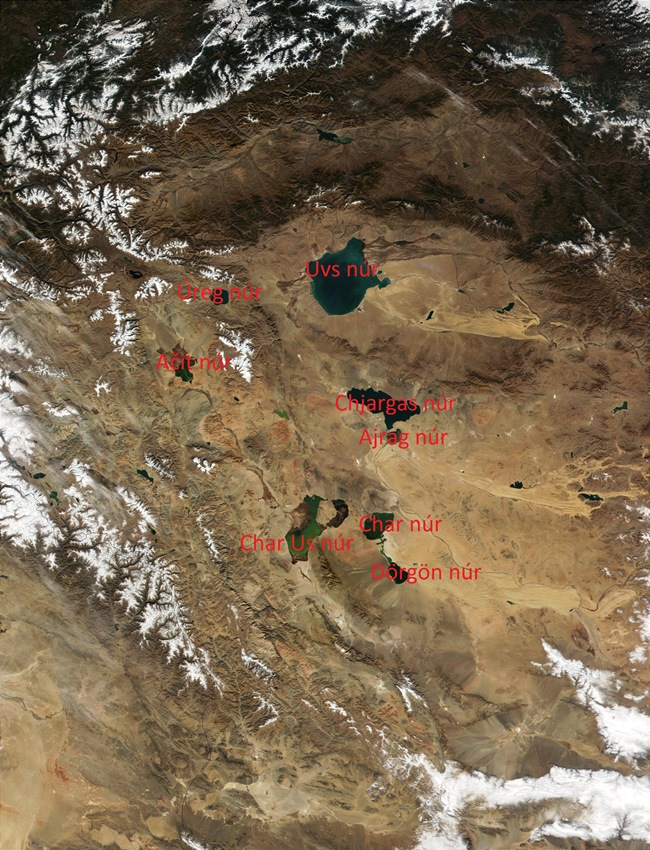
Great Lakes Depression (satellite, with names of lakes)

The Tannu-Ola mountains form the northern border of Ubsunur Hollow. Tere-Khol' Lake, the only freshwater lake of the basin, lies on the Russian-Mongolian border. The more eastern part of the Uvs Lake drainage basin extends in the north to the Sengilen ridge of the Sayan Mountains, and in the east to the basin of Sangiin Dalai Lake. The southern part of the hollow is bordered by the basin of Khyargas Lake, with the Khan Khökhii mountains separating both basins of the Great Lakes Depression. More to the east, the Bulnai mountain range forms the southern border of Uvs Lake's drainage basin. West of the Uvs Lake Basin lies the endorheic basin of Üüreg Lake, bordered by the Altai Mountains. The Tsagan-Shibetu ridge separates, in part, the Uvs and Üüreg lake basins. The south-western tip of the Uvs Lake Basin covers most of the Türgen Uul range, and includes the north-eastern slopes of Harhiraa mountain.

== Archaeology ==
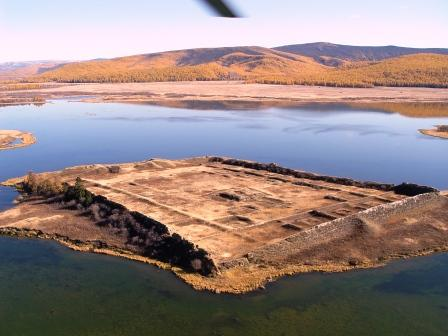
Por-Bazhyn, shortly before the 2007–2008 excavations

According to Greenpeace, Ubsunur Hollow counts 40,000 archaeological sites from nomadic Scythians, Turks, Huns and other tribes. A number of its archaeological artefacts remain unstudied. In Central Asia, it has the highest concentration of burial mounds, constituting around half of its archaeological sites, and many of which are older than the Egyptian pyramids. Thousands of rock carvings and stone sculptures remain from medieval settlements and Buddhist temples.

Archaeological searches carried out in 2007–2008 on the Por-Bazhyn ruins, which are situated on an islet in the Russian part of Tere-Khol' Lake, suggest that the enclosure was built around the middle of the second half of the 8th century, under the Uyghur Khaganate.

== Population ==
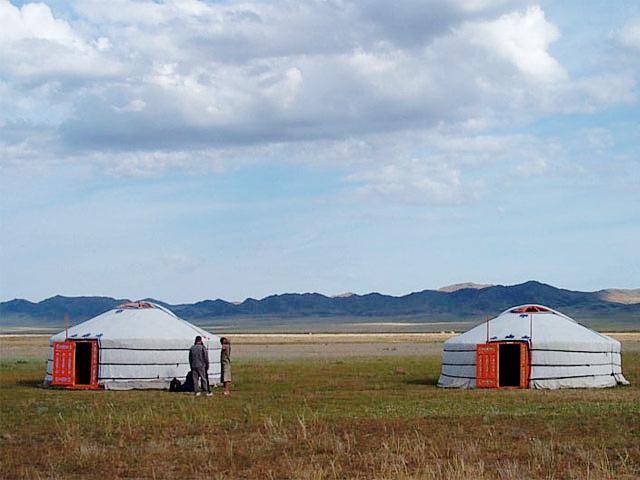
Yurts

The population density is low in the Ubsunur Hollow. On both sides of the border, it is populated almost exclusively by the nomadic Tuvan people and cattle breeders living in yurts. The lack of industry and the reliance of the inhabitants on traditional ways of life, such as nomadic pasturing, have had little impact on the landscape and have allowed the ecosystem to remain relatively free from the negative effects that human presence can impose.

== Flora and fauna ==
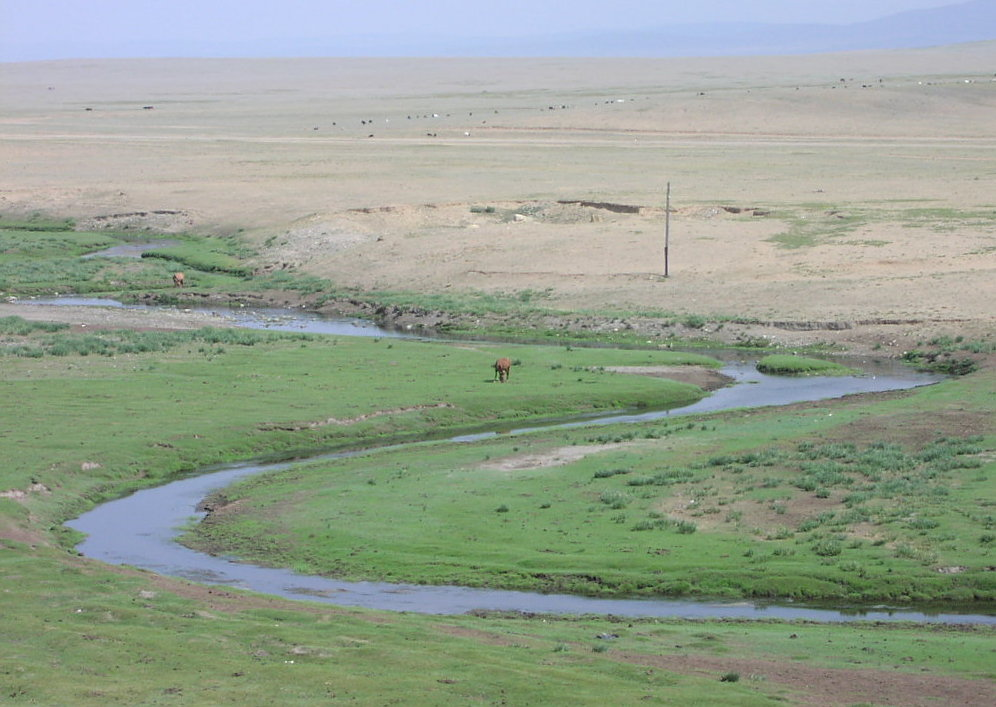
Mongolian steppe

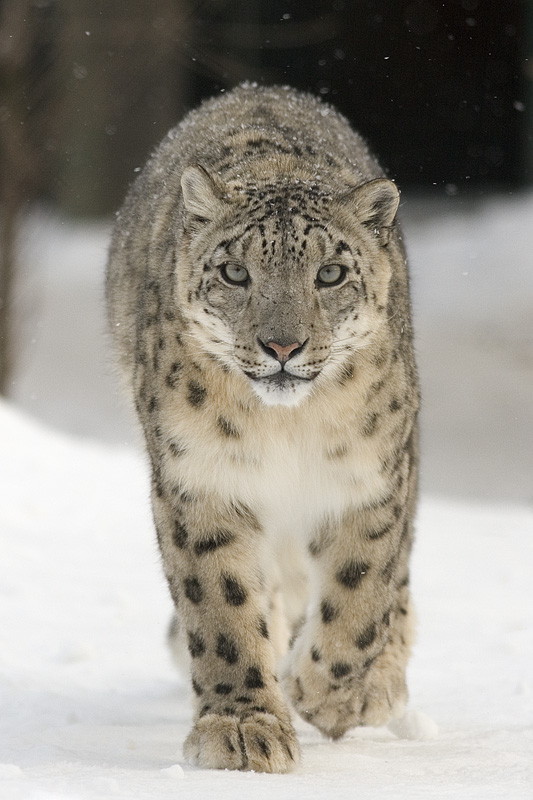
Snow leopard

The hollow, located on the border between Mongolia and Russia, lies at the intersection of complex ecosystems. Its area is 10,688 km^{2} (4,127 mi^{2}). The terrain includes glaciers, desert, alpine tundra, sub alpine meadows, and a vast mountain taiga areas. There are also forested steppes, treeless steppes, semi-arid deserts, and sand dunes. It is a diversified natural habitat, producing an interaction of Euro-Siberian and Central Asian-Mongolian plant and animal life.

Due to its location on the cusp of the Siberian and Central Asian-Mongolian terrains, the flora and fauna of the hollow exhibit a high biodiversity for mid-latitudes. Animal species that inhabit both mountains and tundra, such as the Siberian roe deer and Altai snowcock, flourish here. The endangered snow leopard is also present, as well as taiga dwellers such as the Caspian red deer, lynx and wolverine. Steppe dwellers include the Mongolian lark, demoiselle crane and long-tailed Siberian squirrel. Desert inhabitants include the bustard and midday gerbil. The bird species number some 359. Since the hollow is a protected area, many ancient species extinct in other regions have found refuge here.

== Conservation instruments ==
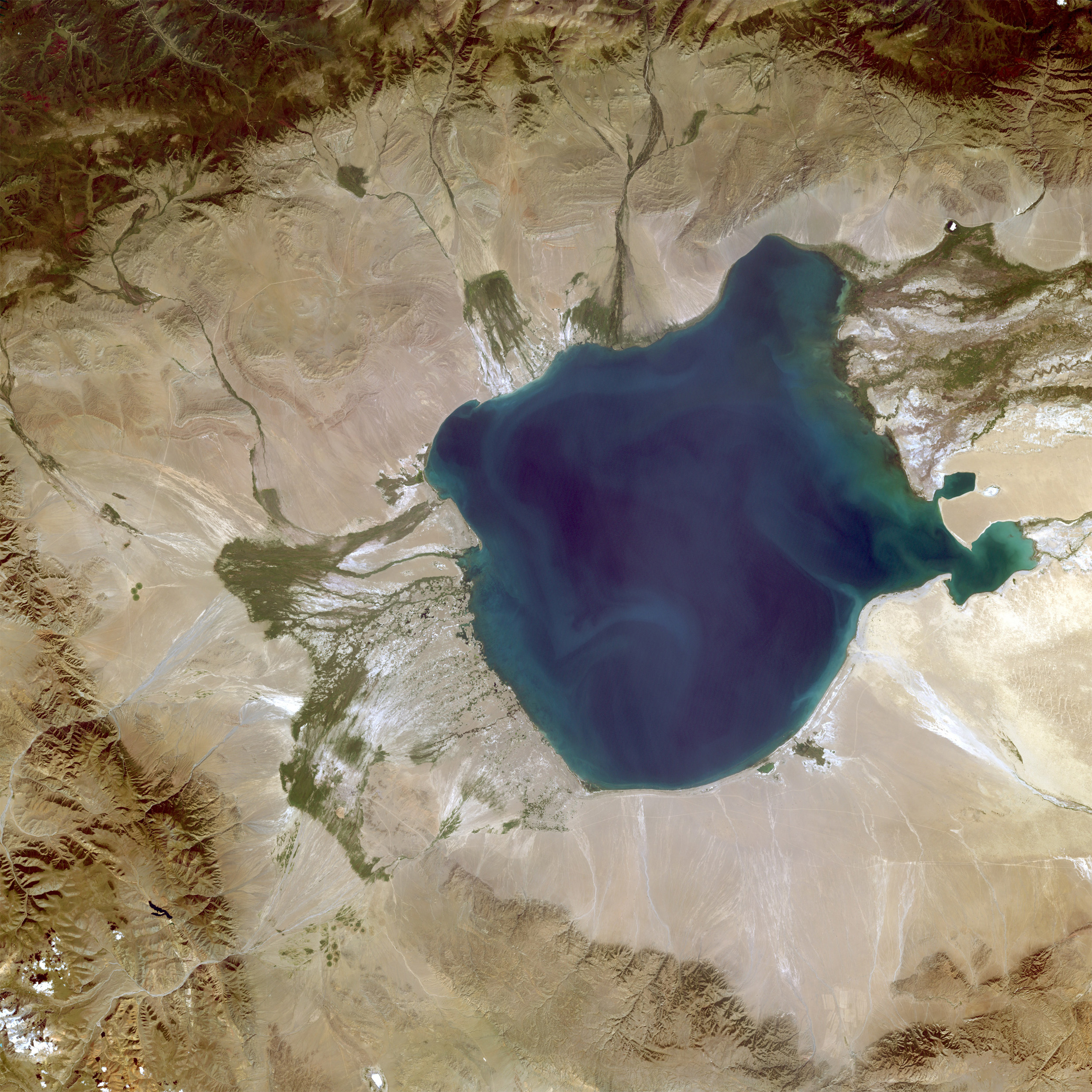
Uvs Nuur Hollow (satellite)

In 1993 Russia protected the Tuvan parts of Ubsunur Hollow as the Ubsunurskaya Kotlovina State Nature Biosphere Reserve. In 1995 Greenpeace Russia prepared its proposal to nominate Ubsunur Hollow, in conjunction with Mongolia, as World Heritage Site, describing it as "one of the largest intact watersheds in Central Asia".

Conservation instruments for the Uvs Lake Basin
	Biosphere Reserve		World Heritage		Other instruments
	Designation	Components	Designation	Components	Other instruments
Tuva, Russia	Ubsunorskaya Kotlovina (1997): Core area: 558 km^{2} (215 sq mi); Buffer zone: 2,285 km^{2} (882 sq mi)	unit 1; unit 2; unit 3; unit 4; unit 5	Uvs Nuur Basin (No. 769rev, 2003): Core area: 8,981 km^{2} (3,468 sq mi); Buffer zone: 1,708 km^{2} (659 sq mi)	1. Mongun Taiga; 2. Ubsu-Nur; 3. Oroku-Shinaa; 4. Aryskannyg; 5. Jamaalyg; 6. Tsugeer els 7. Ular; 8. Tsagan shuvuut 9. Turgen; 10. Uvs Lake; 11. Altan els 12. Tes River	State Nature Biosphere Reserve
Tuva, Russia	Ubsunorskaya Kotlovina (1997): Core area: 558 km^{2} (215 sq mi); Buffer zone: 2,285 km^{2} (882 sq mi)	unit 1; unit 2; unit 3; unit 4; unit 5	Uvs Nuur Basin (No. 769rev, 2003): Core area: 8,981 km^{2} (3,468 sq mi); Buffer zone: 1,708 km^{2} (659 sq mi)	1. Mongun Taiga; 2. Ubsu-Nur; 3. Oroku-Shinaa; 4. Aryskannyg; 5. Jamaalyg; 6. Tsugeer els 7. Ular; 8. Tsagan shuvuut 9. Turgen; 10. Uvs Lake; 11. Altan els 12. Tes River	Ubsunurskaya Kotlovina (No. 667010, 1993)
Mongolia	Uvs Nuur Basin (1997): Core area: 3,661 km^{2} (1,414 sq mi); Buffer zone: 4,056 km^{2} (1,566 sq mi)	Uvs Nuur unit; Turgen Uul unit; Altan Els unit; Tsaagan Shovod unit	Uvs Nuur Basin (No. 769rev, 2003): Core area: 8,981 km^{2} (3,468 sq mi); Buffer zone: 1,708 km^{2} (659 sq mi)	1. Mongun Taiga; 2. Ubsu-Nur; 3. Oroku-Shinaa; 4. Aryskannyg; 5. Jamaalyg; 6. Tsugeer els 7. Ular; 8. Tsagan shuvuut 9. Turgen; 10. Uvs Lake; 11. Altan els 12. Tes River	Ramsar Wetland
Mongolia	Uvs Nuur Basin (1997): Core area: 3,661 km^{2} (1,414 sq mi); Buffer zone: 4,056 km^{2} (1,566 sq mi)	Uvs Nuur unit; Turgen Uul unit; Altan Els unit; Tsaagan Shovod unit	Uvs Nuur Basin (No. 769rev, 2003): Core area: 8,981 km^{2} (3,468 sq mi); Buffer zone: 1,708 km^{2} (659 sq mi)	1. Mongun Taiga; 2. Ubsu-Nur; 3. Oroku-Shinaa; 4. Aryskannyg; 5. Jamaalyg; 6. Tsugeer els 7. Ular; 8. Tsagan shuvuut 9. Turgen; 10. Uvs Lake; 11. Altan els 12. Tes River	Lake Uvs and its surrounding wetlands (No. 1379, 2004): Area: 5,850 km^{2} (2,260 sq mi)

=== Biosphere Reserve ===
Ubsunur Hollow Biosphere Reserve is a fragile mountain hollow or depression located on the territorial border of Mongolia and the Republic of Tuva among the mountains part of a combination of raised lands and depressions. Ubsunur Hollow Reserve (Tuva) was awarded international Biosphere Reserve status in 1998, as a step toward protecting Southern Siberia's wilderness which contain Russia's largest intact tracts of Siberian Pine and Siberian Fir-dominated ecosystems.

=== World Heritage Site ===
Ubsunur Hollow was nominated for inclusion in Russia's second World Heritage Site (the first being the Virgin Komi Forests) in 1995 as "one of the largest intact watersheds in Central Asia where up to 40,000 unexcavated burial mounds and other archaeological sites can be found from historically famous nomadic tribes such as the Scythians, the Turks and the Huns." The nomination was submitted in conjunction with the Tuva Republic and Mongolia and included 75,000 square kilometres of forest and steppe and associated cultural and natural heritage.

The Uvs Lake Basin World Heritage Site, designated as 769rev in 2003, includes:

1. Mongun Taiga, Russia (50°12′N 90°12′E), west of the Uvs Lake drainage basin.
2. Ubsu-Nur, Russia (50°37′N 93°8′E), area at the north-eastern tip of Uvs Lake.
3. Oroku-Shinaa, Russia (50°37′N 94°0′E), northern part of the zone around the Tes River, adjacent to part 12 on the Mongolian side.
4. Aryskannyg, Russia (50°40′N 94°44′E), east of the previous zone, partly in the Tannu-Ola mountains
5. Jamaalyg, Russia (50°15′N 94°45′E), west of Erzin
6. Tsugeer els, Russia (50°5′N 95°15′E), northern part of Tere-Khol' Lake, and environs
7. Ular, Russia (50°32′N 5°38′E), situated in the western part of the Sengilen ridge
8. Tsagan shuvuut, Mongolia (50°19′N 91°9′E), part of the Tsagan-Shibetu ridge
9. Turgen, Mongolia (49°46′N 91°22′E), mountain range south of Üüreg Lake, near Türgen, Uvs.
10. Uvs Lake, Mongolia (50°20′N 92°53′E), bulk of the Uvs Lake zone
11. Altan els, Mongolia (49°50′N 5°0′E), sand dune region south of Tere-Khol' Lake, including the Mongolian part of that lake
12. Tes River, Mongolia (50°28′N 93°45′E), zone between the delta at Uvs Lake and the Russian border

== See also ==
- Nomad
- Tuvans
