= Khar-Us Lake (Uvs) =

Lake in Uvs Province, Mongolia

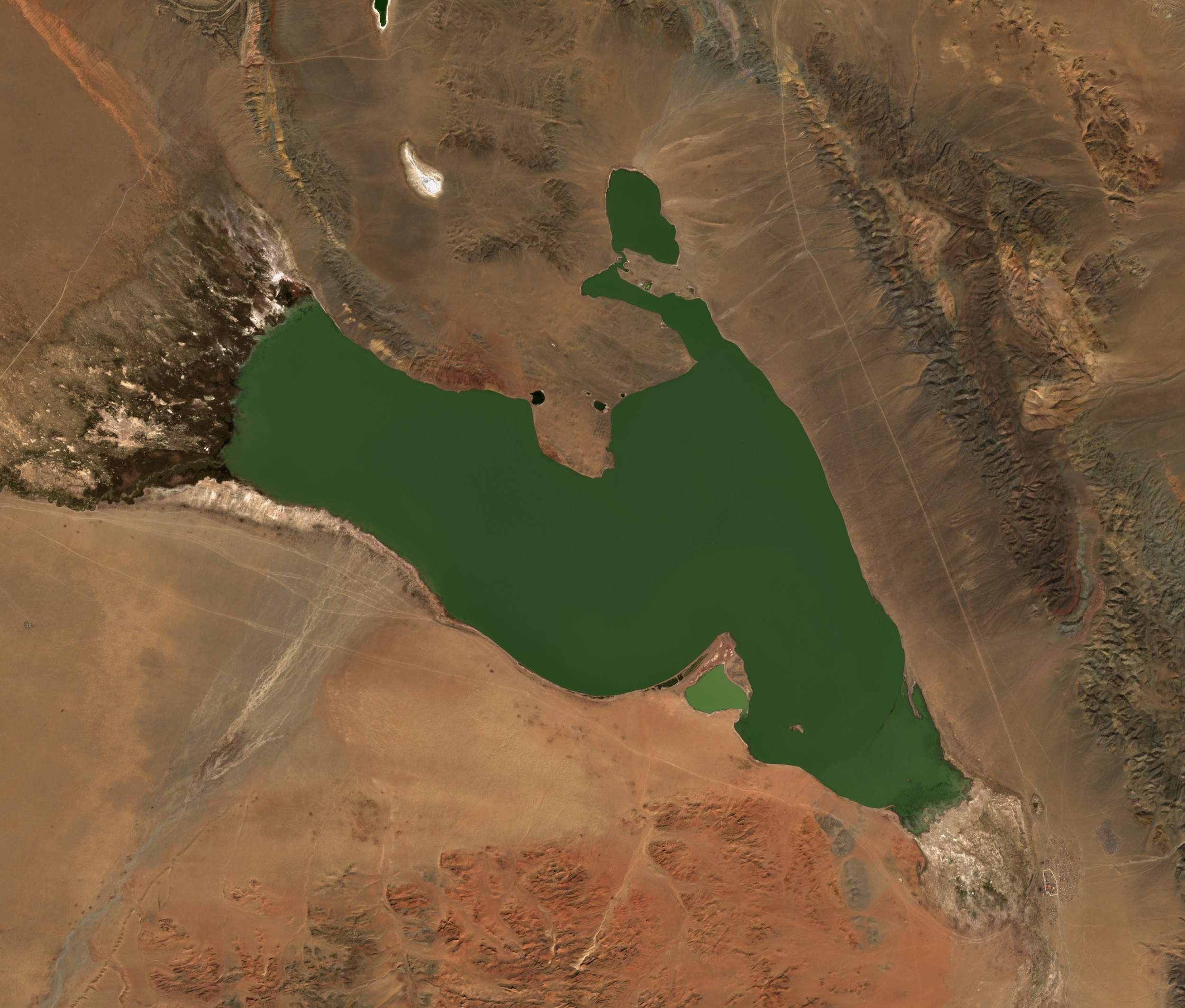

- Location within Mongolia
- Location: Uvs Province, Mongolia
- Coordinates: 49°6′0″N 91°52′0″E
- Basin countries: Mongolia
- Max. length: 19 km (12 mi)
- Max. width: 7.8 km (4.8 mi)
- Surface area: 63 km^{2} (24 sq mi)
- Average depth: 5.2 m (17 ft)
- Max. depth: 8.2 m (27 ft)
- Water volume: 0.3265 km^{3} (264,700 acre⋅ft)
- Surface elevation: 1,574 m (5,164 ft)

Khar-Us Lake (Mongolian: Хар-Ус нуур, ᠬᠠᠷ᠎ᠠ ᠤᠰᠤ ᠨᠠᠭᠤᠷ, lit. "black water lake") or Uvsiin Khar-Us Lake is a lake located in western Mongolia in the Uvs Province between the districts of Ömnögovi and Ölgii. Khar-Us Lake is located south of the city of Ulaangom and about 80 km (50 mi) north of the homonymous and larger Khar-Us Lake in the Khovd Province.

== Climate ==
The climate is cold. The average temperature is 1 °C. The warmest month is July, at 21 °C, and the coldest is January, at -22 °C. The average rainfall is 420 millimeters per year. The wettest month is June, with 103 millimeters of rain, and the driest is March, with 2 millimeters.
