= Turgen =

Turgen may refer to:

- Türgen, a mountain in Mongolia
- Türgen, Uvs, a district in western Mongolia
- Turgen, Kazakhstan, a village in the Almaty Province, Kazakhstan
- Turgen, Russia, a rural locality (a selo) in Zabaykalsky Krai, Russia
