= Erzin =

Erzin may refer to:

- Erzin, Turkey, a city in Turkey
- Erzin, Russia, a rural locality (a selo) in the Tuva Republic, Russia
- Erzin River, a river in the Tuva Republic, Russia

== See also ==
- Erzincan
- Erzinsky District
