= Khangai =

Khangai (Mongolian: Хангай) can specify:

- Khangai Mountains, a mountain range in Mongolia

named after the Mountains:

- two Aimags (provinces) of Mongolia:
  - Arkhangai Province
  - Övörkhangai Province
- several Sums (districts) in different Aimags:
  - Khangai, Arkhangai
  - Öndörkhangai, Uvs
  - Züünkhangai, Uvs
- Hanggai (village), a village in Tabusai, Tumed Left Banner, Hohhot, Inner Mongolia, China
- Hanggai (band), a folk group from Beijing specialising in a blend of Mongolian folk music and modern music
- Hanggai, Zhejiang (Chinese: 杭垓镇), a town in Anji County, Zhejiang, China
