= Mongun-Taiga =

Massif in Tuva, Russia

Möngün-Taiga
- Tuvan: Mөңgүn-Taiga
- Location within Russia

Highest point
- Elevation: 3,970 m (13,020 ft)
- Prominence: 1,685 m (5,528 ft)
- Listing: Mountains of Russia, Ultra, Ribu
- Coordinates: 50°16′46″N 90°07′12″E

Geography
- Country: Russia
- Republic: Tuva
- District: Mongun-Tayginsky
- Parent range: Altai

Geology
- Mountain type: massif

Möngün-Taiga, also known as Mungun-Taiga (Tuvan: Мөңгүн-Тайга - Silver Mountain) is a massif in Mongun-Taiga kozhuun, Russia. The Russian part of the Altai Mountains is considered part of Western Siberia, but Möngün-Taiga in 1932 was transferred (along with the north of Uvs Nuur Basin) from the Mongolian People's Republic of Tuva, and in 1944 became part of Eastern Siberia.

== See also ==
- List of highest points of Russian federal subjects
