= Nuurst Khotgor coal mine =

Mine in Bökhmörön, Uvs, Mongolia

Nuurst Khotgor Coal Mine
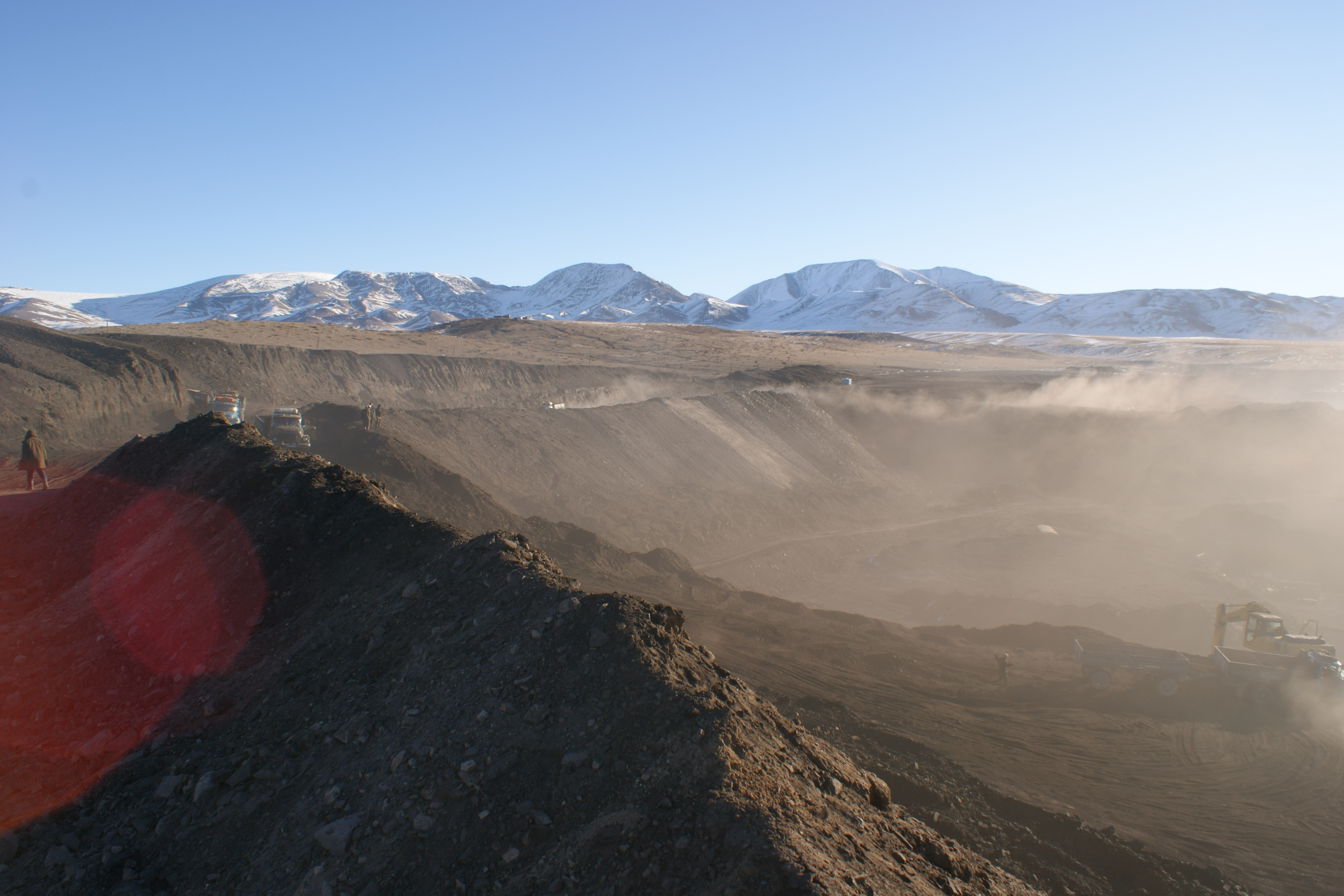

- Location within Mongolia
- Location: Bökhmörön, Uvs, Mongolia; 49°51′12″N 90°53′23″E
- Products: Coking coal
- Opened: 1963

The Nuurst Khotgor Coal Mine (Mongolian: Нүүрст хотгор, Coal bowl) is an open-pit coal mine in Bökhmörön sum (district) of Uvs Province, Mongolia.

The mine has coal reserves amounting to 109 million tonnes of coking coal, one of the largest coal reserves in Asia and the world. The mine has an annual production capacity of 1 million tonnes of coal.

Originally the mine was state property, but has been privatized in 2001. In 2010 Korea Coal Corporation acquired 51% of the business.

== History ==
The mine began its extraction activities in 1963.
