= Tsagaankhairkhan =

Tsagaankhairkhan (Mongolian: Цагаанхайрхан, white mountain) is the name of two sums (districts) in different aimags (provinces) of Mongolia:

- Tsagaankhairkhan, Uvs
- Tsagaankhairkhan, Zavkhan
