= Üüreg Lake =

Lake in Sagil, Uvs, Mongolia

Üüreg Lake Үүрэг нуур ᠡᠭᠦᠷᠭᠡ ᠨᠠᠭᠤᠷ
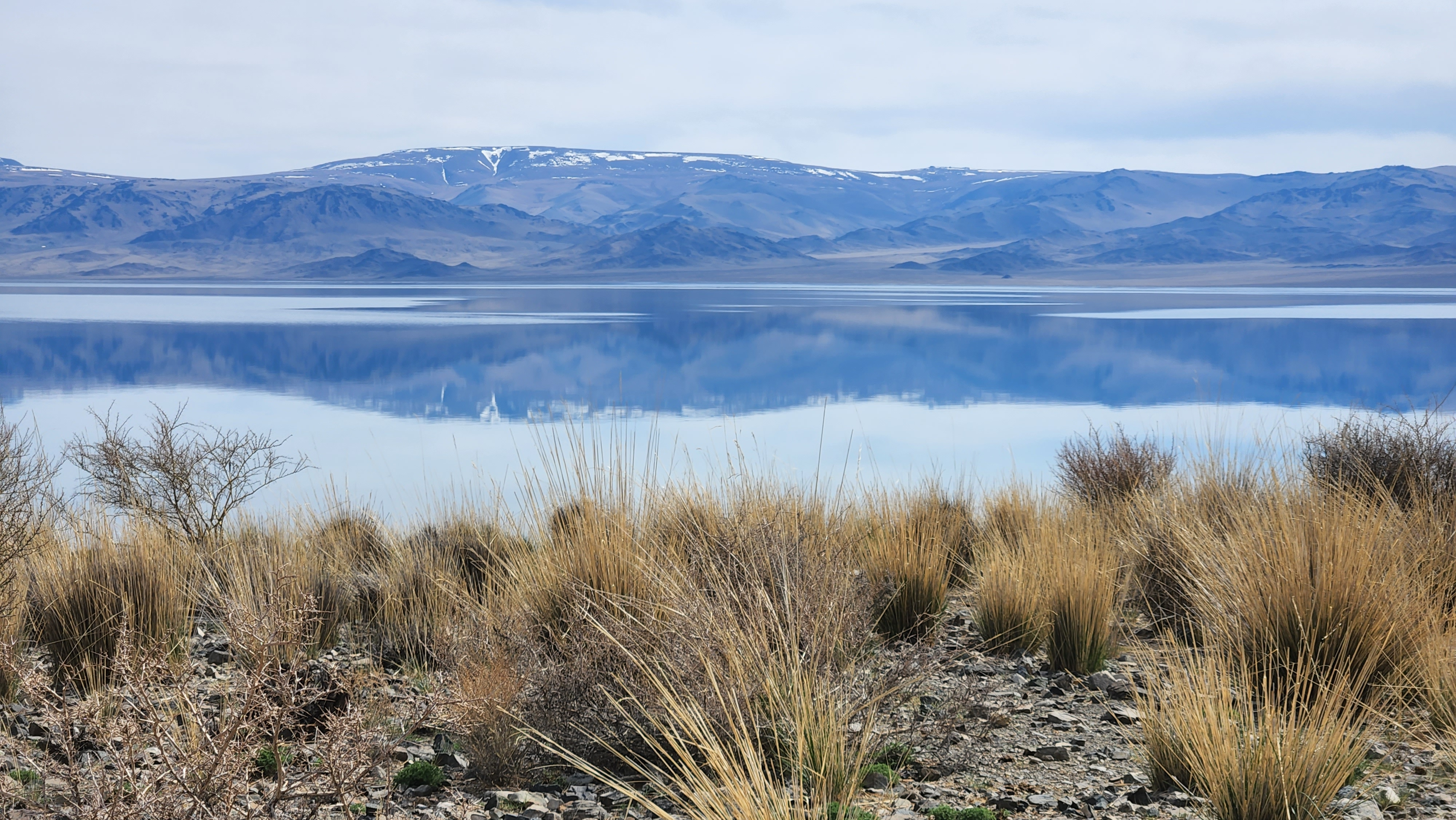
- Lake and landscape, 2022

- Location within Mongolia
- Coordinates: 50°10′N 91°00′E
- Type: salt lake
- Basin countries: Mongolia (Uvs Province)
- Max. length: 20 km (12 mi)
- Max. width: 18 km (11 mi)
- Surface area: 239 km^{2} (92 sq mi)
- Average depth: 26.9 m (88 ft)
- Max. depth: 42 m (138 ft)
- Water volume: 6.419 km^{3} (1.540 cu mi)
- Surface elevation: 1,425 m (4,675 ft)

Üüreg Lake (Mongolian: Үүрэг нуур, ᠡᠭᠦᠷᠭᠡ ᠨᠠᠭᠤᠷ, Üüreg nuur) is a saline lake in an endorheic basin in Sagil, Uvs Province, Mongolia, north-west of the Great Lakes Hollow, near the western edge of the Uvs Nuur basin. The Tsagaan river gorge (Tsagaan Shuvuut Uul) lies on the west side of the lake.

== Geography ==
The shores of the lake are slightly sloping and smooth, without bays or peninsulas. Several rivers flow into the lake, but most are intermittent. The largest river with a constant flow is the Khari River, which flows into the northwest of the lake. Swamp-type shrubs and swamps grow near the mouth of the Khari River. The lake water is salty due to high evaporation and no outflow.

The Üüreg Lake depression is a desert, so there is a lot of evaporation from the water surface. The average annual evaporation is 800-900 mm. In addition to the inflow of rivers, this water loss is offset by rainfall and groundwater. The general salinity of the water is 4.17 g/L.

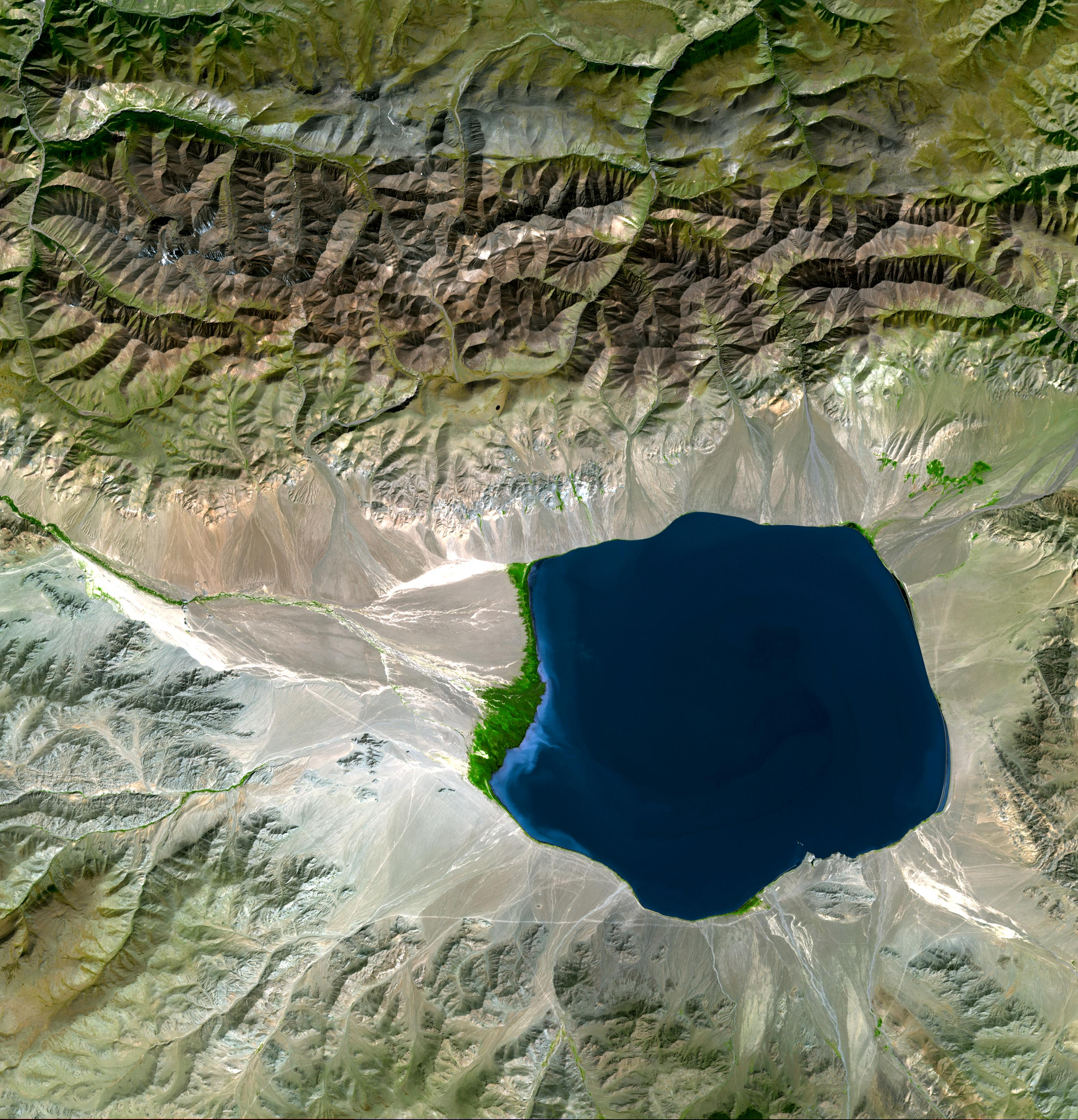
Satellite view

== Flora and fauna ==
Khankhukhii Mountain, Tokhtoshin-Shil Mountains, Kharkhiraa Turgen mountains, Ulias glass forest [sic], high mountain, rock argali, ram, deer, antelope, leopard, lynx, ibex, marten, pig, wolf, roe deer, fox, squirrel, ptarmigan, rain, Siberian capercaillie, partridge, hazel grouse, mountain hare, Siberian chipmunk, corsac fox, manul, badger, stinking brown [sic], artichoke, rabbit, marmot, squirrel, rainbow partridge [sic], Mongolian five-toed jerboa, desman, Mongolian ground jay, bozlog and other animals and plants.

The lake is home to various birds such as waterfowl (swans, geese, ducks), Mongolian gull, pelicans, and others. The lake has fish, including Mongolian grayling (Thymallus brevirostris) and Altai carp.
