= Museum of Uvs Province =

Museum in Ulaangom, Uvs, Mongolia

- Увс Аймгийн Музей
- Established: 1948
- Location: Ulaangom, Uvs, Mongolia
- Coordinates: 49°59′00.1″N 92°03′46.9″E
- Type: museum

The Museum of Uvs Province (Mongolian: Увс Аймгийн Музей) is a museum in Ulaangom, Uvs Province, Mongolia.

== History ==
The museum was originally established in 1948 as a local research facility and museum. In 1971, it was upgraded into a provincial museum of Uvs Province.

== Architecture ==
The museum consists of natural hall, history and ethnography hall and modern hall.

== See also ==
- List of museums in Mongolia
