= Ömnögovi =

Ömnögovi (Mongolian: Өмнөговь, south gobi) may refer to:

- Ömnögovi Province, an aimag of Mongolia
- Ömnögovi, Uvs, a sum (district) in Uvs Aimag of Mongolia
