= Bökhmörön, Uvs =

District in Uvs Province, Mongolia

Coordinates: 49°39′46″N 90°17′26″E

Bökhmörön District Бөхмөрөн сум ᠪᠥᠬᠡᠮᠥ᠋ᠷᠡᠨᠰᠤᠮᠤ
- District
- Interactive map of Bökhmörön District
- Country: Mongolia
- Province: Uvs Province

Area
  - Total: 3,751 km^{2} (1,448 sq mi)
- Time zone: UTC+7 (UTC + 7)

Bökhmörön (Mongolian: Бөхмөрөн) is a sum (district) of Uvs Province in western Mongolia.

== Geography ==
Bökhmörön is the western most district in Uvs Province. It is situated in the Achit Nuur lake depression, sum center is 20 km NW from lake at the top part of Bökhmörön river delta. Eastern part of the sum is situated in Kharkhiraa-Türgen mountains SW of lake Üüreg Lake. The sum is on the border of Mongolia and Russia in the west it borders to Bayan-Ölgii Province.

== Administrative divisions ==
The district is divided into three bags, which are:

- Baishint
- Gurvan jigertei
- Khar altat

== Economy ==
Nuurst Khotgor coal mine is in the eastern part of the sum.
