= Tarialan, Uvs =

District in Uvs Province, Mongolia

Coordinates: 49°46′50″N 91°54′08″E

Tarialan District Тариалан сум ᠲᠠᠷᠢᠶ᠋ᠠᠯᠠᠩᠰᠤᠮᠤ
- District
- Interactive map of Tarialan District
- Country: Mongolia
- Province: Uvs Province

Area
  - Total: 2,505 km^{2} (967 sq mi)
- Time zone: UTC+7 (UTC + 7)

Tarialan (Mongolian: Тариалан, field) is a sum (district) of Uvs Province in western Mongolia.

It is the closest sum to Ulaangom, only about 30 km away from the provincial capital. The center of the sum is on Kharkhiraa river coming out of the Kharkhiraa mountain.

It is home to the Khoton speakers of the Oirat language. The Khoton practice a syncretic religion incorporating elements from Islam, Tibetan Buddhism and Tengri shamanism.

== Administrative divisions ==
The district is divided into six bags, which are:

- Burgastai
- Kharkhiraa
- Khukhuu
- Myangan
- Tarvagatai
- Toli
