= Khotons =

Mongol ethnic group in Mongolia

Khoton
Regions with significant populations
- Mongolia: 12,057 (2020)
- China: 1,200 (2004)

Languages
- Oirat, historically Uyghur (Khoton)

Religion
- Sunni Islam (which includes elements of Buddhism and Shamanism)

Related ethnic groups
- Uyghurs, Uzbeks, Huis, Dörbets

The Khoton or Qotung people (Mongolian: Хотон (ястан)) are a Mongolian-speaking ethnic group in (Outer) Mongolia and Inner Mongolia. Most Mongolian Khotons live in Uvs Province in western Mongolia. In China, the Khotons (often called Qotungs) live in Inner Mongolia, concentrated in Alxa League and are classified as ethnic Mongols. They speak the Dörbet or Alasha dialect of the Oirat language. According to the Great Russian Encyclopedia, modern Khoton people are a part of the "Mongols — a group of peoples who speak Mongolian languages".

== Demography ==
In Mongolia, most Khotons live in Uvs Province, especially in Tarialan, Naranbulag and Ulaangom. There were officially about 6,100 Khotons in 1989. In 2020, there were around 12,057 Khotons in Mongolia.

According to a 2014 estimate from The Mongolian Muslim Association, there are approximately 20,000 Khotons residing primarily in the province of Uvs.

The Khotons of Inner Mongolia reside in Alxa League, mainly in Alxa Left Banner. Some also live in Bayannuur. A 2004 study reported that Khoton informants estimated their total population to be about 1,200.

Historical population in Mongolia
Year	Pop.	±%
1956	2,603	—
1963	2,874	+10.4%
1969	4,056	+41.1%
1979	4,380	+8.0%
1989	6,076	+38.7%
2000	9,014	+48.4%
2010	11,304	+25.4%
2020	12,057	+6.7%
Source: National Statistical Office of Mongolia

== History ==
Khoton, Khotong or Qotung was originally a Mongol term for Muslim Uyghur and Hui people, or Chinese language-speaking Muslims. However, while the term historically included multiple groups, modern research indicates that the Khotons are not directly related to the Hui people. Instead, the Khotons have distinct origins, being primarily descendants of Turkic peoples brought to Mongolia by the Oirats or who migrated there during historical conflicts, particularly during the 17th and 18th centuries.

The Khotons were settled in Mongolia by the Oirats when the latter conquered Xinjiang and took their city-dwelling ancestors to Mongolia. According to another version, they settled in Mongolia after 1753, when their leader, the Dörbet Prince Tseren Ubashi, surrendered to the Qing Dynasty. The Khotons soon adapted and assimilated Mongolian or Oirat culture and speech. According to some scholars, the Khotons can be considered Mongolized Uyghurs as a result.

The Khotons of Inner Mongolia that reside in Alxa League are considered to be descended of Turkic peoples originally from Hami, Xinjiang, who later adopted and assimilated into local Mongol culture. Most scholars believe that the ancestors of the Khotons were brought to the area around the 18th century or earlier as captives from Xinjiang after the prince of the Alasha Mongols returned from fighting the Dzungars. According to local tradition, the ancestors of the Khotons arrived in the area in the late 17th century as merchants and eventually settled and assimilated with the Alasha Mongols. Occasional later migrants from Xinjiang and some Hui from nearby regions who were incorporated into the Khotons helped to maintain and increase their community.

Tseveen et al. (2026) argue that the Dzungar rulers relocated sedentary Muslim agriculturalists from the Tarim Basin into western Mongolia, where they introduced irrigation, grain cultivation and handicrafts into a predominantly pastoral economy. The ancestors of the Khotons are linked with several Turkic-speaking Muslim populations, including Uyghurs, Taranchi, Sarts, Kyrgyz, Kazakhs and Uzbeks.

=== Etymology ===
The origin of the ethnonym is debated. Some scholars connect it with Hotan in Xinjiang, others with the Mongolian khot ("town, settlement"), while another view holds that the Oirats used it broadly for sedentary Muslims.

=== Theories of origin ===
Three models of Khoton origins can be distinguished: descent from Uyghur-speaking agriculturalists relocated from the Tarim Basin; an association with Central Asian categories such as Sarts or Taranchis, which referred to occupation and settlement rather than ethnicity; and a mixed-origin model, which is increasingly favoured.

== Genetics ==
A 2005 study analysed X-chromosome SNPs in Khoton Mongolians. The genetic evidence has been interpreted as indicating a mixed Central Asian profile distinct from neighbouring Mongolian populations, though existing studies remain preliminary.

== Culture ==
Unlike most Mongolians, Khotons follow a form of Islam that has Buddhist and traditional elements (like Tengrism). They traditionally avoid intermarriage with other ethnic groups and tend to avoid mainstream Mongolian written culture.

In Inner Mongolia, many Khotons are pastoral nomads though in recent times, an increasing amount are now settled.

Khoton Islam is described as largely orally transmitted and localised, with Arabic formulas such as the basmala surviving in blessings, funeral, childbirth and healing rites in altered phonological forms, alongside elements of Mongolian ritual and ancestral reverence. Many Khotons trace their ancestry to places such as Kashgar, Hotan, Yarkand and Fergana, and women have been important transmitters of domestic and ritual tradition. Interest in Khoton heritage has also been renewed since the 1990s, including the online sharing of photographs, oral histories and songs.

== Language ==
Khotons used to speak the Khoton language (a dialect of the Uyghur language). The language became extinct around the 19th century. Once settled in Mongolia, the Khotons adopted the Dörbet or northern dialect of Oirat. In Inner Mongolia, the Khotons speak the Alasha dialect of Oirat.

The language is classified as Turkic, and its disappearance is described as a gradual language shift to Oirat over several centuries, with Khoton identity persisting through religion and collective memory.

== Notable figures ==
- Dorjsürengiin Sumiyaa

== Bibliography ==
- Fosse, Magdalena (1979). The Khotons of Western Mongolia.
- Tseveen, Erkhembayar; Gal, Tuya; Khurelbaatar, Lutchimeg; Tsogtbayar, Misheel; Erkhembayar, Khosbayar (2026). "The Khoton People of Mongolia". Mongolian Diaspora. doi:10.1515/modi-2026-0028.

== See also ==
- Demographics of Mongolia
- Mongols in China
- Islam in Mongolia
