= Mugur-Aksy =

Rural locality in Tuva, Russia

Mugur-Aksy Мугур-Аксы
- Selo

Other transcription(s)
  - Tuvan: Мугур-Аксы
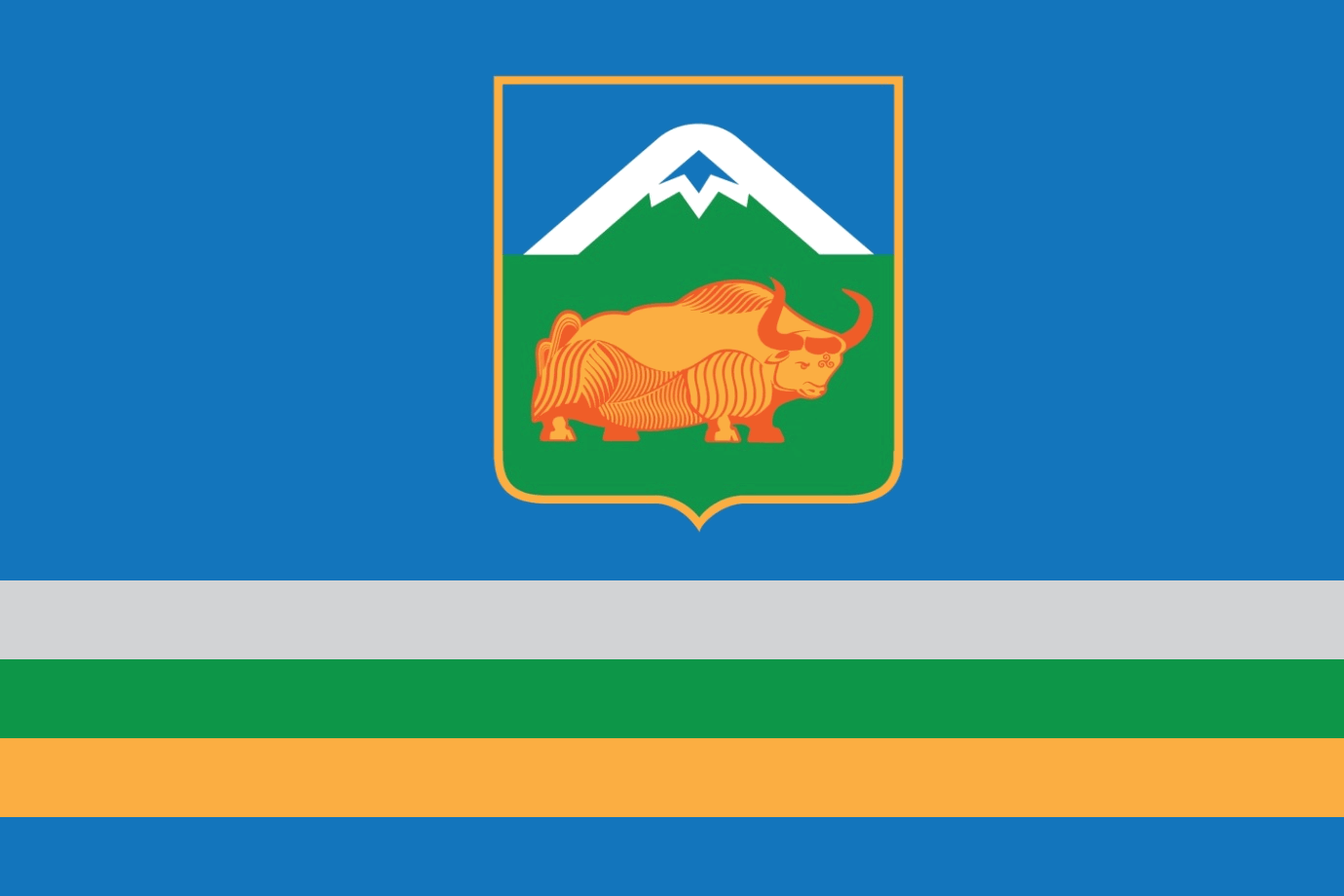
- Flag
- Interactive map of Mugur-Aksy
- Location of Mugur-Aksy Mugur-Aksy (Tuva Republic)
- Coordinates: 50°22′53″N 90°26′34″E
- Country: Russia
- Federal subject: Tuva
- Administrative district: Mongun-Tayginsky District
- SumonSelsoviet: Kargynsky

Population (2010 Census)
  - Total: 5,661
  - Estimate (2021): 4,512 (−20.3%)

Administrative status
  - Capital of: Mongun-Tayginsky District, Kargynsky Sumon

Municipal status
  - Municipal district: Mongun-Tayginsky Municipal District
  - Rural settlement: Kargynsky Sumon Rural Settlement
  - Capital of: Mongun-Tayginsky Municipal District, Kargynsky Sumon Rural Settlement
- Time zone: UTC+7 (MSK+4)
- Postal code: 668020
- OKTMO ID: 93625411101

Mugur-Aksy (Russian: Мугур-Аксы; Tuvan: Мугур-Аксы, romanized: Mugur-Aksı) is a rural locality (a selo) and the administrative center of Mongun-Tayginsky District of Tuva, Russia. Population: 5,661 (2010 census); 4,046 (2002 census); 3,457 (1989 Soviet census).

== Etymology ==
The name is of Turkic origin and consists of two Tuvan words: mugur - “a small drying up dead-end river” and aksy - “a river fed by melt water”.
