= Sagil, Uvs =

District in Uvs Province, Mongolia

Coordinates: 50°20′22″N 91°36′32″E

Sagil District Сагил сум ᠰᠠᠭᠢᠯᠢᠰᠤᠮᠤ
- District
- Interactive map of Sagil District
- Country: Mongolia
- Province: Uvs Province
- Time zone: UTC+7 (UTC + 7)

Sagil (Mongolian: Сагил) is a sum (district) of Uvs Province in western Mongolia.

The main road connecting Ulaangom to Khandagayty, Russia goes 5.5 km east from the center of the sum.

== Geography ==
- Üüreg Lake

== Administrative divisions ==
The district is divided into five bags, which are:

- Bayanzurkh
- Borshoo
- Khar Mod
- Undur Mod
- Uureg Nuur
