= Khoton language =

Extinct Turkic dialect

Khoton
- Hoton
- Native to: Inner Mongolia (China), Mongolia
- Ethnicity: Khotons
- Extinct: 19th century
- Language family: Turkic: Common Turkic; Karluk; Uyghur; Khoton

Language codes
- ISO 639-3: None (mis)
- Glottolog: khot1252

Khoton is an extinct dialect of the Uyghur language in the Karluk group of Turkic languages. Khotons use the Oirat dialect of Mongolic languages in daily life.

== Classification ==
Khoton is classified as Uyghur by various researchers (Boris Vladimirtsov, Alexander Samoylovich, Nikolay Baskakov), an Uzbek dialect by Ármin Vámbéry, a Kyrgyz dialect by Grigory Potanin and Sergey Malov.

Sample words
English	Khoton		Turkish
horse	атӑ (ată)	atặ	at
five	беші̆ (bešĭ)	beşi	beş
foot	бутў (butŭ)	butu	ayak
eye	гӧзӓ̆ (gözä̆), козъ (koz)	gözä	göz
mouth	о̄зӑ (ōză)	o:zặ	ağız
fire	отӑ (otă)	otặ	ateş od
language	тілі̆ (tilĭ)	tili	dil
three	ӱчӱ (üčü)	üçü	üç

1: Archaic usage.

== Mixed nature ==
According to Nikolay Baskakov, Khoton language has q as in oçaq ('firepit') which has Old Uyghur characteristics, teey ('camel') which has Kyrgyz characteristics as in töö; оoz ('mouth') which has Southern Altai characteristics and q: qol (‘arm’) from Turkmen.

== Bibliography ==
- Baskakov, Nikolai (1962). Введение в изучение тюркских языков (in Russian). Moscow.
- Malov, Sergey (1956). Лобнорский язык (in Russian). Frunze (Bishkek): Издательство Ан Киргизской ССР. p. 195.
- Vladimirtsov, Boris; Samoylovich, Alexander. "Турецкий народец хотоны". ЗВОРАО (in Russian). XXIII (3–4). Moscow: 1916.
