= Züünkhangai, Uvs =

District in Uvs Province, Mongolia

Coordinates: 49°18′23″N 95°26′55″E

Züünkhangai District Зүүнхангай сум ᠵᠡᠭᠦᠩᠬᠩᠭ᠋ᠠᠢᠰᠤᠮᠤ
- District
- Interactive map of Züünkhangai District
- Country: Mongolia
- Province: Uvs Province
- Time zone: UTC+7 (UTC + 7)

Züünkhangai (Mongolian: Зүүнхангай) is a sum (district) of Uvs Province in western Mongolia. The sum is in the Khan Khökhii mountains.

== Geography ==
Züünkhangai is the eastern most district in Uvs Province.

== Administrative divisions ==
The district is divided into four bags, which are:

- Bayangol
- Dalanbulag
- Jargalant
- Khairkhan
