= Öndörkhangai, Uvs =

District in Uvs Province, Mongolia

Coordinates: 49°16′17″N 94°51′32″E

Öndörkhangai District Өндөрхангай сум ᠥᠨᠳᠦᠷᠬᠠᠩᠭ᠋ᠠᠢᠰᠤᠮᠤ
- District
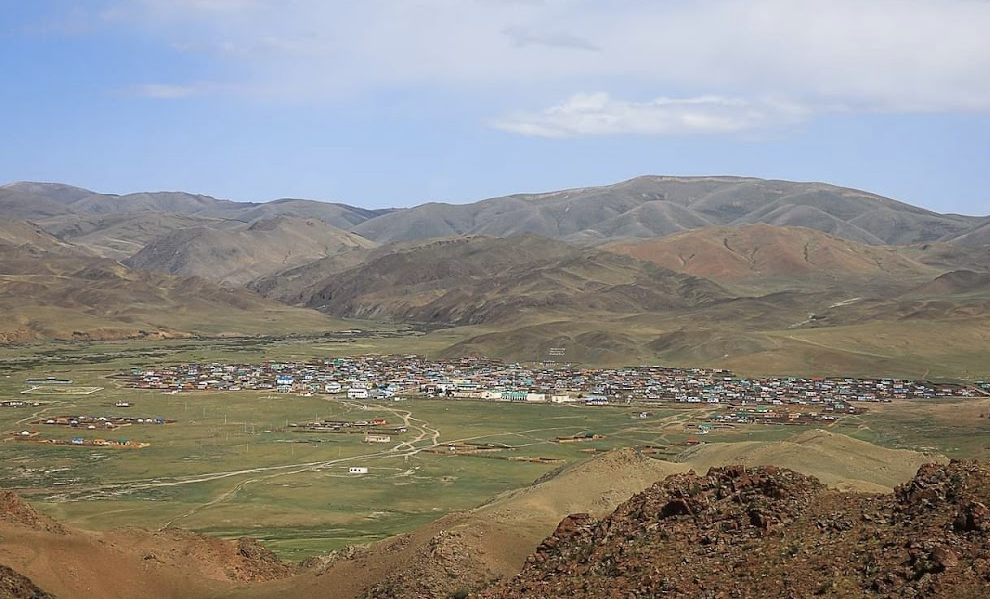
- Interactive map of Öndörkhangai District
- Country: Mongolia
- Province: Uvs Province

Area
  - Total: 4,516 km^{2} (1,744 sq mi)
- Time zone: UTC+7 (UTC + 7)

Öndörkhangai (Mongolian: Өндөрхангай, [ˌɵntɵrχaɴˈɢæ]) is a sum (district) of Uvs Province in western Mongolia.

The sum is in the Khan Khökhii mountains.

== Administrative divisions ==
The district is divided into five bags, which are:

- Batsaikhan
- Jargalant
- Tsagaannuur
- Tsaluu
- Tsetserleg
