= Khovd, Uvs =

District in Uvs Province, Mongolia

Coordinates: 49°16′48″N 90°54′41″E

Khovd District Ховд сум ᠬᠣᠪᠳᠤᠰᠤᠮᠤ
- District
- Interactive map of Khovd District
- Country: Mongolia
- Province: Uvs Province
- Time zone: UTC+7 (UTC + 7)

Khovd (Mongolian: Ховд) is a sum (district) of the Uvs aimag (province) in Mongolia. It is located in the south-west of the aimag, at the border to the Bayan-Ölgii Aimag. It is situated in the Achit Lake depression, sum center is 28 km SE from the lake at the Khovd River left bank. Eastern part of the sum is situated in Kharkhiraa-Türgen mountains.

== Geography ==
- Shaazgai Lake

== Administrative divisions ==
The district is divided into four bags, which are:

- Achit
- Khaliunbulag
- Khovd
- Shiver
