= Züüngovi, Uvs =

District in Uvs Province, Mongolia

Coordinates: 49°54′20″N 93°47′15″E

Züüngovi District Зүүнговь сум ᠵᠡᠭᠦᠩᠭ᠋ᠣᠪᠢᠰᠤᠮᠤ
- District
- Interactive map of Züüngovi District
- Country: Mongolia
- Province: Uvs Province

Population
  - Total: 4,563
- Time zone: UTC+7 (UTC + 7)

Züüngovi (Mongolian: Зүүнговь, east govi) is a sum (district) of Uvs Province in western Mongolia.

It lies on the southern shore of Uvs Nuur. Part of the sum is covered with sand dunes.

On 26 December 1966, Züüngovi recorded a temperature of −55.6 °C (−68.1 °F), which is the coldest temperature ever recorded in Mongolia.

== Administrative divisions ==
The district is divided into five bags, which are:

- Bayannuur
- Suvraga
- Tokhoi
- Uguumur
- Zeliin Gol
