= Tsagaankhairkhan, Uvs =

District in Uvs Province, Mongolia

Coordinates: 49°24′10″N 94°15′04″E

Tsagaankhairkhan District Цагаанхайрхан сум ᠴᠠᠭᠠᠩᠬᠠᠶᠢᠷᠬᠠᠨᠰᠤᠮᠤ
- District
- Interactive map of Tsagaankhairkhan District
- Country: Mongolia
- Province: Uvs Province
- Time zone: UTC+7 (UTC + 7)

Tsagaankhairkhan (Mongolian: Цагаанхайрхан, white mountain) is a sum (district) of Uvs Province in western Mongolia.

It is situated in the Khan Khökhii mountains, on the banks of Mondoohei River.

== Administrative divisions ==
The district is divided into four bags, which are:

- Arbulag
- Dalankhuruu
- Khulj
- Khunt
