= Türgen, Uvs =

District in Uvs Province, Mongolia

Coordinates: 50°05′55″N 91°40′25″E

Türgen District Түргэн сум ᠲᠦᠷᠭᠡᠨᠰᠤᠮᠤ
- District
- Interactive map of Türgen District
- Country: Mongolia
- Province: Uvs Province
- Time zone: UTC+7 (UTC + 7)

Türgen (Mongolian: Түргэн "Fast") is a sum (district) of Uvs Province in western Mongolia.

The center of the sum lies on the banks of the Türgen River in the valley between the Kharkhiraa and the Türgen mountains. It is about 35 km NW of Ulaangom, along the highway to the Russian border.

== Administrative divisions ==
The district is divided into three bags, which are:

- Bayankhairkhan
- Erdenekhairkhan
- Rashaant
