= Erzin, Russia =

Selo in Tuva, Russia

Erzin Эрзин
- Selo

Other transcription(s)
  - Tuvan: Эрзин
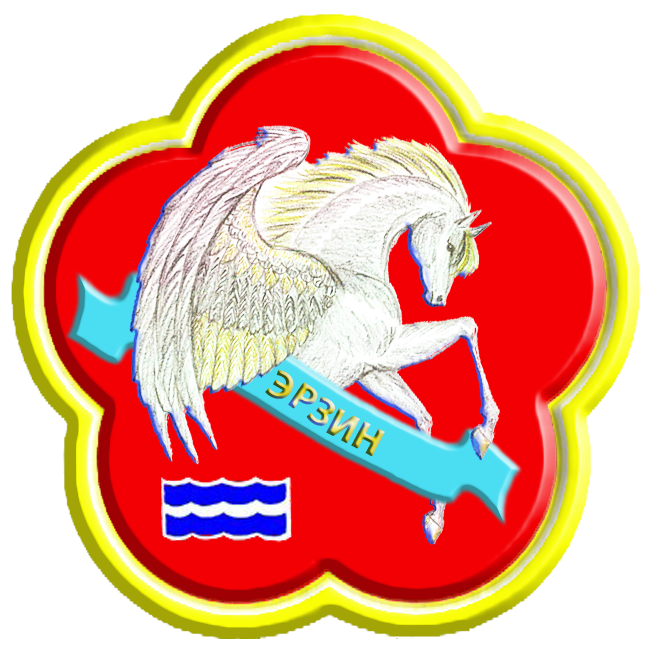
- Flag Coat of arms
- Interactive map of Erzin
- Location of Erzin Erzin (Tuva Republic)
- Coordinates: 50°15′22″N 95°09′37″E
- Country: Russia
- Federal subject: Tuva
- Administrative district: Erzinsky District
- SumonSelsoviet: Erzinsky
- Elevation: 1,104 m (3,622 ft)

Population (2010 Census)
  - Total: 3,191
  - Estimate (2021): 3,373 (+5.7%)

Administrative status
  - Capital of: Erzinsky District, Erzinsky Sumon

Municipal status
  - Municipal district: Erzinsky Municipal District
  - Rural settlement: Erzinsky Sumon Rural Settlement
  - Capital of: Erzinsky Municipal District, Erzinsky Sumon Rural Settlement
- Time zone: UTC+7 (MSK+4)
- Postal code: 668380
- OKTMO ID: 93658455101

Erzin (Russian: Эрзин; Tuvan: Эрзин) is a rural locality (a selo) and the administrative center of Erzinsky District of Tuva, Russia. Population: 3,191 (2010 census); 2,977 (2002 census); 2,707 (1989 Soviet census).

== Climate ==
Erzin has an extremely continental cold semi-arid climate (Köppen BSk), similar to Ulaangom across the border with Mongolia. The extreme temperature inversions of the Great Lakes Depression make Erzin's winters particularly severe. January temperatures are 4.5 °C or 8.1 °F colder than those of Norilsk twenty degrees further north and only 5 °C or 9 °F warmer than those of Yakutsk.

Climate data for Erzin (extremes 1949–present)
Month	Jan	Feb	Mar	Apr	May	Jun	Jul	Aug	Sep	Oct	Nov	Dec	Year
Record high °C (°F)	−7.8 (18.0)	0.4 (32.7)	15.5 (59.9)	28.2 (82.8)	33.2 (91.8)	38.9 (102.0)	42.5 (108.5)	37.4 (99.3)	32.3 (90.1)	24.0 (75.2)	13.0 (55.4)	1.2 (34.2)	42.5 (108.5)
Mean daily maximum °C (°F)	−25.1 (−13.2)	−20.0 (−4.0)	−8.0 (17.6)	9.6 (49.3)	19.1 (66.4)	25.5 (77.9)	27.1 (80.8)	24.6 (76.3)	17.9 (64.2)	8.5 (47.3)	−6.6 (20.1)	−20.2 (−4.4)	4.4 (39.9)
Daily mean °C (°F)	−31.0 (−23.8)	−27.0 (−16.6)	−15.3 (4.5)	2.5 (36.5)	11.3 (52.3)	17.7 (63.9)	19.8 (67.6)	17.1 (62.8)	10.3 (50.5)	1.4 (34.5)	−11.9 (10.6)	−25.2 (−13.4)	−2.5 (27.5)
Mean daily minimum °C (°F)	−35.4 (−31.7)	−32.5 (−26.5)	−21.5 (−6.7)	−3.2 (26.2)	4.5 (40.1)	10.8 (51.4)	13.6 (56.5)	11.0 (51.8)	4.2 (39.6)	−3.8 (25.2)	−16.2 (2.8)	−29.1 (−20.4)	−8.1 (17.4)
Record low °C (°F)	−52.3 (−62.1)	−49.3 (−56.7)	−44.9 (−48.8)	−31.8 (−25.2)	−11.6 (11.1)	−3.5 (25.7)	0.2 (32.4)	−3.1 (26.4)	−11.4 (11.5)	−24.6 (−12.3)	−44.1 (−47.4)	−50.9 (−59.6)	−52.3 (−62.1)
Average precipitation mm (inches)	4.8 (0.19)	4.6 (0.18)	5.4 (0.21)	6.6 (0.26)	10.7 (0.42)	23.5 (0.93)	46.5 (1.83)	39.4 (1.55)	17.3 (0.68)	8.1 (0.32)	10.2 (0.40)	8.8 (0.35)	185.9 (7.32)
Source: pogoda.ru.net
