= Ölgii, Uvs =

District in Uvs Province, Mongolia

Coordinates: 49.0667°N 91.5500°E

Ölgii District Өлгий сум ᠥᠯᠦᠭᠡᠢᠰᠤᠮᠤ
- District
- Interactive map of Ölgii District
- Country: Mongolia
- Province: Uvs Province

Area
  - Total: 2,702 km^{2} (1,043 sq mi)

Population
  - Total: 3,809
- Time zone: UTC+7 (Hovd Time)

Ölgii (Mongolian: Өлгий) is a sum (district) of Uvs Province in western Mongolia.

== Administrative divisions ==
The district is divided into four bags, which are:

- Chargat
- Khudulmur
- Khulst Nuur
- Ulgii Nuur
