= Türgen =

Mountain in Uvs, Mongolia

Ih Türgen Uul
- Location within Mongolia

Highest point
- Elevation: 4,029 m (13,219 ft)
- Prominence: 1,594 m (5,230 ft)
- Listing: Ultra
- Coordinates: 49°47′57″N 89°45′15″E

Geography
- Location: Mongolia
- Parent range: Altai Mountains

Türgen (Mongolian: Түргэн, lit. "swift") is a mountain range in the Altai Mountains covering 145.1 thousand hectares of which 104 square kms are covered with snow and ice year round. The range extends about 70 km through the territories of Khovd, Turgen, Buhmurun, and Sagil soums of Uvs Province of Mongolia. A number of rivers take origin in these mountains including Buural, Turgen, Harhiraa, Yamaat and Jivertey.

Its peak Deglii Tsagaan ((Mongolian: Дэглий цагаан, Heron the White) has an elevation of 4,029 metres and is snow-capped.

The mountain range is rich in biodiversity and home to rare and endangered animals and plants such as the snow leopard, argali sheep, ibex, and the saussurea involucrata.

In 1993, the area was placed under special state protection by resolution No. 83 of the Mongolian Parliament, and in 2008 its boundaries were expanded by Parliament resolution No. 05 to include the beautiful Goojuur waterfall. Within these special state protected areas, the Turgen Mountain Strictly Protected Area (nature reserve) covers a total area of 130,473 hectares.

== See also ==
- List of ultras of Central Asia
