= Por-Bazhyn =

Archaeological site in Russia

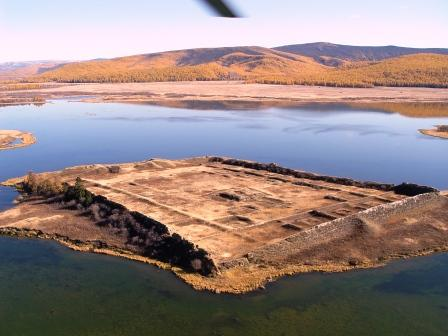
- Por-Bazhyn from the air (looking northwest) before excavation in 2007

- Location within Russia
- 50°36′54″N 97°23′5″E
- Type: Fortified settlement
- Cultures: Yugur
- Location: Tuva, Russia

History
- Built: 777AD, estimated in accordance with 774-775 carbon-14 spike event

Site notes
- Elevation: 1,300 m (4,300 ft)
- Area: 4.14 ha (10.2 acres)
- Excavation dates: 1957–63, 2007–08

Por-Bazhyn (Por-Bajin, Por-Bazhyng, Russian: Пор-Бажын, Tuvan: Пор-Бажың) is a ruined structure on a lake island high in the mountains of southern Tuva (Russian Federation). The name means "clay house" in Tuvan. Excavations suggest that it was built as a Uyghur palace in the 8th century AD, converted into a Manichaean monastery soon after, abandoned after a short occupation, and finally destroyed by an earthquake and subsequent fire. Its construction methods show that Por-Bazhyn was built within the Tang Chinese architectural tradition.

== Location and description ==
Por-Bazhyn occupies a small island in Lake Tere-Khol, about 1,300 m (4,300 ft) above sea level in the Sengelen mountains of southern Siberia. The location is 8 km (5.0 mi) west of the village of Kungurtuk in the southeast of the Republic of Tuva (Russian Federation), close to the Russian border with Mongolia.

The walls of the site enclose a rectangular area of 215 m × 162 m (705 ft × 531 ft), oriented east–west and covering almost the entire island. The interior is taken up by two large yards, a central building complex, and a chain of small yards along the northern, western and southern walls. The western and eastern curtain walls are relatively well preserved. The main gate, with gate towers and ramps leading up to them, is located in the middle of the eastern wall. The curtain (outer) walls have survived up to a maximum height of 10 m (33 ft), the maximum surviving height of the inner walls is 1–1.5 m (3.3–4.9 ft).

== History of research and identifications ==
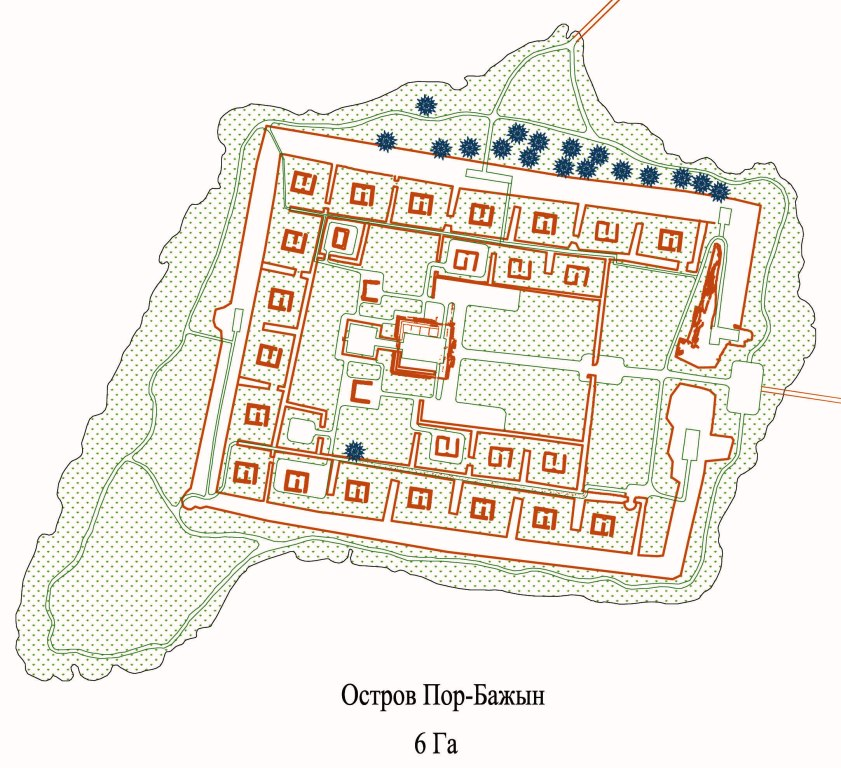
Vajnstejn's plan of the site (updated 2007 for the Por-Bajin Fortress Foundation)

Por-Bazhyn has been known since the 18th century, and was explored in 1891 for the first time. In 1957–1963, the Russian archaeologist S.I. Vajnstejn excavated in several areas of the site. Large-scale fieldwork was undertaken in 2007–2008 by the Fortress Por-Bajin Foundation, with scholars and scientists from the Russian Academy of Sciences, the State Oriental Museum, and Moscow State University.

Since the end of the 19th century, Por-Bazhyn has been linked to the Uyghurs because of its location, the date of finds from it, and the similarity of its lay-out to the palace complex of Karabalgasun, the capital of the Uyghur Khaganate. Vajnstejn identified Por-Bazhyn as the ‘palace .. at the well’ built, according to the runic inscription on the Selenga stone, by Khagan Moyanchur (also known as Bayanchur Khan, AD 747-759), after his victory over local tribes in AD 750. Moyanchur involved the Uyghur Khaganate in internal power struggles in China, and married a Chinese princess. Other identifications of the site included a border fortress, a monastery, a ritual site, and an astronomical observatory; these are found in older literature published before the conclusion of modern fieldwork in 2008.

== Results of fieldwork 2007–2008 ==
Geophysicists found that the island is essentially a plug of permafrost in a shallow lake. This island seems to have risen from the lake several centuries before the fortress was built on it. The clay for the walls of the fortress may have been taken from the lake bed around the island. Geomorphological fieldwork also revealed traces of at least two earthquakes. The first of these seems to have already happened during the construction of the fortress in the 8th century. In the late Middle Ages, another catastrophic earthquake led to fires and to the collapse of the southern and eastern enclosure walls and of the northwestern corner bastion.

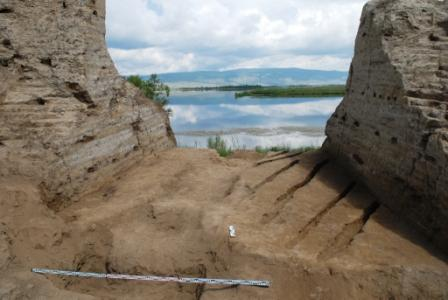
Excavation trench in 2007/8 through the northern curtain wall of Por-Bazhyn, showing hangtu in section

The outer wall of the enclosure was built using the Chinese hangtu technique (rammed-earth layers in a wooden frame) and was originally 11 m (36 ft) high. The excavation of the northern bastion on the eastern wall revealed traces of a wooden fighting platform running along the top of the curtain wall and bastions. The main gate was found to have three gateways of heavy timber construction, much of it burnt. It opened into two successive courtyards which were connected by a small gate. The outer courtyard was devoid of all structures.

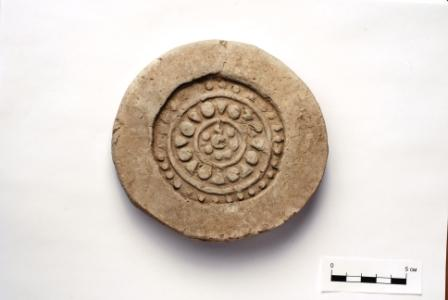
Finial for roof tiles in Chinese style, found at Por-Bazhyn during excavations in 2007 (scale: cm)

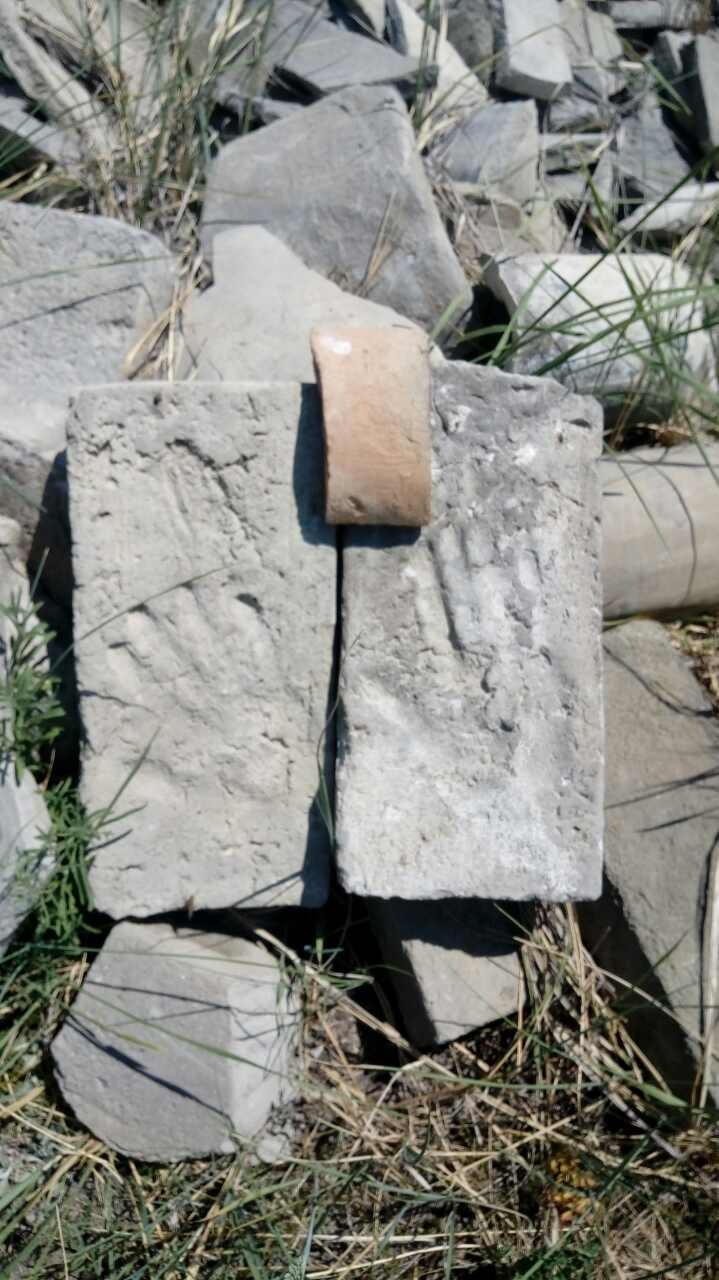
Ancient tile among the ruins of the fortress of Por-Bazhyn

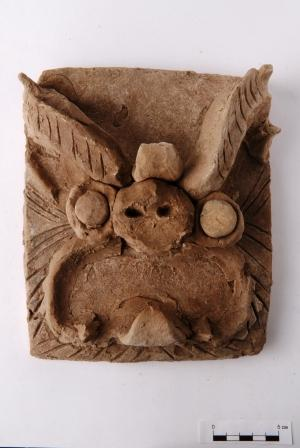
Tile with apotropaic dragon image in the Chinese style, found during excavations 2007 at Por-Bazhyn (scale: cm)

The inner courtyard held the main complex which consisted of a two-part central structure and two flanking galleries. The two buildings of the central structure, one behind the other, stood on square platforms which had been built up of clay layers and faced with bricks which were coated with lime plaster. The larger building was subdivided by wattle-and-daub panels into two halls and a series of smaller rooms. Walls and panels were covered with lime plaster which was painted with geometric designs and horizontal red stripes; the presence of two layers of plaster of different quality suggests repairs. The tiled roof had been supported by 36 wooden columns resting on stone bases. The building appeared to be of post-and-beam construction characteristic of Chinese Tang architecture; this is indicated by burnt timber fragments of interlocking wooden brackets in the Chinese style called dougong. The decorative eave end-tiles recovered from the site are broadly analogous to those found in Tang contexts, however recent studies indicate they form part of a distinctive Uyghur stylistic typology.

A series of small enclosed courtyards ran along the interior of the northern, western and southern curtain walls; these courtyards were connected to one another by small gates in their walls. Each courtyard held a one- or two-chamber building of similar lay-out and building method.

== Dating and interpretation of the site ==
Early dendrochronology and radiocarbon dating studies indicated that the ‘fortress’ was built between AD 770 and 790. The excavators point out that this was in the reign of Uyghur Bögü Qaghan, successor of Moyanchur, therefore Por-Bazhyn cannot have been the palace mentioned in the Selenga inscription. The date of the palace's construction was later refined further to around AD 777.

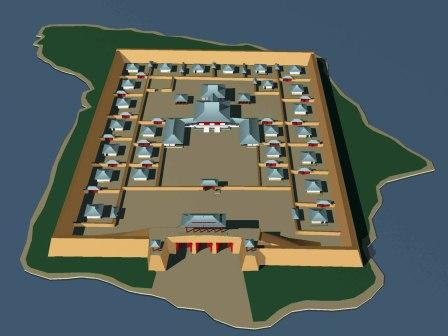
3-D reconstruction drawing of Por-Bazhyn based on excavation results 2007/8 (by R.A. Vafeev)

A Chinese presence or influence at Por-Bazhyn is shown by the lay-out of the central complex in Tang style; the use of Chinese construction methods, such as the hangtu technique and dougong ceilings; and the presence of Chinese building materials, such as certain types of roof tiles. Por-Bazhyn combines the lay-out of the Chinese ‘ideal town’, with axial planning and a dominant central building, with that of the ‘ideal Buddhist monastery’, with living quarters along the inner perimeter of the enclosure walls.

Using the latest update of the palace being built in 777, the excavators suggest that this was a summer palace built by Khagan Bögü which, after damage to the palace by an earthquake and the Khagan's conversion to Manichaeism, was converted into a Manichaean monastery. Following his death in 780 and the abolition of Manichaeism afterwards, the monastery was abandoned. The empty site was later destroyed by one or more earthquakes and extensive fires in the central complex and elsewhere on the site.

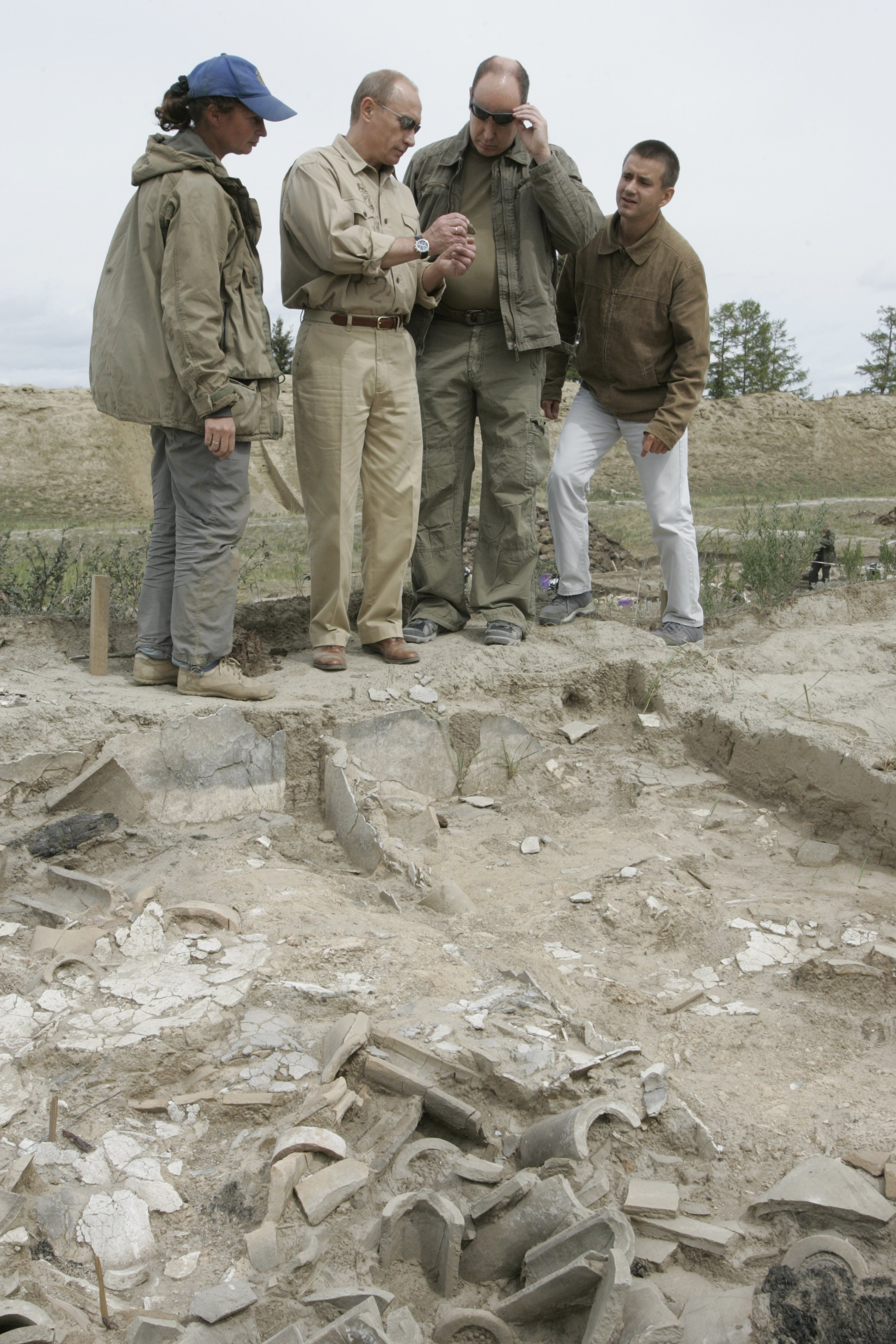
Vladimir Putin (middle) and Prince Albert (right) at Por-Bazhyn

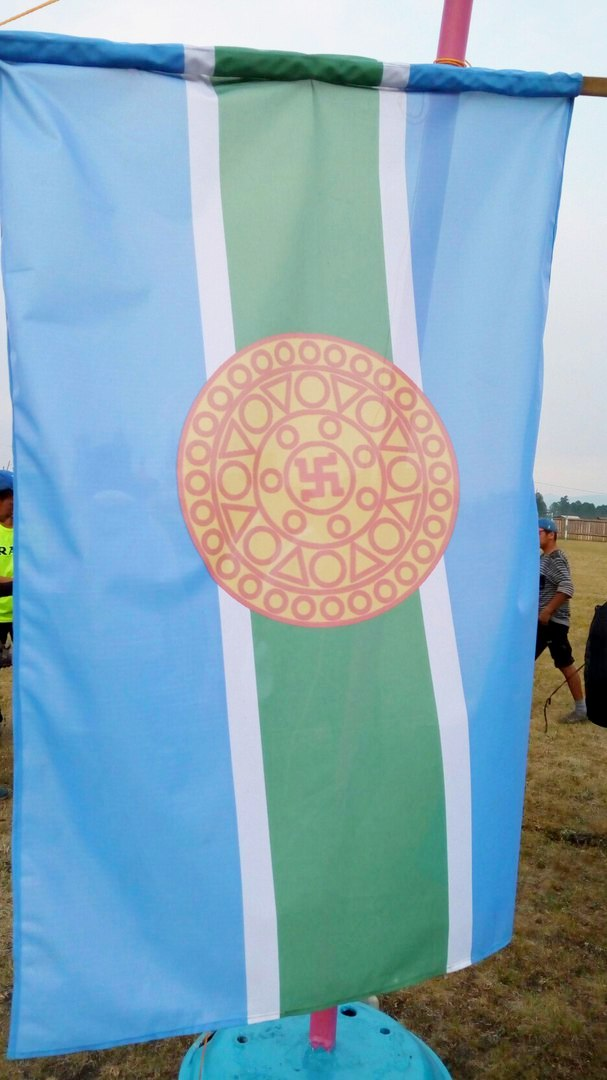
Current flag of the Tere-Khol district, Tyva. Heraldic images of ancient coins found in excavations in Por-Bazhyn

== Modern significance of Por-Bazhyn ==
The fieldwork at Por-Bazhyn in 2007 and 2008 was followed with great interest in Uyghur media, and a delegation of the Uyghur Cultural Centre (Kazakhstan) visited the site during the excavations in 2007. Being without a national state of their own today, the modern Uyghurs derive an essential element of their cultural identity from the past greatness of the Uyghur Khaganate.

The native Tuvinian Sergey Shoygu, then Minister for Emergencies of the Russian Federation, was chairman of the Por-Bazhyn Fortress Foundation which provided the funding for the fieldwork. In August 2007, he visited the excavations together with Vladimir Putin, then Prime Minister of the Russian Federation, and Albert II, Prince of Monaco.
