= Erzinsky District =

Erzinsky District Эрзинский кожуун (Russian)
- District

Other transcription(s)
  - Tuvan: Эрзин кожуун
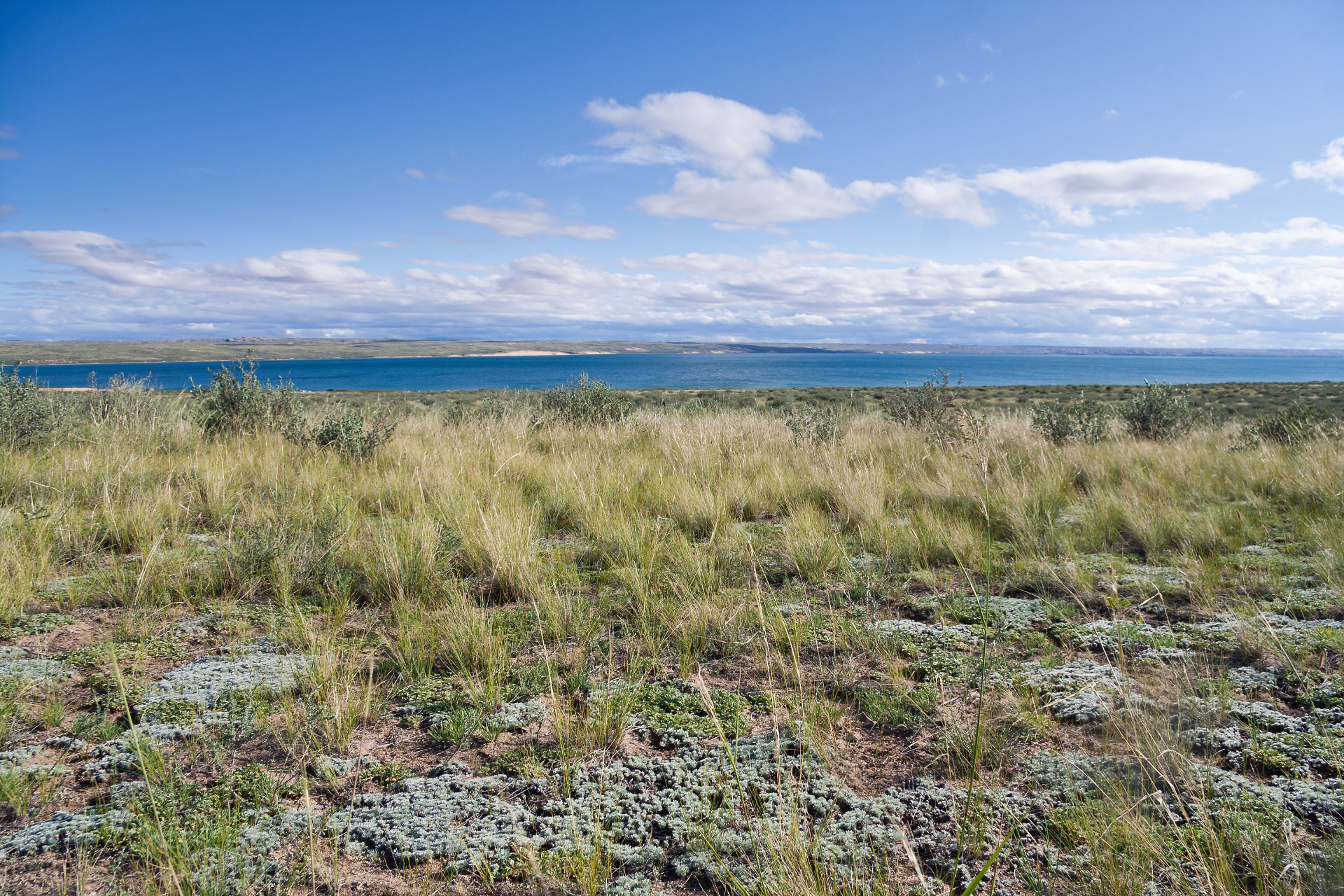
- Lake Tore-Khol, a protected area of Russia in Erzinsky District

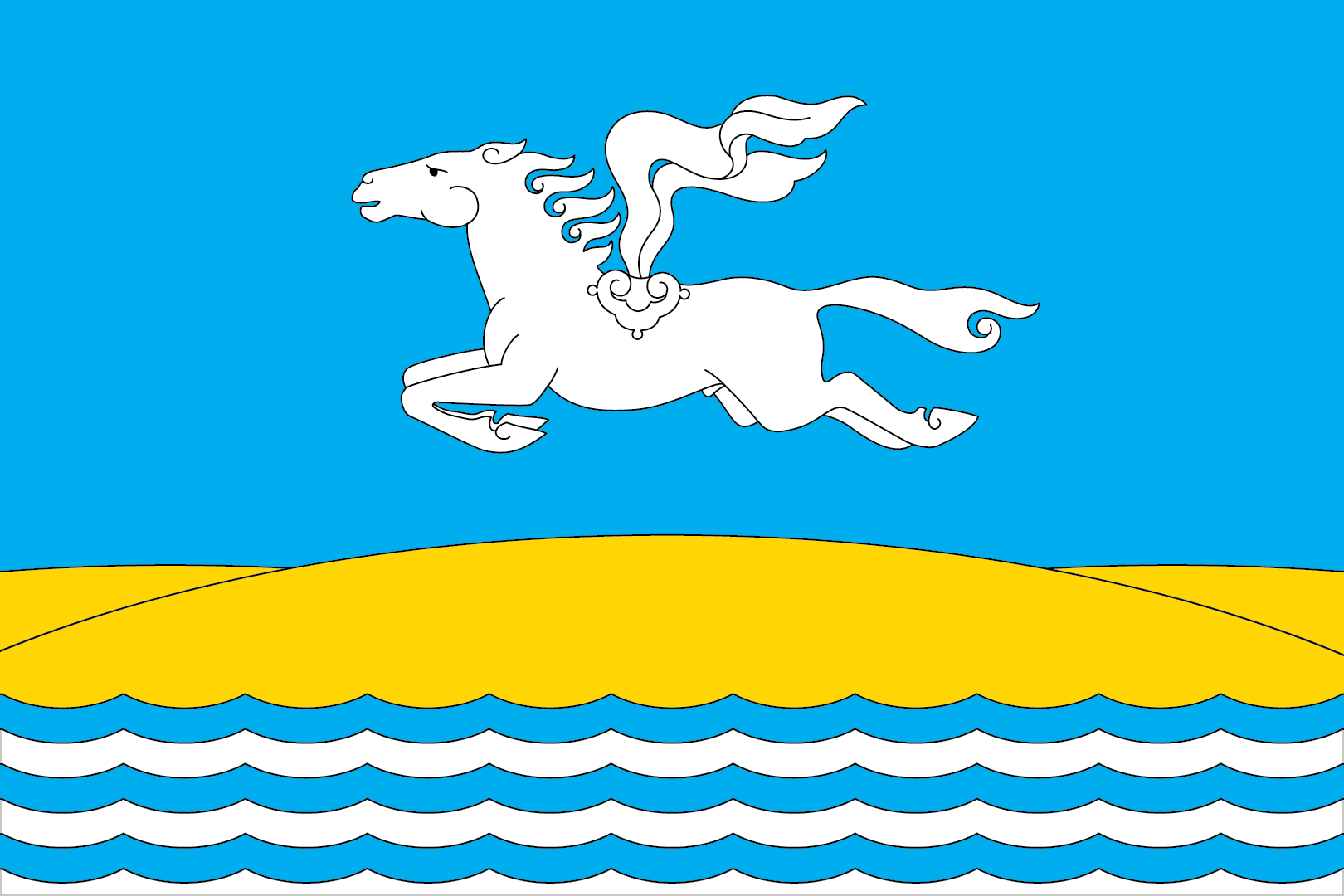
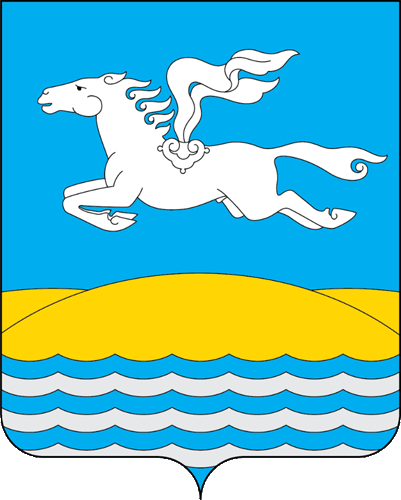
- Flag Coat of arms
- Location of Erzinsky District in the Tuva Republic
- Coordinates: 50°10′N 93°49′E
- Country: Russia
- Federal subject: Tuva Republic
- Established: July 28, 1941 (first), January 12, 1965 (second)
- Administrative center: Erzin

Area
  - Total: 11,081.45 km^{2} (4,278.57 sq mi)

Population (2010 Census)
  - Total: 8,280
  - Density: 0.747/km^{2} (1.94/sq mi)
  - Urban: 0%
  - Rural: 100%

Administrative structure
  - Administrative divisions: 6 Sumons
  - Inhabited localities: 6 rural localities

Municipal structure
  - Municipally incorporated as: Erzinsky Municipal District
  - Municipal divisions: 0 urban settlements, 6 rural settlements
- Time zone: UTC+7 (MSK+4)
- OKTMO ID: 93658000
- Website: http://erzin.rtyva.ru

Population of Erzinsky District
- 2010 Census: 8,280
- 2002 Census: 8,081
- 1989 Census: 8,633
- 1979 Census: 7,483

Erzinsky District (Russian: Эрзинский кожуун; Tuvan: Эрзин кожуун, Erzin kojuun) is an administrative and municipal district (raion, or kozhuun), one of the seventeen in the Tuva Republic, Russia. It is located in the south and southeast of the republic. The area of the district is 11,081.45 square kilometers (4,278.57 sq mi). Its administrative center is the rural locality (a selo) of Erzin. As of the 2010 Census, the total population of the district was 8,280, with the population of Erzin accounting for 38.5% of that number.

== History ==
The district was first established on July 28, 1941. On January 7, 1963, it was abolished and merged into Tes-Khemsky District. Erzinsky District was re-established on January 12, 1965.
