= Ömnögovi, Uvs =

District in Uvs Province, Mongolia

Ömnögovi District Өмнөговь сум ᠡᠮᠦᠨᠡᠭᠣᠪᠢᠰᠤᠮᠤ
- District
- Location within Mongolia
- Coordinates: 49°6′23″N 91°43′7″E
- Country: Mongolia
- Province: Uvs Province

Area
  - Total: 3,118 km^{2} (1,204 sq mi)
- Time zone: UTC+7 (UTC + 7)

Ömnögovi (Mongolian: Өмнөговь, romanized: Ömnögowĭ) is a sum (district) of Uvs Province in western Mongolia.

Part of the sum is desert, that has sand dunes.

== Climate ==
Ömnögovi has a semi-arid climate (Köppen climate classification BSk) with warm summers and severely cold winters. The average minimum temperature in January is −28.3 °C (−18.9 °F), and temperatures as low as −45.5 °C (−49.9 °F) have been recorded. Most precipitation falls in the summer as rain, with some snow in the adjacent months of May and September. Winters are very dry.

Climate data for Ömnögovi
Month	Jan	Feb	Mar	Apr	May	Jun	Jul	Aug	Sep	Oct	Nov	Dec	Year
Record high °C (°F)	3.2 (37.8)	8.2 (46.8)	17.5 (63.5)	24.3 (75.7)	28.3 (82.9)	31.3 (88.3)	33.6 (92.5)	38.9 (102.0)	29.7 (85.5)	24.4 (75.9)	11.9 (53.4)	9.2 (48.6)	38.9 (102.0)
Mean daily maximum °C (°F)	−15.2 (4.6)	−11.1 (12.0)	−0.4 (31.3)	8.6 (47.5)	16.7 (62.1)	21.6 (70.9)	22.5 (72.5)	21.0 (69.8)	15.3 (59.5)	6.9 (44.4)	−3.8 (25.2)	−13.1 (8.4)	5.8 (42.3)
Daily mean °C (°F)	−22.6 (−8.7)	−19.5 (−3.1)	−8.6 (16.5)	1.0 (33.8)	9.5 (49.1)	15.0 (59.0)	16.2 (61.2)	14.2 (57.6)	7.9 (46.2)	−0.6 (30.9)	−10.9 (12.4)	−20.3 (−4.5)	−1.6 (29.2)
Mean daily minimum °C (°F)	−28.4 (−19.1)	−26.0 (−14.8)	−16.0 (3.2)	−6.1 (21.0)	2.2 (36.0)	8.2 (46.8)	10.5 (50.9)	8.2 (46.8)	1.2 (34.2)	−6.3 (20.7)	−16.4 (2.5)	−25.1 (−13.2)	−7.8 (17.9)
Record low °C (°F)	−45.5 (−49.9)	−42.3 (−44.1)	−35.6 (−32.1)	−23.1 (−9.6)	−16.9 (1.6)	−3.0 (26.6)	1.5 (34.7)	−1.8 (28.8)	−18.5 (−1.3)	−22.0 (−7.6)	−31.8 (−25.2)	−42.8 (−45.0)	−45.5 (−49.9)
Average precipitation mm (inches)	0.7 (0.03)	0.5 (0.02)	1.9 (0.07)	4.3 (0.17)	6.8 (0.27)	24.9 (0.98)	44.6 (1.76)	27.0 (1.06)	12.2 (0.48)	3.0 (0.12)	1.3 (0.05)	1.4 (0.06)	128.6 (5.07)
Average precipitation days (≥ 1.0 mm)	0.1	0.3	0.6	1.0	1.6	4.3	4.2	4.5	2.1	0.5	0.3	0.5	20
Source: NOAA (1963-1990)

== Administrative divisions ==
The district is divided into five bags, which are:

- Bayangol
- Kholboo
- Namir
- Orlogo
- Uliast
