= Mongun-Tayginsky District =

Mongun-Tayginsky District Монгун-Тайгинский кожуун (Russian)
- District
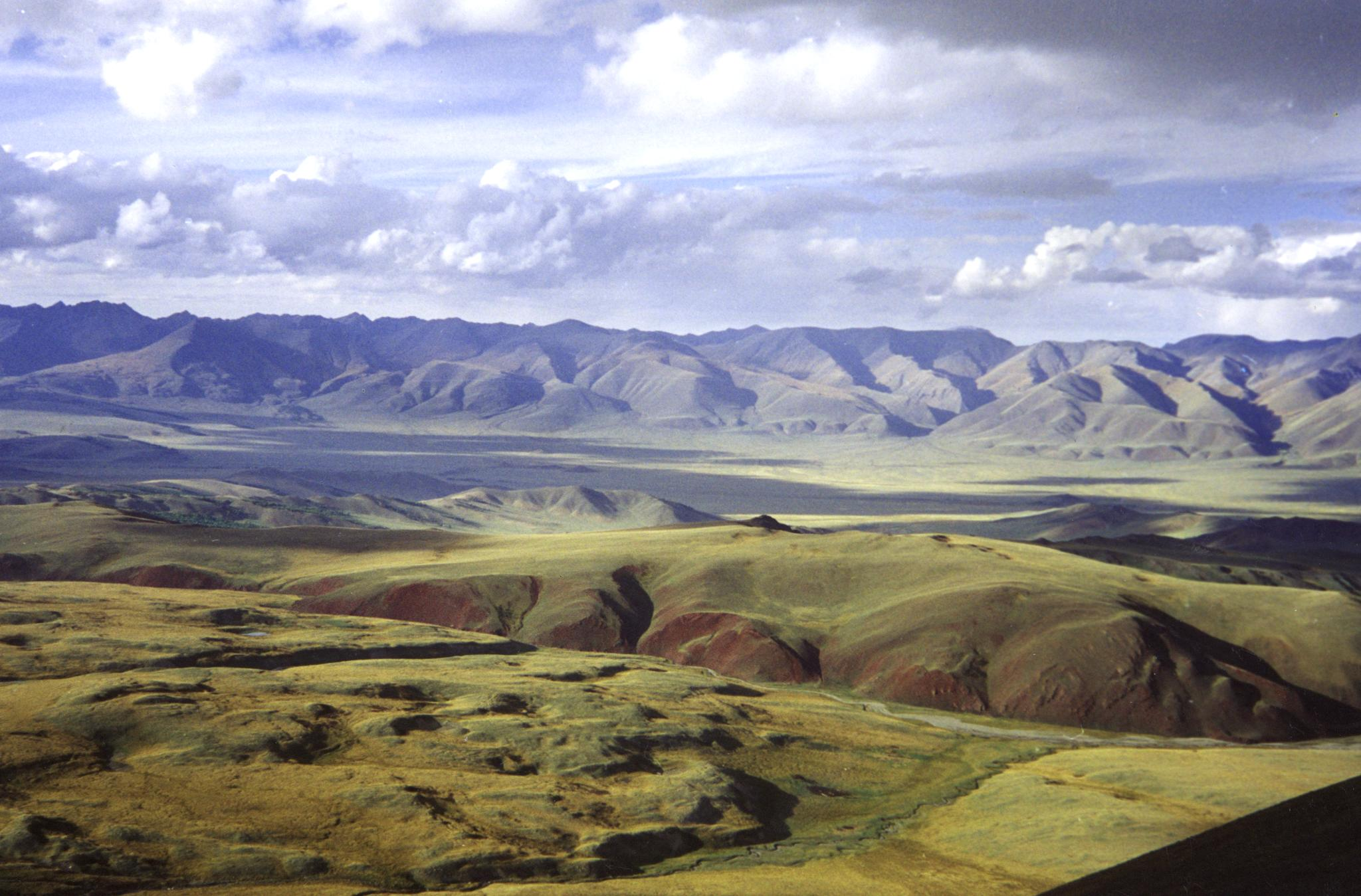
- Ubsunur, in the District

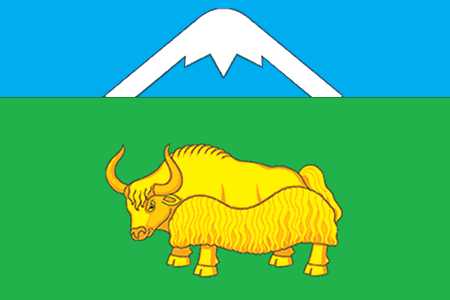
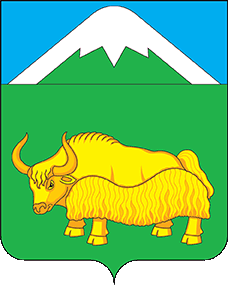
- Flag Coat of arms
- Location of Mogun-Tayginsky District in the Tuva Republic
- Coordinates: 50.312°N 90.121°E
- Country: Russia
- Federal subject: Tuva Republic
- Administrative center: Mugur-Aksy

Area
  - Total: 4,414.20 km^{2} (1,704.33 sq mi)

Population (2010 Census)
  - Total: 5,661
  - Density: 1.282/km^{2} (3.322/sq mi)
  - Urban: 0%
  - Rural: 100%

Administrative structure
  - Administrative divisions: 3 sumon
  - Inhabited localities: 3 rural localities

Municipal structure
  - Municipally incorporated as: Mongun-Tayginsky Municipal District
  - Municipal divisions: 0 urban settlements, 3 rural settlements
- Time zone: UTC+7 (MSK+4)
- OKTMO ID: 93625000
- Website: http://mongun-taiga.rtyva.ru/

Mongun-Tayginsky District (Russian: Монгу́н-Тайги́нский кожуун; Tuvan: Мөңгүн-Тайга кожуун, Möñgün-Tayga kojuun) is an administrative and municipal district (raion, or kozhuun), one of the seventeen in the Tuva Republic, Russia. It is located in the southwest of the republic. Its administrative center is the rural locality (a selo) of Mugur-Aksy. Population: 5,661 (2010 census); 5,938 (2002 Census); 5,576 (1989 Soviet census). The population of Mugur-Aksy accounts for 73.4% of the district's total population.
