= Khan Khökhii =

Mountain in Uvs Province, Mongolia

- Location within Mongolia

Highest point
- Elevation: 2,928 m (9,606 ft)
- Prominence: 1,133 m (3,717 ft)
- Listing: Ribu
- Coordinates: 49°22′40″N 94°41′18″E

Geography
- Location: Mongolia

Khan Khökhii (Mongolian: Хан хөхий, romanized: Han höhii, pronounced [χaŋ‿xɵˈçi]) is a mountain of the Uvs Province in Mongolia. It has an elevation of 2,928 metres (9,606 ft).
