= Uvs Province =

Province in north-western Mongolia

Uvs Province Увс аймаг (Mongolian) Увс әәмг (Oirat) ᠤᠪᠰᠤ ᠠᠢᠮᠠᠭ
- Province
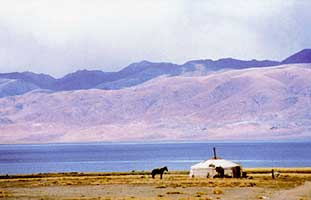
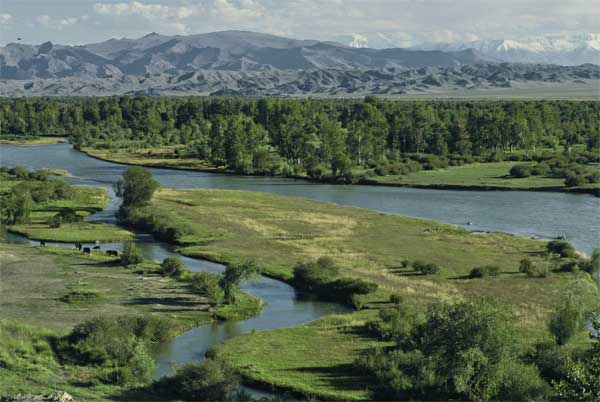
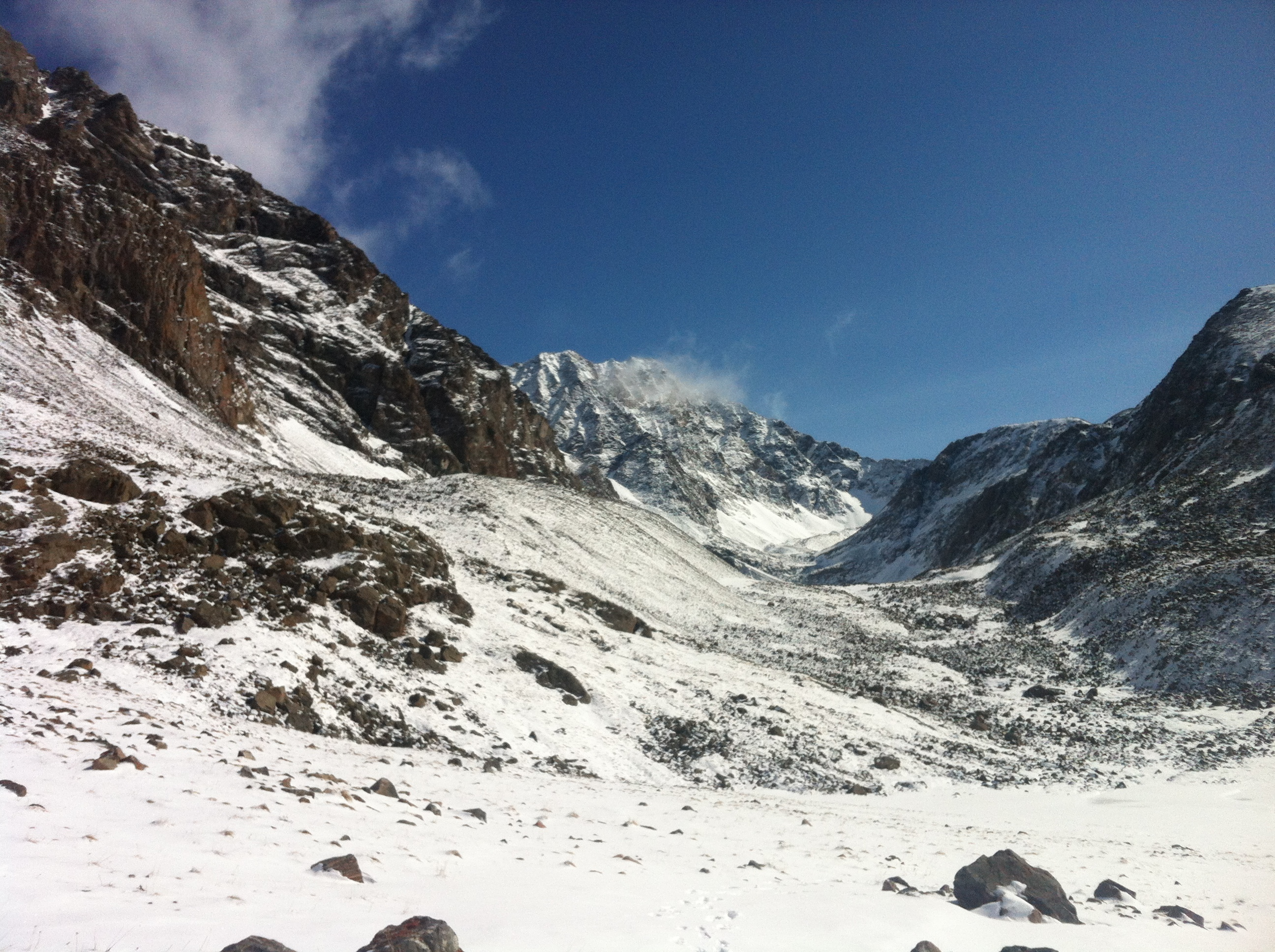
- Uvs Lake Khovd River Türgen Mountain Range

- Flag Coat of arms

- Location of Uvs in Mongolia
- Coordinates: 49°30′N 92°30′E
- Country: Mongolia
- Established: 1931
- Capital: Ulaangom

Government
  - Body: Citizens' Representatives Khural of Uvs Province

Area
  - Total: 69,585.39 km^{2} (26,867.07 sq mi)

Population (2025)
  - Total: 84,140
  - Density: 1.209/km^{2} (3.132/sq mi)

GDP
  - Total: MNT 694 billion US$ 0.2 billion (2022)
  - Per capita: MNT 8,130,020; US$ 2,603 (2022)
- Time zone: UTC+7
- Area code: +976 (0)145
- ISO 3166 code: MN-046
- Vehicle registration: УВ_
- Website: uvs.gov.mn

Uvs Province (/ˈʊfs/ UUFS) (Note: Mongolian: Увс аймаг, romanized: Ubhs aimag, IPA: [ʊɸs ˈæe̯mə̆q]; Oirat: Увс әәмг, romanized: Uws äämg, pronounced [ʊɸs‿ˈɛːmə̆q]) is one of the 21 aimags (provinces) of Mongolia. It is located in the west of the country, 1,336 kilometres or 830 miles away from the national capital, Ulaanbaatar. Its capital is Ulaangom, which lies 936 metres or 3,070 feet above sea level.

The province is named after Mongolia's biggest lake, Uvs Lake.

== Geography ==
Parts of the steppe in this province are protected as the World Heritage Site Uvs Lake Basin. In the north the province borders Russia for 640 kilometres or 400 miles, whilst in the east 340 kilometres or 210 miles of border lies between Uvs and Zavkhan province. In the south and west it borders for 200 kilometres or 120 miles each of Khovd and Bayan-Ölgii provinces for. The province occupies 4.45 percent of the national territory, totalling 69,585 square kilometres or 26,867 square miles. Of the total area of the province, sixty percent belongs to the mountainous climatic zone, and forty percent to the Gobi semi-desert.

== Population ==
Mongols and their proto-peoples have lived in the province since antiquity. Currently, 42.3% of population is Dörbet, 34.2% is Bayid and 13.6% is Khalkha. Also, there are many Tuvans, Khotons, and Kazakhs living in this province.

At the end of 2014, 20,719 households were residing in this province. 7,476 lived in the provincial center Ulaangom, 4,105 lived in sum centers, and 9,138 lived in the countryside as herding families.

== History ==
After the Mongolian Revolution of 1921, the government founded the Jewel Mountain Province (Mongolian: Чандмань уулын аймаг, romanized: Chandmani uuliin aimag, pronounced [ˈt͡ɕʰantmæɲ ˈʊːɮiŋ ˈæˑməq]). This province included the whole western part of the country. In 1931 it was split into the Khovd and Dörvöd aimags—the latter which was renamed Uvs aimag in 1933.

== Administrative subdivisions ==
Uvs province is divided into 19 sums, lower administrative division units.

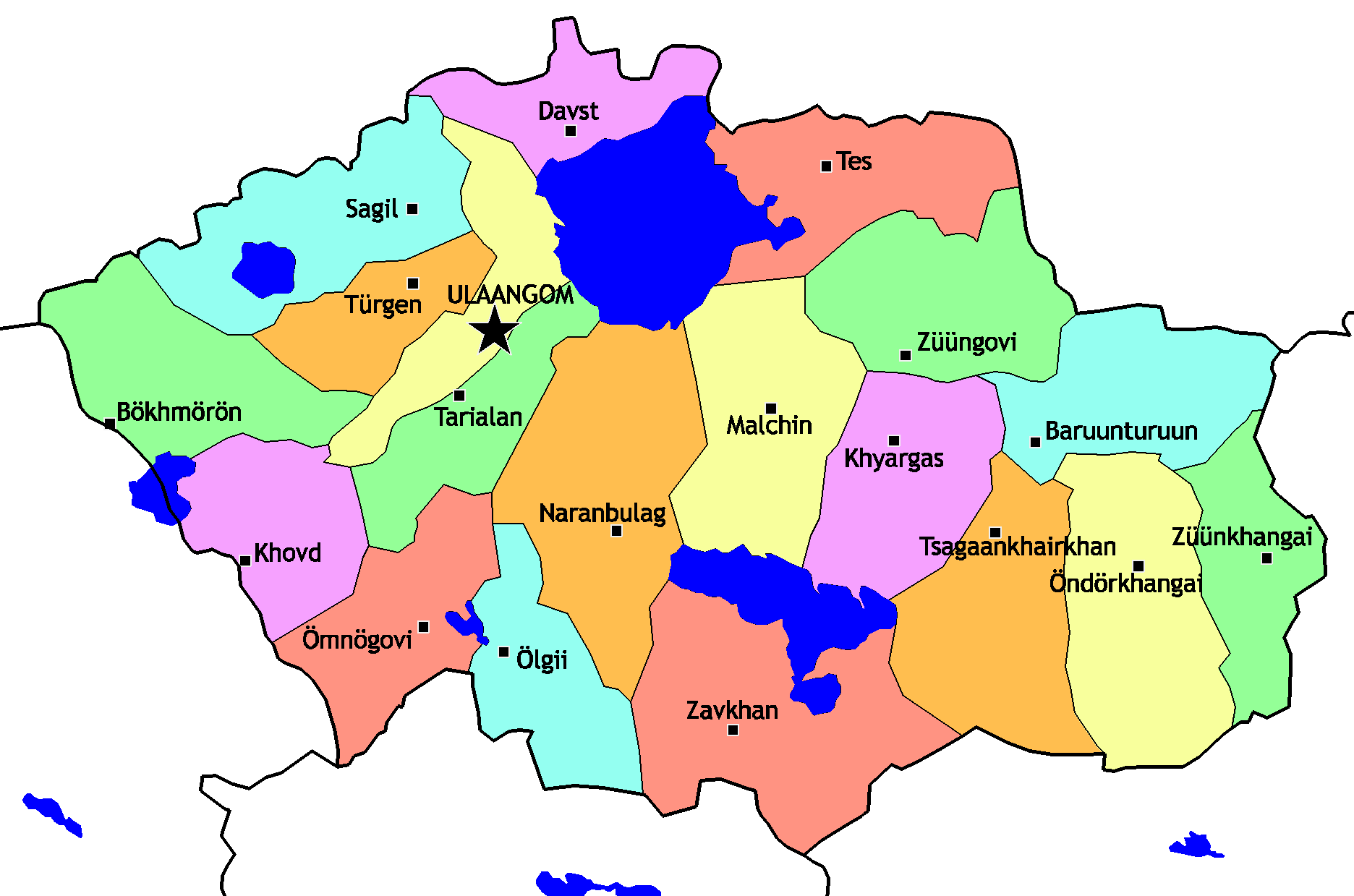
Sums of Uvs

The sums of Uvs Aimag
Sum	Mongolian	Population 2003	Population 2014
Baruunturuun	Баруунтуруун	3,241	2 449
Bökhmörön	Бөхмөрөн	2,261	2 093
Davst	Давст	1,854	1 570
Khovd	Ховд	2,463	2 237
Khyargas	Хяргас	2,491	2 314
Malchin	Малчин	2,938	2 351
Naranbulag	Наранбулаг	4,881	4 021
Ölgii	Өлгий	2,629	2 147
Ömnögovi	Өмнөговь	4,335	4 192
Öndörkhangai	Өндөрхангай	3,588	3 031
Sagil	Сагил	2,245	2 201
Tarialan	Тариалан	5,137	3 714
Tes	Тэс	6,014	5 056
Tsagaankhairkhan	Цагаанхайрхан	2,598	2 011
Türgen	Түргэн	1,867	2 018
Ulaangom^{[1]}	Улаангом	26,940	27 849
Zavkhan	Завхан	2,261	1 734
Züüngovi	Зүүнговь	2,644	2 640
Züünkhangai	Зүүнхангай	2,725	2 104
Total		87 592	75 737

^1 Ulaangom is the Uvs province center.

== Livestock ==
Year	Total	Camels	Horses	Cows	Sheep	Goats
2000	1,579,318	18,235	74,852	105,737	858,613	521,881
2010	1,619,312	14,519	59,718	84,378	776,925	683,772
2014	2,561,315	19,511	88,408	145,440	1,260,522	1,047,434

Source: National Statistical Office of Mongolia

== Economy ==
In 2018, the province contributed to 1.20% of the total national GDP of Mongolia.

== Notable people ==
- Yumjaagiin Tsedenbal, leader of Mongolia from 1952 to 1984
