= Ulaangom =

District and provincial capital of Uvs Province, Mongolia

Ulaangom Улаангом (Mongolian) Уланһом (Oirat) ᠤᠯᠠᠭᠠᠨ ᠭᠣᠮ
- District
- Ulaangom District; Уланһом сум ᠤᠯᠠᠭᠠᠨ ᠭᠣᠮᠰᠤᠮᠤ

Official Cyrillic transcription(s)
  - Mongolian Cyrillic: Улаангом сум

Classical Mongolian transcription(s)
  - Mongolian script: ᠤᠯᠠᠭᠠᠨ ᠭᠣᠮᠰᠤᠮᠤ
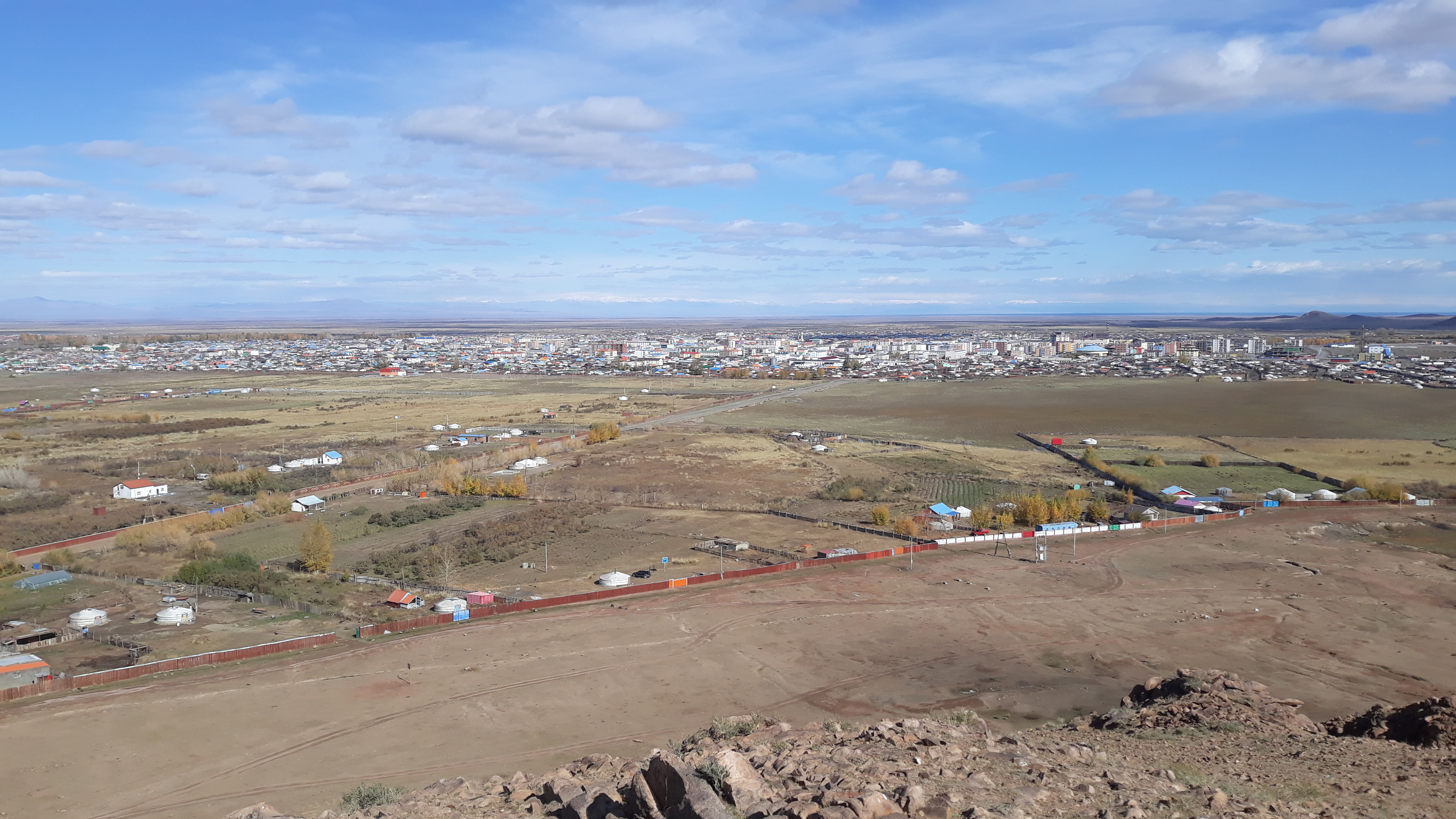
- Panoramic view of Ulaangom in 2020

- Location in Mongolia
- Coordinates: 49°59′11″N 92°04′19″E
- Country: Mongolia
- Province: Uvs Province
- Founded: 1686

Area
  - Urban: 46 km^{2} (18 sq mi)
- Elevation: 939 m (3,081 ft)

Population (2024)
  - District: 39,045
- Time zone: UTC+07:00 (HOVT)

Ulaangom (/ʊˈlɑːnɡəm/; Mongolian: Улаангом [ʊˈɮaˑɴɢɜm]; Oirat: Уланһом [ʊˈlaŋɣɔm]; "red valley") is the capital of Uvs Province in Mongolia. It is located on the slopes of the Kharkhiraa mountain, 26 kilometres (16 mi) southwest from Uvs Lake shore and 120 kilometres or 70 miles south from the Russian border.

== Description ==
The city has a population of 37,754 (2022 census), 26,319 (2000 census), 23,000 (2006 est.), 22,300 (end of 2008 est.) or 37.8% of the total population of Uvs aimag. It is divided into two suburban areas named Chandmani (Чандмань) and Uliasny Khev (Улиасны Хэв).

A Consulate of Tuva Republic of Russia is located in Ulaangom, and a Representative Office of Uvs Province in Kyzyl, the capital of Tuva.

== History ==
Ulaangom is believed to have been founded in 1686. The foundation of the Ulaangom Monastery was erected in 1871 as Dechinravjaa Monastery. Historical evidence indicates that there were grain plantations in operation in late 17th century in the area of Ulaangom.

== Climate ==
Ulaangom experiences an extremely continental cold semi-arid climate (Köppen BSk) with long, dry, frigid winters and short, warm summers. Precipitation is very low, with an annual average of 130 millimetres or 5.12 inches. Owing to its location in a deep valley near the center of the Siberian High, Ulaangom is subject to temperature inversions reaching up to 13.0 °C or 23.4 °F colder than middle and upper mountain slopes. It is thus one of the coldest places in Mongolia despite lying at a lower altitude than most of the country. Temperatures can reach −45 °C (−49 °F) or lower in the winter and 35 °C (95 °F) or more in the summer.

Climate data for Ulaangom, elevation 939 m (3,081 ft), (1991–2020 normals, extremes 1990–2023)
Month	Jan	Feb	Mar	Apr	May	Jun	Jul	Aug	Sep	Oct	Nov	Dec	Year
Record high °C (°F)	−2.2 (28.0)	−4.6 (23.7)	13.4 (56.1)	28.0 (82.4)	35.9 (96.6)	36.5 (97.7)	38.2 (100.8)	38.4 (101.1)	30.8 (87.4)	24.6 (76.3)	15.9 (60.6)	7.1 (44.8)	38.4 (101.1)
Mean daily maximum °C (°F)	−25.6 (−14.1)	−20.9 (−5.6)	−9.0 (15.8)	9.6 (49.3)	19.5 (67.1)	25.8 (78.4)	27.1 (80.8)	24.8 (76.6)	17.9 (64.2)	8.4 (47.1)	−4.5 (23.9)	−19.0 (−2.2)	4.5 (40.1)
Daily mean °C (°F)	−31.4 (−24.5)	−28.0 (−18.4)	−15.9 (3.4)	2.9 (37.2)	12.1 (53.8)	18.6 (65.5)	20.6 (69.1)	17.7 (63.9)	10.5 (50.9)	1.7 (35.1)	−8.7 (16.3)	−23.4 (−10.1)	−1.9 (28.5)
Mean daily minimum °C (°F)	−36.4 (−33.5)	−33.9 (−29.0)	−22.1 (−7.8)	−2.8 (27.0)	4.2 (39.6)	10.6 (51.1)	13.5 (56.3)	10.5 (50.9)	3.9 (39.0)	−4.0 (24.8)	−13.1 (8.4)	−28.5 (−19.3)	−8.2 (17.3)
Record low °C (°F)	−49.6 (−57.3)	−47.7 (−53.9)	−41.7 (−43.1)	−24.7 (−12.5)	−8.3 (17.1)	−3.1 (26.4)	1.7 (35.1)	−6.3 (20.7)	−8.7 (16.3)	−22.5 (−8.5)	−35.3 (−31.5)	−45.2 (−49.4)	−49.6 (−57.3)
Average precipitation mm (inches)	2.2 (0.09)	2.9 (0.11)	4.4 (0.17)	4.4 (0.17)	7.8 (0.31)	19.2 (0.76)	39.9 (1.57)	29.0 (1.14)	10.8 (0.43)	6.9 (0.27)	9.2 (0.36)	5.8 (0.23)	142.6 (5.61)
Average precipitation days (≥ 1.0 mm)	1.4	1.3	2.0	1.6	1.8	4.3	6.5	5.7	2.6	2.3	3.4	2.4	35.3
Average relative humidity (%)	70.4	71.7	76.5	56.2	40.7	45.6	52.2	55.9	56.3	64.6	77.0	75.2	61.9
Mean monthly sunshine hours	117.7	152.3	214.0	247.0	302.8	306.3	292.1	287.9	252.4	196.0	78.0	70.8	2,517.3
Source 1: NOAAStarlings Roost Weather
Source 2: Meteo Climat (record highs and lows)

== Culture ==
The city has monuments from the communist era, such as a monument of Yumjaagiin Tsedenbal, who was born in Uvs aimag and led the country for more than 40 years, in front of the Provincial Government Building. There are many educational and cultural organizations and institutions in the city. There is a branch of a university, a vocational college and 5 secondary schools.

== Tourist attractions ==
- Museum of Uvs Province

== Transportation ==
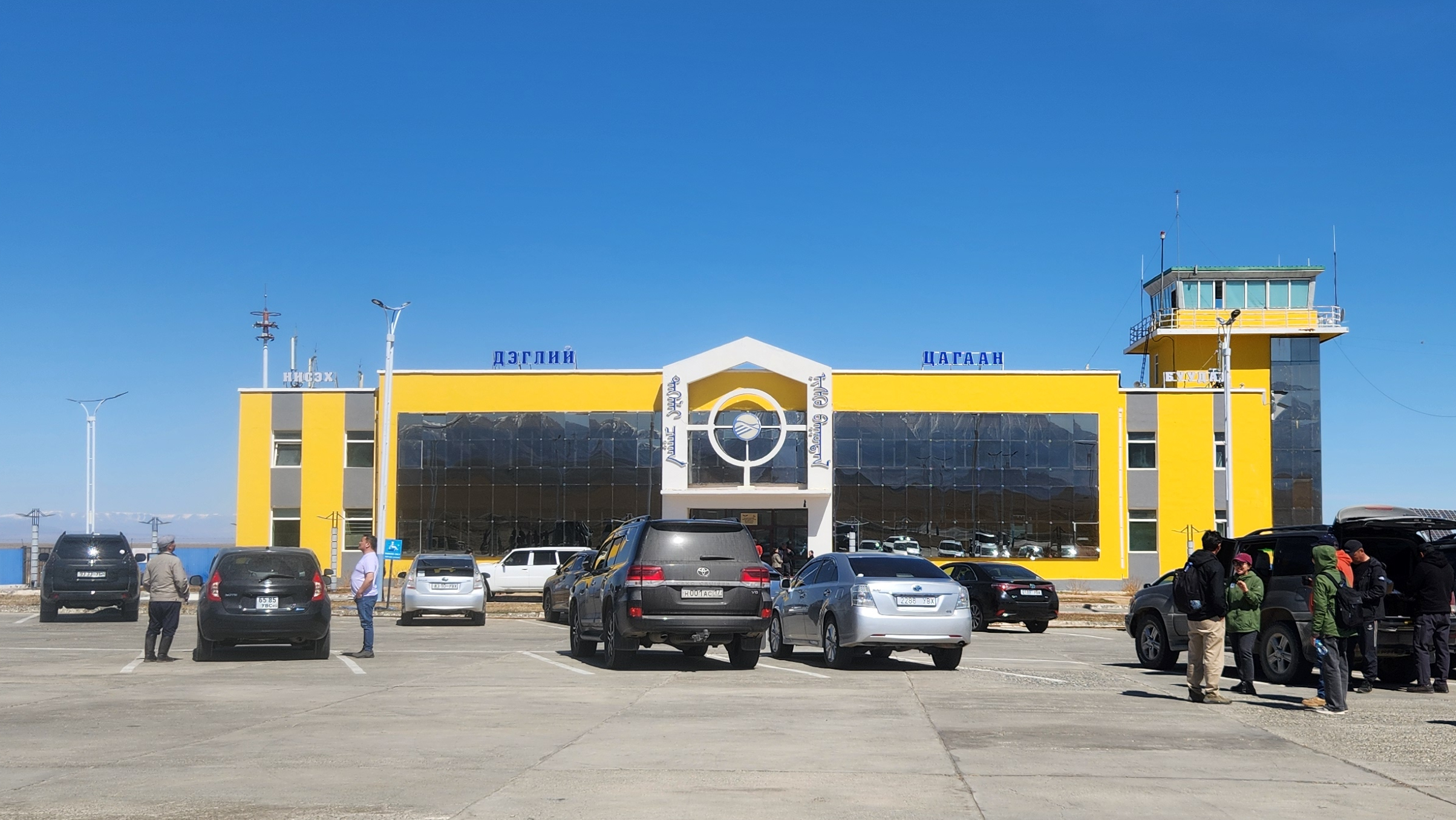
Ulaangom Airport

Ulaangom is connected to the Russian border by highway, and imports its electricity from the Russian Federation. The old airport is no longer in service. New Ulaangom Airport is called Deglii Tsagaan and it is situated north of the city. The new runway and terminal were completed in June 2011 and the first jetliner of Eznis Airways landed on June 26, 2011 from Ulaanbaatar. As of May 2017, Hunnu Air was the only airline that had regular scheduled flight from Ulaanbaatar.

== Notable natives ==
- Norovyn Altankhuyag, 25th Prime Minister of Mongolia
