= List of national parks of Mongolia =

#	Name	Photo	Location	Map	Area (km^{2})	Year	Description
1	Altai Tavan Bogd		Bayan-Ölgii Province; 48°33′N 88°37′E	List of national parks of Mongolia is located in Mongolia	6362	1996	Located in the Altai Mountains at the western extreme of Mongolia, the park ("Altai five saints nature complex") includes Tavan Bogd, the highest mountain in Mongolia. Within the park is The (UNESCO) World Heritage Site 'Petroglyphic Complexes of the Mongolian Altai'.
2	Gobi Gurvansaikhan		SouthGobi Province; 43°N 104°E	List of national parks of Mongolia is located in Mongolia	26947	1993	The park (Gobi three beauties nature complex) is located in the Gurvan Saikhan Mountains, in the Gobi Desert of south central Mongolia. It is the largest national park in Mongolia. Landmarks include Khongoryn Els, the "Singing Sands", a large complex of sand dunes that reach to the southeastern Altai Mountains.
3	Gorkhi-Terelj		Töv Province; 48°09′N 107°34′E	List of national parks of Mongolia is located in Mongolia	2932	1993	Gorkhi-Terelj is located 37 km east of the capital city of Ulaanbaatar. Attractions include Khagiin Khar Lake, a 20m deep glacial lake 80 km upstream from the tourist camps, and Yestii Hot Water Springs, natural hot springs 18 km further upstream. The park also has a Buddhist monastery that is open to visitors.
4	Khustain Nuruu		Töv Province; 47°46′N 105°53′E	List of national parks of Mongolia is located in Mongolia	506	1993	(Also called "Hustai Nuruu" (Birch Mountains), the park is located about 70 km west of Ulaanbaatar in central Mongolia. It is situated in steppe terrain along the Khentii Mountains, with the Tuul River flowing through its borders. It is part of the UNESCO Man and Biosphere site "Husai Nuruu", and is supporting the reintroduction of the endangered Przewalski's horse.
5	Lake Khövsgöl		Khövsgöl Province; 51°12′N 100°50′E	List of national parks of Mongolia is located in Mongolia	8381	1992	The park covers territory surrounding Lake Khovsgul, the largest freshwater lake in Mongolia (over 1,000 square miles and averaging over 450 feet in depth). Located in northwestern Mongolia on the border with Russia, Lake Khovsgul is sometimes referred to as a "younger sister" of Lake Baikal to the north.
6	Khyargas Nuur		Khovd Province; 47°58′N 92°50′E	List of national parks of Mongolia is located in Mongolia	8503	1997	Khyargas Nuur is a large (1,481 km2) salt lake in the Great Lakes Basin of western Mongolia, surrounded by desert and scrub. It is half-way between Uvs Lake, 70 km to the north, and Har Us Nuur National Park, 70 km to the south. The lake is known for hot springs.
7	Tarvagatai Nuruu		Zavkhan Province; 48°N 97.5°E	List of national parks of Mongolia is located in Mongolia	6576	2000	The park covers the southwestern sector of the Tarvagatai Range of the Khangai Mountains in central Mongolia. The park is remote, protecting a transition zone between semi-arid steppe to the south and coniferous forests on the northern slope of the range. A large fire burned a significant part of the park in 2002, including 800 square kilometres (310 sq mi) of forest.
8	Tsambagarav Uul		Bayan-Ölgii Province; 48.7°N 91°E	List of national parks of Mongolia is located in Mongolia	1137	2000	Mt Tsambagarav is a stand-alone mountain of the Mongol Altai Mountains, rising to an elevation of 4,193 metres (13,757 ft). The park features glaciers, rocky gorges, and glacial lakes.
9	Bulgan Gol-Ikh Ongog		Bayan-Ölgii Province; 46.1°N 91.16°E	List of national parks of Mongolia is located in Mongolia	927	2011	The Bulgan River divides into many meandering streams, lakes, and wetlands as if flow through the valley in the park. The area is an important stopover for migratory birds. Species in the park include the vulnerable eastern imperial eagle, and the lesser kestrel.
10	Chigertein Golin Ai Sav		Bayan-Ölgii Province; 47.8°N 90.25°E	List of national parks of Mongolia is located in Mongolia	1672	2012	The Chigertey River Valley is a 20-mile wide glacial valley west of Delüünin the Altai Mountains on Mongolia's western border with China. Larch forests grow on the northern slopes of the mountains from elevations of 2,400-2,800 meters.
11	Dariganga		Sükhbaatar Province; 45.25°N 114.0°E	List of national parks of Mongolia is located in Mongolia	645	2004	The park is on the Dariganga Plateau in southeastern Mongolia. Both Gobi desert and steppe habitats are featured around Ganga Lake. The site is a Ramsar Convention wetland of international importance, supporting breeding and migratory waterbirds such as the vulnerable white-naped crane and the vulnerable great bustard.
12	Har Us Nuur		Khovd Province; 48.3°N 92.74°E	List of national parks of Mongolia is located in Mongolia	8503	1997	The park is centered on Khar-Us Lake, Khar Lake and Dörgön Lake in the Great Lakes Basin of western Mongolia.
13	Ikh Bogd Uul		Bayankhongor Province; 45°N 100.3°E	List of national parks of Mongolia is located in Mongolia	2629	2008	Ikh Bogd ("Great Saint") is the highest mountain in the Altai-Gobi Mountains, a southeastern spur range of the Altai. The middle and high elevations feature alpine meadows and montane steppe. The range, with semi-arid deserts to the north and south, supports rare species, such as the near-threatened argali (Ovis ammon) and Pallas's cat (Otocolobus manul).
14	Khangai Nuruu		Arkhangai Province; 47.2°N 101.4°E	List of national parks of Mongolia is located in Mongolia	8885	1996	The park stretches across the middle ranges of the greater Khangai Mountains in west-central Mongolia. In the northeastern area of the park is the famous Tövkhön Monastery.
15	Khan-Khokhi Khyargas Mountain		Uvs Province; 49.42°N 94.79°E	List of national parks of Mongolia is located in Mongolia	3413	2000	The Khan-Khokhi mountains are a western extension of the Khangai Mountains in Uvs Province. The mountains separate the Uvs Depression to the north from the Khyargas Lake depression to the south. The Khan-Khokhii National Park is a separate territory from that of Khyargas Nuur National Park, 20 km to the south.
16	Khorgo-Terkhiin Tsagaan Nuur		Arkhangai Province; 48.2°N 99.8°E	List of national parks of Mongolia is located in Mongolia	773	1965	The park is centered on Terkhiin Tsagaan Lake, a freshwater lake in the Khangai Mountains, and the nearby Khorgo volcano (extinct).
17	Mongol Els		Zavkhan Province; 47.6°N 94.7°E	List of national parks of Mongolia is located in Mongolia	2713	2010	This particular "Mongolian Sands" National Park is about 100 km southeast of Khar Lake (Khovd). It covers a sand deposit 300 km long across the Zavkhan River valley.
18	Munkhkhairkhan		Bayan-Ölgii Province; 47°N 92.5°E	List of national parks of Mongolia is located in Mongolia	5061	2011	The park is centered on Mönkhkhairkhan Mountain, the second highest mountain in Mongolia.
19	Myangan-Ugalzat		Khovd Province; 46.3°N 93.2°E	List of national parks of Mongolia is located in Mongolia	3038	2011	The park covers a sector high desert steppe of the Mongol Altai Mountains in western Mongolia. The park was established to protect its populations of the vulnerable Altai argali (Ovis ammon ammon).
20	Noyon Khangai		Arkhangai Province; 47.75°N 99.50°E	List of national parks of Mongolia is located in Mongolia	591	1998	The Noyon Khangai Mountains are a range in the south-central region of the greater Khangai Mountains. There are geothermal hot springs in the area at an altitude of 2,300 metres (7,500 ft).
21	Onon-Balj		Khentii Province; 48.98°N 111.1°E	List of national parks of Mongolia is located in Mongolia	4148	2000	Onon-Balj covers the confluence of the Onon River and Balj River in Dadal Soum of Khentii Province. The area features many rivers, lakes, and desert steppe terrain.
22	Orkhon Valley		Övörkhangai Province; 47.45°N 102.72°E	List of national parks of Mongolia is located in Mongolia	3530	2006	Valley of the Orkhon River east of the Khangai Mountains, on pastureland, and with many historical and archaeological sites. The site of Kharkhorum, the capital of Genghis Khan's 13th-century empire. A UNESCO World Heritage Site ('Orkhon Valley Cultural Landscape'), and UICN protected area ('Orxoni Xundii').
23	Siilxem Nuruu		Bayan-Ölgii Province; 49.74°N 89.87°E	List of national parks of Mongolia is located in Mongolia	881	2000	Spread across two separate sectors along the border with Russia in the Siilkhem Mountains, northeast of Altai Tavan Bogd. Sector 'A' is the northernmost range of the Altai argali and Sector 'B' is habitat for the snow leopard.
24	Tengis-Shishged		Khövsgöl Province; 51.49°N 98.73°E	List of national parks of Mongolia is located in Mongolia	8757	2000	The park covers the lower Shishged River as if flows west from the Darkhad Valley in northern Mongolia. The landscape is one of high peaks with steep sides and wide glaciated valleys. It protects a cultural region of the Dukha people, nomadic reindeer herders.
25	Tujiin Nars		Selenge Province; 50.1°N 106.4°E	List of national parks of Mongolia is located in Mongolia	708	2002	Tujiin Nars is a pine forest in Selenge Province, in northern Mongolia. An extensive reforestation effort is underway in the park, recovering from forest fires and illegal logging in the 1990s.
26	Ulaagchini Khar Nuur		Zavkhan Province; 48.37°N 95.62°E	List of national parks of Mongolia is located in Mongolia	2594	2010	The park encompasses two large freshwater lakes, Bayan Lake to the west, and Ulaagchin Khar Lake 50 km to the east. This is the 'Khar Lake' in Zavkhan Province located in a depression below the Tarvagatai Mountains. Ulaagchin Khar is surrounded by sand dunes and mountains.
27	Undurkhaan Uul		Khentii Province; 47.5°N 110.45°E	List of national parks of Mongolia is located in Mongolia	88	2012	The site is small, covering an isolated mountain surrounded by low areas, about 25 km north of Öndörkhaan.
28	Khugnu-Tarna		Bulgan Province; 47.47°N 103.64°E	List of national parks of Mongolia is located in Mongolia	841	2003	Khogno Khan Mountain is about 60 km east of Kharakoram. The park features many historical sites, including the ruins of a 17th-century monastery.
29	Zag Baidragiin Goliin Ekhen Sav		Bayankhongor Province; 47.5°N 99.46°E	List of national parks of Mongolia is located in Mongolia	1163	2012	The park covers valleys of the Baidrag River and Zag River as they flow south from the Khangai Mountains in west-central Mongolio.
