= List of islands of Mongolia =

This is a list of islands of Mongolia, a landlocked country in East Asia that is the most sparsely populated country in the world. Most islands, due to their humid surroundings, serve as stopovers for migrantic birds.

Name	Lake	Province	Area
Dalain-Modon-Khuis (Wooden Boy Island), Khadan khui, Modot tolgoi, Baga khui	Lake Khövsgöl	Khövsgöl Province	Dalain-Modon-Khuis: about 7 km²
Peaks of Khetsuu Khad	Khyargas Lake	Uvs Province	
Bird Island	Khyargas Lake	Uvs Province	
Three islands on Telmen Lake	Telmen Lake	Zavkhan Province	
2 islands: Small and Big Avgash/(Ikh and Baga Avgash)	Khar Lake (Zavkhan)	Zavkhan Province	
About Twenty islands on Khurgan Lake	Khurgan Lake	Bayan-Ölgii Province	
Khoton Lake island	Khoton Lake	Bayan-Ölgii Province	
Over 20 of which the biggest is called Agbash	Khar-Us Lake	Khovd Province	274 km²
