= Altai-Sayan region =

Region in central Asia

The Altai-Sayan region is an area of Inner Asia proximate to the Altai Mountains and the Sayan Mountains, near to where Russia, China, Mongolia and Kazakhstan come together. This region is one of the world centers of temperate plant diversity. Its biological, landscape, historical, cultural and religious diversity is unique. 3,726 species of vascular plants are registered in the region including 700 threatened or rare species, 317 of which are endemic; fauna consists of 680 species, 6% of which are endemic. Its ecosystem is comparatively unchanged since the last ice age, and it is the host of endangered species that include the saiga, nerpa, and snow leopard. It is the focus of ongoing international and regional environmental conservation initiatives.

The area is culturally diverse, with four extant language groups (Mongolic, Turkic, Sinitic and Slavic, and formerly Samoyedic and Yeniseian), and more than 20 indigenous ethnic groups practicing traditional land use systems. There are also a variety of religions including Christianity, Islam, Buddhism, Tengrism and Shamanism. The region covers more than one million square kilometers, and has a population of between 5 and 6 million inhabitants.

== Geography ==
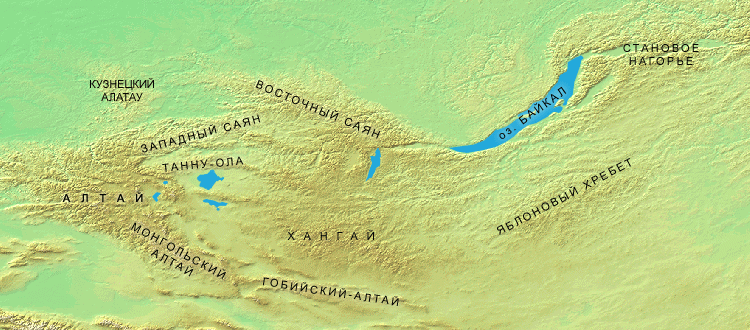
Physical map (Altay, Sayan, Baikal, Mongolian Altai)

The Altai-Sayan ecoregions contain and share a name with the Altai Mountains and the Sayan Mountains. The Altai Mountains are a mountain range in East-Central Asia, where Russia, China, Mongolia and Kazakhstan come together, and are where the rivers Irtysh and Ob have their headwaters. The Sayan Mountains lie between northwestern Mongolia and southern Siberia.

The Altai-Sayan has a total area of 1,065,000 square kilometers. Its area belongs to the territory of Russia (62%), Mongolia (29%), Kazakhstan (5%) and China (4%).

Part or all of the Russian oblasts of Kemerovo, Novosibirsk, and Irkutsk; the Krais of Altai and Krasnoyarsk; and the Autonomous Republics of Altai, Khakassia, Tuva, and Buryatia lie within the Altai-Sayan, as do parts of the Ili Kazakh Autonomous Prefecture of China's Xinjiang Uyghur Autonomous Region, East Kazakhstan province of Kazakhstan, and the Mongolian Aimags of Govi-Altai, Khovd, Bayan-Ölgii, Uvs, Zavkhan, and Khövsgöl.

At the far north of the Altai-Sayan region, near its boundary, is the Russian city of Krasnoyarsk (population above 900,000 in 2010 census). Other towns in the region include Kyzyl in Russia (pop. about 110,000 in 2008), as well as Ulaangom, Ulgii, and Khovd, all in Mongolia (each with population under 30,000). The Russian town of Gorno-Altaysk (pop. about 60,000 in 2010) lies within the region near its western boundary, and the Russian city of Irkutsk lies just outside the region to its east. The Altai-Sayan region's total population is estimated as about 5.5 million.

Contained within this ecoregion is the Great Lakes Hollow, a large semi-arid depression, bounded by the Altai in the West, Khangai in the East and Tannu-Ola Mountains in the North. This contains six major lakes: the saline lakes Uvs Nuur, Khyargas Nuur and Dörgön Nuur; and freshwater lake Khar-Us Nuur, Khar Nuur and Airag Nuur. These are remnants of the West Siberian Glacial Lake, a periglacial lake formed when the Arctic Ocean outlets for each of the Ob and Yenisei rivers were blocked by the Barents-Kara Ice Sheet during the Weichselian Glaciation, approximately 80,000 years ago.

== Cultural history ==
According to Anatoliy Mandych, a geographer at the Russian Academy of Sciences (see also WWF),

For many centuries, the region has been at the crossroads of European and Asian civilizations, and thus is home to great historical treasures. The ancient history of the region is so unique that many historians and archaeologists call it "the cradle of civilization". The ancient historic monuments are integrated into the natural landscape in such a way that it forms a harmonious and inseparable unity. Thousands of petroglyphs, cave paintings, antique burial mounds, menhirs, steles, tumuli and other ancient monuments are found in the area, some even as ancient as the Egyptian pyramids.

== Anthropology ==
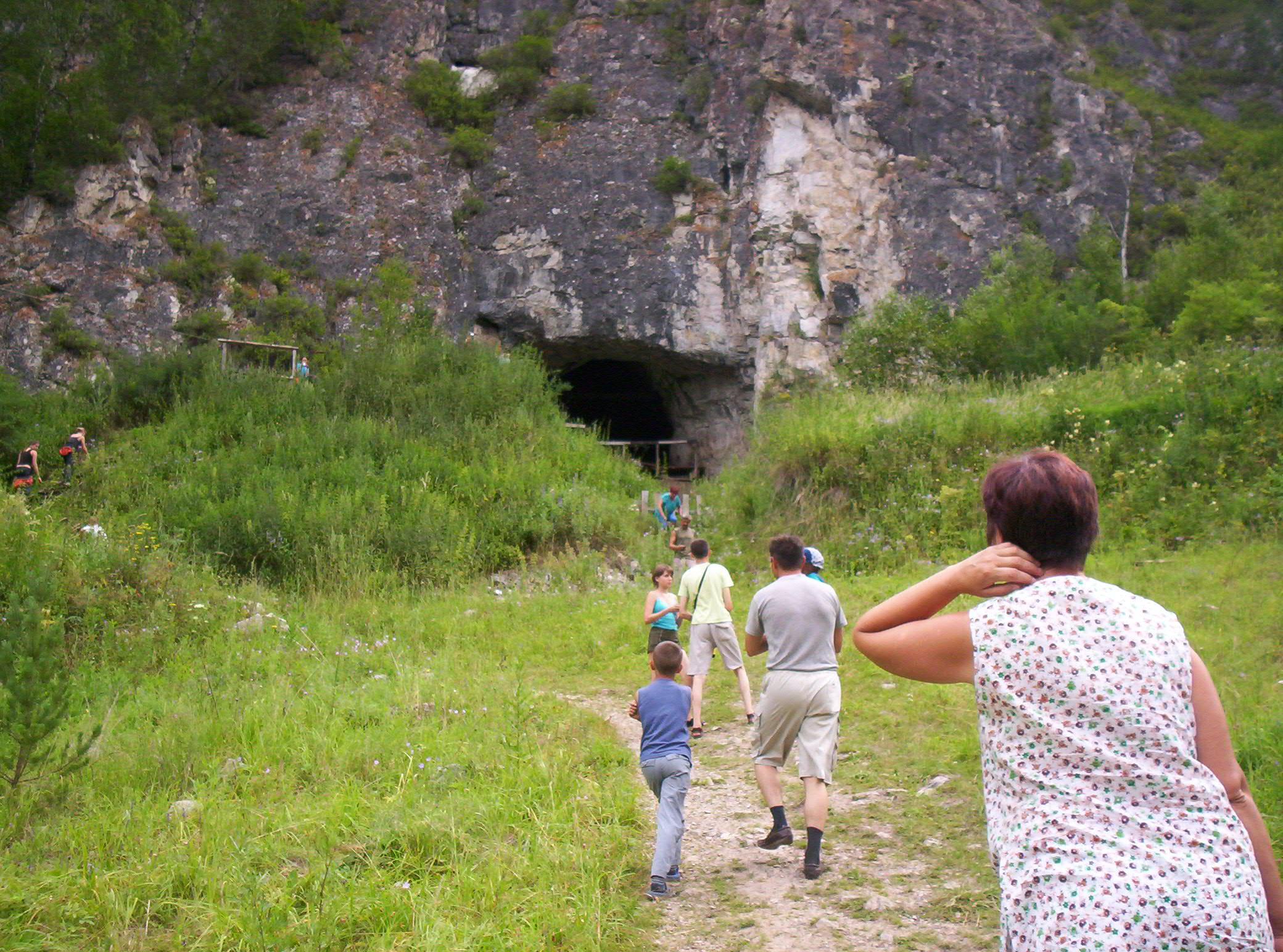
Tourists in front of the Denisova Cave, where the first Denisovan remains were found

Altai-Sayan is home to the Denisova cave, famous for the 2010 discovery of 50,000-year-old fossils of a new kind of human, the Denisovans. Since then, Neanderthal bones, and tools crafted by Homo sapiens have been found in the cave. This makes it the only place where all three hominins have been known to live. Conditions in the Altai-Sayan are stable, so ancient humans may have taken refuge there during glacial interchanges and lived off the diverse game species. Malaya Syya in Khakassia, another ancient archeological site in the region, has been dated to 35,000 BCE.

Recent genetic studies have shown that some indigenous peoples of the Americas are partially derived from southern Altaians.

== Ecology and preservation ==
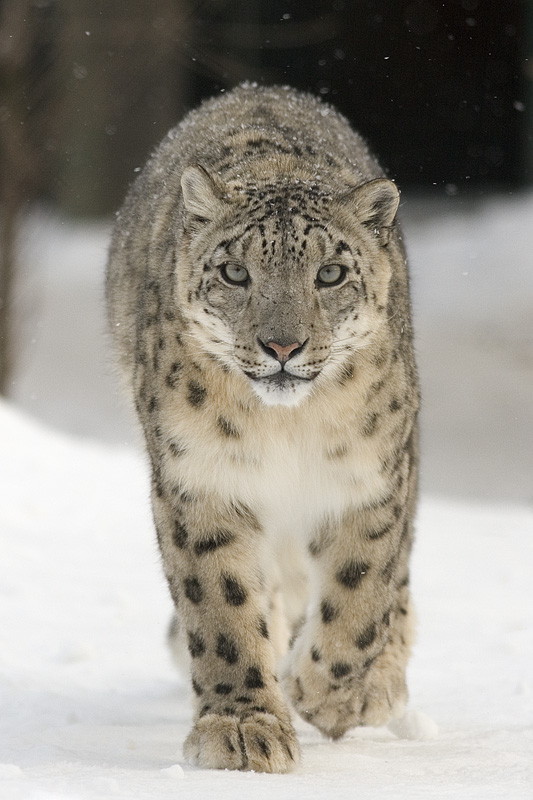
Snow leopard, a globally endangered species whose northernmost habitat is in the Altai-Sayan region.

According to the New Scientist, the mix of mammals in the Altai-Sayan region has been among the least changed since the last ice age, in comparison to the mammalian population of any other region on earth. Its stability over time suggests that it may have acted as a refugium for mammoth steppe fauna both during and between ice ages.

There are three major UNESCO World Culture and Natural Heritage Sites in the ecoregion – the Golden Mountains of Altai, consisting of the Altai and Katun Natural Reserves, Lake Teletskoye, Belukha Mountain, and the Ukok Plateau; Lake Baikal, which forms part of the eastern border of the region, and Uvs Nuur Basin in the Great Lakes Hollow.

The Great Lakes Hollow, in addition to its saline lakes, contains some of the most important wetlands of Central Asia. The wetlands are based on the system of interconnected shallow lakes with wide reed belts within the steppe. As a key part of the Central Asian Flyway, the wetlands support a number of rare and endangered migrating birds: Eurasian spoonbill (Platalea leucorodia), black stork (Ciconia nigra), osprey (Pandion haliaetus), white-tailed eagle (Haliaeetus albicilla), swan goose (Cygnopsis cygnoides), bar-headed goose (Anser indicus), and white pelican Pelecanus onocrotalus.

The World Wildlife Fund has conducted studies of the region. It has identified the Altai-Sayan ecoregion as a priority region for wildlife conservation. According to the World Wildlife Fund, "The Altai-Sayan ecoregion is one of the last remaining untouched areas of the world." Furthermore:

680 species of the vertebrates are registered in the Ecoregion. Among them: 77 species of fishes, 8 species of amphibians, 25 species of reptiles, 425 species of birds and 143 species of mammals.

Threats to the biodiversity of the region, according to the Fund, include poaching and illegal wildlife trade, industrial development, climate change, overgrazing and competition for pastures, unsustainable forestry, water pollution, and poverty.

Beginning in the late 1990s, several government-level initiatives were begun with the stated purpose that included helping to preserve the Altai-Sayan ecoregion and biodiversity. In 1998, representatives of Kazakhstan, China, Mongolia and Russia met in Urumqi to organize a trans-boundary nature reserve and launch joint biodiversity conservation programs. That same year, several republics in the Russian Federation (Tyva, Khakassia and Altai) also signed an environmental protection agreement. Five years later, in March 2003,

organizations representing state governments of Altai Region (Russia), Bayan-Ulgii Aimag (Mongolia), Eastern Kazakhstan Region (Kazakhstan), the Republic of Altai (Russia), Xinjiang Uygur Autonomous Region (China) and Khovd Aimag (Mongolia) resolved to establish an International Steering Board called "Altai, Our Common Home"

However, as of 2010, the steering organization "Altai, Our Common Home" had played a coordinating role "less in conservation and ecological themes" than in "economic and cultural exchange programmes". Analysts stated that "while the [ecosystem conservation] soil has been prepared for cultivation rather well", after 10 years "there are no tangible results yet". They expressed concern that

At the 'grass roots' level, managers of transboundary protected areas were not involved in the process. The leading role was played by international NGOs and funders. Overall, the general concept was not clearly formulated and developed.

The Altai-Sayan region is the northernmost habitat of the snow leopard. a species listed on the IUCN Red List of Threatened Species as globally vulnerable.

== Science and scholarship ==
The Altai-Sayan region, or phenomena associated with it, have been the focus of various types of science and scholarship in diverse fields:

- Geneticists speak of the Altai-Sayan region when referring to certain human populations from that region.
- Geologists describe the Altai-Sayan region as the site of a Paleo-Asian ocean.
- Historians refer to the Altai-Sayan peoples.

== See also ==
- South Central Siberia
