= Ulaagchinii Khar Nuur National Park =

National park of Mongolia

Ulaagchinii Khar Nuur National Park (also: Ulaagchiin Khar Nuur)
- Mongolian: Улаагчийн Хар Нуур
- IUCN category II (national park)
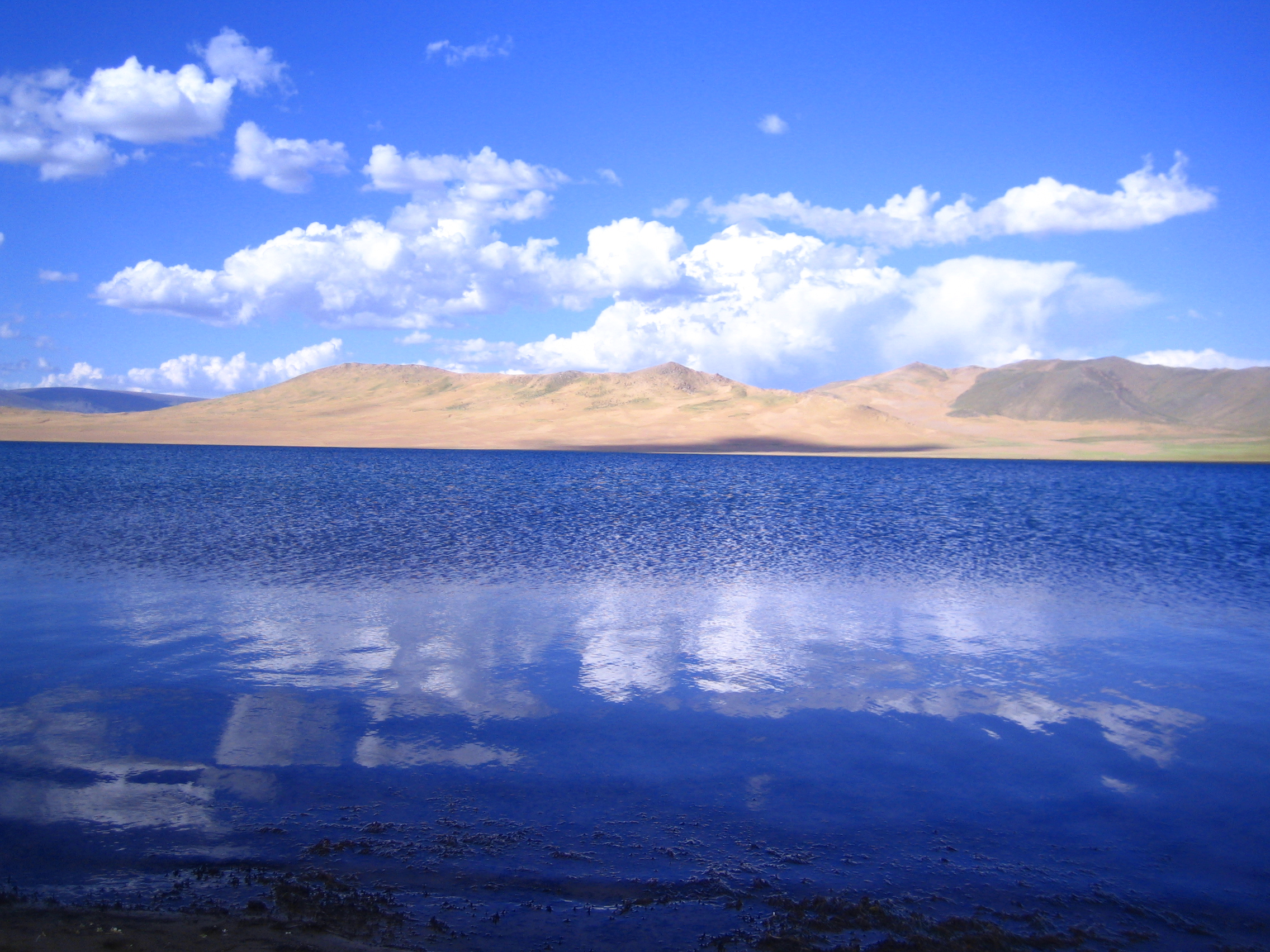
- Ulaagchini Khar Lake

- Location within Mongolia
- Location: Mongolia
- Coordinates: 48.37°N 95.62°E
- Area: 2,594 square kilometres (1,002 sq mi)
- Established: 2010; 16 years ago
- Governing body: Ministry of Environment and Green Development of Mongolia

Ulaagchinii Khar Nuur National Park (Mongolian: Улаагчийн Хар Нуур) is centered on two large freshwater lakes, Bayan Lake to the west, and Ulaagchin Khar Lake 50 km to the east, in west-central Mongolia. The particular 'Khar Lake' of this park is in Zavkhan Province, located in a depression west of the Tarvagatai Mountains. Ulaagchin Khar is surrounded by sand dunes and mountains.

== Topography ==
Both lakes are located in the Great Lakes Depression area of western Mongolia, with the Tarvagatai range of the Khangai Mountains immediately to the east. The larger of the lakes, Ulaagchinii Khar Nuur, is freshwater and bordered by sand dunes and local hills to the south. It is 23 km west to east and 5 km north to south, and has a small lake, Baga Lake, to its northwest. 60 km to the west is Bayan Lake. The lakes are at an altitude of about 2,000 meters (6,600 ft).

== Climate and ecoregion ==
The climate of the area is Cold semi-arid climate (Köppen climate classification (BSk)). This climate is characteristic of steppe climates intermediary between desert humid climates, and typically have precipitation above evapotranspiration. At least one month averages below 0 °C (32 °F).

== Flora and fauna ==
the area is a cold semi-desert. A number of rare waterbirds have been noted at the site, including the endangered White-headed duck (Oxyura leucocephala), the vulnerable Great bustard (Otis tarda), and the vulnerable White-throated bush chat (Saxicola insignis).

== See also ==
- List of national parks of Mongolia
