= Khar Nuur =

Khar Nuur (Mongolian: Хар нуур, black lake) may refer to either of two lakes in Mongolia:

- Khar Lake (Zavkhan) (Har Nuur)
- Khar Lake (Khovd)
