= Oreoleuciscus dsapchynensis =

Scientific classification
- Kingdom: Animalia
- Phylum: Chordata
- Class: Actinopterygii
- Order: Cypriniformes
- Family: Leuciscidae
- Genus: Oreoleuciscus
- Species: O. dsapchynensis

Binomial name
- Oreoleuciscus dsapchynensis Warpachowski, 1889

Synonyms
- Leuciscus pewzowi Herzenstein, 1883; Oreoleuciscus pewzowi Warpachowski, 1889

Species of fish

Oreoleuciscus dsapchynensis is a species of freshwater ray-finned fish belonging to the family Leuciscidae, which contains the daces, chubs, true minnows and related species. This species is endemic to Airag Lake and the Zavkhan River in Mongolia. It reaches a maximum standard length of 28 cm (11 in) and it feeds on phytoplankton, plants and invertebrates.
