= Tovkhosh Mountains =

Mountain range in Mongolia

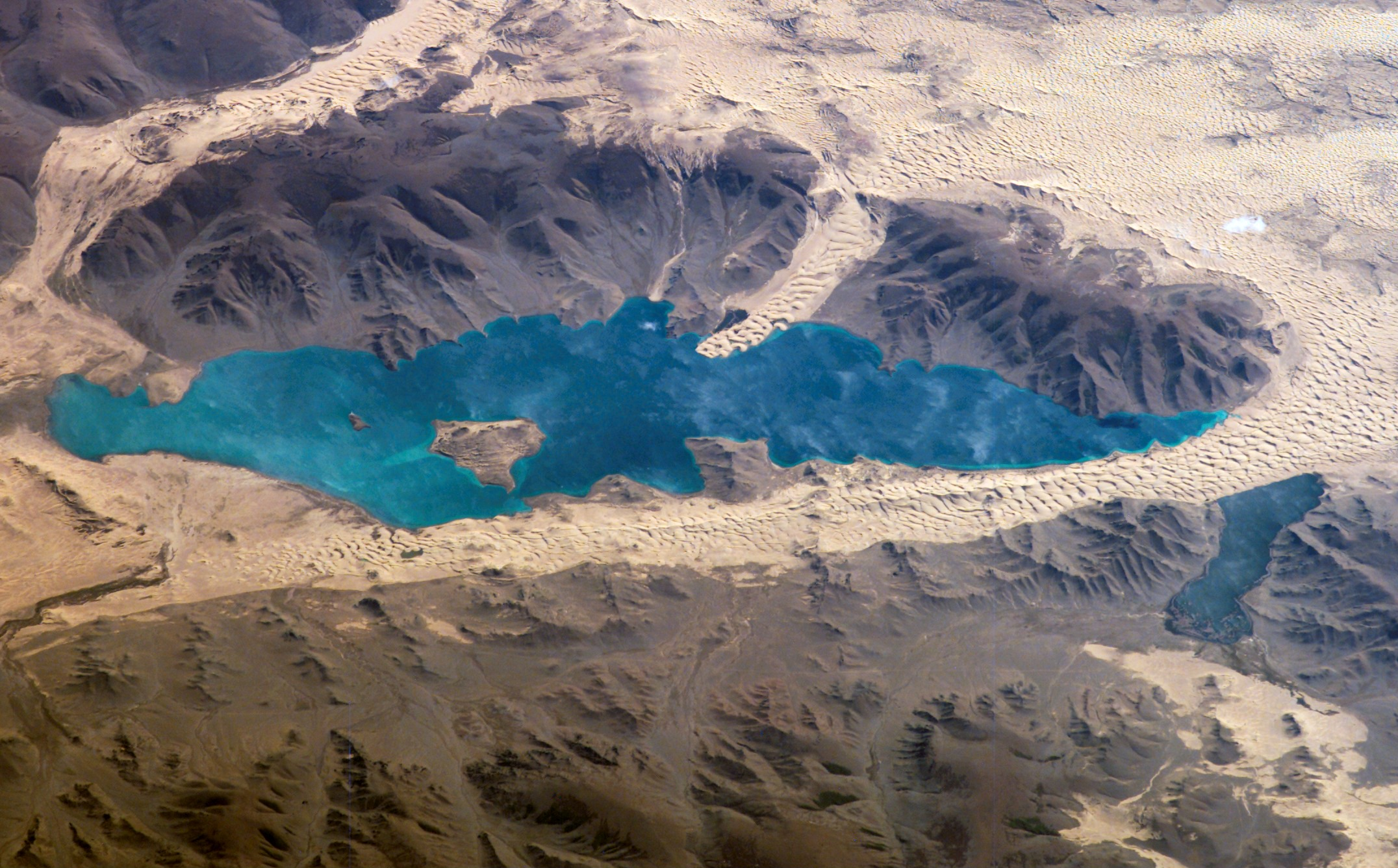
- Tovkhosh Mountains to the top right (south west) of Khar Lake

Highest point
- Coordinates: 48°21′16″N 95°57′50″E

Geography
- Location within Mongolia
- Location: Erdenekhairkhan Sum, Zavkhan, Mongolia

Tovkhosh Mountains (Mongolian: Товхош уул; in some sources Tobhata Mountains) is an area of mountains in Mongolia, on the south western shore of Khar lake in the Zavkhan Aimag.

Tobhata Uul is another name for the mountain. It is located in Dzabkhan, Mongolia.

== Annotated view ==
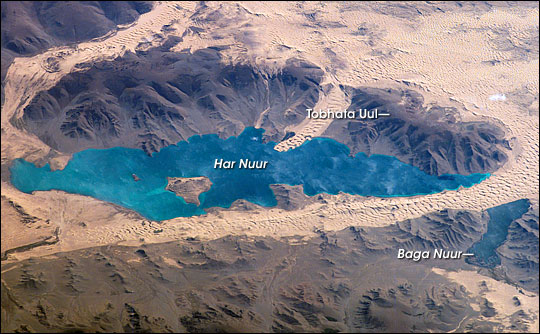
Labeled view of the area. This uses the term Tobhata Uul for the mountain
