= Khan-Khokhi Khyargas Mountain National Park =

National park in Uvs, Mongolia

- Mongolian: Хан Хөхий
- IUCN category II (national park)
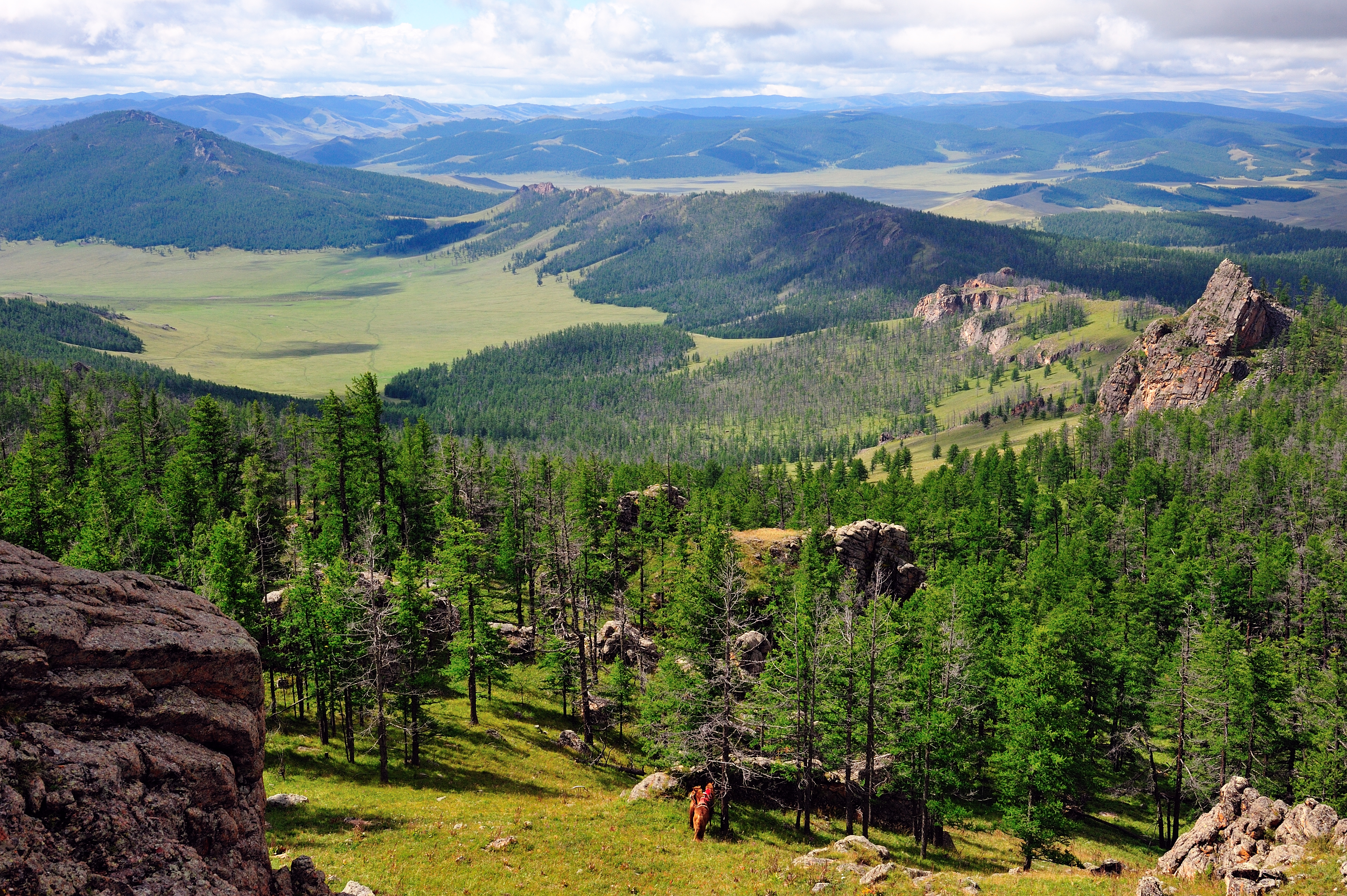
- Khan Khokhii Mountains

- Location within Mongolia
- Location: Mongolia
- Coordinates: 49.42°N 94.79°E
- Area: 3,413 square kilometres (843,371 acres; 1,318 sq mi)
- Established: 2000
- Governing body: Ministry of Environment and Green Development of Mongolia

Khan-Khokhi Khyargas Mountain National Park (Mongolian: Хан Хөхий) (also "Khan Khukhii") covers a western extension of the Khangai Mountains in Uvs Province. The mountains separate the Uvs Depression to the north from the Khyargas Lake depression to the south. Khan Khuckii is one of the "10 Sacred Mountains of Mongolia". The site features ancient burial mounds.

== Topography ==
The Khan-Khukhii National Park is a separate territory from that of Khyargas Nuur National Park, which is 20 km to the south. The highest point in the park is Altan Duulga, at 2,928 metres (9,606 ft). The mountain tops tend to be flat, and the slopes steep. The landscape was partially formed by glaciation.

== Climate and ecoregion ==
The climate of the area is Cold semi-arid climate (Köppen climate classification (BSk)). This climate is characteristic of steppe climates intermediary between desert humid climates, and typically have precipitation is above evapotranspiration. At least one month averages below 0 °C (32 °F).

== Flora and fauna ==
The northern slopes of the Khan Khukhii Mountains receive more precipitation (300 mm/year) than the southern slopes (150 mm/year). The north therefore supports greater variety in vertical zones - from steppe to mountain forest (Siberian larch and Siberian pine) to alpine meadows. The southern slopes have desert and semi-arid desert vegetation.

== See also ==
- List of national parks of Mongolia
