= Baga Nuur =

Lake in Zavkhan Province, Mongolia

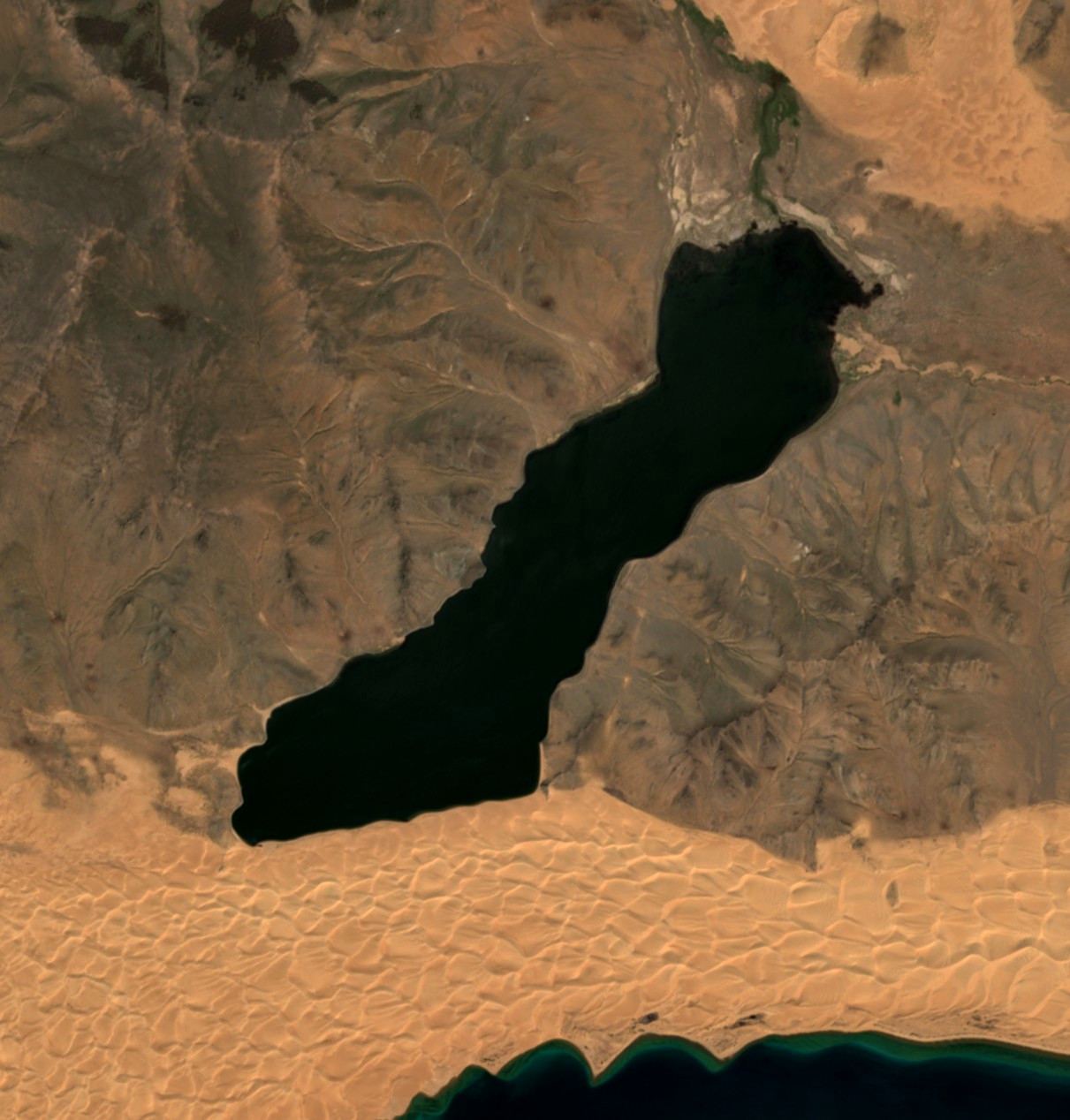
- Sentinel-2 image (2021)

- Location within Mongolia
- Location: Zavkhan Province, Mongolia
- Coordinates: 48°25′10″N 95°57′30″E
- Type: lake

Baga Nuur (Mongolian: Бага нуур, lit. 'small lake') is a lake in the Zavkhan Aimag in Mongolia, separated from Khar lake by a band of sand dunes, the estimated terrain elevation above sea level is 1131 metres.

== Variant forms of spelling for Baga Nuur or in other languages ==
Pa-ha Po

Ozero Baga-nur

Baga noru Mizu-umi

Pu-ch’ia No-erh

Lake Baga-kur

Ozero Baga-Nor

Pa-ka Hu

Baga Nuur

Baga Nuur

Baga noru Mizu-umi

Lake Baga-kur

Ozero Baga-Nor

Ozero Baga-nur

Pa-ha Po

Pa-ka Hu

Pu-ch'ia No-erh

Pu-ch’ia No-erh.
