= Santmargats, Zavkhan =

District in Zavkhan Province, Mongolia

Coordinates: 48°35′15″N 95°25′59″E

Santmargats District Сантмаргац сум ᠰᠠᠩᠲᠤᠮᠠᠷᠭᠠᠴᠠ ᠰᠤᠮᠤ
- District
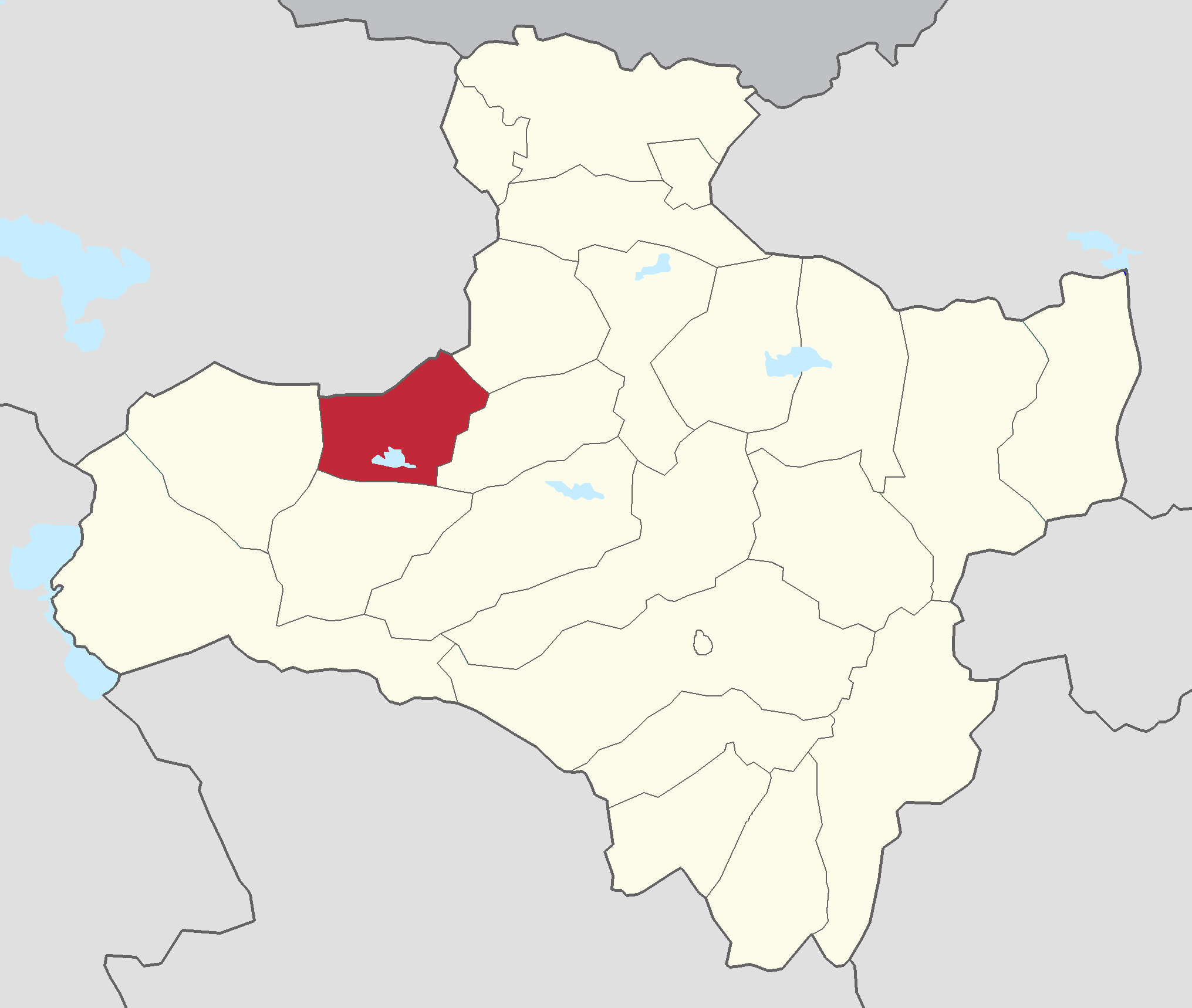
- Country: Mongolia
- Province: Zavkhan Province
- Time zone: UTC+8 (UTC + 8)
- Climate: BSk

Santmargats (Mongolian: Сантмаргац) is a sum of Zavkhan Province in western Mongolia. Is a combined name representing the Sant and Margats mountain ranges. Sant is a type of local flora (or means peaceful), while Margats refers to chalcedony or jasper stones. In 2005, its population was 2,101.

== Geology ==
- Bayan Lake

== Administrative divisions ==
The district is divided into four bags, which are:

- Bayan-Ulaan
- Bayandavs
- Bayannuur
- Kholboo
