= Khogno Khan National Park =

National park in Bulgan, Mongolia

Khogno Khan National Park (Also: Khugnu-Tarna)
- Mongolian: Хөгнө Хан
- IUCN category II (national park)
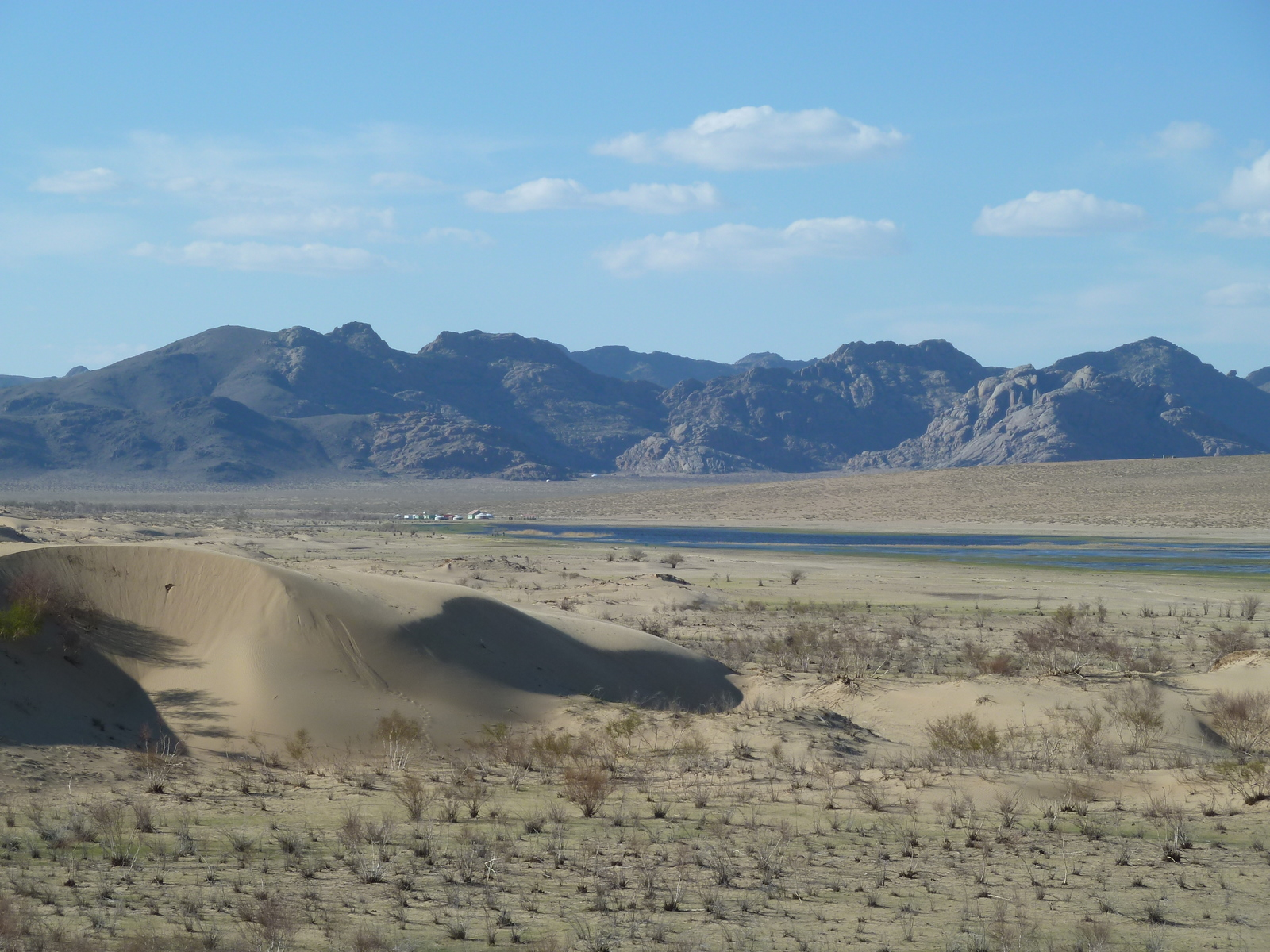
- Rashaant, Mongolia

- Location within Mongolia
- Location: Mongolia
- Coordinates: 47.47°N 103.64°E
- Area: 841 square kilometres (325 sq mi)
- Established: 2003
- Governing body: Ministry of Environment and Green Development of Mongolia

Khogno Khan National Park (Mongolian: Хөгнө Хан) is centered on Khogno Khan Mountain, about 60 km east of Kharakoram. The park features many historical sites, including the ruins of a 17th-century monastery. It is located in Gurvanbulag District of Bulgan Province, about 240 km west of Ulaanbaatar.

== See also ==
- List of national parks of Mongolia
