= Ikh Bogd Uul National Park =

National park of Mongolia

- Mongolian: Их Богд уул
- IUCN category II (national park)
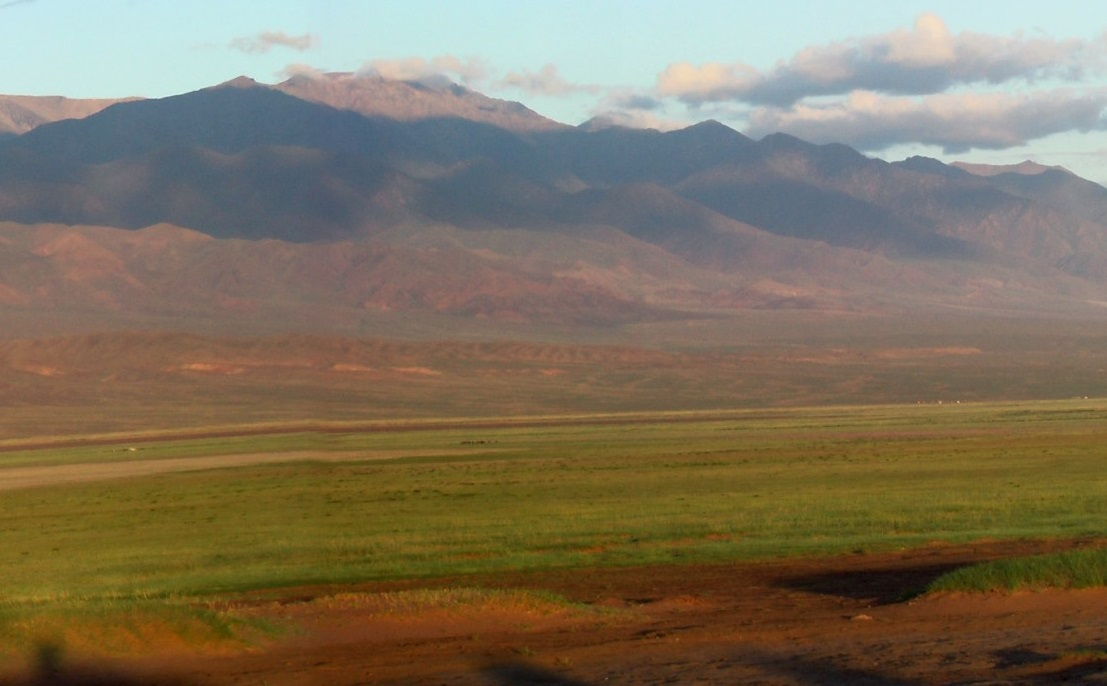
- Ikh Bogd Uul (Mountain)

- Location within Mongolia
- Location: Mongolia
- Coordinates: 45°N 100.3°E
- Area: 2,629 square kilometres (1,015 sq mi)
- Established: 2008
- Governing body: Ministry of Environment and Green Development of Mongolia

Ikh Bogd Uul National Park (Mongolian: Их Богд уул) is centered on Ikh Bogd ("Great Saint"), the highest mountain in the Altai-Gobi Mountains, a southeastern spur range of the Altai. The middle and high elevations feature alpine meadows and montane steppe. The range, with semi-arid deserts to the north and south, supports rare species, such as the near-threatened argali (Ovis ammon) and Pallas's cat (Otocolobus manul).

== Topography ==
The Altai Mountains extend southeastward into Mongolia in a chain of thin ridges, of which Ikh Bogd is the farthest major ridge. The Ihk Bogd ridge itself is topped by a flat plateau, and a high point at Tergun-Bogd, with an elevation of 3,957 metres (12,982 ft).

== Climate and ecoregion ==
The climate of the area is cold semi-arid climate (Köppen climate classification (BSk)). This climate is characteristic of steppe climates intermediary between desert humid climates, and typically have precipitation is above evapotranspiration. At least one month averages below 0 °C (32 °F).<ref">Kottek, M.; Grieser, J.; Beck, C.; Rudolf, B.; Rubel, F. (2006). "World Map of Koppen-Geiger Climate Classification Updated" (PDF). Gebrüder Borntraeger 2006.</ref>

== Flora and fauna ==
The park is at mid-to-high elevations supporting montane steppe and subalpine meadows. The top of the plateau is bare of vegetation. As of 2007, scientists in the park had recorded 500 species of vascular plants in 218 genera and 51 families. The area is an important site for Eurasian steppe species of birds, including the vulnerable white-throated bush chat (Saxicola insignis), the Henderson's ground jay (Podoces hendersoni), and the Altai snowcock (Tetraogallus altaicus).

== See also ==
- List of national parks of Mongolia
