= Oreoleuciscus angusticephalus =

Scientific classification
- Kingdom: Animalia
- Phylum: Chordata
- Class: Actinopterygii
- Order: Cypriniformes
- Family: Leuciscidae
- Genus: Oreoleuciscus
- Species: O. angusticephalus

Binomial name
- Oreoleuciscus angusticephalus Bogutskaya, 2001

Species of fish

Oreoleuciscus angusticephalus, the narrow-headed Altai osman, is a species of freshwater ray-finned fish belonging to the family Leuciscidae, which contains the daces, chubs, true minnows and related species. It is endemic to Mongolia and has a maximum standard length of 23.8 centimetres (9.4 in). Its young feed on plankton while adults feed predominantly on fish. It has a lifespan of over 40 years and takes 8–9 years to mature.
