= Khetsuu Khad =

Rock formation in Khyargas Lake, Mongolia

Coordinates: 49°2′6″N 93°28′39″E

Khetsuu Khad (Mongolian: Хэцүү хад; English: "Difficult Cliff") is a rock formation located on the southern shore of Khyargas Lake in Uvs Province, western Mongolia. The rock is approximately 5–7 km long including underwater parts and rises from the waters on the shore of the lake, creating island-like appearances. The peaks rising from the water are up to 20 meters high.

== Tourism ==
It is a popular subject for landscape photographers and travelers. Access to the attraction is characterized by loose sand and soft ground. Travel by car is recommended.

== Wildlife ==
The lake is a nesting site for migratory birds such as the waterfowl. The birds' main food sources are the fish species in the lake. Among them are the Altai stickleback, Osman, Mongolian whitefish, and sturgeon.

== Population ==
A small local ger camp is located next to the site and hosts tourists.
