= Oreoleuciscus potanini =

Conservation status
- Least Concern (IUCN 3.1)

Scientific classification
- Kingdom: Animalia
- Phylum: Chordata
- Class: Actinopterygii
- Order: Cypriniformes
- Family: Leuciscidae
- Genus: Oreoleuciscus
- Species: O. potanini

Binomial name
- Oreoleuciscus potanini (Kessler, 1879)

Synonyms
- Oreoleuciscus gracilis Warpachowski, 1889; Oreoleuciscus herzensteini Warpachowski, 1889; Oreoleuciscus potanini var. recurviceps Warpachowski, 1889; Oreoleuciscus similis Warpachowski, 1889; Oreoleuciscus ignatowi Nikolskii, 1902

Species of fish

Oreoleuciscus potanini, the Altai osman, is a species of freshwater ray-finned fish belonging to the family Leuciscidae, which contains the daces, chubs, true minnows and related species. It inhabits Mongolia and Tuva, Russia, in freshwater rivers and lakes with temperatures of between 10 and 20 °C (50 and 68 °F). It has a maximum length of 100 centimetres (39 in), a common length of 75 centimetres (30 in), a maximum published weight of 10.0 kilograms (22.0 lb) and a maximum published age of 40 years. It is considered harmless to humans.
