= Airag Lake =

Lake in Zavkhan, Uvs, Mongolia

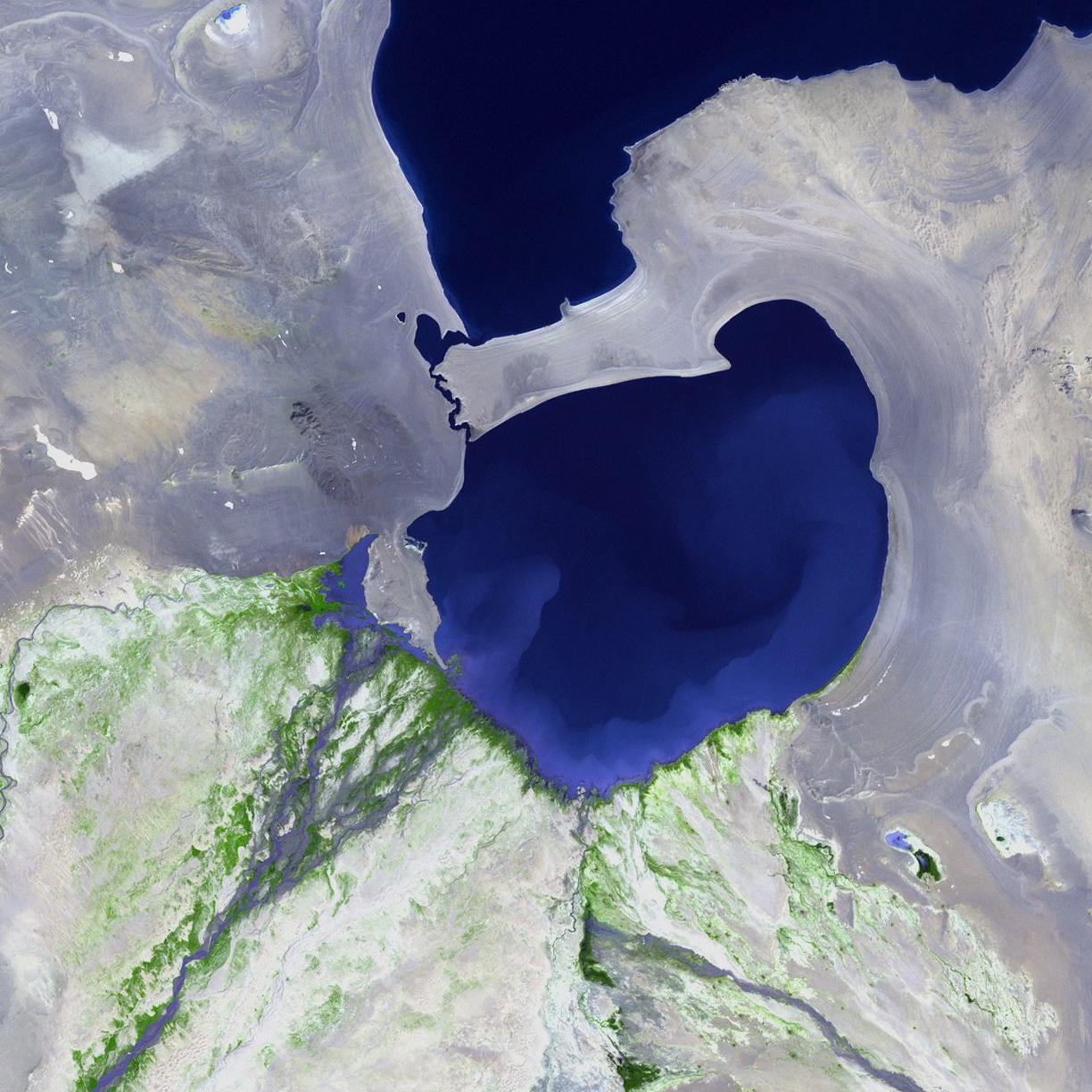
- Satellite image taken from Landsat-7.

- Location within Mongolia
- Location: Uvs aimag, Mongolia
- Coordinates: 48°53′N 93°25′E
- Lake type: freshwater
- Primary inflows: Zavkhan River, Khüngüin River
- Primary outflows: Khyargas Lake
- Basin countries: Mongolia, Russia
- Max. length: 18 km (11 mi)
- Max. width: 13 km (8.1 mi)
- Surface area: 143.3 km^{2} (55.3 sq mi)
- Average depth: 5.7 m (19 ft)
- Max. depth: 10 m (33 ft)
- Water volume: 819.6 m^{3} (28,940 cu ft)
- Surface elevation: 1,030 m (3,380 ft)

Ramsar Wetland
- Official name: Ayrag Nuur
- Designated: 13 April 1999
- Reference no.: 977

Airag Lake (Mongolia)

Airag Lake (Note: Mongolian: Айраг нуур, romanized: Airag nuur, pronounced [ɛ́ːrə̆q nʊːr]; Classical Mongolian: ᠠᠶᠢᠷᠠᠭ ᠨᠠᠭᠤᠷ [ˈaɪrək ˈnʊːr]) is a lake in Zavkhan, Uvs Province, Mongolia in the Great Lakes Depression. It is in a system of the interconnected lakes: Khar-Us, Khar, Dörgön, and Khyargas.

The lake was in the same basin as the Khyargas Lake in ancient times.

The depth of the lake generally varies with the inflow river flow. The lake flows into Khyargas Lake along a 5 km long, 200–300 m wide canal, which does not freeze in winter.

During the summer the lake warms up almost to the very bottom. Even in winter, the temperature remains fairly constant, 1 - 2.5 °C. Compared to other lakes, the water is not very clear.
