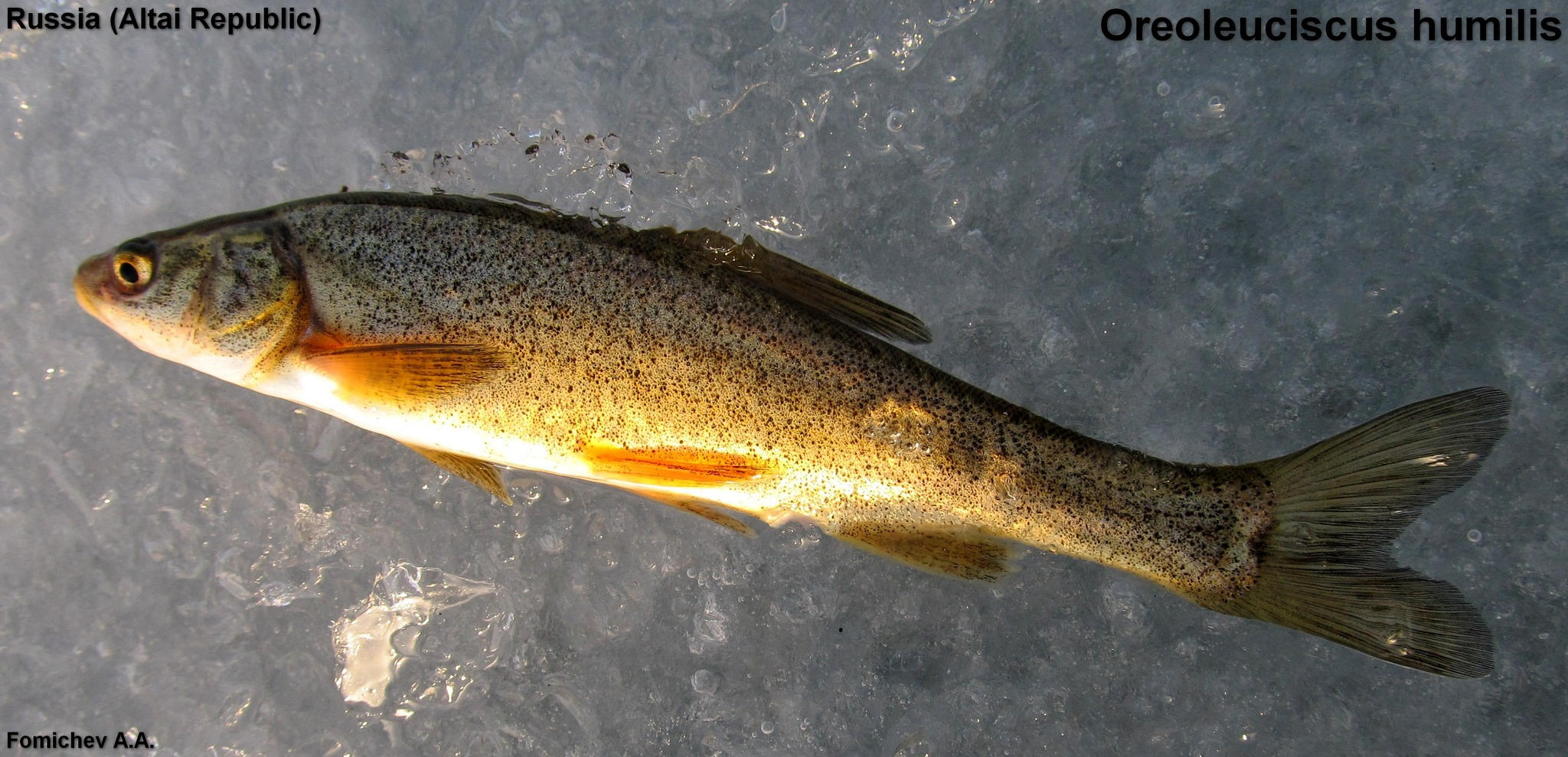

Conservation status
- Least Concern (IUCN 3.1)

Scientific classification
- Kingdom: Animalia
- Phylum: Chordata
- Class: Actinopterygii
- Order: Cypriniformes
- Family: Leuciscidae
- Genus: Oreoleuciscus
- Species: O. humilis

Binomial name
- Oreoleuciscus humilis Warpachowski, 1889

= Oreoleuciscus humilis =

Species of fish

Oreoleuciscus humilis, the dwarf Altai osman, is a species of freshwater ray-finned fish belonging to the family Leuciscidae, which contains the daces, chubs, true minnows and related species. This species is found in Tuva, Russia, and western Mongolia. The maximum standard length of this species is 20 cm (7.9 in), its maximum published wight is 25 g (0.88 oz) and a maximum age of 15 years.
