= Nömrög =

District in Zavkhan Province, Mongolia

Coordinates: 48°52′24″N 96°57′41″E

Nömrög District Нөмрөг сум ᠨᠥᠮᠦᠷᠭᠡᠰᠤᠮᠤ
- District
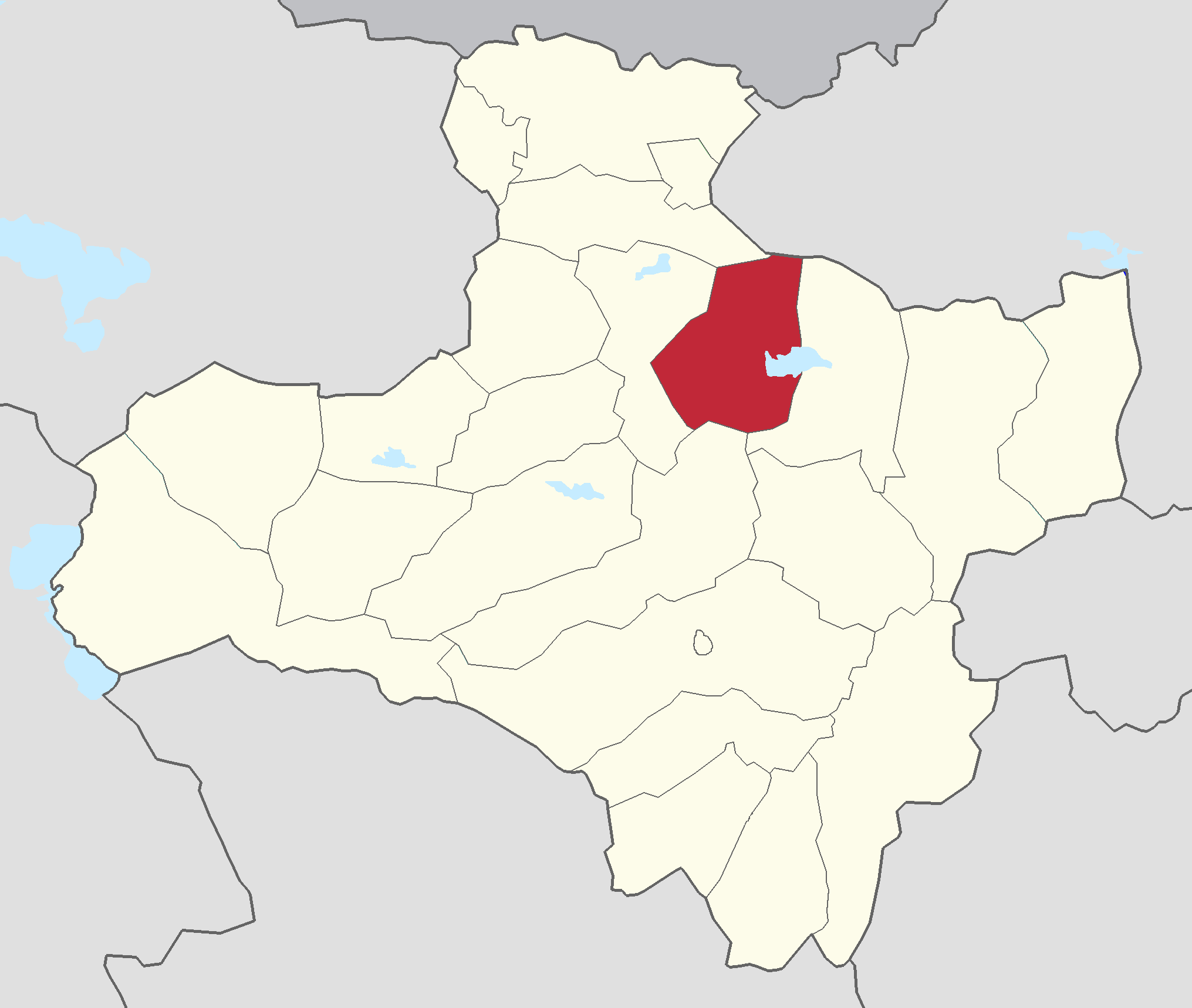
- Country: Mongolia
- Province: Zavkhan Province
- Time zone: UTC+8 (UTC + 8)
- Climate: Dwc

Numrug (Mongolian: Нөмрөг, Cover) is a sum of Zavkhan Province in western Mongolia. In 2005, its population was 1,848.

== Geology ==
- Telmen Lake

== Administrative divisions ==
The district is divided into five bags, which are:

- Bayanzurkh
- Darkhan-Uul
- Khairkhan
- Khudrug
- Nuur
