= Erdenekhairkhan, Zavkhan =

District in Zavkhan Province, Mongolia

Coordinates: 48°07′27″N 95°43′03″E

Erdenekhairkhan District Эрдэнэхайрхан сум ᠡᠷᠳᠡᠨᠢᠬᠠᠶᠢᠷᠬᠠᠨᠰᠤᠮᠤ
- District
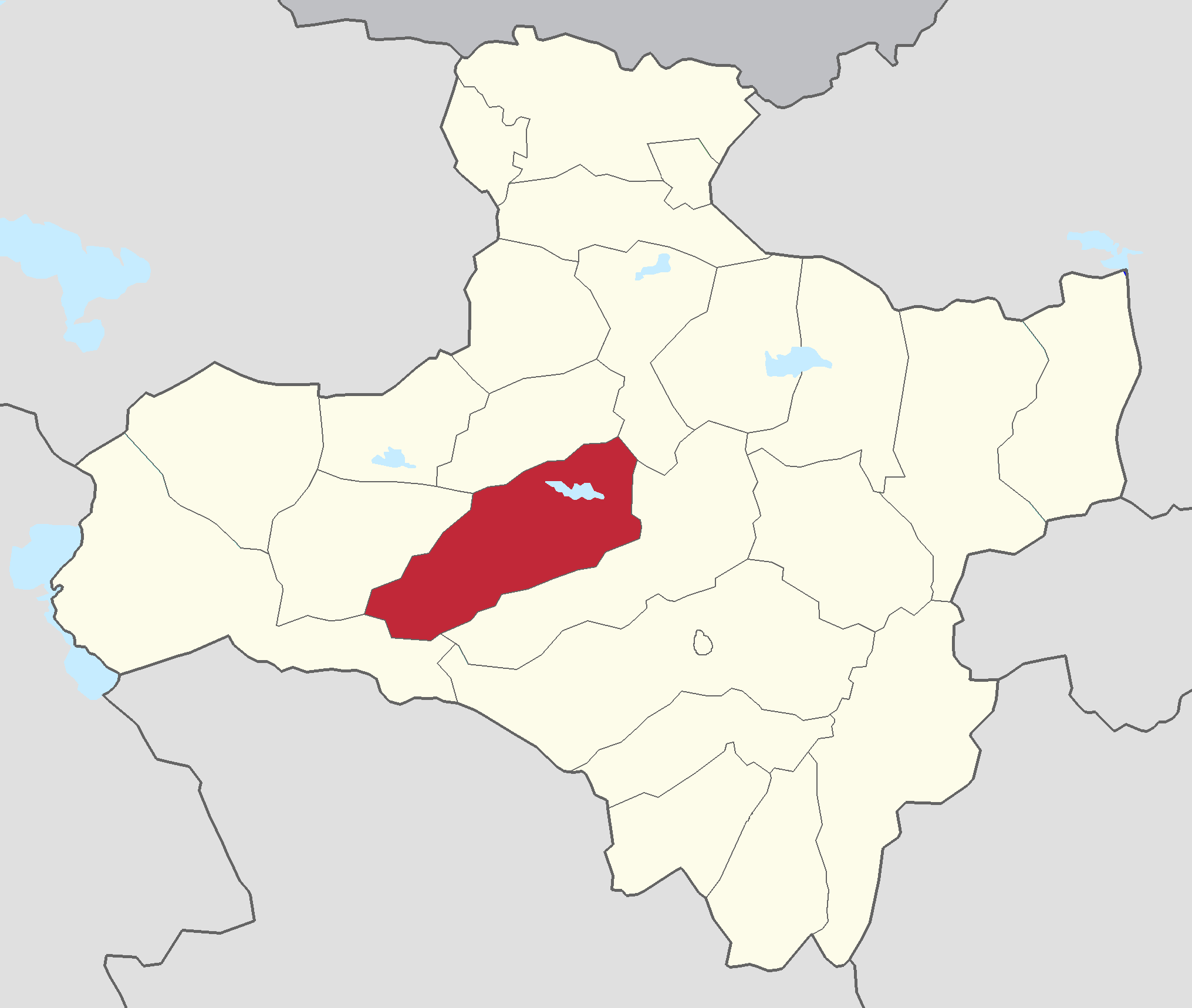
- Country: Mongolia
- Province: Zavkhan Province
- Time zone: UTC+8 (UTC + 8)
- Climate: BSk

Erdenekhairkhan (Mongolian: Эрдэнэхайрхан, lit. 'Jewel Mountain') is a district of Zavkhan Province in western Mongolia. The district centre is 13 km south of Goliin Ekh (Mongolian: Голийн эх, lit. 'River Source'), the source of Elsiin River (Mongolian: Элсийн гол, lit. 'Sandy River') running to the Airag Lake. In 2005, its population was 1,771.

== Geology ==
- Khar Lake

== Administrative divisions ==
The district is divided into five bags, which are:

- Baganuur
- Bayanzurkh
- Altan
- Musun
- Khairkhan
