= Munkhkhairkhan National Park =

National park in Mongolia

- Mongolian: Мөнххайрхан
- IUCN category II (national park)
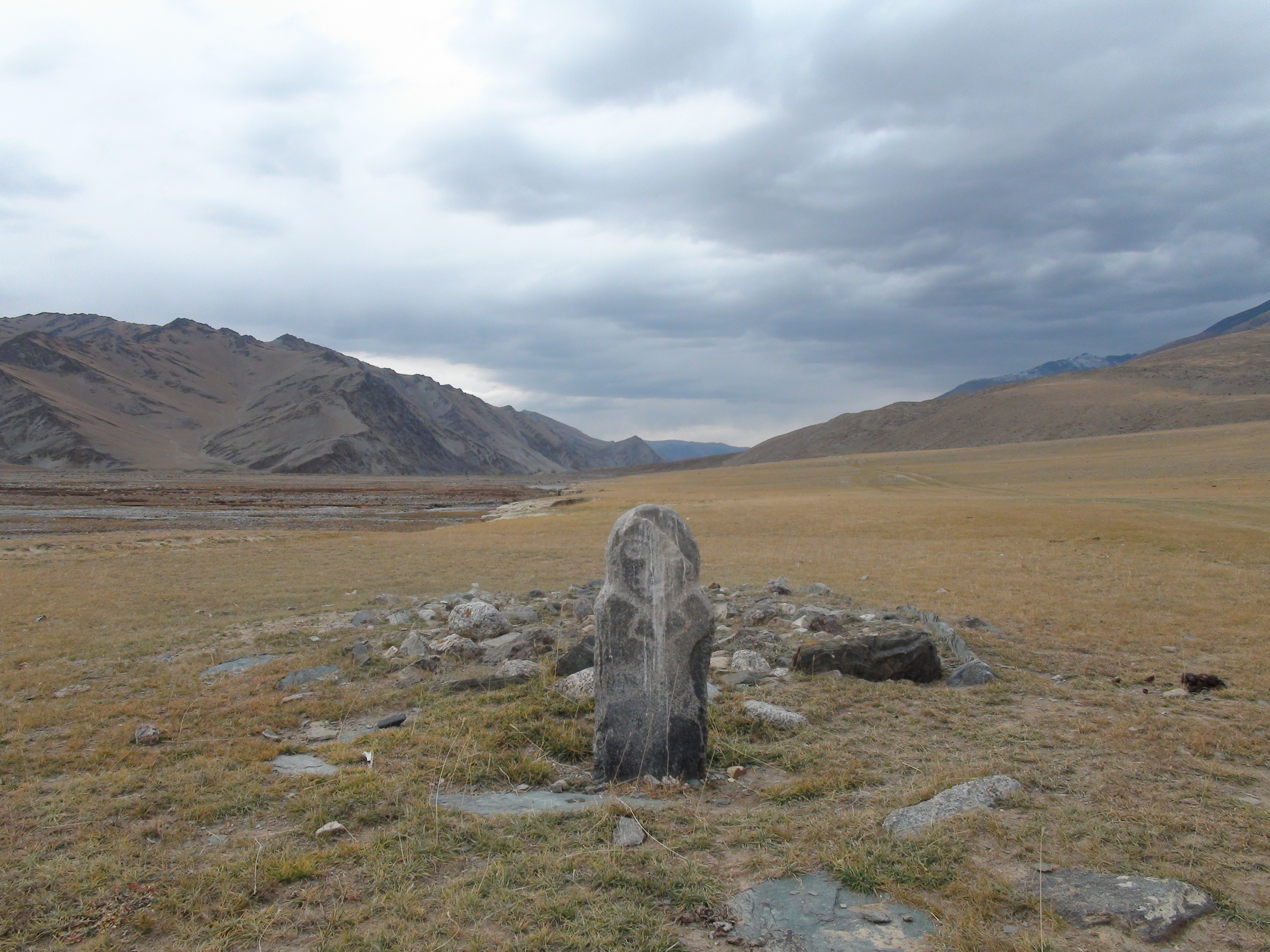
- Balbal at Munkh-Khairkhan

- Location within Mongolia
- Location: Bayan-Ölgii Province and Khovd Province, Mongolia
- Coordinates: 47°N 92.5°E
- Area: 5,061 square kilometres (1,954 sq mi)
- Established: 2011
- Governing body: Ministry of Environment and Green Development of Mongolia

Munkhkhairkhan National Park (Mongolian: Мөнххайрхан) is centered on Mönkhkhairkhan Mountain, the second highest mountain in Mongolia. The park straddles Bayan-Ölgii Province and Khovd Province in the Mongol-Altai Mountains of western Mongolia, 15 km from the border with China.

== Topography ==
The park's area runs for 90 kilometres (56 mi) northwest-to-southeast along the ridge of the mountain, with a width of 30 km that takes in rivers and lakes in the adjoining valleys. Munkh Kharirkhan's highest peak, Noyon, rises to an elevation of 4,362 meters (14,311 ft) in the Mongol-Altai Range of the Altai Mountains. The mountain features glaciers and snowfields, with glacial activity leaving steep slopes of rock and gravel.

== Climate and ecoregion ==
The climate of the area is Cold semi-arid climate (Köppen climate classification (BSk)). This climate is characteristic of steppe climates intermediary between desert and humid climates, and typically have precipitation is above evapotranspiration. At least one month averages below 0 °C (32 °F). Precipitation in the Munkhkhairkhan region averages 76 – 158 mm/year.

== Flora and fauna ==
The valleys and low foothills area covered with shrubs, sagebrush and other dry steppe vegetation. Higher elevations support mountain meadows with grasses such as Koeleria. The park reports 15 square kilometers of Larch forest along the rivers in the lowest valleys.

== See also ==
- List of national parks of Mongolia
