= Great Lakes Depression =

Semi-arid depression in Mongolia

- Depression
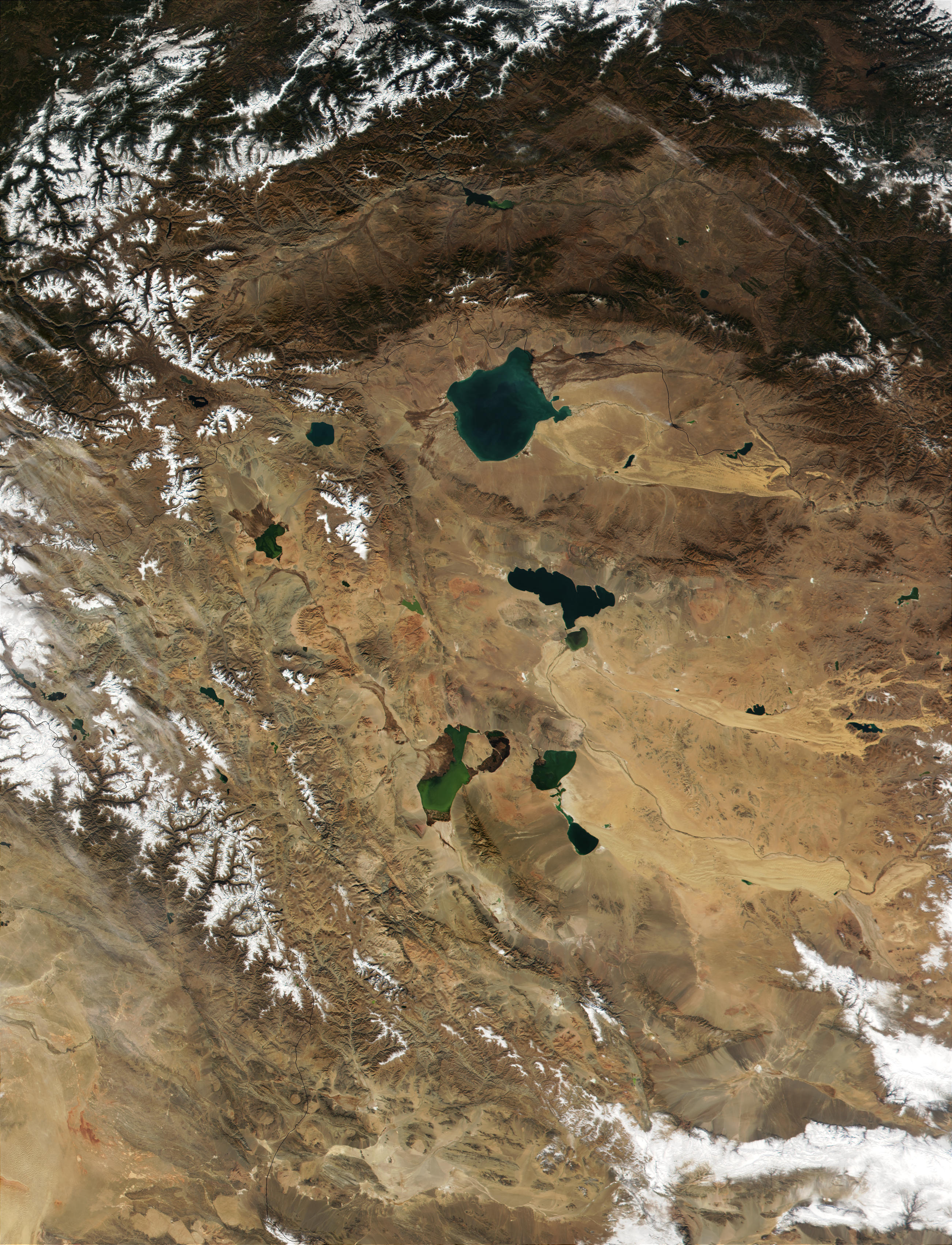
- Great Lakes Depression view from space.

- Location within Mongolia Location within Russia
- Coordinates: 49°18′39″N 92°38′15″E

Area
  - Total: 100,000 km^{2} (39,000 mi^{2})

The Great Lakes Depression, (Note: Mongolian: Их нууруудын хотгор, romanized: Ikh Nuuruudiin khotgor, pronounced [ix nʊˑrʊ́ˑtiɴ χɔ́tʰχɞr̥]) also called the Great Lakes Hollow, is a large semi-arid depression in Mongolia that covers parts of the Uvs, Khovd, Bayan-Ölgii, Zavkhan and Govi-Altai provinces. Bounded by the Altai in the West, Khangai in the East and Tannu-Ola Mountains in the North, it covers the area of over 100,000 km^{2} (39,000 mi^{2}) with elevations from 750 to 2,000 m (2,460–6,560 ft).

Small northern parts of the depression are part of Russia.

The depression is named so because it contains six major Mongolian lakes: saline Uvs Lake, Khyargas Lake and Dörgön Lake; and freshwater Khar-Us Lake, Khar Lake and Airag Lake, as well as a number of smaller ones. In addition, it includes 14,000 km^{2} (5,400 mi^{2}) of solonchaks and large sandy areas. Northern parts are dominated by arid steppes, and southern by semideserts or deserts. The major rivers are Khovd River, Zavkhan River, and Tes River.

== Ecology ==
The depression is a major freshwater basin of Mongolia and contains important wetlands of Central Asia. The wetlands are based on the system of interconnected shallow lakes with wide reed belts within a generally desert steppe. The wetlands support a number of rare migrating birds: Eurasian spoonbill (Platalea leucorodia), black stork (Ciconia nigra), osprey (Pandion haliaetus), white-tailed eagle (Haliaeetus albicilla), swan goose (Cygnopsis cygnoides), and bar-headed goose (Anser indicus). Only a few individuals of great white pelican (Pelecanus onocrotalus) remain in the Great Lakes Basin in Mongolia. They nest in catchment areas of rivers and lakes that have abundant fish and vegetation.

Although the total number of fish species in the region is low, a large percentage of those that do occur are endemic or near-endemic, especially from the genera Oreoleuciscus (Altai osmans), Thymallus (graylings) and Triplophysa (a stone loach genus).
