= Khyargas, Uvs =

District in Uvs Province, Mongolia

Khyargas District Хяргас сум ᠬᠢᠷᠭᠢᠰ ᠰᠤᠮᠤ
- District
- Interactive map of Khyargas District
- Country: Mongolia
- Province: Uvs Province
- Time zone: UTC+7 (UTC + 7)

Khyargas (Mongolian: Хяргас [χʲɛ́rʁəs]) is a district of Uvs Province in western Mongolia.

The sum is named after Khyargas lake, which is 80 km south of the sum center.

The sum center was formerly located at another site, 49°32′51″N 93°49′36″E.

== Administrative divisions ==
The district is divided into four bags, which are:

- Bugat
- Delger
- Khairkhan
- Khangai

== Notable natives ==
- Jambyn Batmönkh, the 12th prime minister of Mongolia
- Sürengiin Möömöö, linguist and chess player
