= Dalain Modon Khüis =

Island in Lake Khövsgöl, Mongolia

Native name: Далайн Модон Хүйс
- Interactive map of Dalain Modon Khüis

Geography
- Coordinates: 50.978306°N 100.506472°E
- Area: 7 km^{2} (2.7 sq mi)
- Length: 3 km (1.9 mi)
- Width: 2 km (1.2 mi)
- Highest elevation: 174 m (571 ft)

Demographics
- Population: 0

Dalain Modon Khüis (Mongolian: Далайн-Модон-Хүйс, romanized: Dalain-Modon-Khüis, lit. 'Forest navel in the sea'), sometimes called Wooden Boy Island, is a lake island in Lake Khövsgöl, Khövsgöl Province, Mongolia. Measuring roughly 3 km east-west and 2 km north-south with an area of about 7 km² and a perimeter of roughly 9.25 km, it is roughly equidistant from Khankh (70 km north) and Khatgal (65 km south), about 10–15 km from the lake's shores.

== Name and etymology ==
The island's native Mongolian name, Mongolian: Далайн-Модон-Хүйс (Dalain Modon Khüis), literally translates to "Forest navel in the sea" (dalai meaning sea/ocean, modon meaning wooden/forest, and khüis meaning navel or umbilical cord). According to author Sergey Volkov, the name "Wooden Boy Island" originated as a mistranslation on Google Maps and the English-language Wikipedia; however, in a 2009 English-language rendering of the island's legendary origin story, the sheared-off mountain peak supposedly thrust into Lake Khövsgöl is called "Wooden Boy Mountain".

== Geography and geology ==
View of Dalain Modon Khüis taken during ISS Expedition 14.

The island is the summit of an ancient volcano rising 174 m above the surface of Lake Khövsgöl, reaching an absolute elevation of 1,819 m above sea level. It has an area of approximately 7 km² and is situated near the deepest point of Lake Khövsgöl (262 m). Its northern, western, and southern shores consist of steep rocky cliffs plunging nearly 200 m underwater, whereas its eastern shore features a 200 m pebble-and-boulder spit that forms a small lagoon and sandy beach.

The island is uninhabited and mostly covered by dense larch and deciduous forest, but it also contains rare Siberian pine (kedrach).

== History and cartography ==
The earliest known written description of the lake is from Russian records dating to 1673, when Stepan Vasilyevich Polyakov, a dragoon captain from Selenginsk, described the lake and recorded it in Russian as Lake Khövsgöl. The lake later appeared in Semyon Remezov’s 1701 Drawing Book of Siberia (Russian: Чертежная книга Сибири), although the accompanying map did not illustrate the island. A short-lived Russian wooden fort, Kosogolsky Ostrog, was constructed near the lake, operating from 1717 to 1718.

Border disputes between Russia and the Qing dynasty concluded with the Treaty of Kyakhta in 1727, which delineated the boundary between the two empires in the region. Under this treaty, the broader Lake Khövsgöl region was held within Qing territory. Russian cartographers labeled the island Buldak (Russian: Булдак) on the 1727 border map associated with the treaty; it also appears on Russian maps of 1806 and 1825.

Local accounts recorded by Sergey Volkov note that Buddhist lamas established a small wooden hermitage (skete) on the island's southern part in 1921. Out of reverence for the sacred lake and island, visitors tied buckets behind the horses when crossing the ice to prevent droppings from polluting the ice, and elderly lamas were carried on litters to a sacred cave (~24 m²) on the northern part of the island. In 1986, after a helicopter landed on the island for a prayer service, an unextinguished campfire sparked a forest fire that destroyed the wooden hermitage.

A local story claimed a column of 200 Soviet armored vehicles fell through the winter ice near the island in the 1970s. However, Irkutsk researcher Rudolf Kavchik later determined that in reality, a single ZIL-131 engineering truck sank there without any casualties.

Khövsgöl Lake National Park was established in 1992.

== Culture and folklore ==
The island is home to various shamanic sites such as ovoos, spirit houses, and secret burial sites of the Darkhad people.

There are two legends behind the origin of the island. In Years of Search in Asia (Годы исканий в Азии, 1973), geographer Eduard Murzaev recorded a Mongolian origin legend in which a giant hero plugged a catastrophic gushing spring with a massive boulder to stop a flood; the accumulated water became Lake Khövsgöl and the boulder became Dalain Modon Khüis Island. The other Mongolian legend describes a thumb-sized boy found on a dry lakebed by an old woman; after a flood ensues, the grown hero slays a man-eater and buries him beneath a sheared-off mountain peak (forming the island, opposite the flat-topped volcano Uran-Dush-Uul / "Anvil Mountain" on the western shore), while the old woman dives underwater to plug the spring with a rock.

== Paleoclimate ==
Sediment cores retrieved in the early 2000s by the joint international Hövsgöl Drilling Project confirmed that Lake Khövsgöl's water level fluctuated dramatically, dropping by about 100 m or more during the Last Glacial Maximum before refilling.
