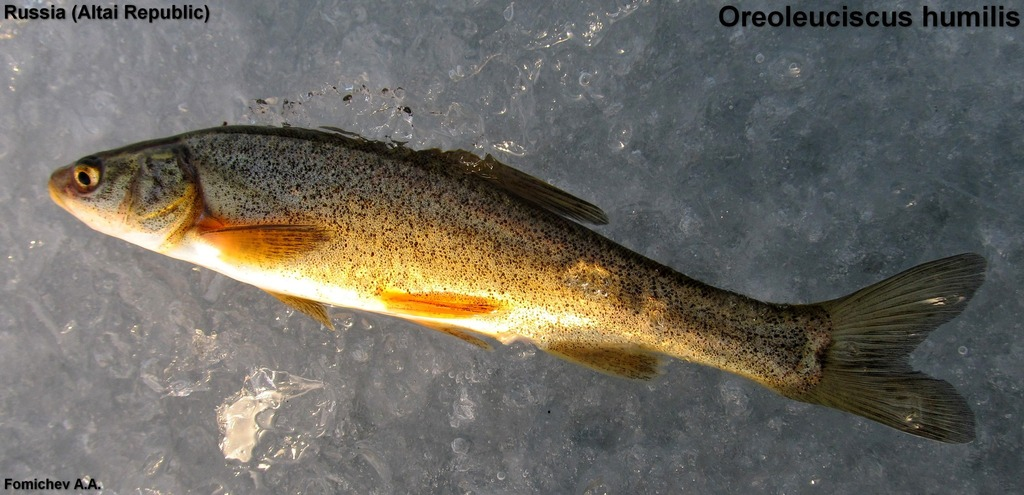
- Dwarf Altai osman (Oreoleuciscus humilis)

Scientific classification
- Kingdom: Animalia
- Phylum: Chordata
- Class: Actinopterygii
- Order: Cypriniformes
- Family: Leuciscidae
- Subfamily: Pseudaspininae
- Genus: Oreoleuciscus; Warpachowski, 1889

Type species
- Chondrostoma potanini Kessler, 1879

Synonyms
- Acanthorutilus Berg, 1912

= Oreoleuciscus =

Genus of fishes

Oreoleuciscus is a genus of freshwater ray-finned fishes belonging to the family Leuciscidae, which includes the daces, chubs and true minnows. These are medium to large sized fishes which are only found in Mongolia and adjacent parts of Russia. They are known as osmans.

== Taxonomy ==
Oreoleucuscus was first proposed as a genus in 1889 by the Russian zoologist Nikolai Arkadewich Warpachowski (Russian: Варпаховский) with Chondrostoma potanini designated as its type species in 1912 by Lev Berg. C. potanini had originally been described by Karl Kessler in 1879 with its type locality given as Dayan Lake in Mongolia. This genus is classified within the subfamily Pseudaspininae of the family Leuciscidae.

== Species ==
These are the currently recognized species in this genus:

- Oreoleuciscus angusticephalus Bogutskaya, 2001 (Narrow-headed Altai osman)
- Oreoleuciscus dsapchynensis Warpachowski, 1889
- Oreoleuciscus humilis Warpachowski, 1889 (Dwarf Altai osman)
- Oreoleuciscus potanini (Kessler, 1879) (Altai osman)
