= Telmen Lake =

Lake in Zavkhan Province, Mongolia

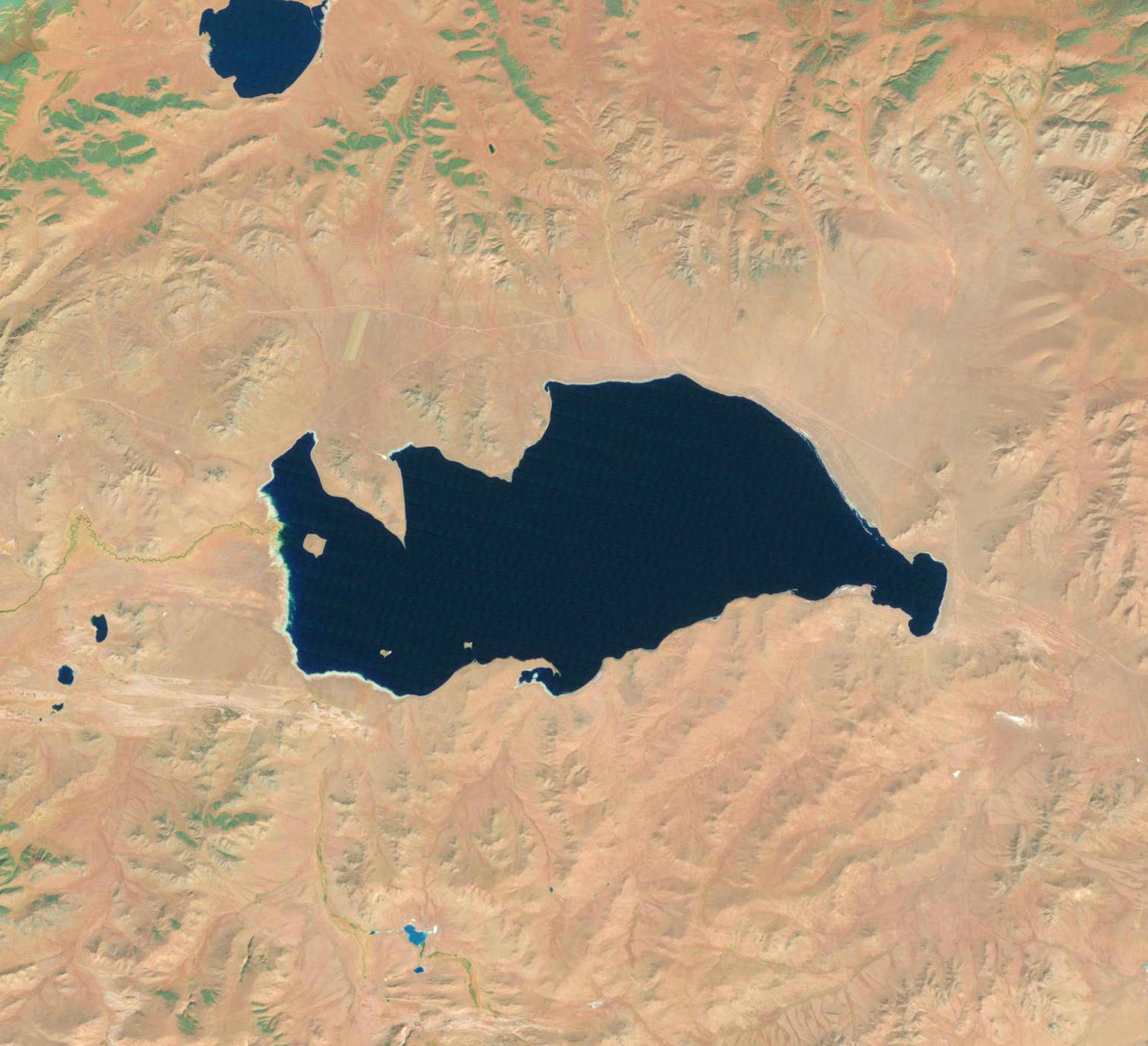
- Telmen Lake satellite view

- Location within Mongolia
- Location: Zavkhan Province
- Coordinates: 48°50′N 97°19′E
- Basin countries: Mongolia
- Max. length: 28 km (17 mi)
- Max. width: 16 km (9.9 mi)
- Surface area: 194 km^{2} (75 sq mi)
- Max. depth: 27 m (89 ft)
- Water volume: 2.671 km^{3} (2,165,000 acre⋅ft)
- Surface elevation: 1,789 m (5,869 ft)

Telmen Lake (Mongolian: Тэлмэн нуур) is a saltwater lake in Zavkhan Province, Mongolia. It is located in both the Nömrög and Telmen districts. Three islands are located in the lake, which is a gathering point for migratory birds. The lake has been designated an Important Bird Area by BirdLife International. It is noted as a site for Birdwatching.

Average temperature ranges from -32 °C in January to 12 °C in July. From 6,210 to 3,960 years ago, as determined by radiocarbon dating, Lake Telmen was between 15 and 20m shallower than it is at present. The lake has a salinity level of 6.49–7.61%.
