= Zavkhan River =

River in Mongolia

Coordinates: 48°51′22″N 93°20′40″E

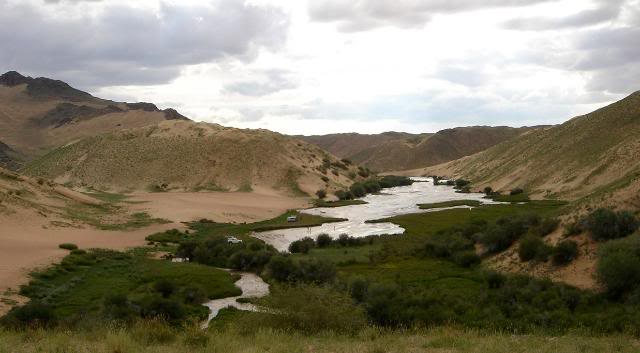
- Native name: Завхан гол (Mongolian)

Location
- Country: Mongolia
- Aimags: Zavkhan, Govi-Altai

Physical characteristics
- Source: Buyant River
  - location: Khangai Mountains
- 2nd source: Shar-Us River
- Mouth: Khyargas Lake in Great Lakes Depression
  - location: Khyargas, Uvs, Mongolia
- Length: 670 km (420 mi)

Basin features
- Tributaries
  - right: Shurga River

Zavkhan River (Mongolian: Завхан гол, IPA: [t͡sáʊχəɴ ɢɔɮ]) is a river in Mongolia that flows from the Khangai Mountains into Lake Khyargas, and has a draining area of over 77,840 square kilometres (30,050 mi^{2}). The river forms most of the border between the Govi-Altai and Zavkhan aimags. The length of the river is 670 kilometres (420 mi).

During the Mongol Empire, it appears to have been the territory of the family of Möngke Khan, and Jami' al-tawarikh mention that Mongke's son, Ürüng tash, was in a river called Zavkhan mörön.

== See also ==
- List of rivers of Mongolia
