= Bayan Lake =

Lake in Santmargats, Zavkhan, Mongolia

- Mongolian: Баян нуур ᠪᠠᠶ᠋ᠠᠨ ᠨᠠᠭᠤᠷ
- Location within Mongolia
- Location: Santmargats, Zavkhan, Mongolia
- Coordinates: 48.456°N 95.118°E
- Type: lake

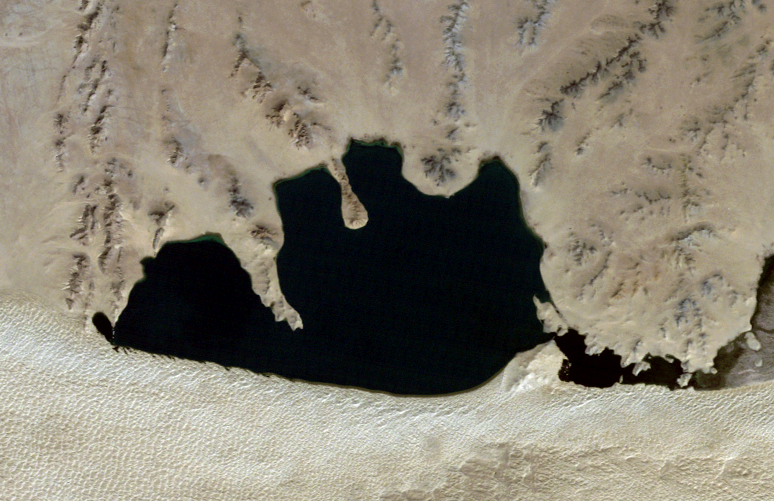

Bayan Lake (Mongolian: Баян нуур, Mongolian: rich lake) is a lake in Santmargats, Zavkhan Province, Mongolia.
