= Khar Lake (Khovd) =

Lake in Khovd Province, Mongolia

- ᠬᠠᠷ᠎ᠠᠨᠠᠭᠤᠷ (Mongolian)
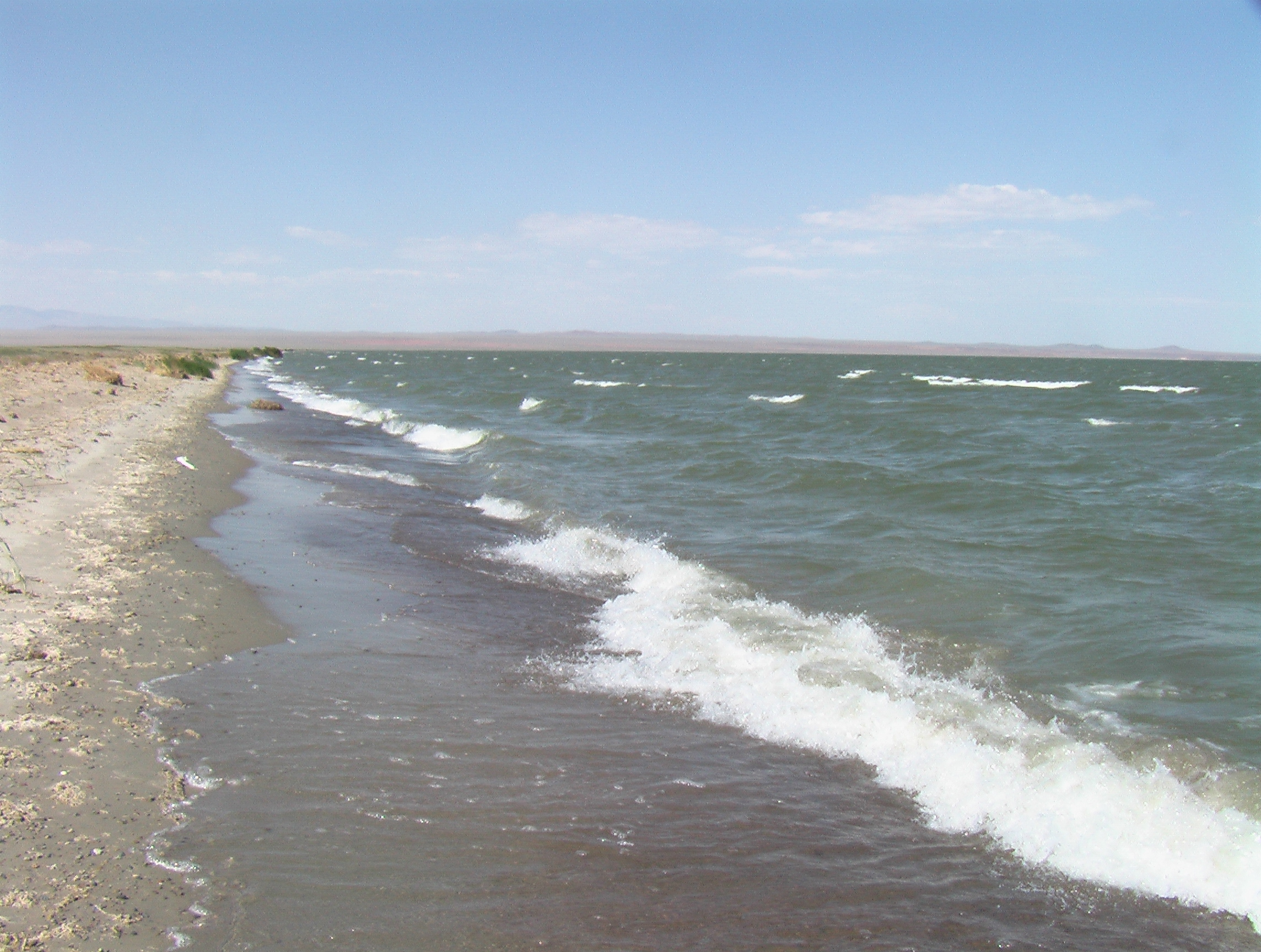
- The western shore of Khar Nuur

- Location within Mongolia
- Location: Great Lakes Depression, Western Mongolia
- Coordinates: 48.08°N 93.2°E
- Lake type: eutrophic
- Primary inflows: Chono Kharaikh Gol
- Primary outflows: Teeliin Gol
- Catchment area: 76,800 km^{2} (29,700 sq mi)
- Basin countries: Mongolia, Russia
- Max. length: 37 km (23 mi)
- Max. width: 24 km (15 mi)
- Surface area: 575 km^{2} (222 sq mi)
- Average depth: 4.2 m (14 ft)
- Max. depth: 7 m (23 ft)
- Water volume: 2.422 km^{3} (0.581 cu mi)
- Residence time: 1.7 years
- Surface elevation: 1,132.3 m (3,715 ft)
- Frozen: December - April

Khar Lake (Mongolian: Хар нуур; lit. 'Black Lake') is located in Khovd Province in western Mongolia's Great Lakes Depression.

== Name ==
It is also known as Ha-la Hu, Hara Nuur, Har Nuur, Khara Nur, Khar Nuur, and Ozero Kara-Nor

It should be distinguished from the similarly named Khar Lake (Zavkhan), another lake further east in Mongolia.

== Description ==
It is part of a group of lakes that were once part of a larger prehistoric lake that disappeared 5,000 years ago as the region became drier.

Some sources are using different Khar Lake statistics values:

- Water level: 1,134.08 m
- Surface area: 565.2 km²
- Average depth: 4.14 m
- Volume: 2.34 km^{3}.

=== Water Balance ===
Water balance of Khar Lake (Unit of water balance: mm/year)
Surface input		Surface output		Groundwater inflow- outflow	Retention time, years
Precipitation	Inflow	Evaporation	Outflow	Groundwater inflow- outflow	Retention time, years
54.0	1,786.9	1,117.8	1,287.9	+564.8	1.7

Khar Lake has a single inflow - Chono Kharaikh Gol river, which creates a river delta.

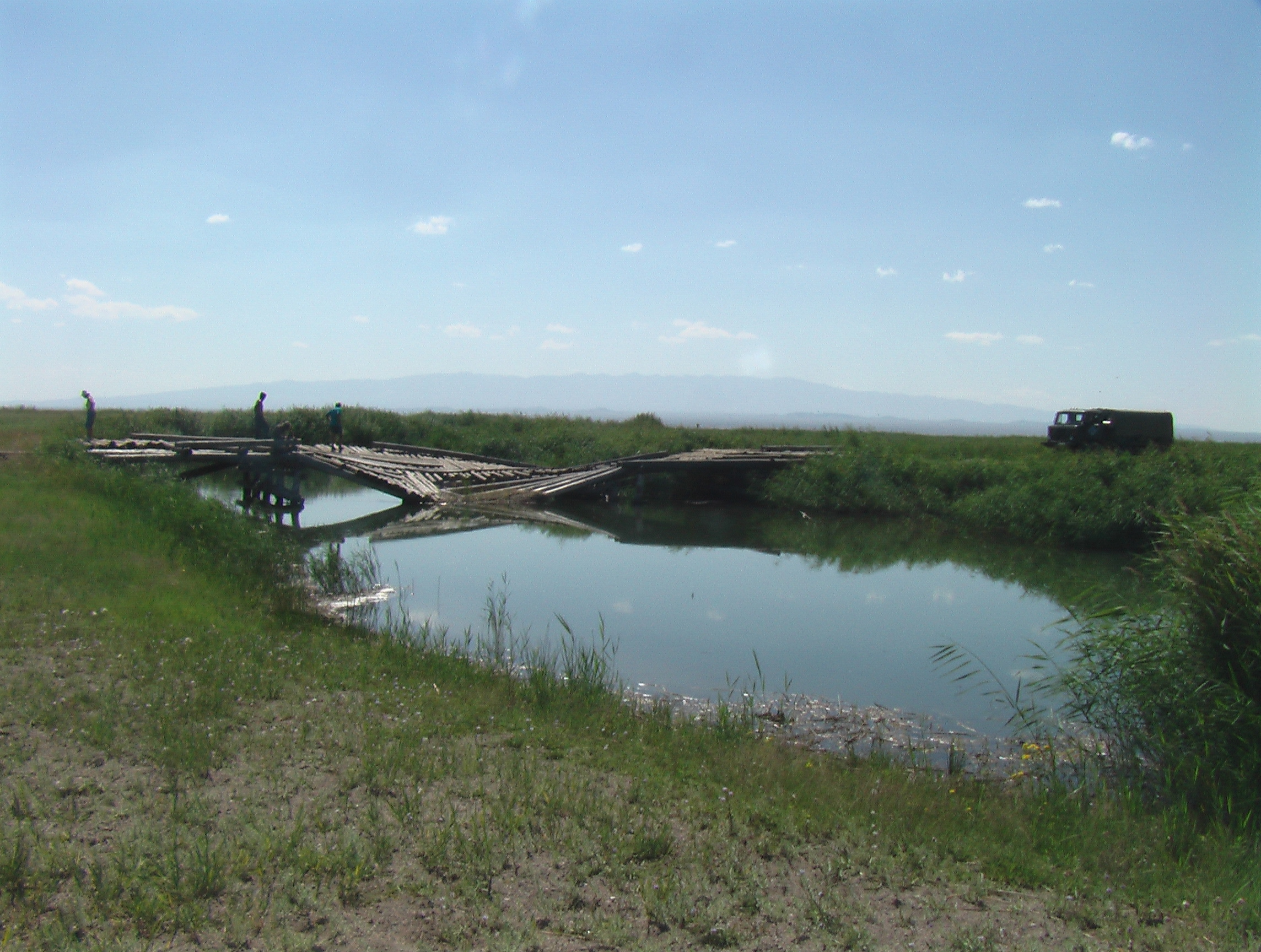
Natural channel from Khar Lake to Dörgön Lake

Khar Lake has a connection to Dörgön Nuur south of it.
