= Dörgön Lake =

Lake in Khovd Province, Mongolia

- ᠳᠥᠷᠦᠭᠡᠨᠨᠠᠭᠤᠷ (Mongolian)
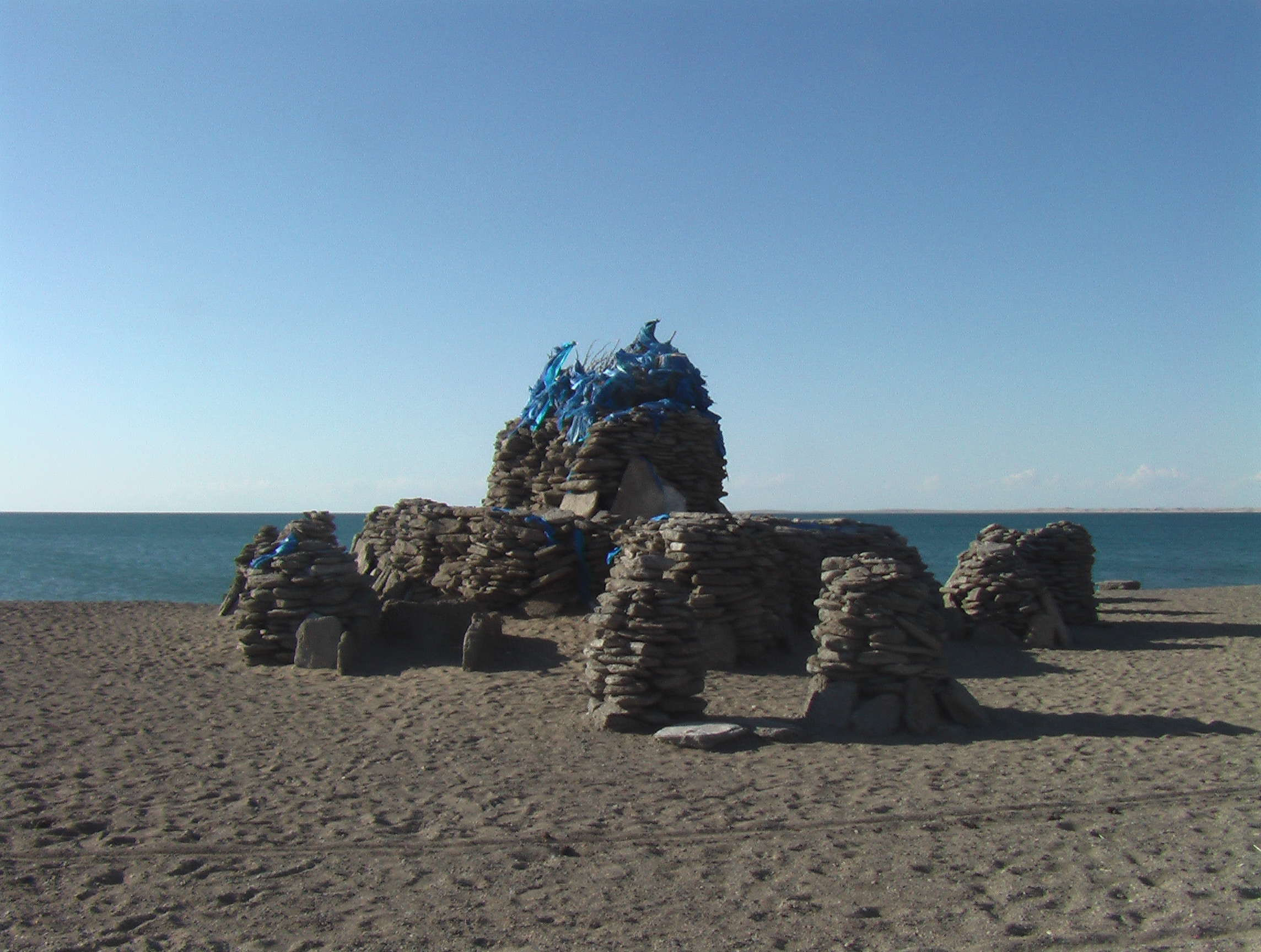
- Ovoo at the southern shore

- Location within Mongolia

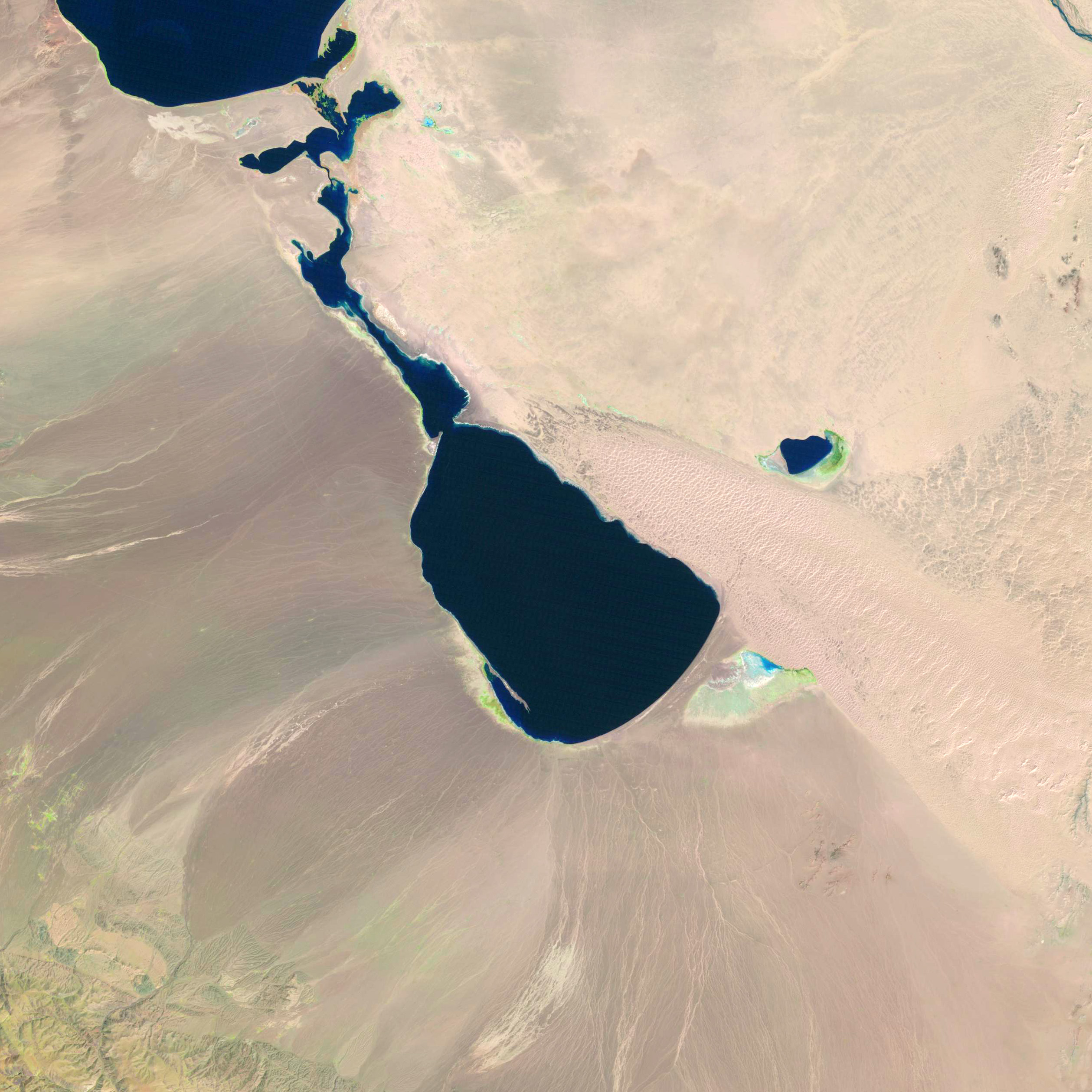
- Landsat image
- Location: Khovd Province
- Coordinates: 47°42′N 93°25′E
- Primary inflows: Khar Lake, Khomyn Khooloi (Khomyn Canal)
- Basin countries: Mongolia
- Max. width: 18 km (11 mi)
- Surface area: 305 km^{2} (118 sq mi)
- Average depth: 14.3 m (47 ft)
- Water volume: 4,367 km^{3} (3.540×10^{9} acre⋅ft)
- Surface elevation: 1,132 m (3,714 ft)

Dörgön Lake (Mongolian: Дөргөн нуур) is a saltwater lake in Khovd Province, Mongolia. It is a part of the Great Lakes Depression, being one of the remnants of a prehistoric lake. It has a salinity of 4%.

== Geology ==
The lake has a total area of 305 km^{2}.
