= Khar Lake (Zavkhan) =

Lake in Erdenekhairkhan, Zavkhan, Mongolia

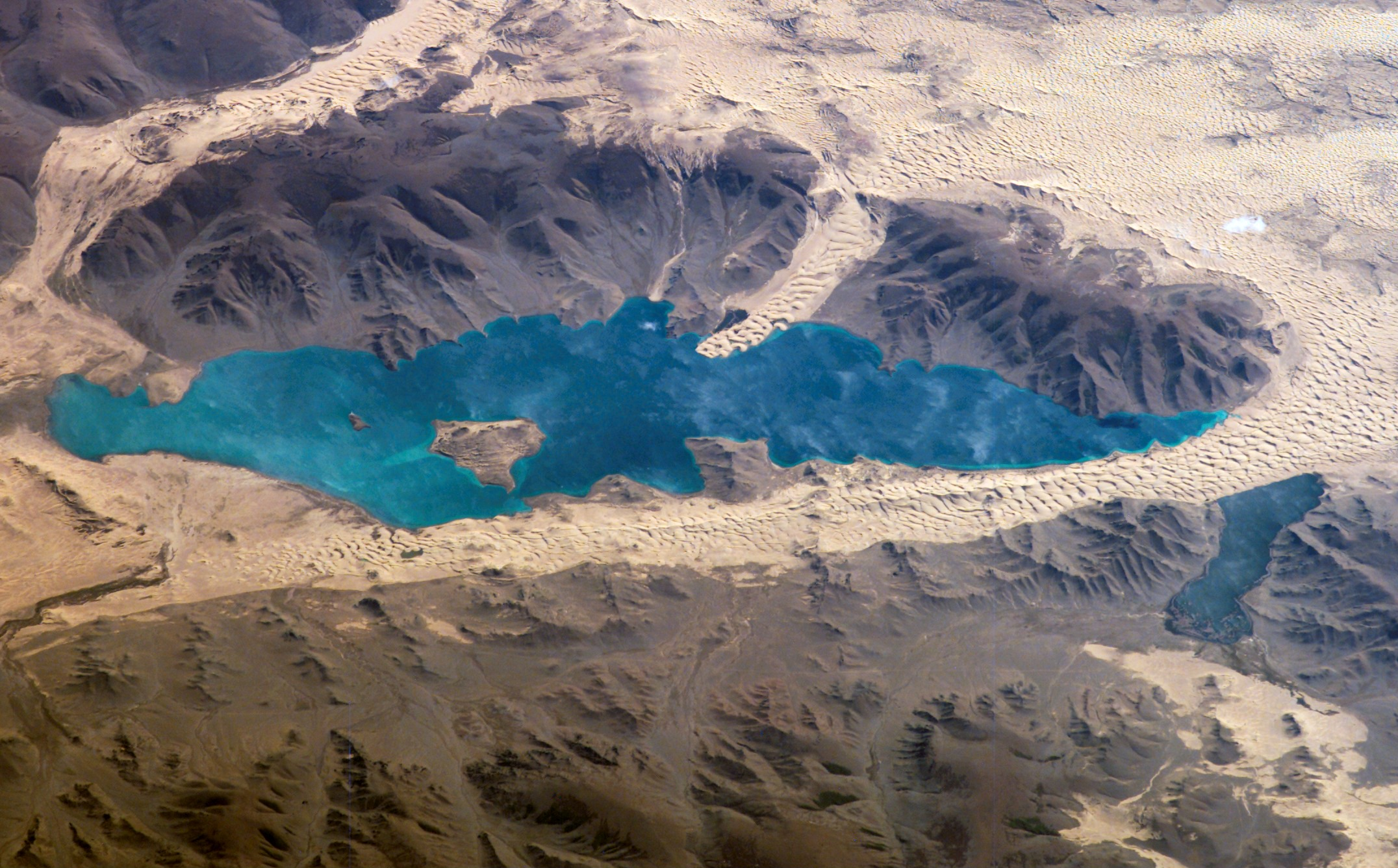
- Image made from ISS, south on top, 2006-09-07

- Location within Mongolia
- Location: Erdenekhairkhan, Zavkhan, Mongolia
- Coordinates: 48.35°N 96.1°E
- Basin countries: Mongolia
- Surface elevation: 1,980 m (6,496 ft)

Khar Lake (Mongolian: Хар нуур, romanized: Khar nuur; lit. 'Black Lake') is a lake in Erdenekhairkhan, Zavkhan Province, Mongolia. Khar Lake occupies a dale in the Khangai Mountains to the East from the Great Lakes Depression.

The Tovkhosh Mountains are on the western shore.

In the lake are 2 islands, one small, one big. They are called "Small and Big Avgash" (Ikh and Baga Avgash). Big Avgash is sandy and hosts roe deer during their rebirth in spring.

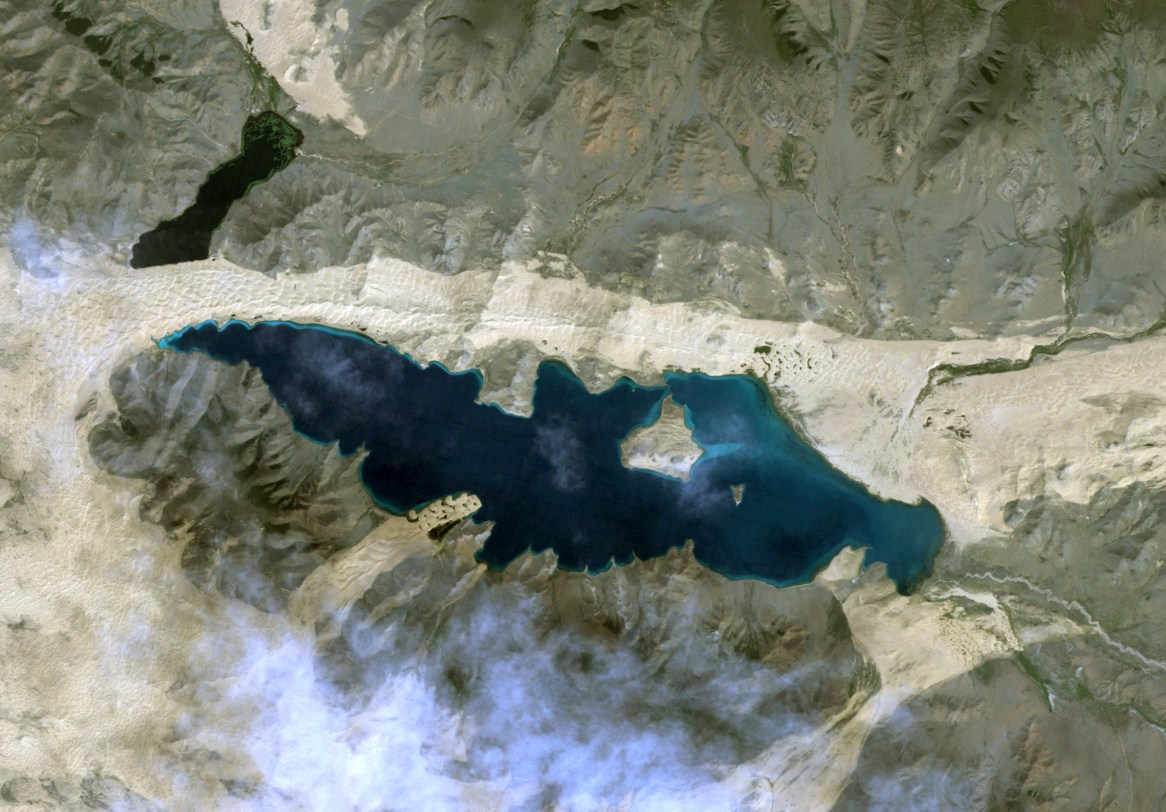
Satellite image (Landsat 7), conventional image orientation - north on top, 2006-08-06.

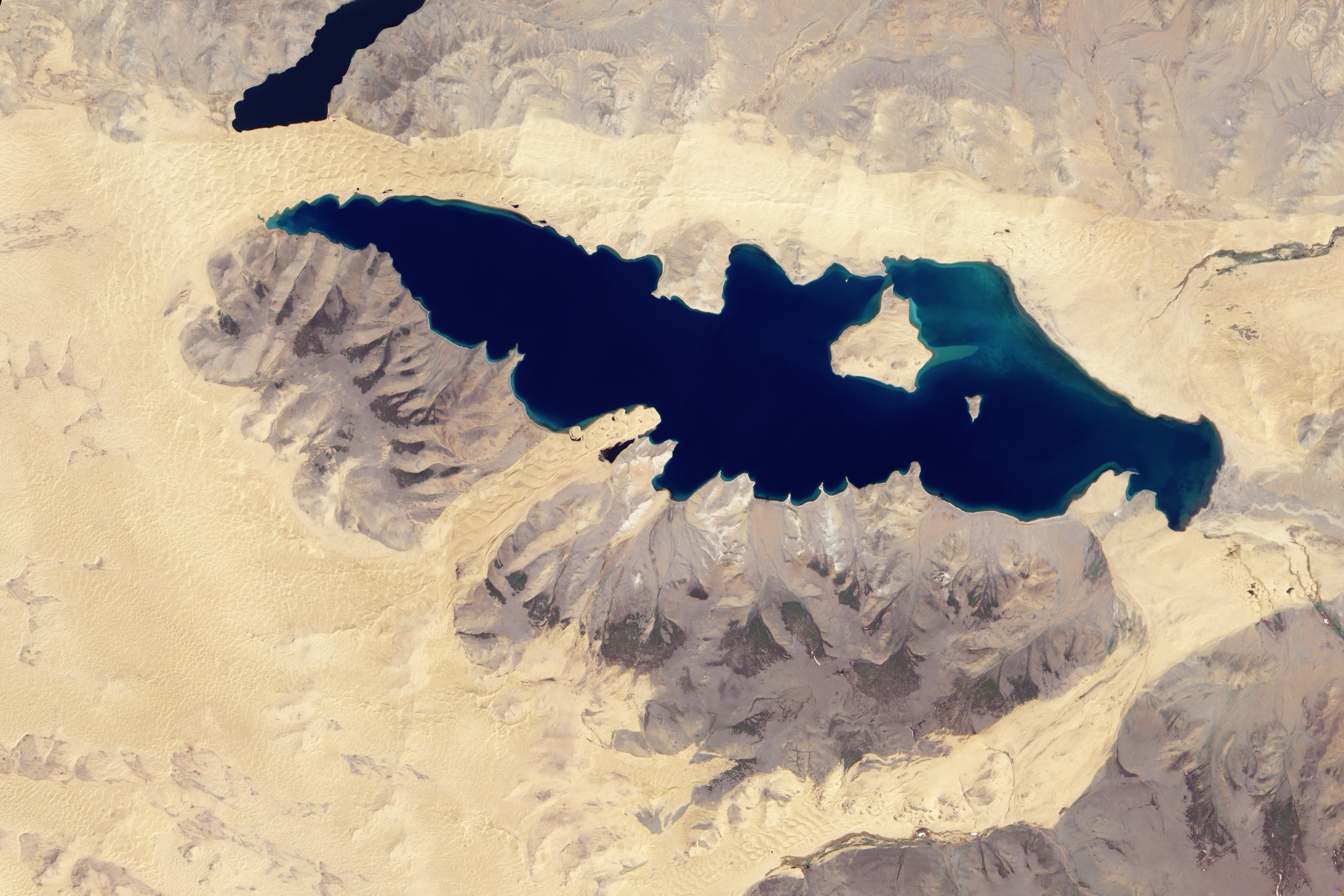
Natural-colour satellite image of the lake.
