= Khyargas Nuur =

Lake in Uvs Province, Mongolia

Khyargas Lake
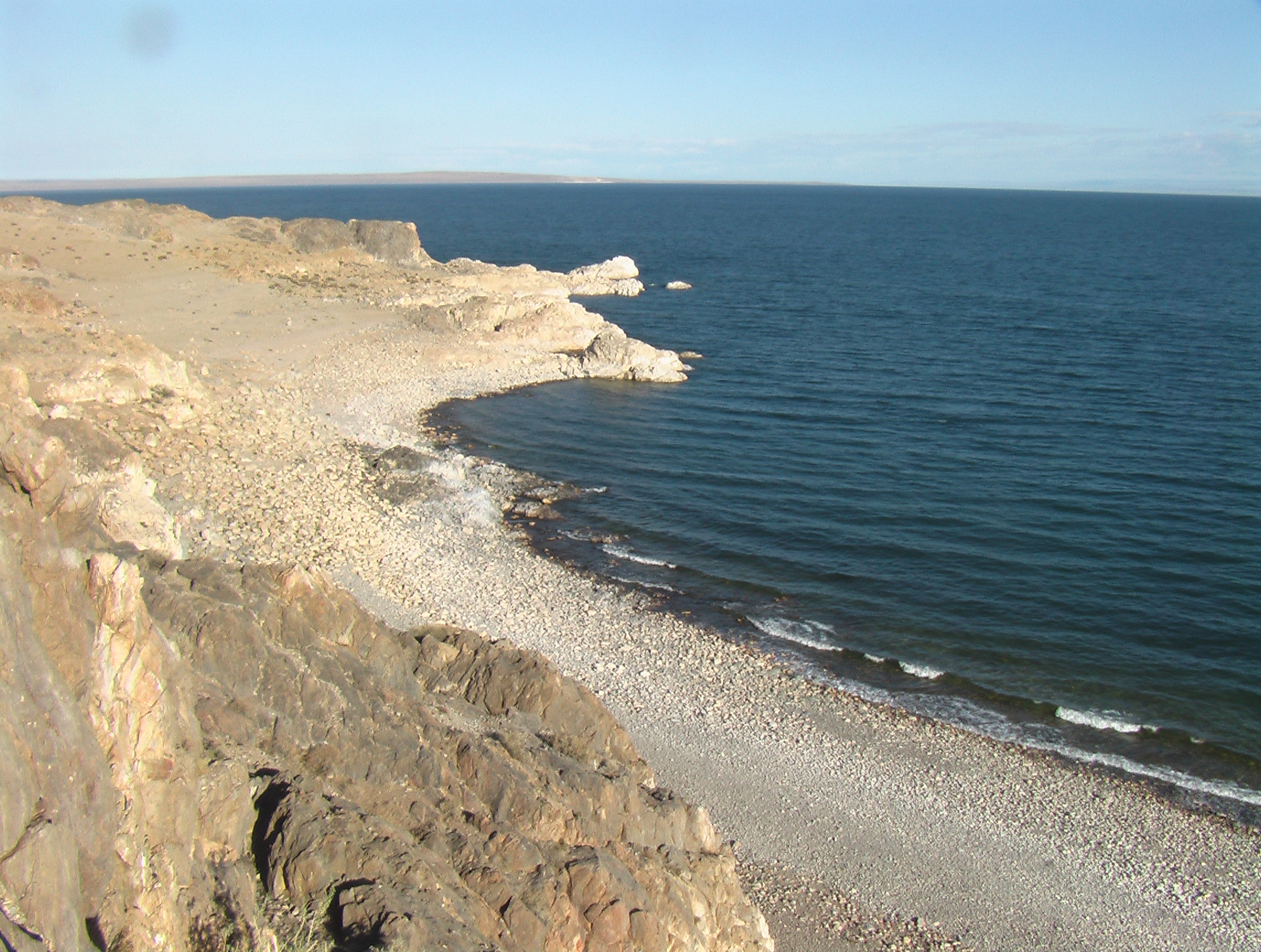
- Khyargas Lake's southeastern shore

- Location within Mongolia

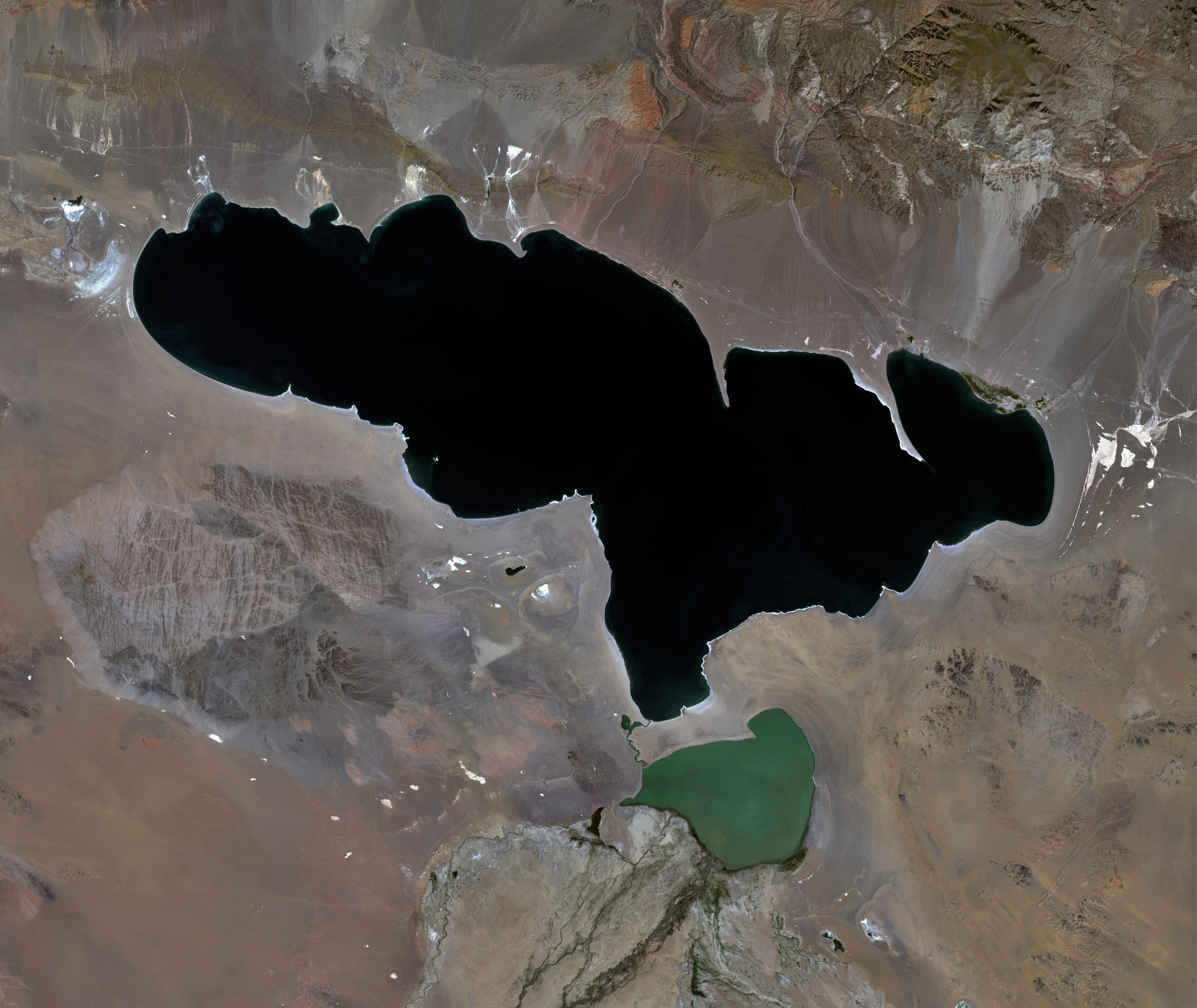
- A satellite image of Lake Khyargas taken from Landsat-7. Smaller lake south of the Khyargas Lake is Airag Lake.
- Location: Khyargas district, Uvs Province
- Coordinates: 49°08′N 93°25′E
- Type: Endorheic
- Primary inflows: Zavkhan River via Airag Nuur
- Primary outflows: no
- Basin countries: Mongolia
- Max. length: 75 km (47 mi)
- Max. width: 31 km (19 mi)
- Surface area: 1,407 km^{2} (543 sq mi)
- Average depth: 47 m (154 ft)
- Max. depth: 80 m (260 ft)
- Water volume: 66.034 km^{3} (53,535,000 acre⋅ft)
- Residence time: 54.2 years
- Surface elevation: 1,028.5 m (3,374 ft)
- Islands: one unnamed
- Settlements: no

Khyargas Lake (Mongolian: Хяргас нуур) is a salt lake in Khyargas district, Uvs Province, Western Mongolia.

Some sources are using different Khyargas Lake statistics values:

- Water level: 1,035.29 m (3,396.6 ft)
- Surface area: 1,481.1 km^{2} (571.9 sq mi)
- Average depth: 50.7 m (166 ft)
- Volume: 75.2 km^{3} (18.0 cu mi)

Water balance of Khyargas Lake (Unit of water balance: mm/year)
Surface input		Surface output		Groundwater inflow- outflow	Retention time, years
Precipitation	Inflow	Evaporation	Outflow	Groundwater inflow- outflow	Retention time, years
55.9	652.4	937.1	0	+228.8	54.2

The Khyargas Lake National Park is based on the lake. This protected area was established in 2000 and covers about 3,328 km^{2}. It also includes a freshwater Airag Lake.
