= Oirat language =

Central Mongolic language

Oirat
- Oirat Mongolian
- ᡆᡕᡅᠷᠠᡑ ᡘᡄᠯᡄᠨ; Oyirad kelen Өөрд келн ᠮᠣᠩᠭᠣᠯ ᠬᠡᠯᠡᠨ ᠦ ᠣᠢᠷᠠᠳ ᠠᠶᠠᠯᠭᠤ; Mongɣol kelen-ü Oyirad ayalɣu Монгол хэлний Ойрад аялгуу
- Pronunciation: [øːˈɾət kʰeˈlən]
- Native to: Mongolia, Russia, China, Kyrgyzstan
- Region: Khovd, Uvs, Bayan-Ölgii, Kalmykia, Xinjiang, Gansu, Qinghai, Siberia
- Ethnicity: 655,372 Oirats
- Native speakers: 368,000, 58% of ethnic population (2007–2010)
- Language family: Mongolic: Central Mongolic; Buryat–Mongolian; Mongolian; Oirat
- Standard forms: Kalmyk
- Writing system: Clear script (China and Mongolia: official), Cyrillic (Russia and Mongolia: official)

Official status
- Official language in: Kalmykia, Russia (in the form of Kalmyk); Siberia, Russia; Haixi Mongol and Tibetan Autonomous Prefecture in Qinghai, China; Bayingolin Mongol Autonomous Prefecture and Bortala Mongol Autonomous Prefecture in Xinjiang Uyghur Autonomous Region, China

Language codes
- ISO 639-2: xal Kalmyk
- ISO 639-3: Either: xal – Kalmyk Oirat xwo – Written Oirat
- Glottolog: kalm1243
- Linguasphere: of 44-BAA-b part of 44-BAA-b
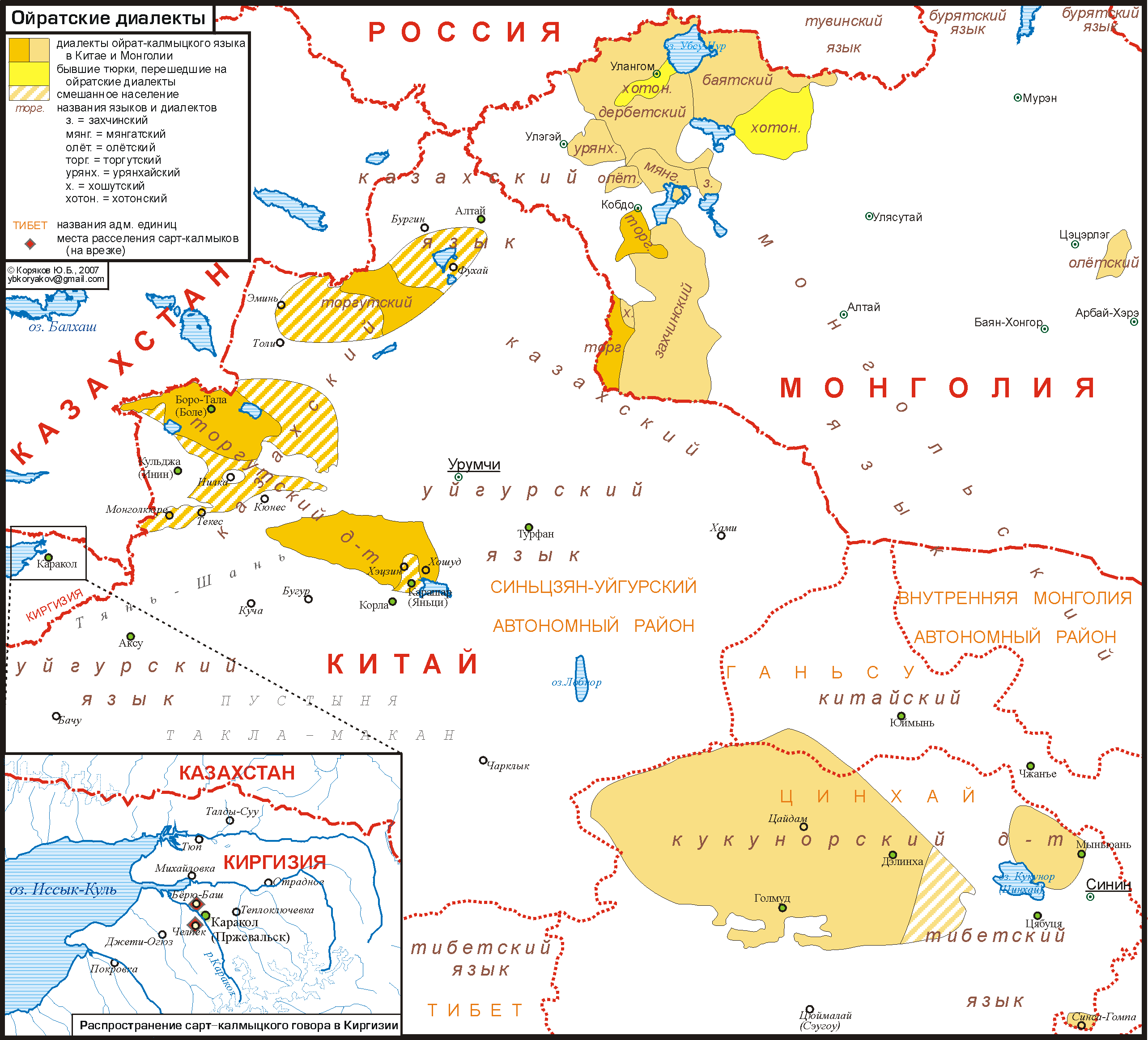
- A map (in Russian) showing the distribution of Oirat outside Kalmykia. Varieties in dispute have not been included.

- Manchurian Ölöt is classified as Severely Endangered by the UNESCO Atlas of the World's Languages in Danger.

Oirat (Clear Script: ᡆᡕᡅᠷᠠᡑ
ᡍᡄᠯᡄᠨ, Oyirad kelen; Kalmyk: Өөрд, Öörd [øːˈɾət]; Khalkha: Ойрад, Oirad [ˈœe̯ɾət]) is a Mongolic language spoken by the descendants of the Oirats, now forming parts of Mongols in China, Kalmyks in Russia, and citizens of Mongolia. Largely mutually intelligible to other core Central Mongolic languages, scholars differ as to whether they regard Oirat as a distinct language or a major dialect of the Mongolian language. Oirat-speaking areas are scattered across the far west of Mongolia, the northwest of China and Russia's Siberia region and Caspian coast, where its major variety is Kalmyk. In China, it is spoken mainly in Xinjiang, but also among the Upper Mongols of Qinghai and Subei County in Gansu.

In all three countries, Oirat has become variously endangered or even obsolescent as a direct result of government actions or as a consequence of social and economic policies. Its most widespread tribal dialect, which is spoken in all of these nations, is Torgut Oirat. The term Oirat or more precisely, Written Oirat is sometimes also used to refer to the language of historical documents written in the Clear Script.

== Dialects ==
In Mongolia, there are seven historical Oirat dialects, each corresponding to a different tribe:

1. Dörbet is spoken in half of the districts (sums) of Uvs Province and in Dörgön sum, Khovd Province
2. Bayat in the sums of Malchin, Khyargas, Tes and Züüngovi, Uvs
3. Torgut in Bulgan sum, Khovd
4. Altai Uriankhai in the sums of Duut and Mönkhkhairkhan, Khovd and in the sums of Altai, Buyant and Bulgan, Bayan-Ölgii Province
5. Ööld in Erdenebüren, Khovd
6. Zakhchin in the sums of Mankhan, Altai, Üyench, Zereg and Möst, Khovd
7. Khoton in Tarialan, Uvs.

In China, the main Oirat dialects are:

1. Khosut dialect (和硕特土语) also commonly referred to as Qinghai Mongolian (蒙古语青海土语) mainly in Haixi, Qinghai and Subei, Gansu.
2. Torghut dialect (吐尔扈特土语) in Xinjiang mainly in Hoboksar and Bortala.

There are some varieties of Oirat that are difficult to classify. The Alasha dialect in Alxa League, Inner Mongolia, originally belonged to Oirat and has been classified as such by some because of its phonology. However, it has been classified by others as Mongolian proper because of its morphology. The Darkhad dialect in Mongolia's Khövsgöl Province has variously been classified as Oirat, Mongolian proper, or (less often) Buryat.

== Endangerment ==
Oirat is endangered in all areas where it is spoken. In Russia, the killing of a large fraction of the Kalmyk population and the destruction of their society as consequences of the Kalmyk deportations of 1943, along with the subsequent imposition among them of Russian as the sole official language have rendered the language obsolescent: it is almost exclusively the elderly who have a fluent command of Kalmyk. In China, while Oirat is still quite widely used in its traditional ranges and there are many monolingual speakers, a combination of government policies and social realities has created an environment deleterious to the use of this language: the Chinese authorities' adoption of Southern Mongolian as the normative Mongolian language, new educational policies which have led to the virtual elimination of Mongolian schools in Xinjiang (there were just two left as of 2009), policies aiming to curtail nomadism, and the limited occupational prospects in Chinese society for graduates of Mongolian schools. As for Mongolia, the predominance of Khalkha Mongolian is bringing about the Khalkhaization of all other varieties of Mongolian.

== Writing system ==
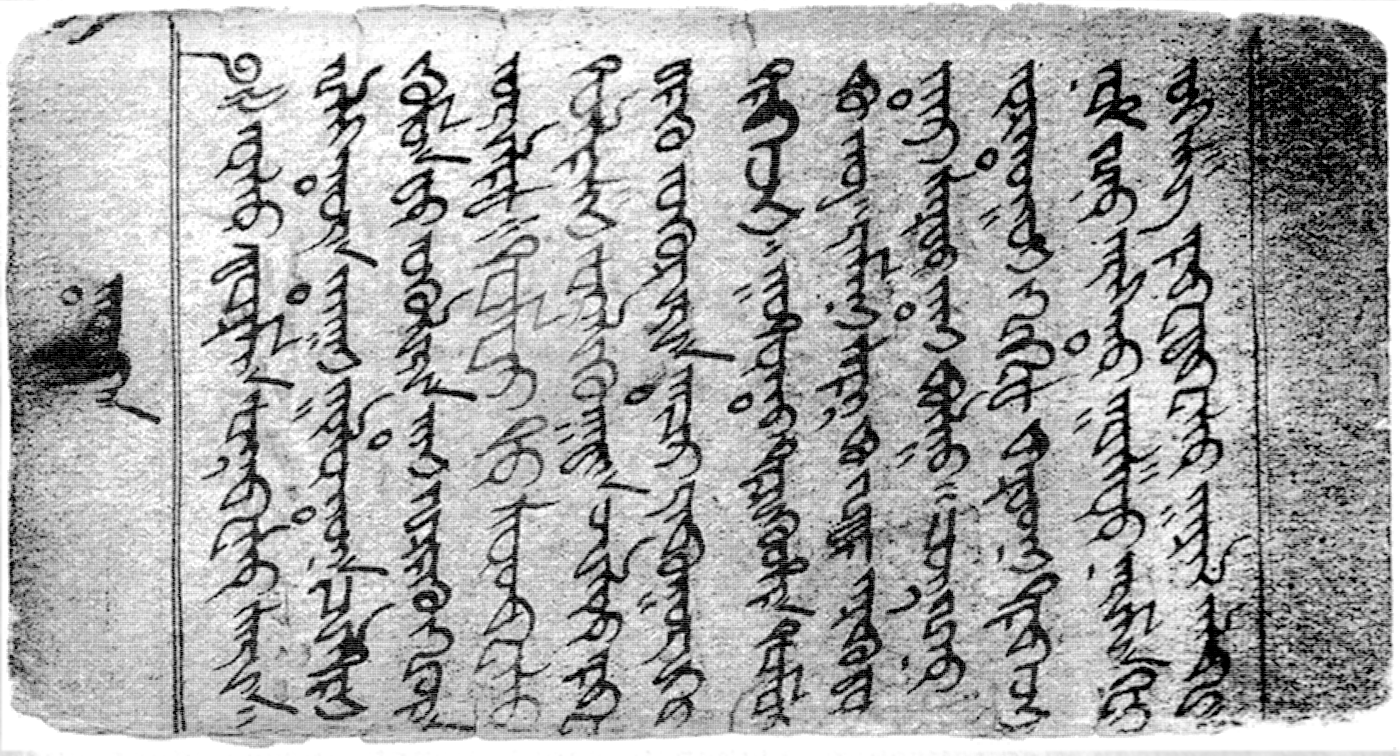
An Oirat manuscript in "clear script" (todo bichig)

Oirat has been written in two script systems: the Mongolian scripts and Cyrillic.

Historically, the Clear script, which originated from the Mongolian script, was used. It uses modified letters shapes e.g. to differentiate between different rounded vowels, and it uses a small stroke on the right to indicate vowel length. It was retained longest in China where it can still be found in an occasional journal article. However, in China, Buryat and Oirat are considered non-standard compared to Southern Mongolian and are therefore supposed to use the Mongolian script and Southern Mongolian grammar for writing. In practice the people use neither and resort to learning Mandarin Chinese and using hànzì to communicate with others in China.

In Kalmykia, a Cyrillic-based script system has been implemented. It does not represent epenthetic vowels, and thus does not show syllabification.

In Mongolia, Central Mongolian minority varieties have no status, so Oirats are supposed to use Mongolian Cyrillic which de facto only represents Khalkha Mongolian.
