= Khovd =

Khovd (Mongolian: Ховд; in older sources also Kobdo) can refer to:

- Khovd River, a river in the west of Mongolia
- Khovd (city), the capital of Khovd aimag
- Khovd Province, an aimag (province) in Mongolia
- Khovd Airport, the airport of Khovd city
- Heise peak, on Bayankharikhan mountain south of Khovd River
- several sums (districts) in different aimags of Mongolia:
  - Khovd, Khovd
  - Khovd, Uvs
