= Standard Mongolian =

Standard languages of Mongolian are the following:

== Standard Mongolian ==
- Mongolian as spoken in Mongolia which in praxi is based on the Khalkha dialect
- Standard Mongolian in China which is phonetically based on the Chakhar dialect and grammatically based on a mix of the grammar of various Inner Mongolian dialects with some written Mongolian influences

== Standard Oirat Mongolian ==
- Kalmyk, a standard variety of Oirat Mongolian recognized in Kalmykia
- Oirat as still unofficially written in Clear script in Xinjiang which in praxi is based on the Torgut dialect

== Standard Buryat Mongolian ==
- Buryat Mongolian based on the Khori dialect recognized in Buryatia
