= Khar Us Nuur National Park =

National park of Altai mountains in Khovd Province, Mongolia

Har Us Nuur National Park
- (Also: Khar-Us Nuur); Mongolian: Хар Ус Нуур
- IUCN category II (national park)
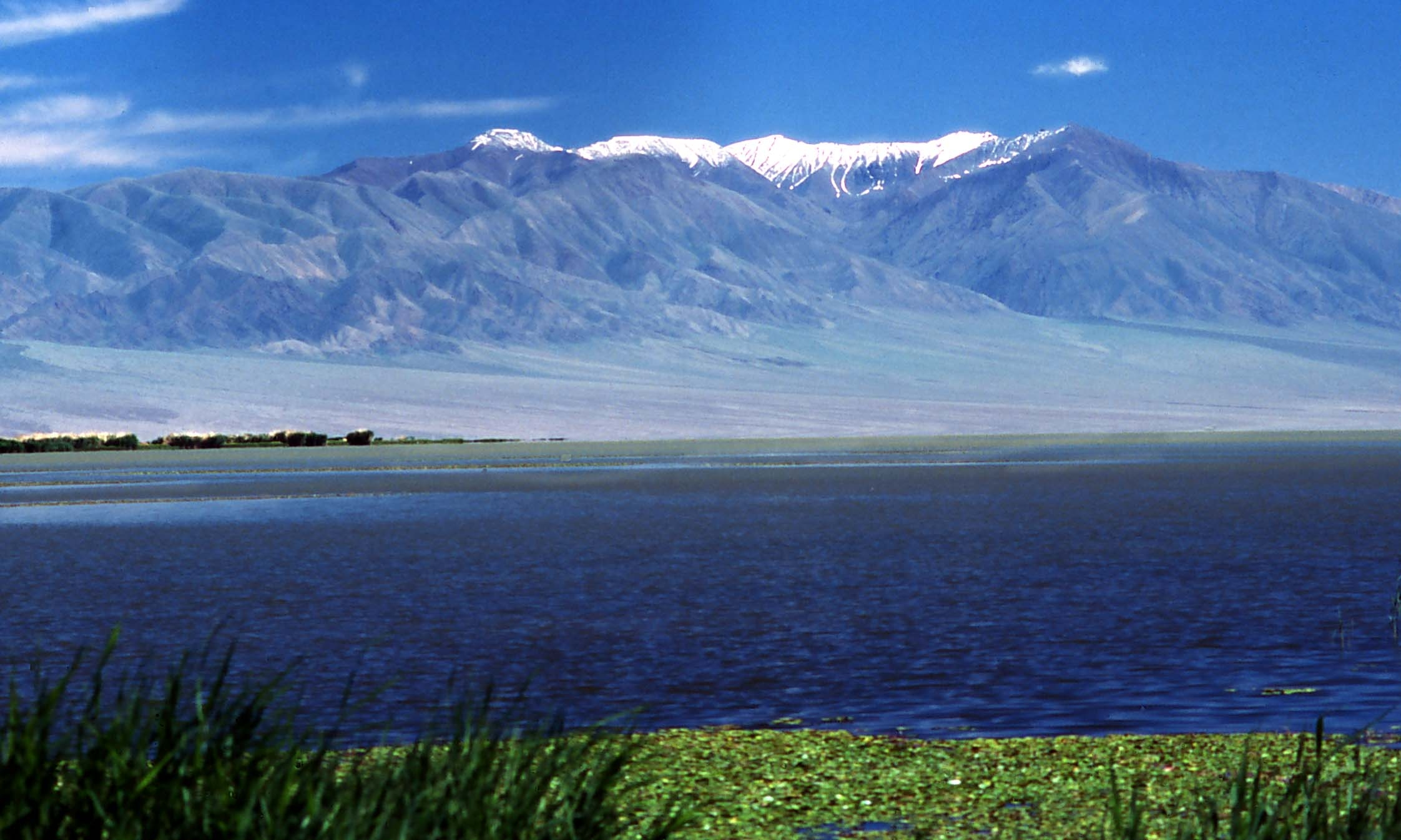
- Jargalant Mountain

- Location within Mongolia
- Location: Khovd Province, Mongolia
- Nearest city: Khovd
- Coordinates: 48.3°N 92.74°E
- Area: 8,503 square kilometres (3,283 sq mi)
- Established: 1997
- Governing body: Ministry of Environment and Green Development of Mongolia

Khar Us Nuur National Park (Mongolian: Хар Ус нуурын байгалийн цогцолборт газар, romanized: Khar Us nuuriin baigaliin cogcolbort gazar) is a national park in Khovd Province, Mongolia. It covers a chain of three large lakes in the Great Lakes Basin of western Mongolia. The lakes, Khar-Us Nuur, Khar Lake and Dörgön Lake are bordered by marshes and reed-beds that are an important breeding sport for birds, over 200 species of which have been identified in the park. Mount Jargalant is on the southern shore of Khar-Us. This park is distinct from Khyargas Nuur National Park, another large lake in the region, but 60 km to the north.

== Topography ==
The main lake is Khar-Us Nuur ("Black water lake"), 70 km at its longest extent. Khar-Us is fed by the Khovd Gol (River), which enters in a delta on the west side. In the north of the 1,852 km^{2} lake is a large island, Agbash ("White Head"), with an area of 274 km^{2}. Immediately east of Khar-Us is Khar Lake ("Black Lake", 565 km^{2}), which is connected by a canal with Dörgön Lake (300 km^{2}) to the southeast. The first two lakes are freshwater, the third is saline. On the southern edge of Khar-Us is Jargalant Mountain, with an elevation of 3,796 metres (12,454 ft). The park is surrounded by semi-arid desert steppe. The lakes, once part of a larger single lake 5,000 years ago, are fed by rivers from the surrounding Altai Mountains.

== Climate and ecoregion ==
The climate of the area is Cold semi-arid climate (Köppen climate classification (BSk)). This climate is characteristic of steppe climates intermediary between desert humid climates, and typically have precipitation is above evapotranspiration. At least one month averages below 0 °C (32 °F). Precipitation in the area averages 122 mm/year. The lakes are frozen for half the year (November to April). The park is situated in the Great Lakes Basin desert steppe ecoregion.

== Flora and fauna ==
The marshes are largely Phragmites communis (reeds). Birds include the endangered White-headed duck (Oxyura leucocephala), the near-threatened Dalmatian pelican (Pelecanus crispus) (formerly breeding in the park, but lately only passing through), and the vulnerable Swan goose (Anser cygnoides). There are three species of endemic fish, including the Narrow-headed Altai osman (Oreoleuciscus angusticephalus). in the 1960s, muskrat (Ondatra zibethicus) were introduced to the area for fur production; they have grown in number and place pressure on the reed beds.

== See also ==
- List of national parks of Mongolia
