= Agbash =

Agbash or Ağbaş may refer to:

- Abovyan, Ararat, Armenia
- Ağbaş, Davachi, Azerbaijan
- Ağbash, Azerbaijan
- Agbash (island), Mongolia
