= Museum of Khovd Province =

Museum in Khovd City, Khovd Province, Mongolia

- Ховд Aймгийн Музей
- Established: 1950
- Location: Khovd City, Khovd Province, Mongolia
- Coordinates: 48°00′24.5″N 91°38′27.3″E
- Type: museum
- Collection size: 3,100

The Museum of Khovd Province (Mongolian: Ховд Aймгийн Музей) is a museum in Khovd City, Khovd Province, Mongolia.

== History ==
The museum was originally established in 1950 as Local Propagation Cabinet with 300 exhibits. In 1967, it was upgraded into Museum of Khovd Province of Local History, and it was finally upgraded to Museum of Khovd Province in 1991.

== Exhibitions ==
The museum is divided into nine exhibition halls, which are ancient history, pride, fine arts, ethnicity, president, religion, fame, nature and geography. It houses around 3,100 exhibits.

== See also ==
- List of museums in Mongolia
