= Halzan Buregtei mine =

Mine in Khovd, Mongolia

- Location: Khovd Province, Mongolia
- Products: Tantalum

The Halzan Buregtei mine is a large mine located in the northern part of Mongolia in Khovd Province. Halzan Buregtei represents one of the largest tantalum reserves in Mongolia having estimated reserves of 218.8 million tonnes of ore grading 0.016% tantalum.
