= Buyant River =

River of Mongolia

Coordinates: 48°13′00″N 91°53′00″E

Buyant River Буянт гол ᠪᠤᠶᠠᠨᠲᠤᠭᠣᠣᠯ
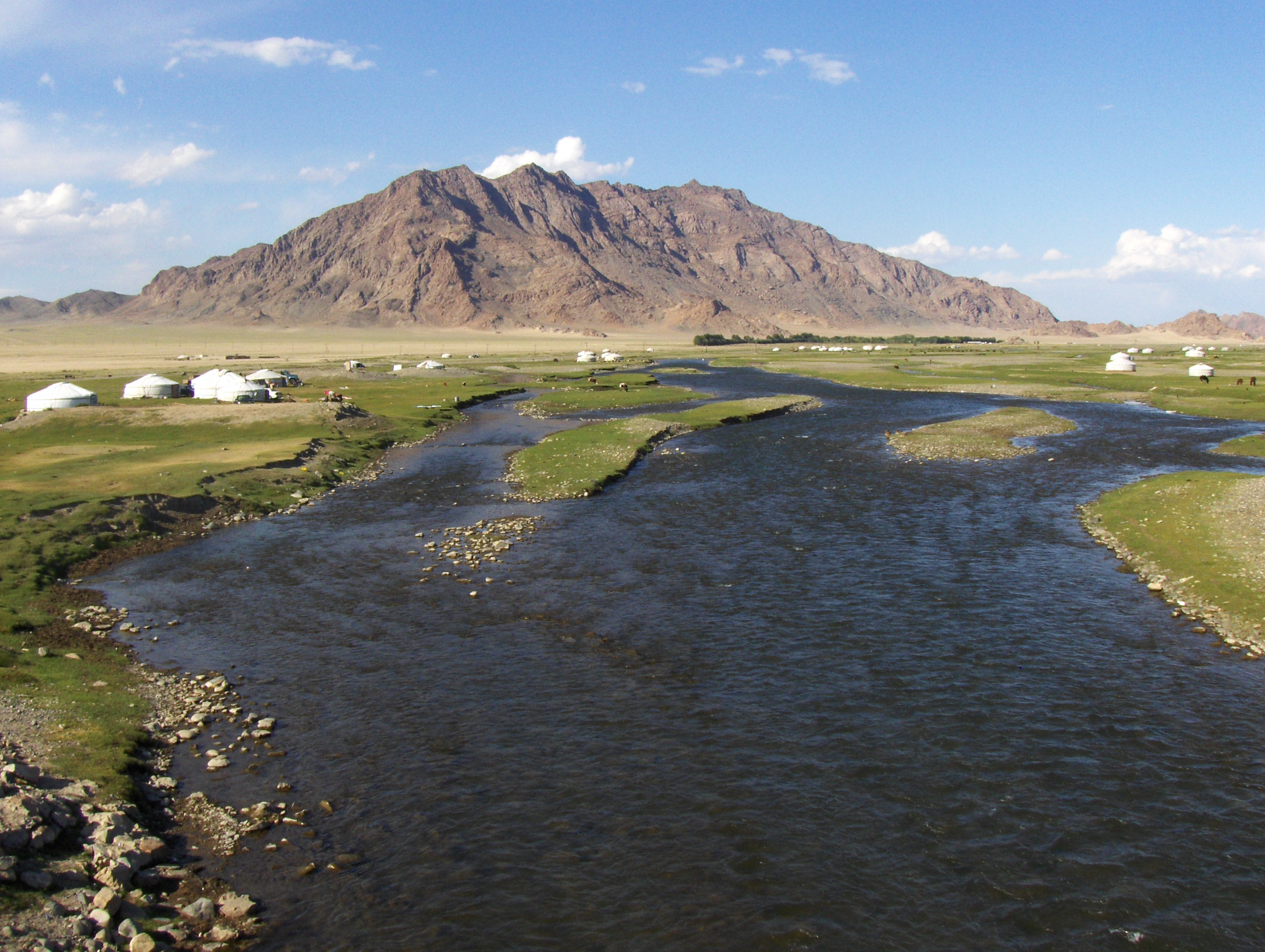
- Native name: Буянт гол (Mongolian)

Location
- Country: Mongolia
- Aimags: Khovd, Bayan-Ölgii

Physical characteristics
- Source: Altai Mountains
- Mouth: Khovd River
- Length: 218 km (135 mi)
- Basin size: 8,350 km^{2} (3,220 sq mi)

Buyant River (Mongolian: Буянт гол, romanized: Buyant gol) is a river in western Mongolia, a tributary of the Khovd River. The sources are located in the Altai Mountains. The length is 218 km (135 mi), the area of the basin is 8,350 km^{2} (3,220 sq mi). The city of Khovd is located on the bank of the river.

== See also ==
- List of rivers of Mongolia
