= Chandmani, Khovd =

District in Khovd Province, Mongolia

Chandmani District Чандмань сум ᠴᠢᠨᠳᠠᠮᠠᠨᠢᠰᠤᠮᠤ
- District
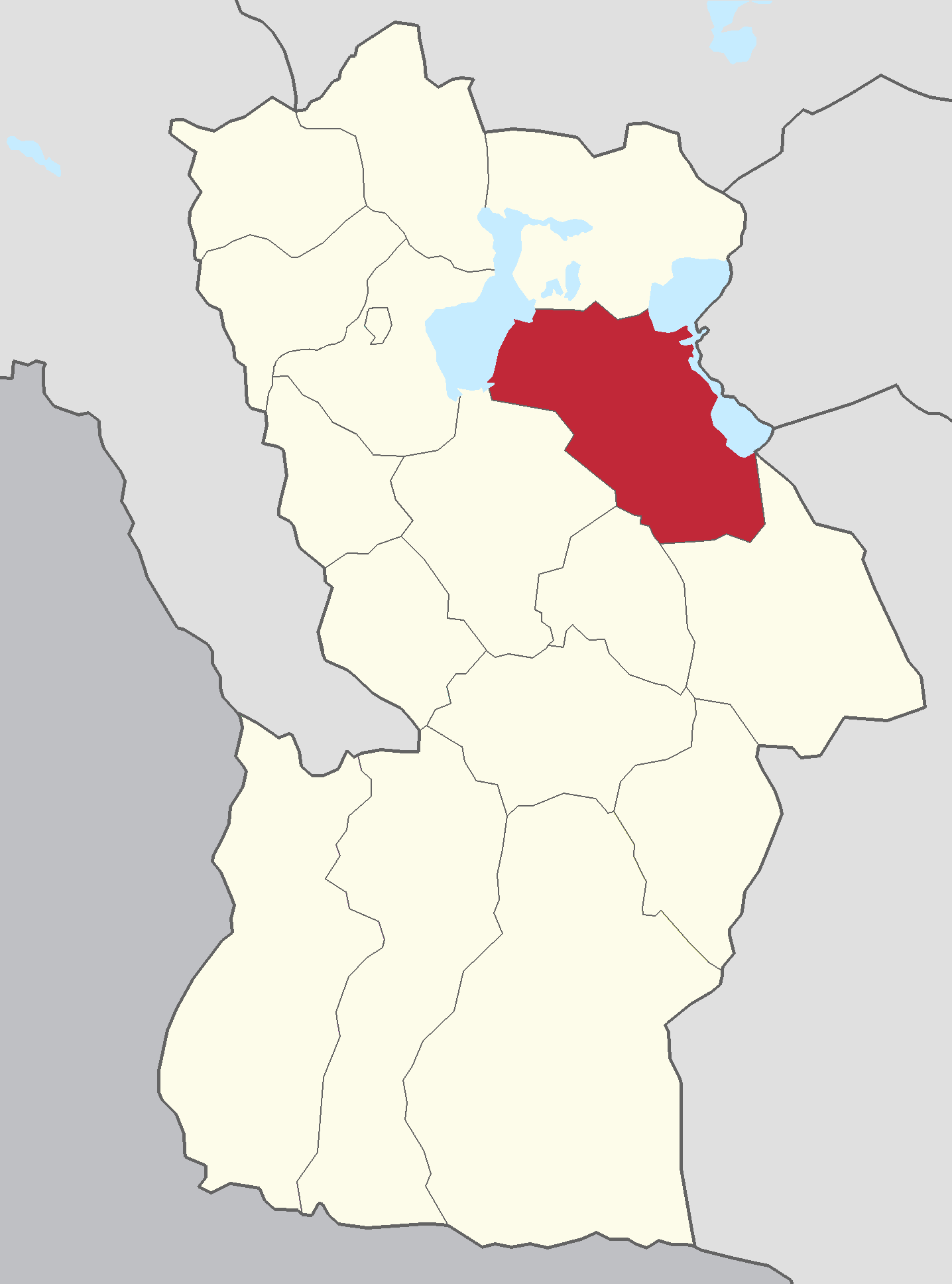
- Chandmani District in Khovd Province

- Location within Mongolia
- Coordinates: 47°39′52″N 92°48′53″E
- Country: Mongolia
- Province: Khovd Province

Area
  - Total: 6,016 km^{2} (2,323 sq mi)
- Time zone: UTC+7 (UTC + 7)
- Website: http://chandmani.kho.gov.mn/

Chandmani (Mongolian: Чандмань) is a sum (district) of Khovd Province in western Mongolia. It is 160 km away from the city of Khovd.

== Geography ==
The district has a total area of 6,016 km^{2}.

== Administrative divisions ==
The district is divided into six bags, which are:

- Bayankhairkhan
- Jargalant
- Suljee
- Takhilt
- Taliin Bulag
- Urd Gol
