= Torgut Oirat =

Oirat dialect of Xinjiang (China), west Mongolia and Kalmykia (Russia)

Torgut
- Native to: People's Republic of China, Mongolia, Russia
- Region: Xinjiang, Khovd, eastern Kalmykia
- Native speakers: (270,000, incl. all Kalmyk in Russia, cited 1987–2002)
- Language family: Mongolic: Central Mongolic; Buryat–Mongolian; Mongolian; Oirat; Kalmyk; Torgut

Language codes
- ISO 639-3: –
- Glottolog: torg1245

Torgut (Oirat: Торһд, romanized: Torhd, [torˈɣət]), also spelled Torghud, is a dialect of the Oirat language spoken in Xinjiang, in western Mongolia and in eastern Kalmykia (where it was the basis for Kalmyk, the literary standard language of that region). Thus, it has more speakers than any other variety of Oirat. It is better researched than any other Oirat variety spoken in China.

== Distribution ==
The Torgut dialect is spoken in Russia in Eastern Kalmykia, in Bulgan sum in Khovd Province in Mongolia and in the Chinese autonomous region of Xinjiang, mainly in three separate areas in its north-western part. Sečenbaγatur et al. give an exhaustive list of the areas of Xinjiang where Oirat (in many cases Torgut) is spoken that also includes some places in north-eastern Xinjiang: the autonomous prefectures of Bayangol and Bortala, the counties Hoboksar and Dörbiljin and the city of Wusu in Tacheng Prefecture, the counties Küriye, Tekes and Nilka in the Ili Prefecture, the prefectures Altay, Hamil and Changji and Xinjiang's capital city, Ürümqi. To some degree, this distribution can be associated with the history of the Torgut tribe, one of the four crucial members of the clan federation "Dörben Oirat".

== Grammar ==
=== Phonology ===
Torgut has the vowel phonemes that may be short or long. When appearing in the first syllable of a word, these vowels determine the vowel harmony class, e.g. Written Mongolian talbiγun, Khalkha-Mongolian

Vowel phonemes of Torgut
	Front		Central	Back
	unrounded	rounded	Central	Back
High	i iː	y yː		u uː
Mid	e eː		ɵ ɵː	o oː
Low	æ æː		a aː	

/i/, /iː/, and /æː/ in a non-initial syllable are neutral vowels. /oː/, /ɵː/ and /eː/ never appear in any but the first syllable of a word.

Consonant phonemes of Torgut
		Labial		Alveolar		Postalveolar	Dorsal	Uvular
		plain	pal.	plain	pal.	Postalveolar	Dorsal	Uvular
Nasal		m	mʲ	n	nʲ		ŋ	
Stop	voiceless	p		t			k	
Stop	voiced	b		d			g	ɢ
Affricate	voiceless			ts		tʃ		
Affricate	voiced					dʒ		
Fricative	voiceless			s		ʃ	x	
Fricative	voiced			z			(ɣ)	
Rhotic				r				
Approximant		w		l	lʲ		j	

/ɢ/ can also have an allophone of [ɣ].

=== Nominal system ===
Most of the plural forms of Torgut are common Mongolian, -mu:d is normal Oirat, but -sud seems to be somewhat peculiar. The case system is standard Oirat which differs from Mongolian in lacking an allative and retaining the old comitative case, that is, it is rather conservative. In contrast to Middle Mongolian and Southern Mongolian and in agreement with Khalkha, the accusative case always has -g, not -i. The reflexive-possessive retains -n, thus -aan.

The pronominal forms are not substantially different from Khalkha. The first person singular pronoun stem is nam- ~ nan-, next to the standard Mongolian first person plural there is also a variant in ma-, namely madan, madnu:s (both nominative), and the third person singular accusative is peculiar in that it is based on the regular stem yy/n- (proximal, distal is tyy/n-), thus inflecting as yyg compared to Written Mongolian ⟨egün-i⟩, Standard Khalkha ⟨üünijg⟩.

=== Verbal system ===
The old voluntative -su: ~ -s is retained in Oirat, while the new voluntative -ja (at least in Xinjiang Torgut) rather tends to indicate a plural subject. Like in all Oirat varieties, the converb -xla: is quite common. As is common to all Oirat dialects except for Alasha, participles and finite verbal suffixes can inflect for first and second person and for number; in case it is present, these inflections follow a modal particle. Else, the formal inventory is what would be expected from a Mongolian variety, though it is not clear to what degree the functions are the same.

== Literature ==
- Birtalan, Ágnes (2003): Oirat. In: Janhunen 2003: 210-228.
- Bläsing, Uwe (2003): Kalmuck. In: Janhunen 2003: 229-247.
- Bulaγ-a (2005): Oyirad ayalγu-yin sudulul. Ürümči: Sinǰiyang-un arad-un keblel-ün qoriy-a.
- Coloo, Ž. (1965): Zahčny aman ajalguu. Ulaanbaatar: ŠUA.
- Coloo, Ž. (1988): BNMAU dah’ mongol helnij nutgijn ajalguuny tol’ bichig: ojrd ajalguu. Ulaanbaatar: ŠUA.
- Janhunen, Juha, ed. (2003). The Mongolic languages. Routledge language family series. London; New York: Routledge. ISBN 978-0-7007-1133-8. OCLC 50803460.
- Sečenbaγatur, Qasgerel, Tuyaγ-a, B. ǰirannige, U Ying ǰe (2005): Mongγul kelen-ü nutuγ-un ayalγun-u sinǰilel-ün uduridqal. Kökeqota: Öbür mongγul-un arad-un keblel-ün qoriy-a.
- Svantesson, Jan-Olof, Anna Tsendina, Anastasia Karlsson, Vivan Franzén (2005): The Phonology of Mongolian. New York: Oxford University Press.
- Убушаев, Н. Н. (1979). Fonetika torgutskogo govora kalmytskogo yazyka Фонетика торгутского говора калмыцкого языка. Элсита: Калмыцкий научно-исследовательский институт.
