= Tsetseg, Khovd =

District in Khovd Province, Mongolia

Coordinates: 46°35′28″N 93°16′05″E

Tsetseg District Цэцэг сум ᠴᠡᠴᠡᠭᠰᠤᠮᠤ
- District
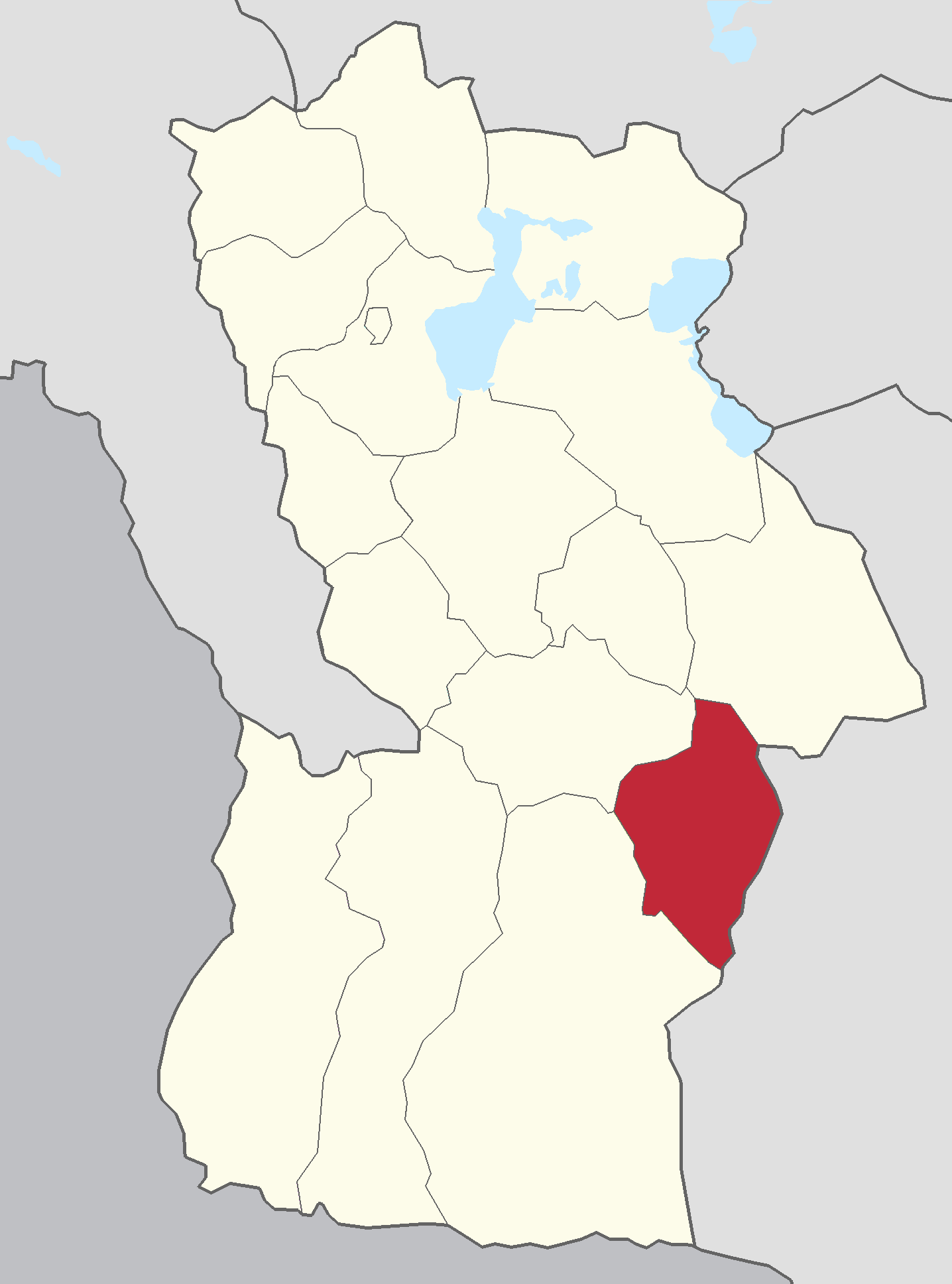
- Tsetseg District in Khovd Province
- Country: Mongolia
- Province: Khovd Province

Area
  - Total: 3,491 km^{2} (1,348 sq mi)
- Time zone: UTC+7 (UTC + 7)

Tsetseg (Mongolian: Цэцэг) is a sum (district) of Khovd Province in western Mongolia. It is 216 km away from the city of Khovd.

== Administrative divisions ==
The district is divided into five bags, which are:

- Bayan-Ovoo
- Bayangol
- Khajinga
- Khushuut
- Tsetseg nuur
