= Khar-Us Lake =

Lake in Khovd Province, Mongolia

- ᠬᠠᠷ᠎ᠠ ᠤᠰᠤ ᠨᠠᠭᠤᠷ (Mongolian)
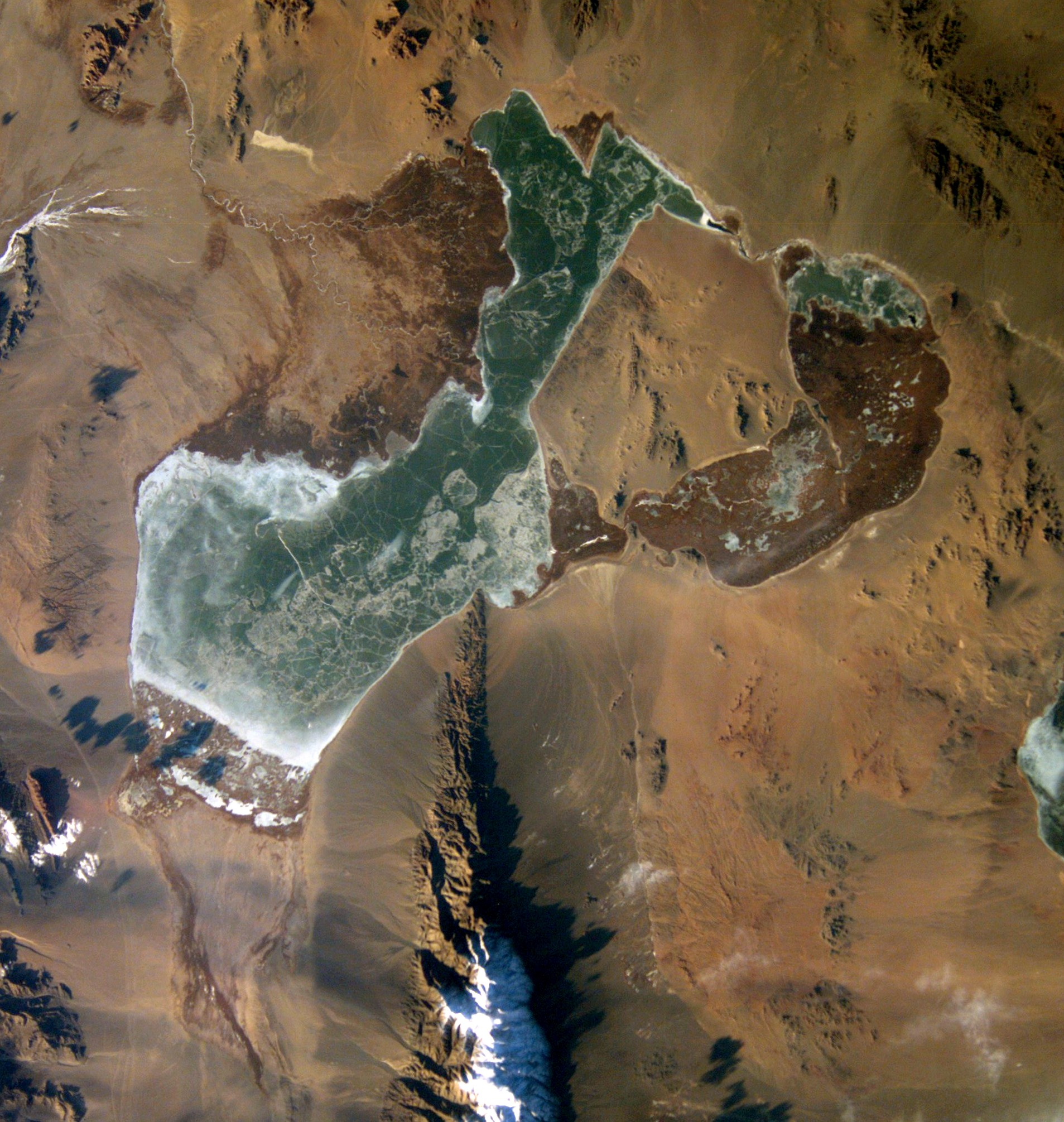
- Khar-Us Lake frozen, Khar Lake fragment is at the western edge of the image, Jargalant-Khaikhan Mounts are south from Lake Khar-Us (NASA astronauts image 2002-12-13).

- Location within Mongolia
- Location: Khovd, Mongolia
- Coordinates: 48°02′N 92°17′E
- Type: freshwater
- Primary inflows: Khovd River
- Primary outflows: Chono Kharaikh gol
- Catchment area: 74,500 km^{2} (28,800 sq mi)
- Basin countries: Mongolia
- Max. length: 72.2 km (44.9 mi)
- Max. width: 36.5 km (22.7 mi)
- Surface area: 1,578 km^{2} (609 sq mi)
- Average depth: 2.2 m (7 ft 3 in)
- Max. depth: 4.5 m (15 ft)
- Water volume: 3.432 km^{3} (2,782,000 acre⋅ft)
- Surface elevation: 1,156.7 m (3,795 ft)
- Frozen: November - April
- Islands: Agbash (Ak-Bashi)
- Settlements: Dörgön

Ramsar Wetland
- Designated: 13 April 1999
- Part of: Har Us Nuur National Park

Khar-Us Lake (Mongolian: Хар-Ус нуур; lit. 'Black Aqua Lake') is a lake in Khovd Province, Mongolia, located in Khar Us Nuur National Park. It is the upper one in a system of the interconnected lakes: Khar-Us, Khar, Dörgön, Airag and Khyargas.

Its area value (1,852 km^{2}) includes the island Agbash (or Ak-Bashi, white head) area (274 km^{2}), so the water surface area is 1,578 km^{2} only.

Some sources are using different Khar-Us Lake Lake statistics values:

- Water level: 1,160.08 m
- Surface area: 1,496.6 km^{2}
- Average depth: 2.1 m
- Volume: 3.12 km^{3}.

Water balance of Khar-Us Lake (Unit of water balance: mm/year)
Surface input		Surface output		Groundwater inflow- outflow	Retention time, years
Precipitation	Inflow	Evaporation	Outflow	Groundwater inflow- outflow	Retention time, years
56.4	1,979.2	942.7	675.3	-417.6	1.1

Primary inflow is the Khovd River, which creates a large river delta.

So called Genghis Khan's wall runs along the western shore of the Khar-Us Lake. It is possible to find it at the Google Map and Google Earth satellite maps 47°53′29″N 91°59′37″E.
