= Zereg =

District in Khovd Province, Mongolia

Coordinates: 47°06′35″N 92°50′40″E

Zereg District Зэрэг сум ᠵᠡᠷᠭᠡᠰᠤᠮᠤ
- District
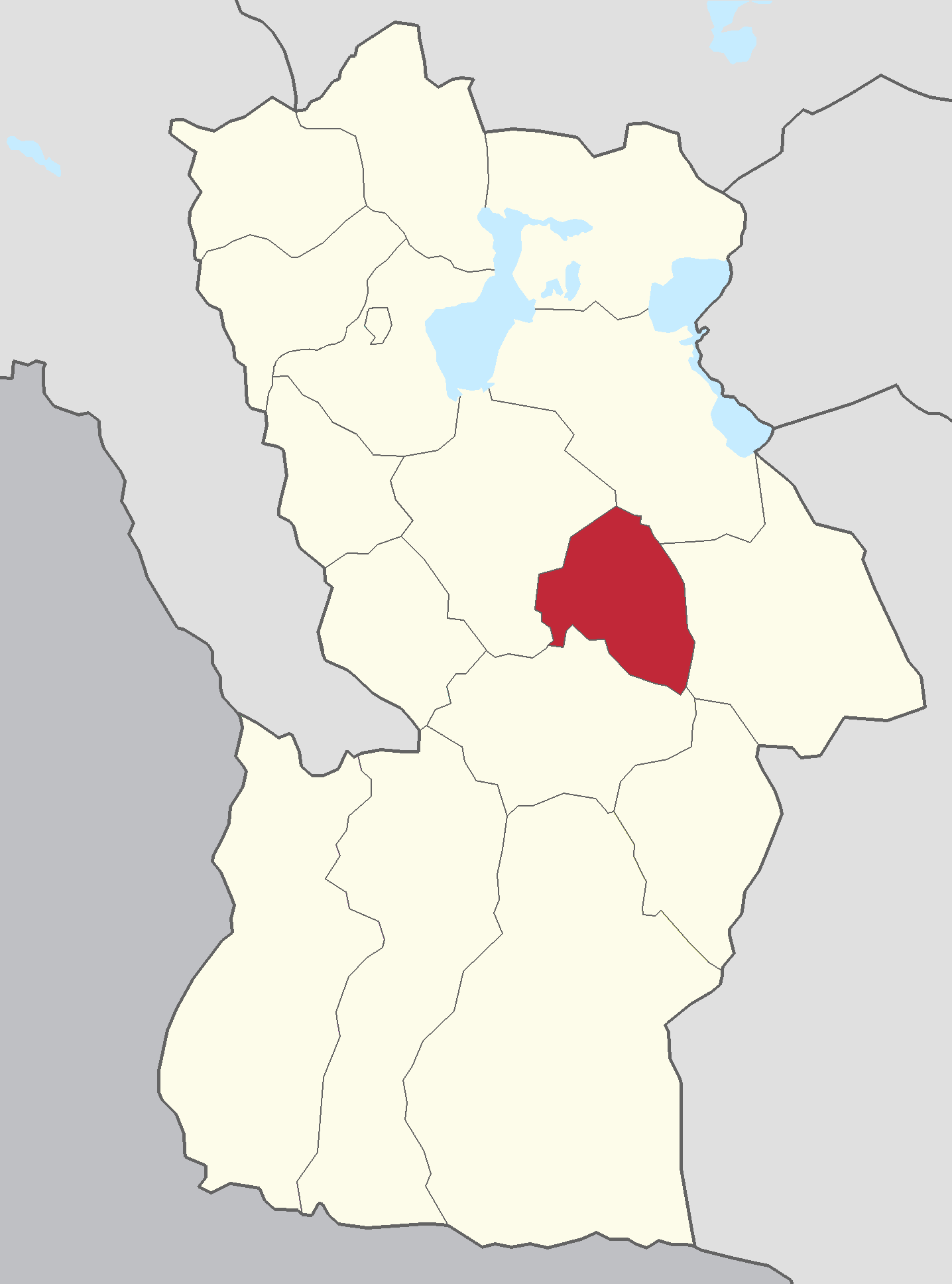
- Zereg District in Khovd Province
- Country: Mongolia
- Province: Khovd Province

Area
  - Total: 2,524 km^{2} (975 sq mi)
- Time zone: UTC+7 (UTC + 7)
- Website: http://zereg.kho.gov.mn/

Zereg (Mongolian: Зэрэг) is a sum (district) of Khovd Province in western Mongolia. The administrative center is Altanteel. The sum is 130 km away from the city of Khovd.

== Administrative divisions ==
The district is divided into five bags, which are:

- Ekhen
- Buraa
- Burgasan
- Guvee
- Khundlun

== Notable people ==
- Tsakhiagiin Elbegdorj, Fourth President of Mongolia (2009-2017)
