= Üyench =

District in Khovd Province, Mongolia

Coordinates: 46°03′49″N 92°02′03″E

Üyench District Үенч сум ᠦᠶ᠋ᠡᠩᠴᠢᠰᠤᠮᠤ
- District
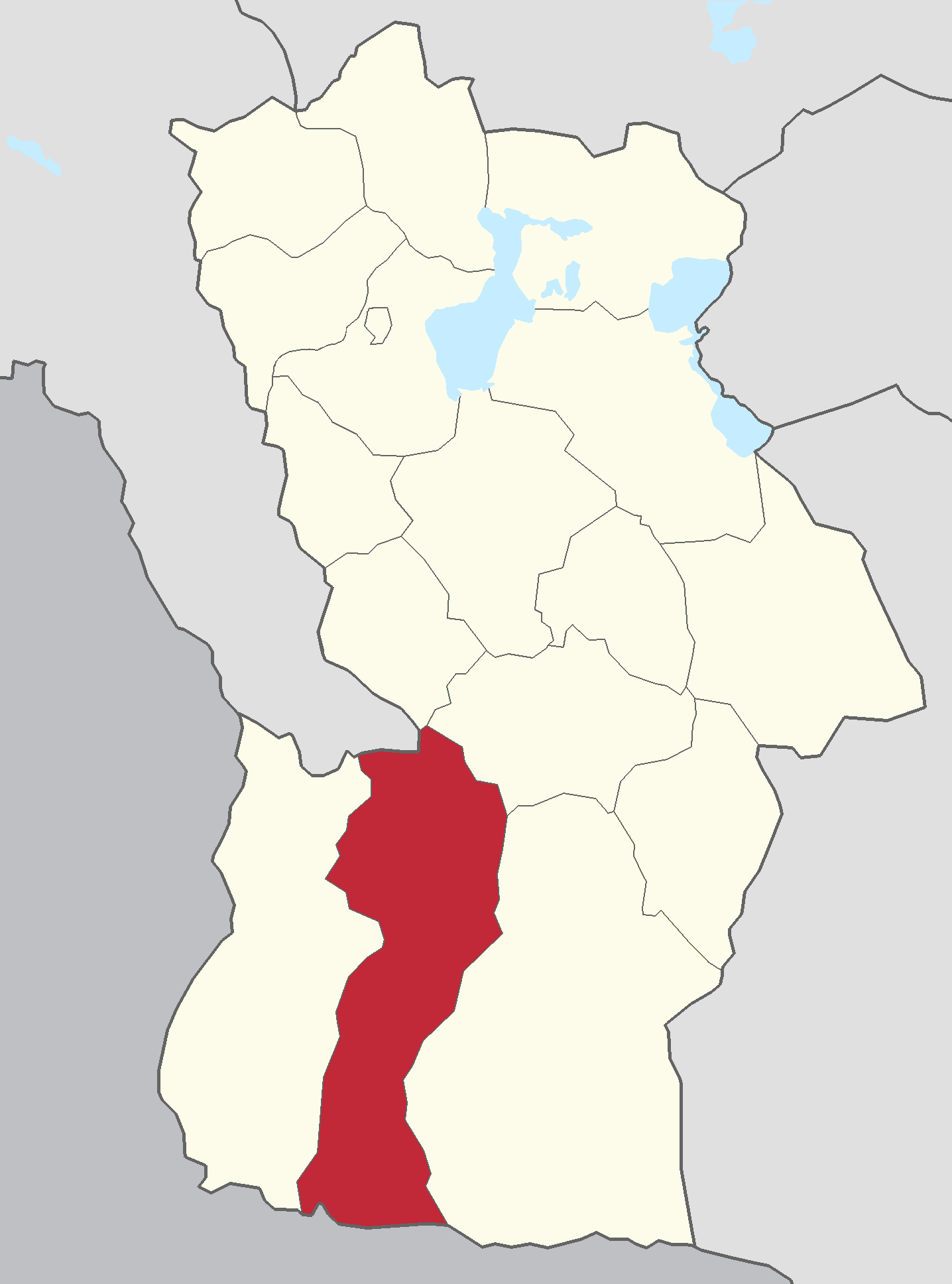
- Üyench District in Khovd Province
- Country: Mongolia
- Province: Khovd Province

Area
  - Total: 7,476 km^{2} (2,886 sq mi)
- Time zone: UTC+7 (UTC + 7)
- Website: http://uyench.kho.gov.mn/

Üyench (Mongolian: Үенч; "ermine") is a sum (district) of Khovd Province in western Mongolia. It is 305 km away from the city of Khovd.

== History ==
In 1968 a research team investigated 31 monuments dated to the Bronze and Early Iron Age near the border of Altai and Üyench sums.

== Administrative divisions ==
The district is divided into five bags, which are:

- Jargalan
- Khukh uzuur
- Nariin gol
- Tsagaantunge
- Uliast
