= Duut =

District in Khovd Province, Mongolia

Coordinates: 47°31′15″N 91°37′44″E

Duut District Дуут сум ᠳᠠᠭᠤᠲᠤᠰᠤᠮᠤ
- District
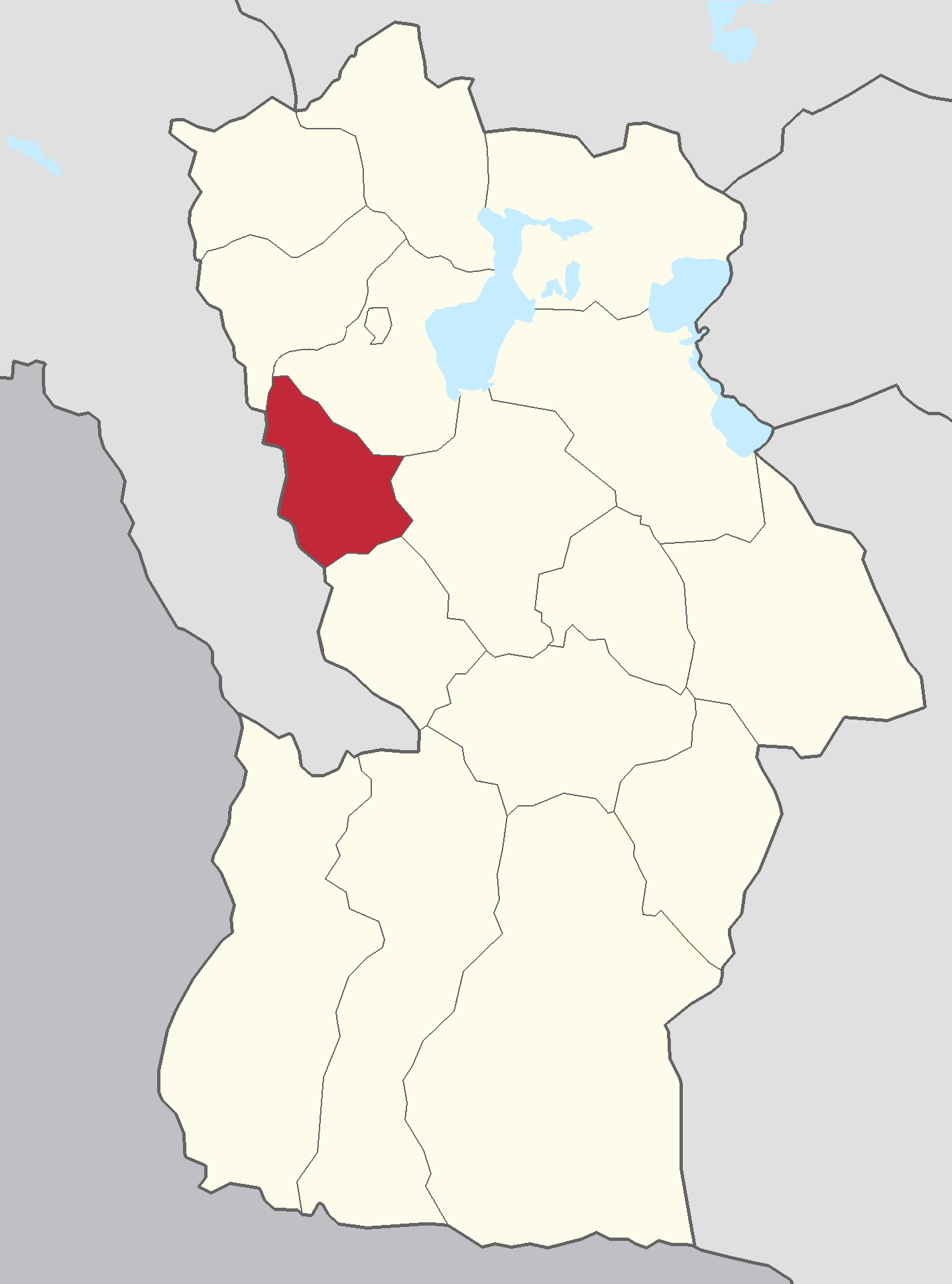
- Duut District in Khovd Province
- Country: Mongolia
- Province: Khovd Province

Area
  - Total: 2,146 km^{2} (829 sq mi)
- Time zone: UTC+7 (UTC + 7)
- Website: http://duut.kho.gov.mn/

Duut (Mongolian: Дуут) is a sum (district) of Khovd Province in western Mongolia. It is 76 km away from the city of Khovd.

== Administrative divisions ==
The district is divided into four bags, which are:

- Bosgo (Mongolian: Босго)
- Khukh belchir (Mongolian: Хөх бэлчир)
- Shiver (Mongolian: Шивэр)
- Tsagaanburgas (Mongolian: Цагаанбургас)
