= Agbash (island) =

Biggest island on the Khar Us lake

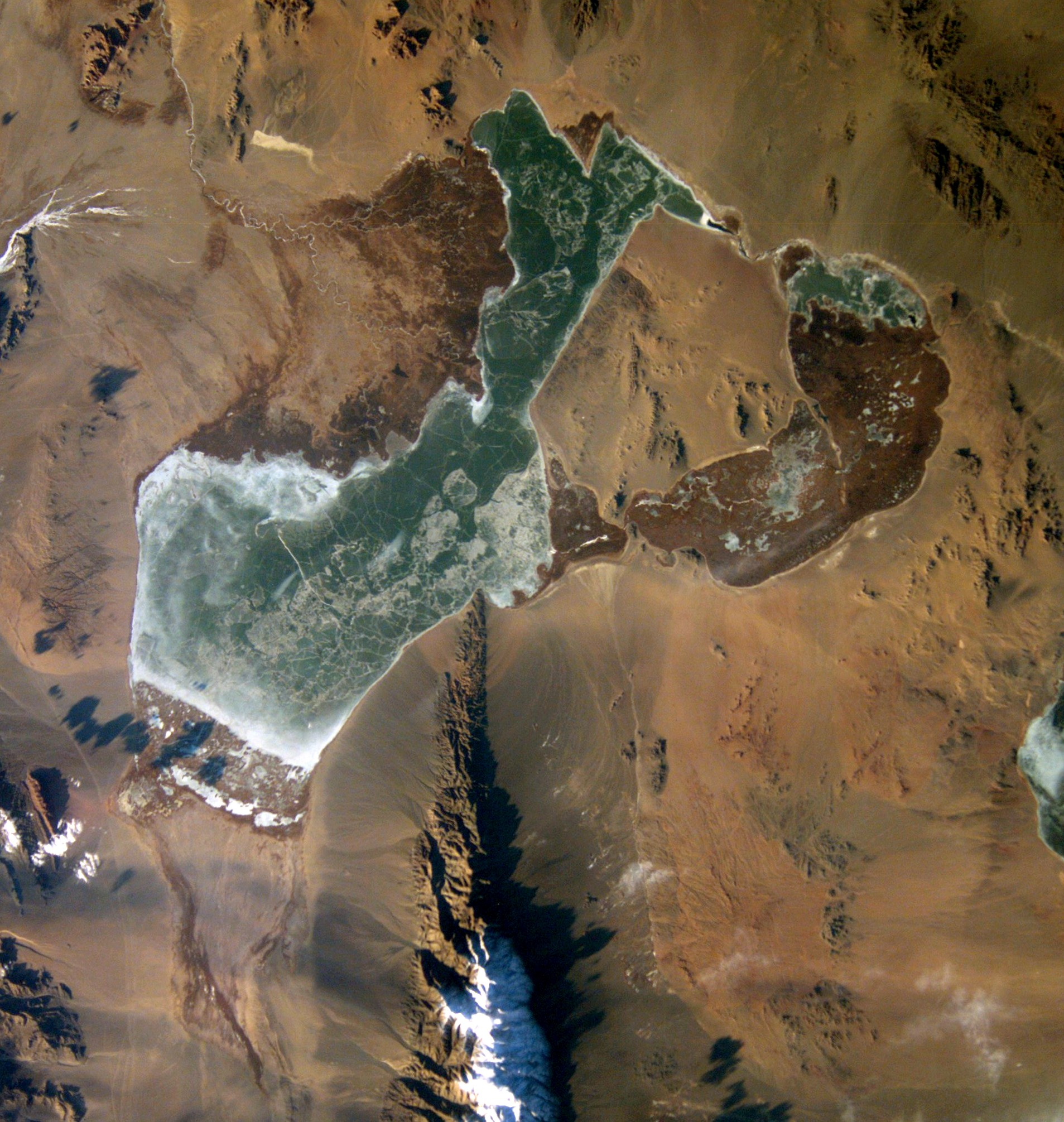
2002 picture of the lake taken from space and rotated

Agbash (or Ak-Bashi (Mongolian: Ак-Баши, white head) is the biggest of over 20 islands on the Khar Us lake in Khovd Province of Mongolia. It is 30 km long and has an area of 274 sq kilometers. The reed-covered island divides the lake into north and south.
