= Khovd River =

River in Mongolia

Coordinates: 48.1529°N 92.3123°E

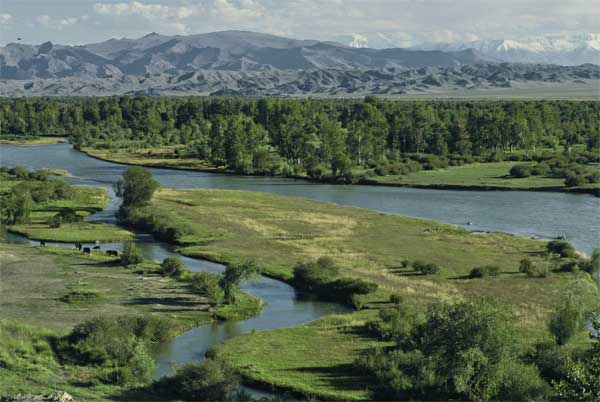
- Native name: Ховд гол (Mongolian)

Location
- Country: Mongolia
- Aimags: Khovd, Bayan-Ölgii
- Major city: Khovd

Physical characteristics
- Source: glaciers
  - location: Tavan Bogd mountain
- Mouth: Khar-Us Lake in Great Lakes Depression
  - location: Dörgön, Khovd
- Length: 516 km (321 mi)

Khovd River (Mongolian: Ховд гол, romanized: Khovd gol, IPA: [χɔ́ɸt ɢɔɬ]) is a river in western Mongolia. It flows from Tavan Bogd mountain of the Altai Mountains in Bayan-Ölgii Province to Khar-Us Lake. The length of the river is 516 kilometres.

== See also ==
- List of rivers of Mongolia
