= Altai, Khovd =

District in Khovd Province, Mongolia

Coordinates: 45°48′28″N 92°17′30″E

Altai District Алтай сум ᠠᠯᠲᠠᠢᠰᠤᠮᠤ
- District
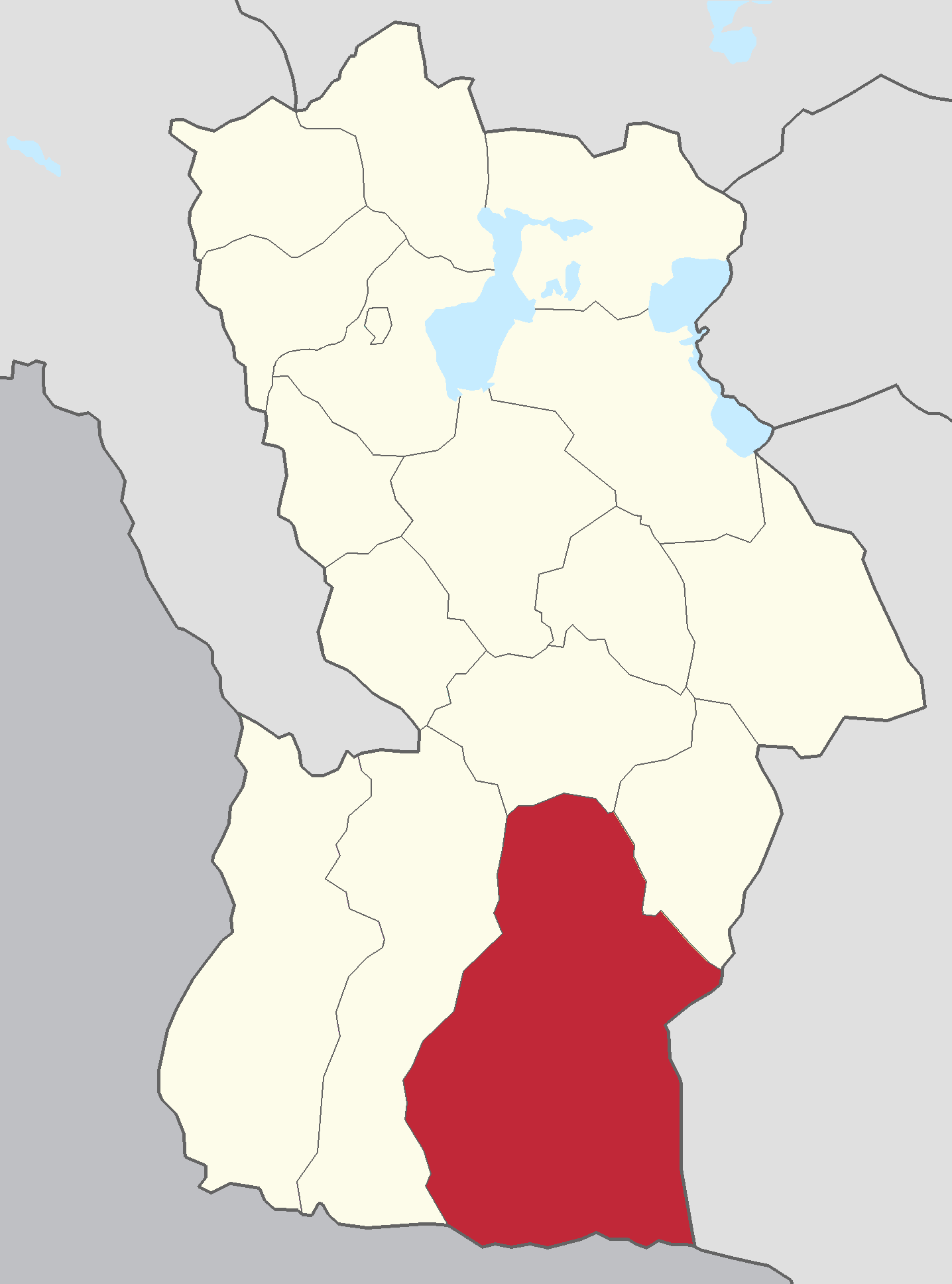
- Altai District in Khovd Province
- Country: Mongolia
- Province: Khovd Province

Area
  - Total: 13,144 km^{2} (5,075 sq mi)
- Time zone: UTC+7 (UTC + 7)
- Website: http://altai.kho.gov.mn/

Altai (Mongolian: Алтай) is a sum (district) of Khovd Province in western of Mongolia. It is 310 km away from the city of Khovd.

== History ==
In 1968 a research team investigated 31 monuments dated to the Bronze and Early Iron Age near the border of Altai and Üyench sums.

== Geography ==
At a total area of 13,144 km^{2}, the district is the largest by area in the province. It is also the southern most district in the province.

== Administrative divisions ==
The district is divided into four bags, which are:

- Altangadas
- Barlag
- Bodonch
- Takhilt
