= Sangiin Kherem =

Manchu fort remains in Mongolia

Coordinates: 48°00′45″N 91°38′28″E

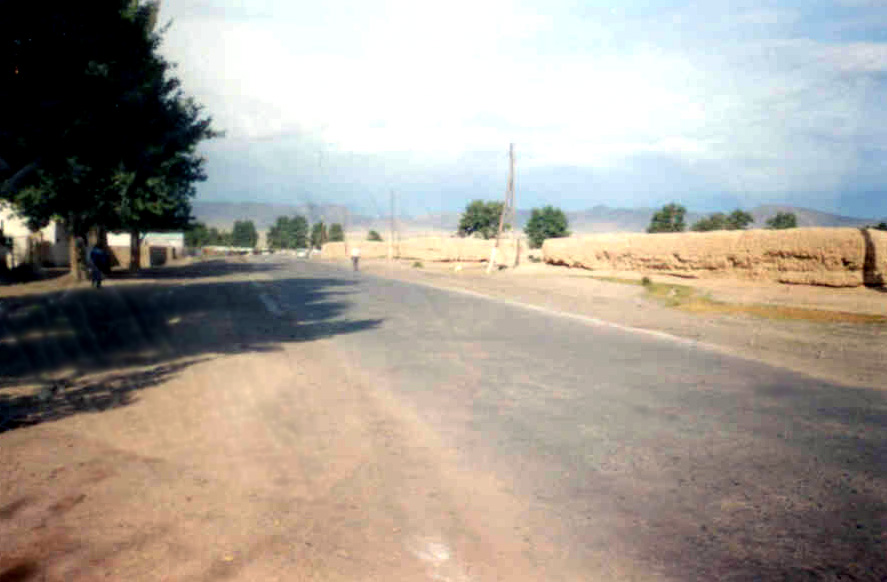
Sangiin Kherem in modern-day Khovd city

Sangiin Kherem (Mongolian: Сангийн хэрэм) is the Mongolian name for the remains of the Qing dynasty fort in the northern part of Khovd city, in modern-day Mongolia.

The fort was built in the 18th century, and later became the seat of the Qing amban and his office. The fort has a quadratic layout, the walls are made of clay. There were gates at the east and west and watch towers at the four corners. The fort's walls were surrounded by water ditches, with wooden bridges to access the gates. The remaining walls are 3 metres high and 1.5 metres thick, oriented at the four corners of the earth, each side was 0.33 km. According to Russian geographer M. V. Pevtsov, who visited the city in 1878, the height of the walls back then was 4.5 metres. The southern portion of the fort was occupied by the Manchu amban, treasury, offices, and military barracks. The eastern part was occupied by commercial firms, a Chinese Buddhist temple and a mosque. Following the independence of Outer Mongolia from Qing China and the fort was taken by force, the citadel declined.

== See also ==
- Khovd (city)
