= Möst, Khovd =

District in Khovd Province, Mongolia

Coordinates: 46°41′36″N 92°47′39″E

Möst District Мөст сум ᠮᠥᠰᠦᠲᠦᠰᠤᠮᠤ
- District
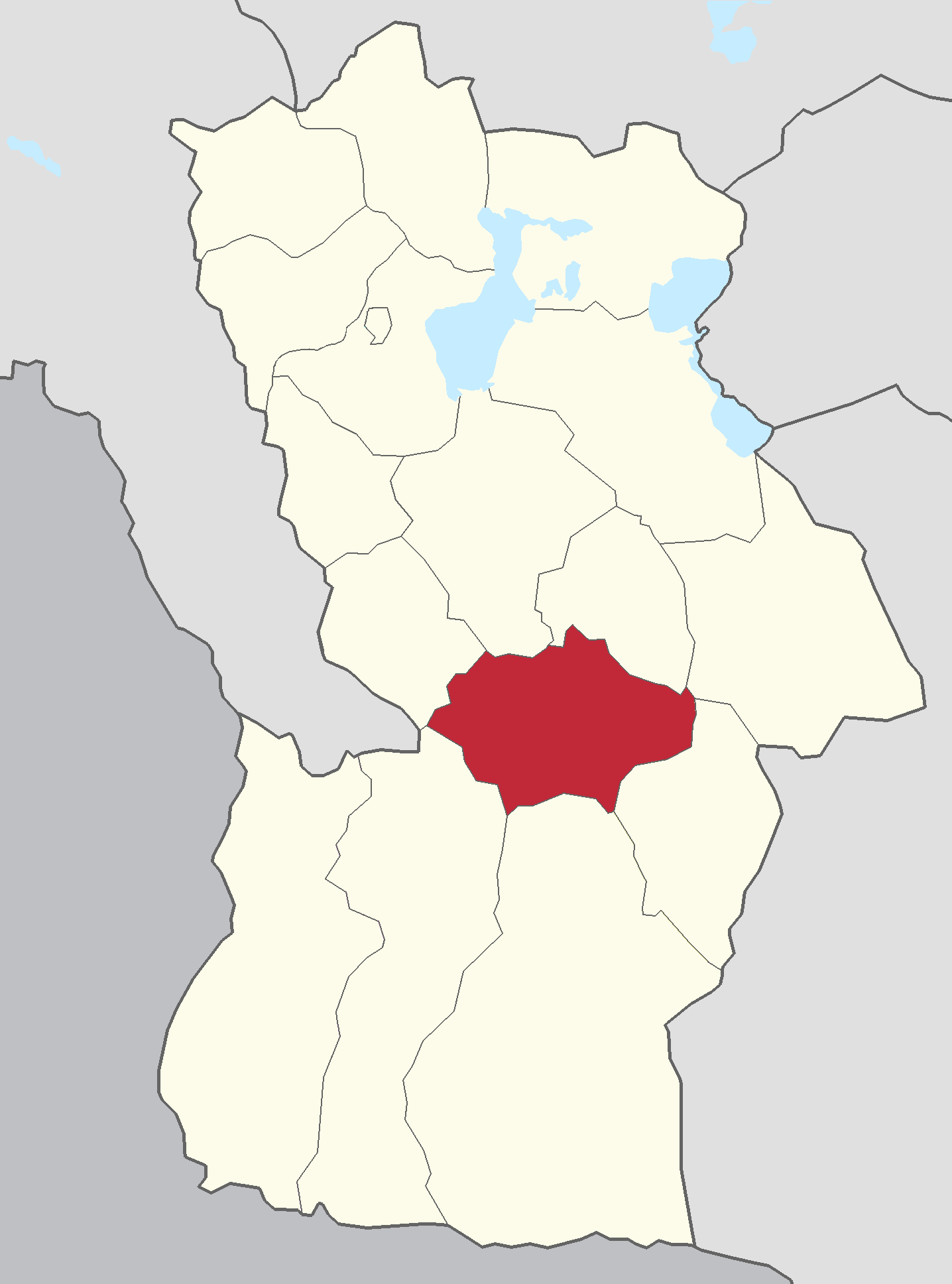
- Möst District in Khovd Province
- Country: Mongolia
- Province: Khovd Province

Area
  - Total: 3,927 km^{2} (1,516 sq mi)
- Time zone: UTC+7 (UTC + 7)

Möst (Mongolian: Мөст) is a sum (district) of Khovd Province in western Mongolia. The sum is 180 km away from the city of Khovd.

== Administrative divisions ==
The district is divided into five bags, which are:

- Bayankhairkhan
- Davst
- Khujirt
- Tsetseg gol
- Ulaantolgoi
