= Mönkhkhairkhan, Khovd =

District in Khovd Province, Mongolia

Coordinates: 47°03′41″N 91°51′09″E

Mönkhkhairkhan District Мөнххайрхан сум ᠮᠥᠩᠬᠡᠬᠠᠶᠢᠷᠬᠠᠨᠰᠤᠮᠤ
- District
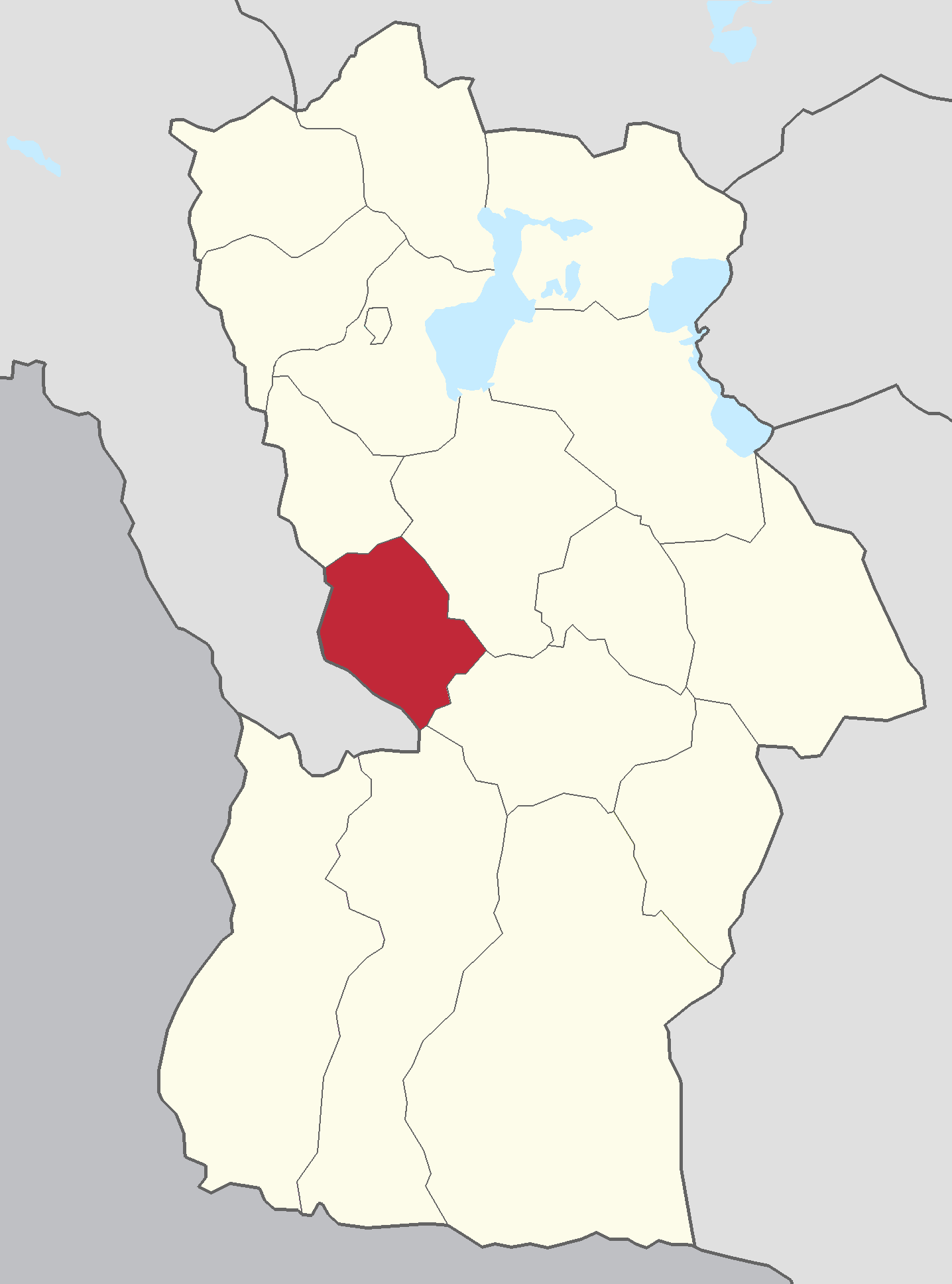
- Mönkhkhairkhan District in Khovd Province
- Country: Mongolia
- Province: Khovd Province

Area
  - Total: 2,554 km^{2} (986 sq mi)
- Time zone: UTC+7 (UTC + 7)

Mönkhkhairkhan (Mongolian: Мөнххайрхан) is a sum (district) of Khovd Province in western Mongolia. It is named after Mount Mönkhkhairkhan. The sum is 155 km away from the city of Khovd.

== Administrative divisions ==
The district is divided into four bags, which are:

- Alag
- Bort
- Khag
- Senkher
