= Altai Uriankhai =

Ethnic group native to western Mongolia

ᠠᠯᠲᠠᠢ ᠶᠢᠨ ᠤᠷᠢᠶᠠᠩᠬᠠᠢ
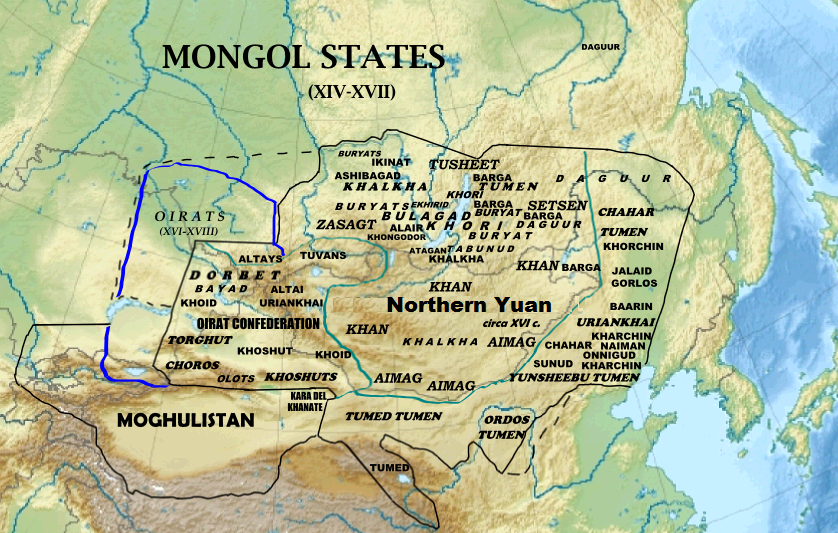
- Location of the Altai Uriankhai

Regions with significant populations
- Mongolia: 26,654

Languages
- Oirat, Mongolian

Religion
- Tibetan Buddhism, Mongolian shamanism

Related ethnic groups
- Mongols, especially Oirats

The Altai Uriankhai (Mongolian: Алтайн Урианхай; simplified Chinese: 阿尔泰乌梁海; traditional Chinese: 阿爾泰烏梁海) refers to a Mongol tribe around the Altai Mountains that was organized by the Qing dynasty. They now form a subgroup in western Mongolia and eastern Xinjiang.

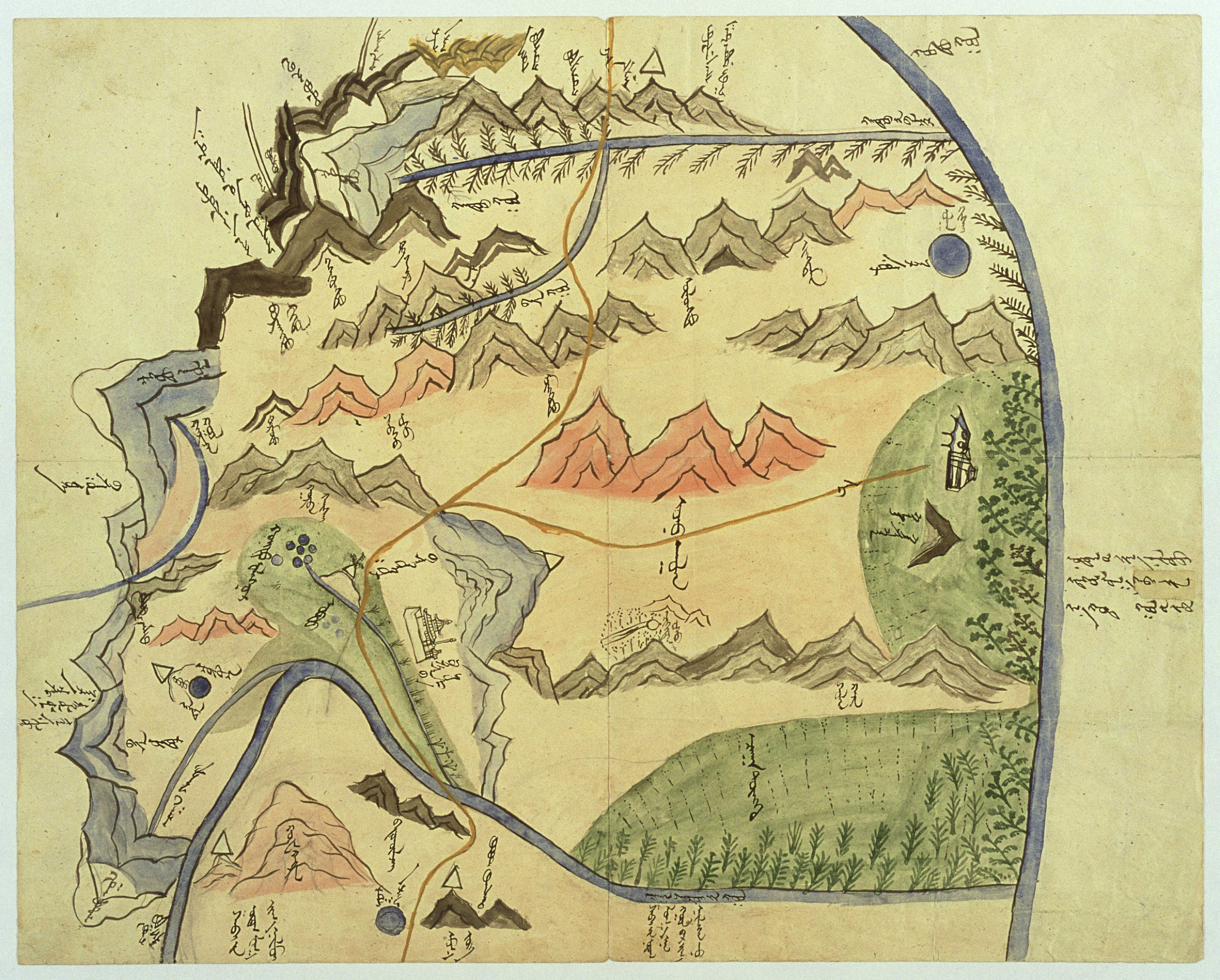
Map of the Jütgelt Gün's hoshuu (banner) of the Altai Urianhai in western Mongolia.

The Uriankhai people first appeared in the 7th century as one of the people in Mongolia (Legend of the Erkune kun). The Mongolian term Uriankhai had been applied to all Samoyedic, Turkic, and Mongolic peoples to the north-west of Mongolia in the 17th century. The Uriyangkhai, in this sense, were first subjugated by the Khotgoid, the Khalkha, and then by the Dzungars.

In the mid 14th century, they lived in the Liaoyang province of modern China. After the rebellion of the northern Uriankhai people, they were conquered by Dayan Khan in 1538 and mostly annexed by the northern Khalkha.

The second group of the Uriankhai people (Uriankhai of the Khentii Mountains) lived in central Mongolia, and they started moving to the Altai Mountains in the beginning of the 16th century. Some groups migrated to Khövsgöl Province during the course of the Northern Yuan dynasty (1368-1691).

With the fall of the Dzungar Khanate, the Qing dynasty, in 1757, organized the far northern frontier into a series of Uriankhai banners: the Khövsgöl Nuur Uriankhai, Tannu Uriankhai, Kemchik, Salchak, Toju, and Altan-nuur Uriankhai.

In the Altai Range, 7 Altai Uriankhai banners were established into two wings attached to Qing ambans. Their territory included eastern Khovd Province and Khövsgöl Province. Most were Oirat Mongolian speakers with Oirat, Buriat, or Mongolian clan names, but some were Tuvan speakers.

In the aftermath of the Dungan Revolt (1864–77), the Kazakhs migrated into the territory of the Altai Uriankhai. In 1906, the Qing court transferred the Altai Uriankhai banner from Khovd's jurisdiction to the new Altai region, with its capital in Chenghua (present-day Altay City). In 1913, the district was divided between the Bogd Khanate of Mongolia and the Chinese province of Xinjiang, leaving some Uriankhais in far northwestern Xinjiang. The Altai Uriankhai in Mongolia were attached to the Dörbet. However, the Altai Uriankhai and the Kazakhs formed the Bayan-Ölgii Province in 1940. Notable Altai Uriankhai people include B. Damchaa, the movie actor and the specialist in Esperanto of Mongolia.
