= Alasha dialect =

Mongolic variety of Inner Mongolia, China

Alasha
- Pronunciation: [ɑɮʃɑ]
- Native to: China
- Region: Alxa League, Inner Mongolia
- Native speakers: >40,000 (2005)
- Language family: Mongolic: Central Mongolic; Buryat–Mongolian; Mongolian; Oirat; Alasha
- Dialects: Alasha; Eǰene

Language codes
- ISO 639-3: –
- Glottolog: alas1256 Alasha Oirad
- IETF: xal-u-sd-cnnm29

Alasha ([ɑɮʃɑ], in some Mongolian varieties [ɑɮɑ̆ɡʃɑ]; Mongolian script: ᠠᠯᠠᠱᠠ, Mongolian Cyrillic: Алшаа Alaša, Chinese: 阿拉善; pinyin: Ālāshàn), or Alaša-Eǰen-e, is a Mongolic variety with features of both Oirat and Mongolian that historically used to belong to Oirat but has come under the influence of Mongolian proper. It has more than 40,000 speakers in Alxa League, Inner Mongolia, China and consists of two sub-dialects, Alasha proper and Eǰene.

== Classification ==
Alasha was initially classified as an Oirat language, but has lost many of these features in a process known as de-Oiratization.

== Phonology ==
Alasha shows characteristic features of Oirat, such as preservation of /k/ in some contexts and imperative suffixes. However, it also has several features more typical of Khalkha or some Inner Mongolian dialects, such /j/ in place of Oirat /z/ and some forms of personal pronouns.

== Literature ==
- Sečenbaγatur, Qasgerel, Tuyaγ-a, B. ǰirannige, U Ying ǰe (2005): Mongγul kelen-ü nutuγ-un ayalγun-u sinǰilel-ün uduridqal. Kökeqota: Öbür mongγul-un arad-un keblel-ün qoriy-a.
- Söngrüb (1988): Alaša aman ayalγun-u abiyalaburi bolun barimǰiy-a abiyal-un abiyalaburi-yin qaričaγulul. In: Erdem sinǰilegen-ü ögülel-ün teüberi 1. Beijing, ündüsüten-ü keblel-ün qoriy-a: 160-197.
- Svantesson, Jan-Olof, Anna Tsendina, Anastasia Karlsson, Vivan Franzén (2005): The Phonology of Mongolian. New York: Oxford University Press.
