= Khovd, Khovd =

District in Khovd Province, Mongolia

Coordinates: 48°07′27″N 91°22′30″E

Khovd District Ховд сум ᠬᠣᠪᠳᠤᠰᠤᠮᠤ
- District
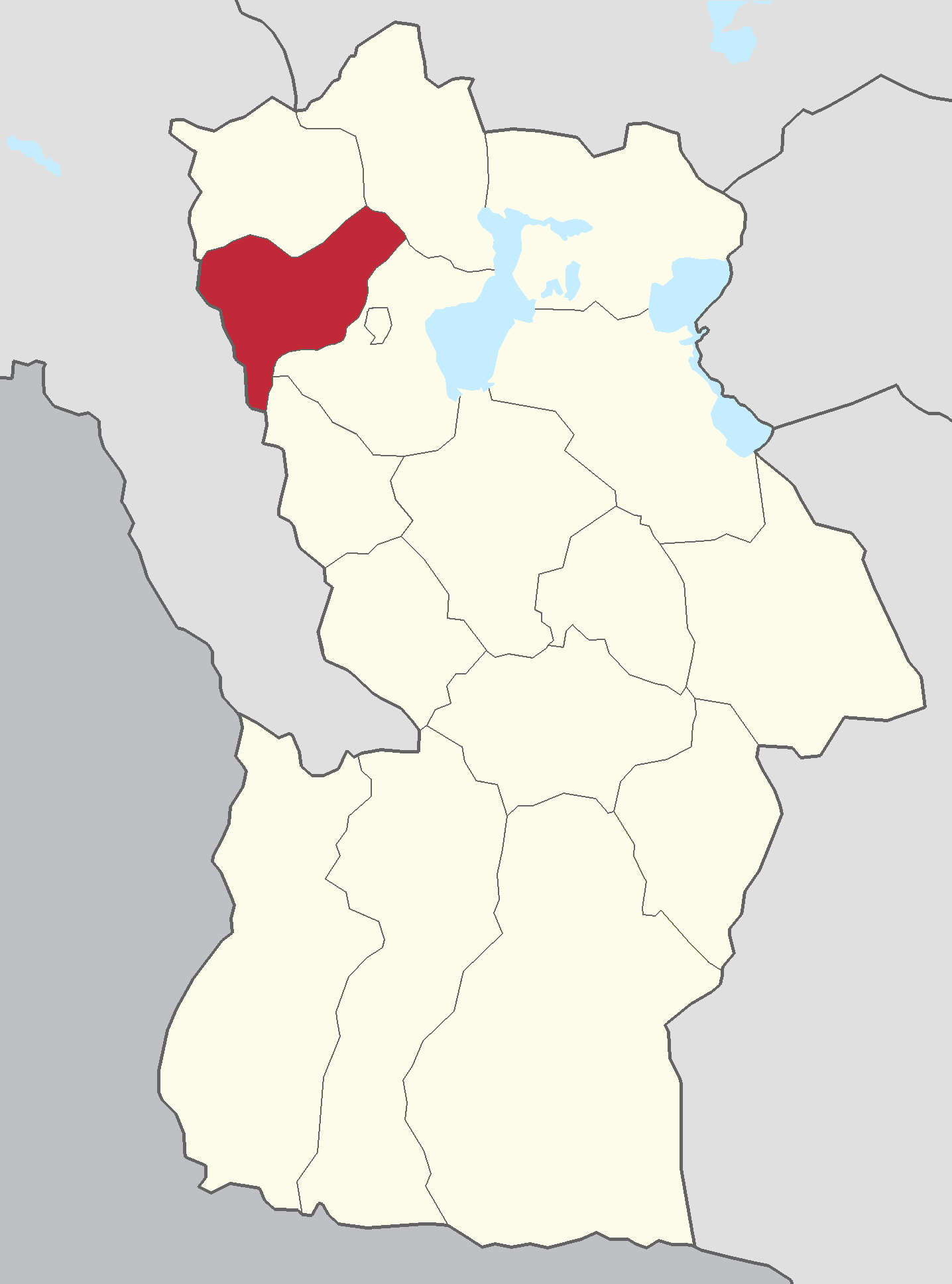
- Khovd District in Khovd Province
- Country: Mongolia
- Province: Khovd Province
- Time zone: UTC+7 (UTC + 7)

Khovd (Mongolian: Ховд) is a sum (district) of Khovd Province in Western Mongolia.

== Population ==
In 2005, 4,644 inhabitants and 866 households lived in Khovd sum. It is the only sum in the Khovd aimag with a majority of Kazakh. 96% of the population belongs to Kazakh nationality and the remaining belong to other ethnic and national groups, like Chantuu (Uyghur, Uzbek), Myangad, Torguud or Khalkh. The total population increased until 1991 and declined sharply in 1992 and 1993. This decline was caused by the outmigration of Kazakhs to Kazakhstan (approx. 1,650 or 33% of total population). In the following years, some migrants returned and the population increased also due to comparably high birth rates. In recent years, the population decreased again, caused by net outmigration. In recent article published in Xinjiang Uyghur Autonomous Region of China, there are still some Uyghur people living in Khovd.

== Administrative divisions ==
The district is divided into five bags, which are:

- Baruun Salaa
- Bayanbulag
- Dund Us
- Tsagaanburgas
- Ulaanburaa
