= Ağbaş, Shabran =

Human settlement in Azerbaijan

Coordinates: 41°07′N 49°06′E

Ağbaş, or Ağbash, is a village and municipality in the Davachi or Siazan Rayon of Azerbaijan. It has a population of 1,751.

== Notable natives ==
- Samir Zulfugarov — National Hero of Azerbaijan.
