= Erdenebüren =

District in Khovd Province, Mongolia

Coordinates: 48°30′13″N 91°27′05″E

Erdenebüren District Эрдэнэбүрэн сум ᠵᠡᠷᠭᠡ ᠰᠤᠮᠤ
- District
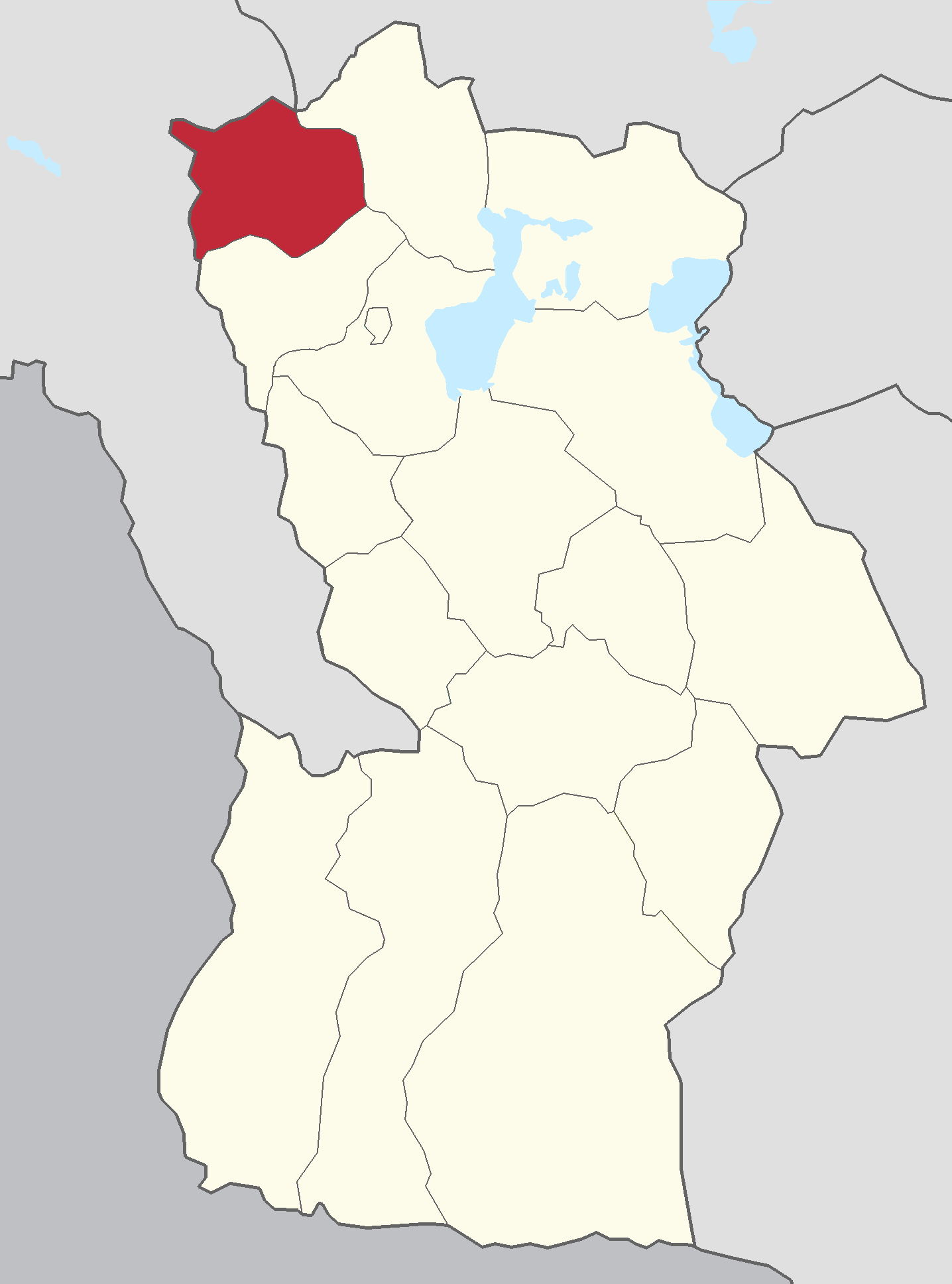
- Erdenebüren District in Khovd Province
- Country: Mongolia
- Province: Khovd Province

Area
  - Total: 2,772 km^{2} (1,070 sq mi)
- Time zone: UTC+7 (UTC + 7)
- Website: http://erdeneburen.kho.gov.mn/

Erdenebüren (Mongolian: Эрдэнэбүрэн) is a sum (district) of Khovd Province in western Mongolia. It is 60 km away from the city of Khovd.

== Administrative divisions ==
The district is divided into five bags, which are:

- Bayangol (Mongolian: Баянгол)
- Khar Us (Mongolian: Хар-Ус)
- Khongio (Mongolian: Хонгио)
- Namarjin (Mongolian: Намарзан)
- Shurag (Mongolian: Шураг)
