= Zakhchin =

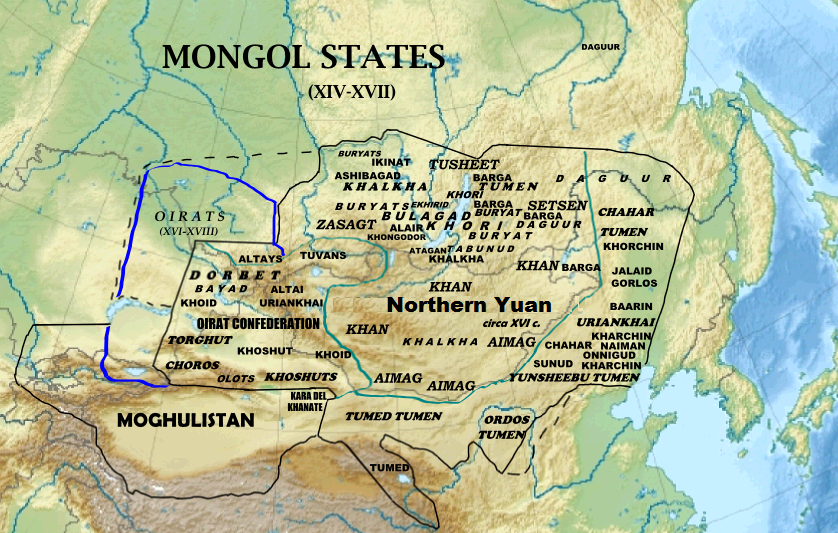
- Location of the Zakhchin

Total population
- 32,845

Regions with significant populations
- Mongolia: 32,845

Languages
- Oirat language

Religion
- Tibetan Buddhism, Mongolian shamanism

Related ethnic groups
- Mongols, especially Oirats

The Zakhchin (Mongolian: Захчин) is a subgroup of the Oirats residing in Khovd Province, Mongolia. Zakhchin means 'Frontiersmen'. They are so called because they originated from the border garrison (mainly from Torghut, Dorbet Oirat, and Dzungar) of the Dzungar Khanate. They originally spoke the Zakhchin dialect of the Oirat language, but actually pure Oirat language is used by elder generations, younger generations use a dialect being under a strong Khalkha influence.

== History ==
The Zakhchins were conquered by the Manchus of the Qing dynasty in 1754 and controlled by Zasagt Khan aimag's Tsevdenjav gün, then moved to Zereg and Shar Khulsan. One Banner with 4(+1) sums were designated for them and noble Maamad (Mamuud) zaisan became the chieftain but Mamuud killed by Zungharian king Amarsanaa later and the Zakhchins revolted together with Amursana against the Qing.

The sums were:

- Bichgiin meeren's sum (in modern Mankhan, Khovd province)
- Güüj zan's sum (in modern Altai and part of Must, Khovd province)
- Baljinnyam zahiragch sum (in modern Zereg and parts of Mankhan in Khovd province)
- Jantsandorj's sum or Hoit (North) sum (in modern Mankhan, Khovd province)
- Guniikhen (in modern Uyench, Khovd province)

Administrative center was in Hoit sum's Tögrög Hüree.

During the Bogd Khanate of Mongolia, Zakhchin was subject to Dörbet Ünen Zorigt Khan aimag. The south Banner is called Goviinkhon "people of the Gobi", while the north was called the Shiliinkhen "people of the mountain range".

== Clans ==
Zakhchin has 16 tamga (seal) and 30 clans. Some of them are:

- Donjooniikhon
- Damjaaniikhan
- Shurdaankhan
- Baykhiinkhan
- Emchiinkhen
- Khereid
- Tsagaan Yas
- Aatiinkhan
- Dumiyenkhen
- Burd Tariachin
- Adsagiinkhan
- Tavagzaaniikhan
- Nokhoikhon
- Khotonguud
- Khurmshtiinkhan
- Mukhlainkhan

== Number ==
The Zakhchin numbered 29,800 in 2000.

== Famous Zakhchins in modern Mongolia ==
- Tsakhiagiin Elbegdorj, who is a former President of Mongolia
- Damdingiin Demberel, who is a former speaker of State Parliament
- Rinchinnyamyn Amarjargal, who is a former Prime Minister of Mongolia

== Literature ==
- [hamagmongol.narod.ru/library/khoyt_2008_r.htm Хойт С.К. Антропологические характеристики калмыков по данным исследователей XVIII-XIX вв. // Вестник Прикаспия: археология, история, этнография. No. 1. Элиста: Изд-во КГУ, 2008. с. 220–243.]
- [hamagmongol.narod.ru/library/khoyt_2012_r.htm Хойт С.К. Калмыки в работах антропологов первой половины XX вв. // Вестник Прикаспия: археология, история, этнография. No. 3, 2012. с. 215–245.]

Zakhchiny tüükh soël, öv ulamzhlal. Iadamzhav, ed. Ulaanbaatar : Soëmbo Printing KhKhK, 2014. ISBN 9789996228612
