= Dörgön, Khovd =

District in Khovd Province, Mongolia

Coordinates: 48°19′57″N 92°37′56″E

Dörgön District Дөргөн сум ᠳᠥᠷᠦᠭᠡᠨ ᠰᠤᠮᠤ
- District
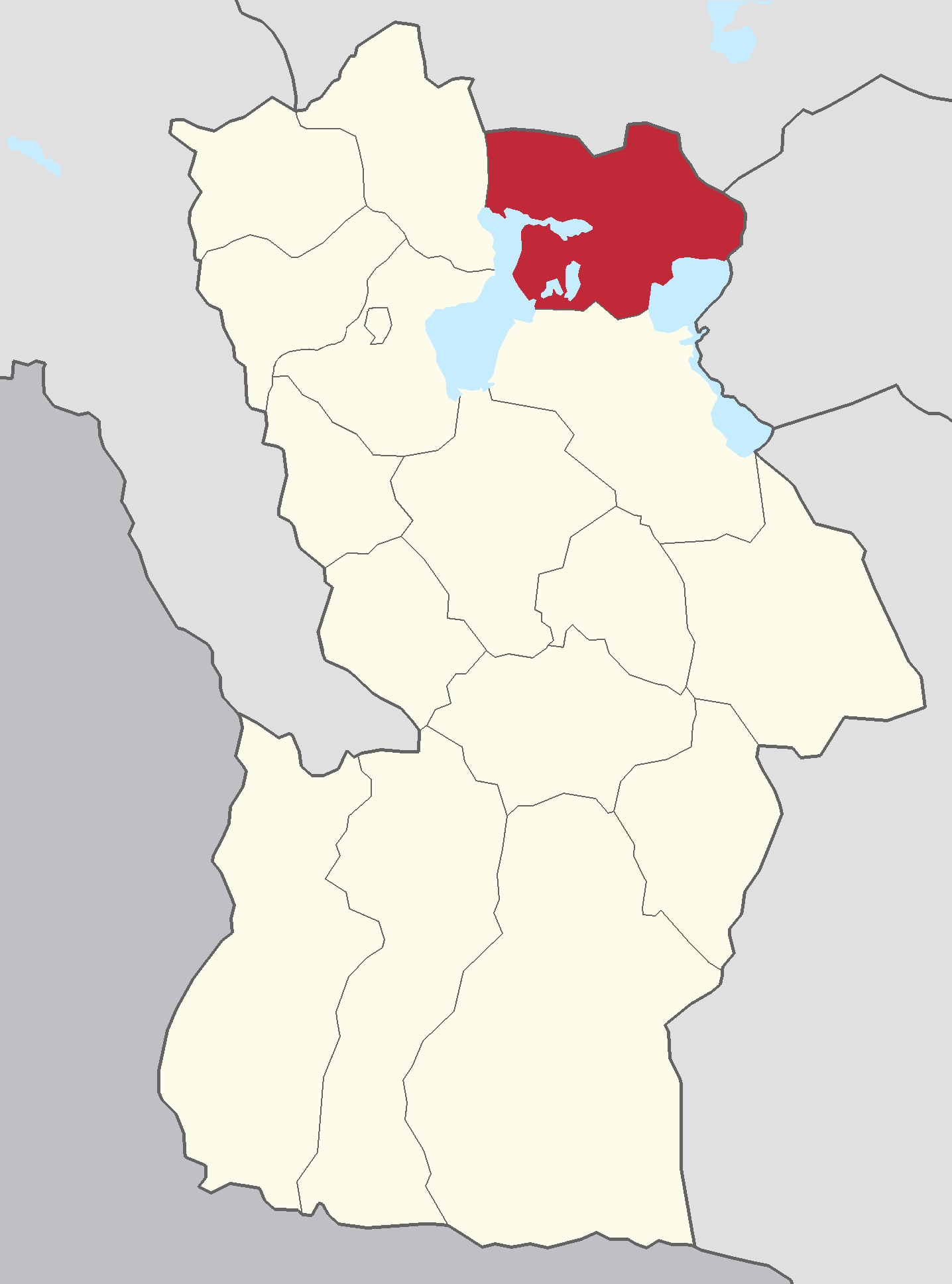
- Dörgön District in Khovd Province
- Country: Mongolia
- Province: Khovd

Area
  - Total: 4,128 km^{2} (1,594 sq mi)
- Time zone: UTC+7 (UTC + 7)
- Website: http://durgun.kho.gov.mn/

Dörgön (Mongolian: Дөргөн) is a sum (district) of Khovd Province in western Mongolia. It is 106 km away from the city of Khovd.

== Administrative divisions ==
The district is divided into four bags, which are:

- Agvash
- Argalant
- Seer
- Uguumur
