= Khovd Province =

Province of Mongolia

Khovd Province Ховд аймаг ᠬᠣᠪᠳᠤᠠᠢᠮᠠᠭ
- Province
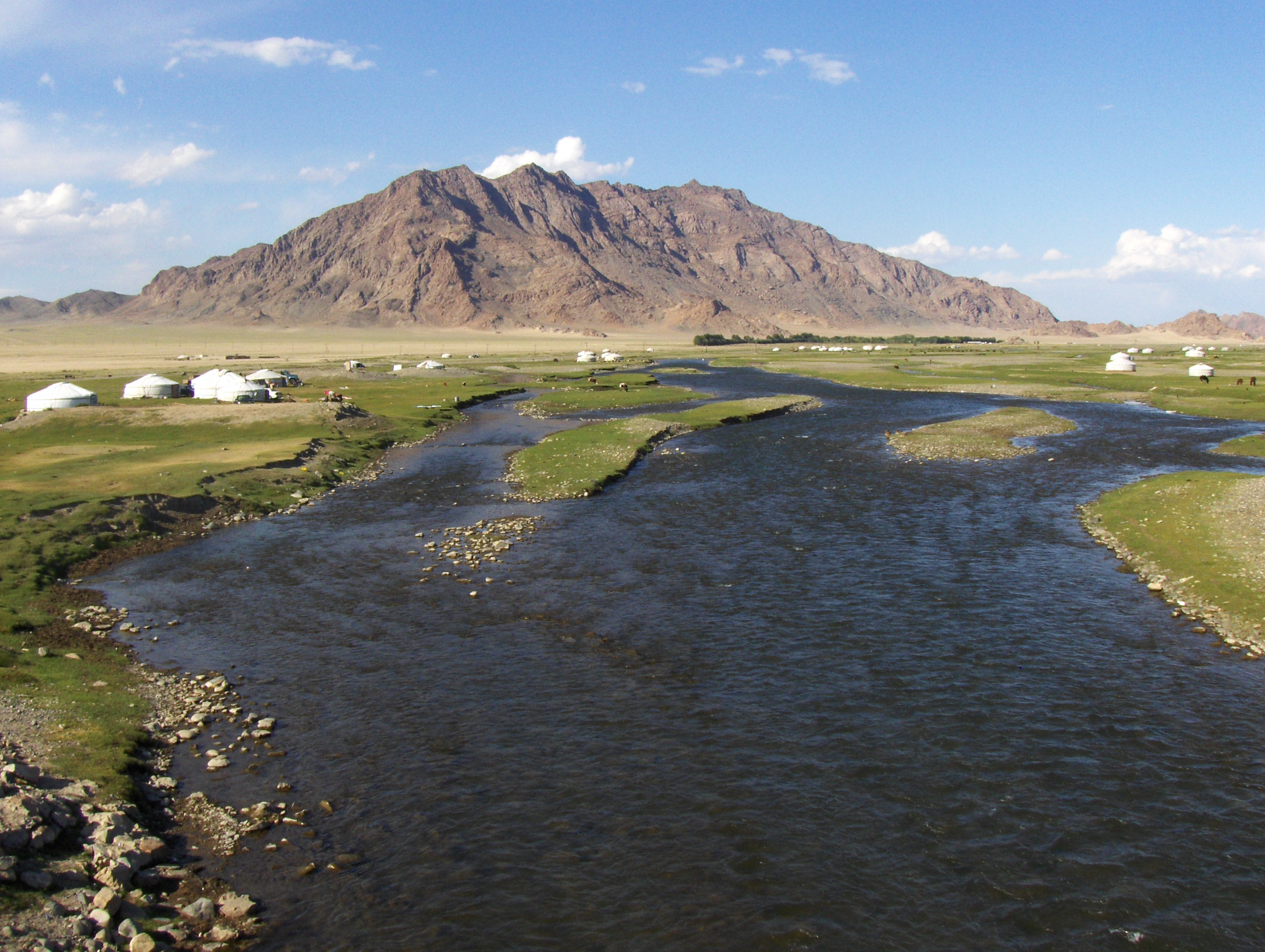
- Buyant River

- Flag Coat of arms

- Coordinates: 47°0′N 92°45′E
- Country: Mongolia
- Established: 1931
- Capital: Khovd

Government

Area
  - Total: 76,133.38 km^{2} (29,395.26 sq mi)
- Highest elevation: 4,204 m (13,793 ft)

Population (2025)
  - Total: 89,966
  - Density: 1.1817/km^{2} (3.0606/sq mi)

GDP
  - Total: MNT 975 billion US$ 0.3 billion (2022)
  - Per capita: MNT 21,692,300; US$ 3,448 (2022)
- Time zone: UTC+7
- Area code: +976 (0)143
- ISO 3166 code: MN-043
- Vehicle registration: ХО_
- Website: khovd.gov.mn

Khovd (/kɒvd/; Mongolian: Ховд [ˈχɔɸt]), alternatively romanized as Khobhd, is one of the twenty-one aimags (provinces) of Mongolia, located in the west of the country. Its capital is also named Khovd. Khovd province is approximately 1,580 km (980 mi) from Ulaanbaatar, Mongolia's capital. It takes its name from the Khovd River, which is located in this province.

== Population ==
Khovd is distinguished by its multi-cultural population. It is home to more than 17 nationalities and ethnicities. Each of these groups has its own distinct traditional dwelling and settlement pattern, dress and other cultural distinctions, literary, artistic, and musical traditions. Islam is a significant religion practiced by around 10–15% of the population, namely the Kazakhs and a small minority of Uyghurs.

Ethnic groups of Khovd aimag national censuses data
Ethnic group	Mongolian name	1979	%	1989	%	2000	%
Khalkha	Халх	17,343	27.72	20,397	26.64	23,832	27.45
Zakhchin	Захчин	14,464	23.12	17,228	22.50	21,645	24.93
Kazakh	Хасаг	9,425	15.06	12,814	16.74	10,005	11.52
Torguud	Торгууд	5,566	8.90	6,703	8.76	6,995	8.06
Olots	Өөлд	4,823	7.71	5,622	7.34	6,503	7.49
Altai Uriankhai	Урианхай	4,587	7.33	5,403	7.06	6,592	7.59
Dörvöd	Дөрвөд	2,856	4.56	3,609	4.71	5,242	6.04
Myangad	Мянгад	2,855	4.56	3,517	4.59	4,287	4.94
Tuvan	Тува	-	-	239	0.31	724	0.83
Bayad	Баяд	129	0.21	227	0.30	377	0.43
Chantuu	Чантуу	183	0.29	187	0.24	258	0.30
Khoshuud	Хошууд	-	-	-	-	149	0.17
Other Mongolian citizens		93	0.15	176	0.23	203	0.23
Foreigners		241	0.39	431	0.56	19	0.02
Total		62,565	100.00	76,553	100.00	86,831	100.00

The Khovd aimag population growth stopped in 1991, then migration out of the aimag (approx. 20,000 in 1992-2004) compensated the natural increase and confined aimag's population within the limits of 87 thousand to 92 thousand since.

Khovd aimag population
1956 census	1960 est.	1969 census	1979 census	1981 est.	1989 census	1995 est.	2000 census	2006 census	2010 census
42,300	48,000	54,000	62,600	64,500	86,831	88,494	89,326	92,395	82, 204

== Climate ==
Khovd is notorious for its harsh weather, for temperatures regularly reach as high as 40 °C or 104 °F during summer and as low as −30 °C or −22 °F during winter. The climate is dry, as it receives approximately the same average annual precipitation as Phoenix, Arizona.

=== Rivers ===
The major rivers are:

- Khovd River
- Bulgan River
- Buyant River
- Hoid tsenher River
- Dund tsenher River
- Uench River
- Bodonch River

=== Lakes ===
- Khar-Us Lake
- Khar Lake
- Dörgön Lake
- Tsetseg Lake

=== Mountains ===
- Altai Mountains
  - Jargalant hairhan
  - Bumbat hairhan
  - Baatar hairhan
  - Monkh hairhan
  - Baitag bogd

== Transportation ==
The Khovd Airport (HVD/ZMKD) has two runways, one of which is paved, and gets served by regular flights from and to Ulaanbaatar, Mörön, and Bulgan. And flights are planned to Ürümqi city of Xinjiang.

== Economy ==
The region around the Khovd city is famous in Mongolia for its watermelon crop. There is a sizable hydroelectric dam-building project underway that will theoretically generate enough electricity to power the three most western aimags (Uvs, Bayan-Ölgii, and Khovd). The city of Khovd is connected to the Russian power grid and subject to blackouts if it falls behind in its payments. Domestic and international tourism and sports hunting are a sizable industry of Khovd province. The natural environment, fresh and salt water lakes, mountains, valleys, caves, ancient rock paintings and fortresses are other sightseeing attractions.

Animal herding is the main economy of this province.

Number of livestock
1950 census	1960 census	1970 census	1980 census	1990 census	2000 census	2005 census	2010 census	2014 census
1,131,733	1,691,934	1,539,574	1,687,703	2,070,622	1,836,272	1,963,712	1,639,100	2,625,577

In 2018, the province contributed to 1.21% of the total national GDP of Mongolia.

== Administrative subdivisions ==
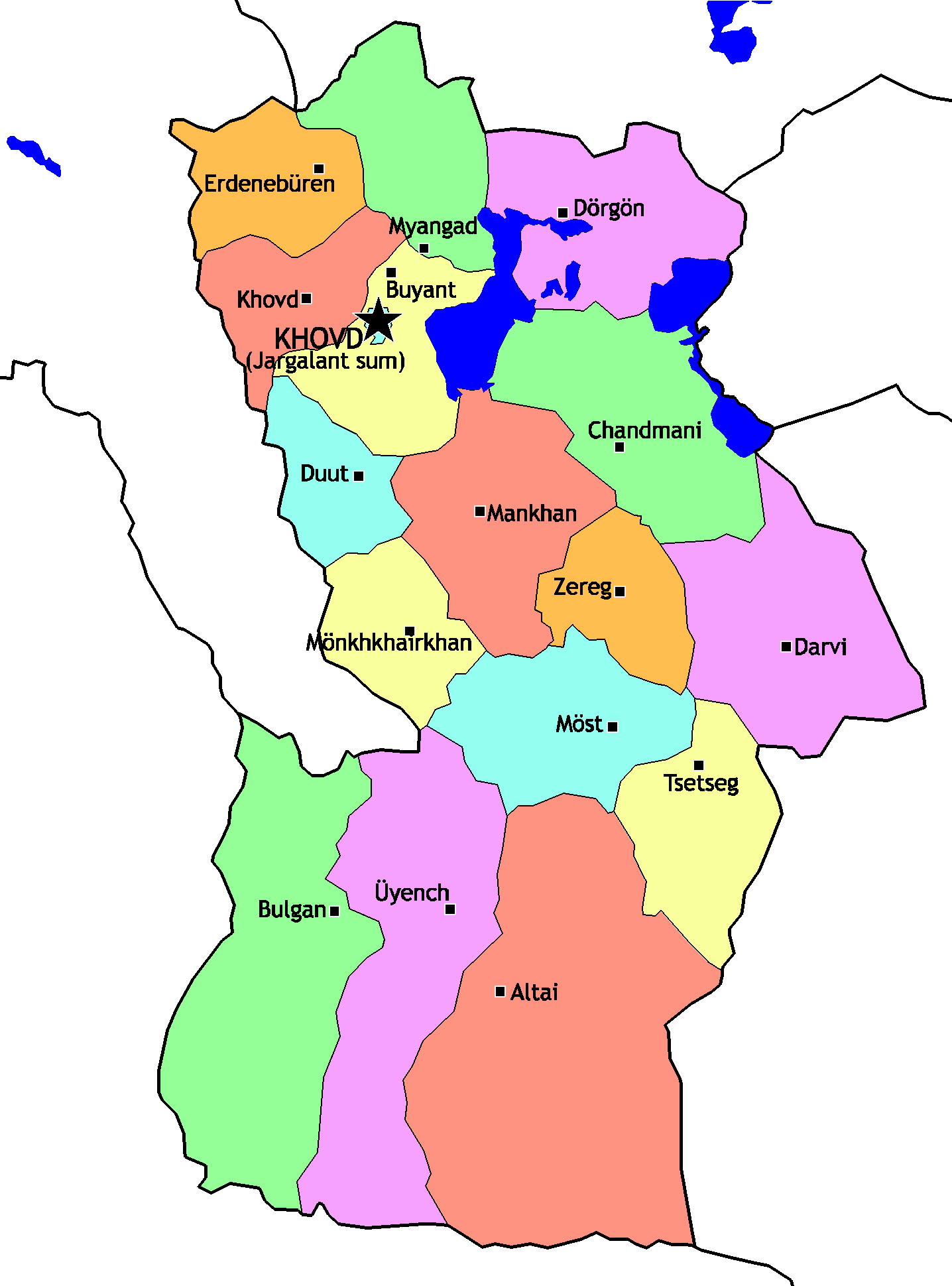
Sums of Khovd Aimag

The aimag capital Khovd is geographically located in the Buyant sum, but is administered as independent Jargalant sum. The administrative center of the Khovd Sum is also called Khovd, which is a common source of confusion. The other administrative centers carry the name of the respective Sum as well.

The sums of Khovd Aimag
Sum	Mongolian	Population 1979 census	Population 1991 est.	Population 2007 est.	Population 2010 est.	Major Ethnic.	Sum Centre Population	Area (km²)	Density (/km²)	Distance from Khovd city(km)
Altai	Алтай	2,141	2,712	3,234	2 849	Zahchin	767	13,144	0.25	310
Bulgan	Булган	7,052	9,169	9,634	8 262	Torguud	3,171	8,104	1.19	335
Buyant	Буянт	3,361	4,386	3,533	2 673	Halh/Tuva	1,568	3,759	0.96	19
Chandmani	Чандмань	2,311	2,963	3,155	2 469	Halh	689	6,016	0.52	160
Darvi	Дарви	2,402	2,775	2,596	2 362	Halh	579	5,604	0.47	204
Dörgön	Дөргөн	1,715	2,555	3,015	2 266	Dorvod	659	4,128	0.73	106
Duut	Дуут	1,675	2,189	2,094	1 287	Urianhai	502	2,146	0.98	76
Erdenebüren	Эрдэнэбүрэн	2,258	3,210	3,372	1 995	Oold	696	2,772	1.22	60
Jargalant*	Жаргалант	17,620	26,877	29,207	29 012	Halh/Mixed	28,601*	70	417.24	0
Khovd	Ховд	3,927	4,850	4,589	2 722	Halh	719	2,830	1.63	27
Mankhan	Манхан	3,273	4,352	4,526	3 480	Zahchin	1,258	4,330	1.05	80
Mönkhkhairkhan	Мөнххайрхан	1,811	2,337	2,554	1 955	Urianhai/Zahchin	744	2,554	1.06	155
Möst	Мөст	3,239	4,092	3,577	2 939	Zahchin	809	3,927	0.91	180
Myangad	Мянгад	2,940	4,552	3,662	2 615	Myangad	713	3,258	1.12	35
Tsetseg	Цэцэг	2,189	2,645	2,531	2 423	Halh	570	3,491	0.72	216
Üyench	Үенч	2,575	3,913	4,760	4 024	Zahchin	1,452	7,476	0.64	305
Zereg	Зэрэг	2,388	3,092	3,078	2 727	Zahchin	796	2,524	1.23	130

^{*} - The aimag capital Khovd
