= Khovd (city) =

Provincial capital of Khovd Province, Mongolia

Khovd Ховд ᠬᠣᠪᠳᠤ
- District and City
- Jargalant District; Жаргалант сум ᠵᠢᠷᠭᠠᠯᠠᠩᠲᠤᠰᠤᠮᠤ
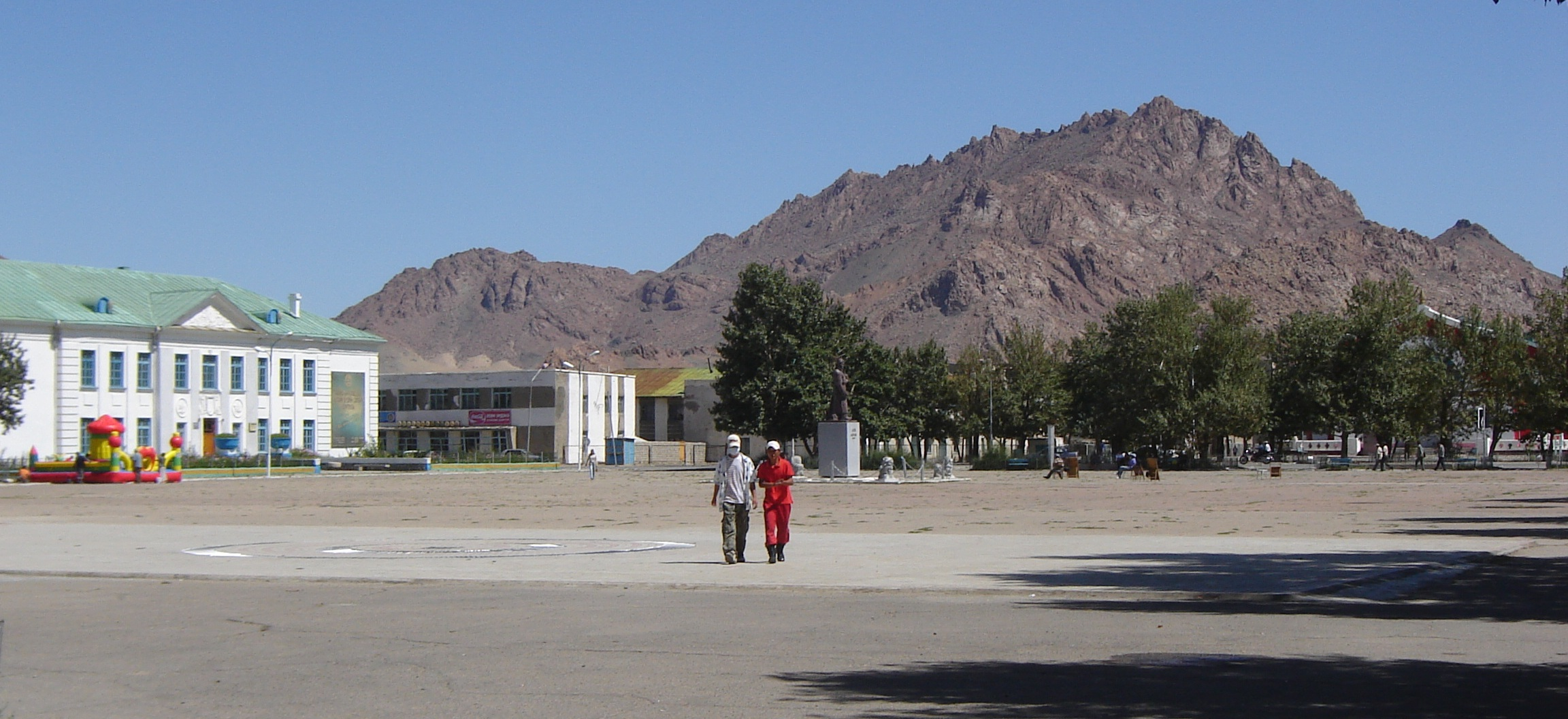
- The city of Khovd

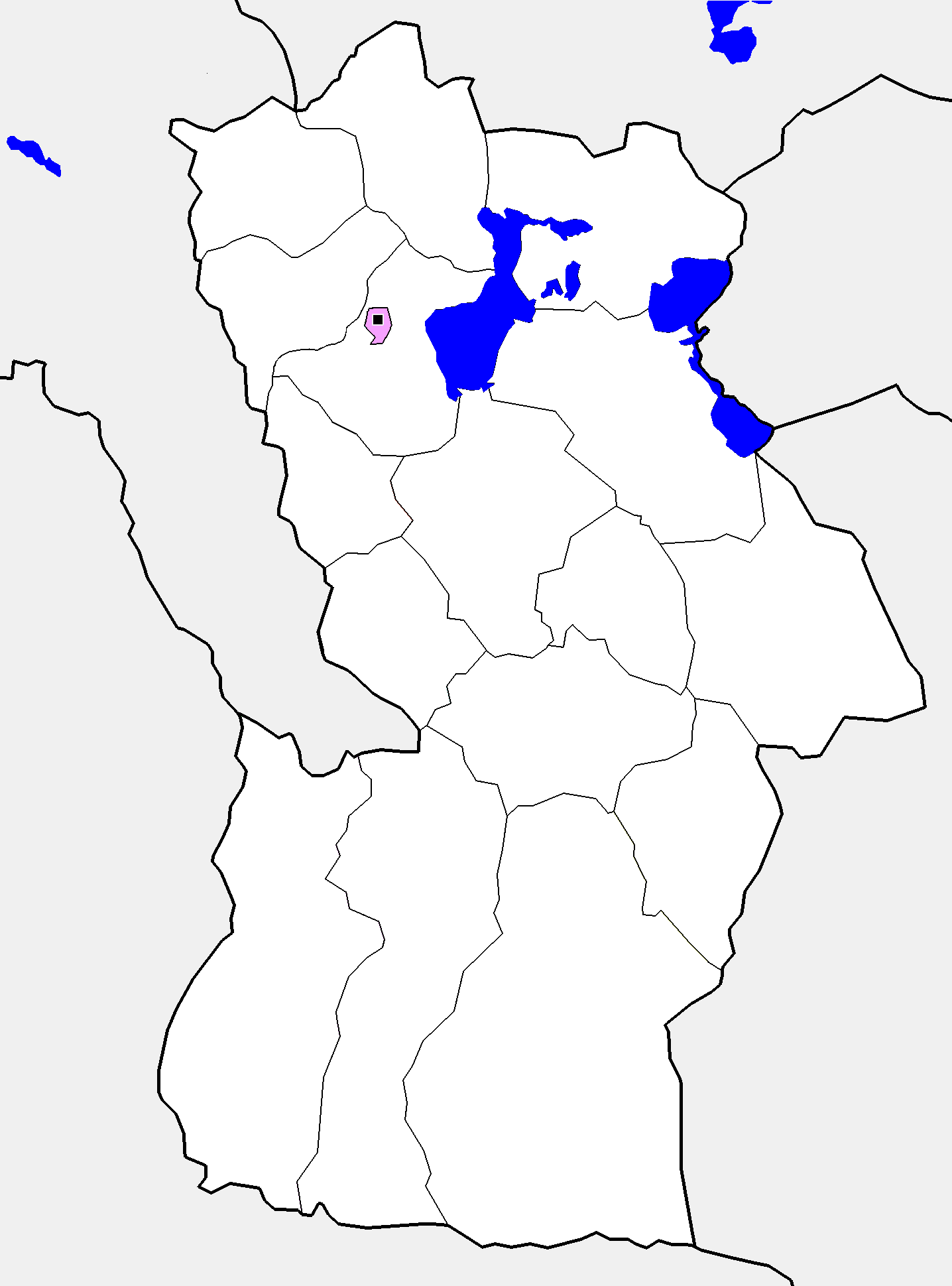
- Khovd City in Khovd Province

- Location within Mongolia
- Coordinates: 48°00′15″N 91°38′26″E
- Country: Mongolia
- Province: Khovd Province
- Founded: 1731

Area
  - Total: 70.0 km^{2} (27.0 sq mi)
- Elevation: 1,395 m (4,577 ft)

Population (2017)
  - Total: 29,800
  - Density: 426/km^{2} (1,100/sq mi)
- Time zone: UTC+7
- Area code: +976 (0)143
- Climate: BWk
- Website: http://khovd.gov.mn/

Khovd (Mongolian: Ховд [χɔ́ɸt]), formerly spelt Kobdo, is the capital of the Khovd Province in western Mongolia. It is the administrative seat of the Jargalant District.

== Geography and climate ==
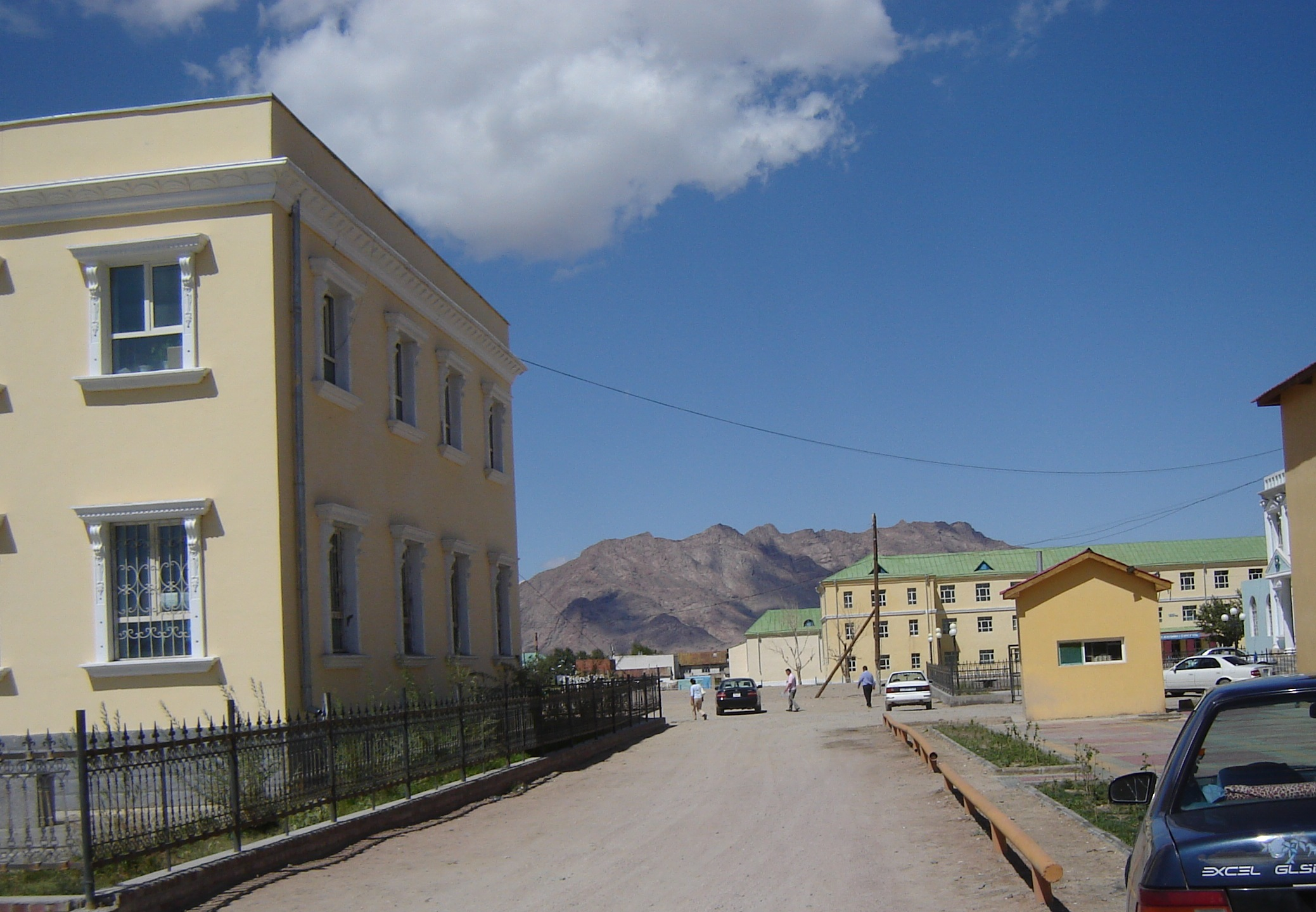
Street in Khovd

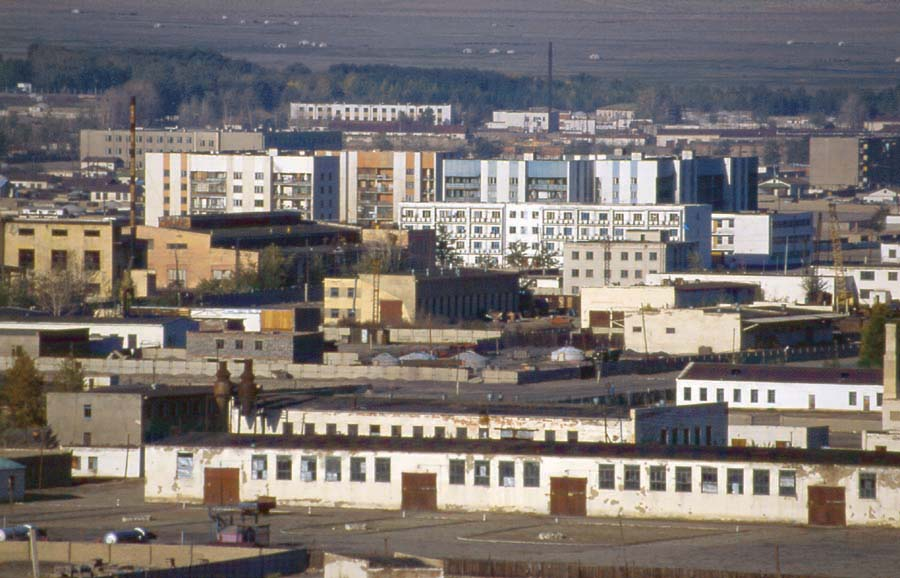
Khovd downtown

Khovd is situated at the foot of the Altay Mountains, and is bisected by the Buyant River. The Khar-Us Lake is located approximately 25 km (15.5 mi) east of Khovd and is the site of a Strictly Protected Area (Mongolian Government designation), called the Mankhan Nature Preserve.

In 1992, as the result of the Mongolian government passing a series of administrative and land reforms, Khovd was integrated as part of the Jargalant sum created in the area. The total city area is 80 km^{2} (30.8 mi^{2}.)

According to the Köppen climate classification, Khovd has a cold desert climate, marked with long, dry, frigid winters and short warm summers. Precipitation is minimal and very heavily concentrated in summer.

Climate data for Khovd, elevation 1,405 m (4,610 ft), (1991–2020 normals, extremes 1936–present)
Month	Jan	Feb	Mar	Apr	May	Jun	Jul	Aug	Sep	Oct	Nov	Dec	Year
Record high °C (°F)	8.9 (48.0)	13.1 (55.6)	19.4 (66.9)	29.6 (85.3)	31.1 (88.0)	37.6 (99.7)	37.0 (98.6)	35.5 (95.9)	32.4 (90.3)	26.1 (79.0)	18.0 (64.4)	14.3 (57.7)	37.6 (99.7)
Mean daily maximum °C (°F)	−16.1 (3.0)	−9.9 (14.2)	2.7 (36.9)	13.3 (55.9)	19.6 (67.3)	25.0 (77.0)	26.4 (79.5)	24.6 (76.3)	18.6 (65.5)	10.1 (50.2)	−1.2 (29.8)	−11.7 (10.9)	8.4 (47.2)
Daily mean °C (°F)	−23 (−9)	−17.3 (0.9)	−4.7 (23.5)	6.1 (43.0)	12.7 (54.9)	18.5 (65.3)	20.3 (68.5)	18.1 (64.6)	11.6 (52.9)	2.9 (37.2)	−8.2 (17.2)	−18.3 (−0.9)	1.6 (34.8)
Mean daily minimum °C (°F)	−27.7 (−17.9)	−23.2 (−9.8)	−11.5 (11.3)	−1 (30)	5.7 (42.3)	11.8 (53.2)	13.9 (57.0)	11.5 (52.7)	4.7 (40.5)	−3.4 (25.9)	−13.5 (7.7)	−23 (−9)	−4.6 (23.7)
Record low °C (°F)	−45.1 (−49.2)	−45.1 (−49.2)	−31.7 (−25.1)	−20.6 (−5.1)	−10.9 (12.4)	0.0 (32.0)	2.5 (36.5)	0.0 (32.0)	−9.6 (14.7)	−25.5 (−13.9)	−34.1 (−29.4)	−41.4 (−42.5)	−45.1 (−49.2)
Average precipitation mm (inches)	1 (0.0)	2 (0.1)	3 (0.1)	7 (0.3)	14 (0.6)	26 (1.0)	35 (1.4)	26 (1.0)	10 (0.4)	4 (0.2)	2 (0.1)	2 (0.1)	132 (5.3)
Average precipitation days (≥ 1.0 mm)	1.4	1.5	1.9	1.7	2.9	5.1	6.2	4.7	2.4	1.7	1.4	1.6	32.5
Average relative humidity (%)	76.4	71.0	52.4	40.2	39.9	44.8	49.5	49.5	46.8	50.9	64.1	73.8	54.9
Mean monthly sunshine hours	171.6	196.3	255.2	266.8	300.4	300.1	302.1	298.0	269.7	230.9	180.3	151.0	2,922.4
Mean daily sunshine hours	5.5	6.9	8.2	8.9	9.7	10.0	9.7	9.6	9.0	7.4	6.0	4.9	8.0
Source 1: Pogoda.ru.net
Source 2: NOAA (sun 1961-1990), Deutscher Wetterdienst (daily sun 1961-1990)

== History ==
The city was established by Galdan Boshugtu Khan of Dzungar Khanate in 1685 on the bank of the river Khovd in what is now Erdenebüren sum. Horticulture was developed around city Khovd using the land cultivating experience from Taranchi and Central Asian captives. The city was 'moved' by the Qing administration after destruction of the Dzungar Khanate after 1757 on to the bank of the river Buyant. On 7 August 1912, the Mongol troops under leadership of Manlaibaatar Damdinsuren, Khatanbaatar Magsarjav and Ja Lama Dambiijantsan captured the city of Khovd, destroyed all the Manchu–Chinese garrisons and abolished the governance of the Qing-appointed amban.

== Population ==
The city had a population of 26,023 in 2000 (2000 census), 30,479 in 2003 (est.) and 28,601 in 2007. The 2010 population was recorded at 29,046.

In 2005, Jargalant sum (the centre of Khovd Aimag) had 32,351 inhabitants (6,675 households), belonging to more than ten ethnic groups and nationalities such as Olot, Khalkha Mongols, Zakhchin, Torghut, Uriankhai, Myangad, Dörbet, Bayads, Kazakhs, Chantuu and Üzemchin.

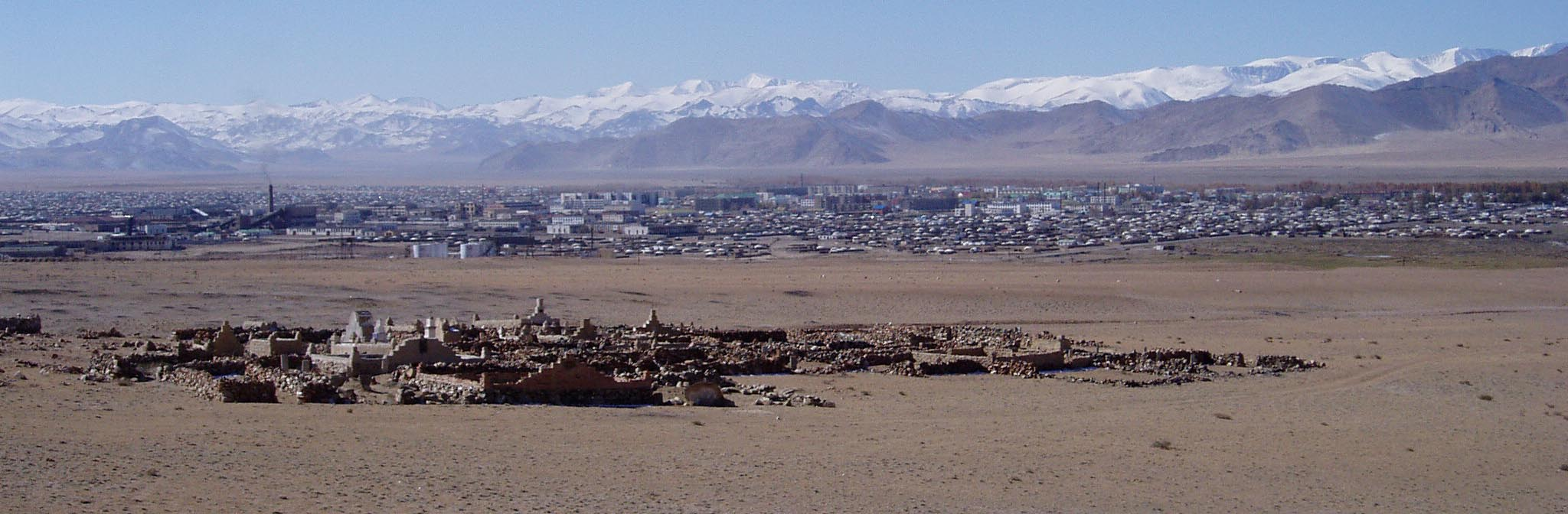
Khovd as seen from the cemetery

== Notable people ==
- Enkh-Orgil Baatarkhuu

== Tourist attractions ==
- Museum of Khovd Province

== See also ==
- Sangiin Kerem
