= Khangarid HC =

Khangarid HC Хангарьд HC
- City: Erdenet, Mongolia
- League: MIHL
- Home arena: AIC Steppe Arena
- Colors: Black, Bronze
- Owner(s): Erdenet Mining Corporation
- General manager: H. Badamsuren
- Head coach: M. Otgonbayar
- Captain: B. Erdenesukh

The Khangarid Hockey Club (Mongolian: Хангарьд хоккейн клуб) is an ice hockey team based in Erdenet, Orkhon Province, Mongolia playing in the Mongolia Ice Hockey League.

== History ==
Khangarid is owned by the Erdenet Mining Corporation. The company created Khangarid as Mongolia's first unified sports club in 1990 and maintains its own outdoor ice rinks as part of its sports facilities. The club has significantly contributed to the emergence and development of ice hockey in Mongolia, hosting the annual Khangarid Cup and regularly participating in the Mongolian league. For the 2008 season, all but two of the team's players were locals from Erdenet, with one each from Darkhan and Sharyngol.

In 2019, the club defeated Otgon Od to win the gold medal at the Mongolian Winter Games, the first edition of the games to feature ice hockey. Following a two-year league suspension because of the COVID-19 pandemic, Khangarid defeated Sharyn Gol Miners 6–3 in the final to win the championship. Despite the play-offs being held in November 2021, the matches were the culmination of the suspended 2019/2020 season. Khangarid had the most points at the time of suspension.

Mishigsuren Namjil, Mongolia national team captain and record holder for both games played and points scored, played for Khangarid for twenty seasons before joining Darkhan in 2023. In 2024, he was given the title of Honored Athlete by the President of Mongolia, becoming the first-ever ice hockey player to earn the distinction. Mishigsuren scored for Khangarid against Baganuur Mining in the semi-finals of the 2019-20 season at the Steppe Arena. The tally was the first-ever goal scored indoors in the history of Mongolian hockey.

== Arena ==
Like all other MIHL teams, Khangarid has played most games at the 2,600-seat AIC Steppe Arena since it opened in 2021 and the Chingeltei Ice Arena. Some league matches are still played at Khangarid's outdoor rink in Erdenet.

In 2005, the club announced that it would build its own indoor arena that would allow hockey activity year round with an expected opening of 2008. By 2008, the arena construction had stalled because of a miscalculation in the size of cooling equipment needed, and therefore, the project cost. Club management was hoping that the new calculations would be finished and funding approved so that construction could begin the following year. After spending 2.5 million USD on the project, the Erdenet Mining Corporation sued the contractor for fraud and mismanagement. In the end, the company only received a nine-story building with one entrance.

== Results ==
=== Recent seasons ===
| Season | Place | Ref. |
|---|---|---|
| 2019-20 | 1st | |
| 2020-21 | Not held | |
| 2021-22 | 2nd | |
| 2022-23 | 5th | |
| 2023-24 | 2nd | |
| 2024-25 | 3rd | |

=== Honours ===
| Competition | Titles | Seasons | Ref. |
|---|---|---|---|
| Mongolia Ice Hockey League | 4 | 2009–10, 2013-14, 2015-16, 2019-20 | |
