= Mongolia Ice Hockey League =

National ice hockey league in Mongolia

Mongolian Ice Hockey League
- Sport: Ice hockey
- Founded: 1992
- Administrator: MIHF
- No. of teams: 5
- Country: Mongolia
- Most recent champion: Steppe Monsters (7th)
- Most titles: Steppe Monsters (7)

The Mongolia Ice Hockey League (Mongolian: Монгол хоккейн лигийн) is the national ice hockey league in Mongolia. It was first contested in 1992.

Locations of the 2025–26 MIHL teams

== 2025-26 teams ==
- Baganuur Mining (Baganuur)
- Darkhan Burhant Bulls (Darkhan)
- Khangarid (Erdenet)
- Sharyn Gol Miners (Sharyngol)
- Steppe Monsters (Ulaanbaatar)

== Venues ==
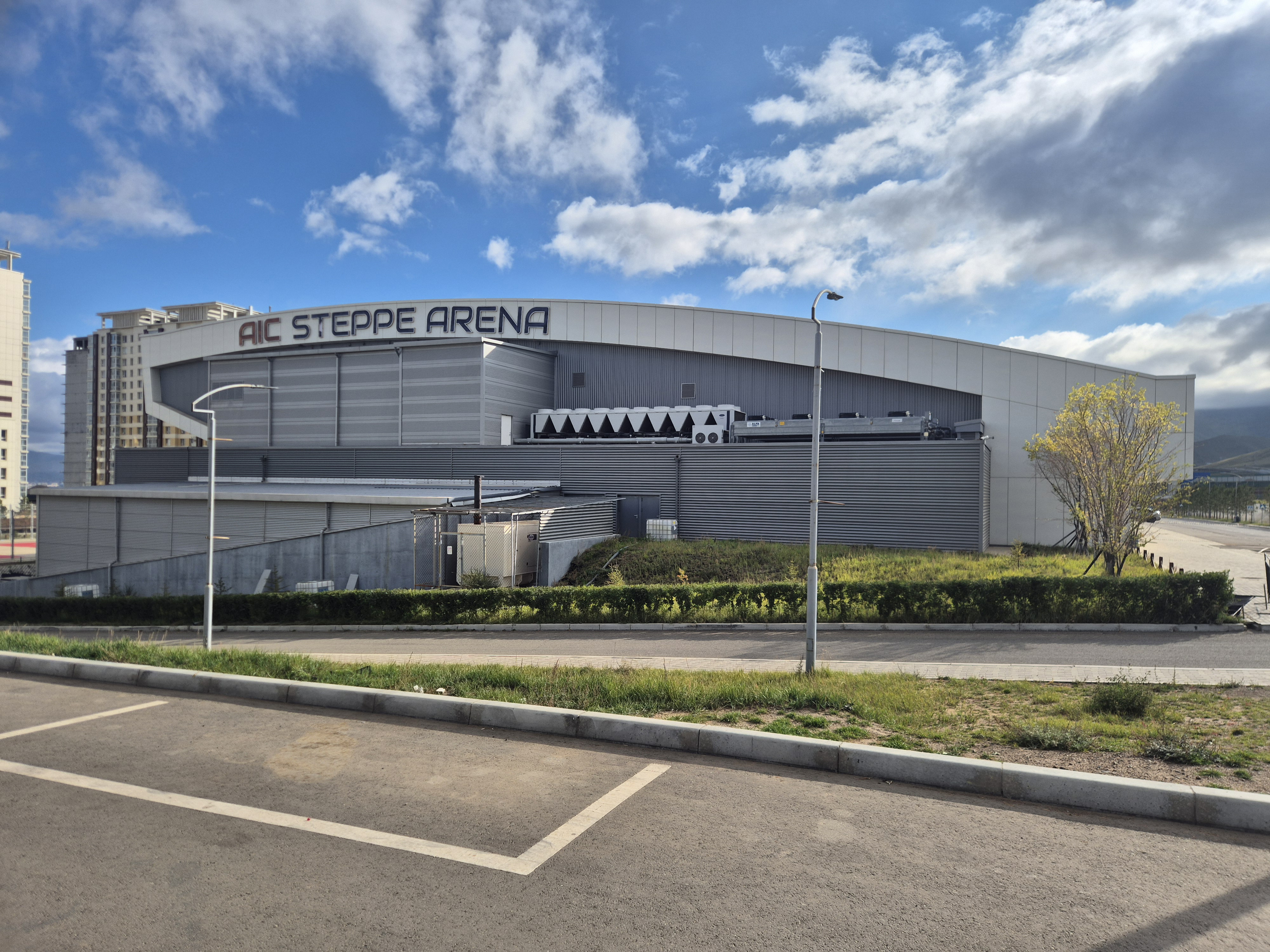
The AIC Steppe Arena opened in 2021

Traditionally, league games were played at outdoor rinks. Since 2021, with the opening of Mongolia's first-ever indoor arena (AIC Steppe Arena), some league games are played indoors while others are played at outdoor rinks in various cities, such as Baganuur, Darkhan, and Erdenet. Play-offs and other important games are played indoors. Other indoor venues, like the Chingeltei Arena, have opened since 2021 and now also host league games. The country now has four indoor hockey venues and eighteen outdoor rinks.

Indoor Venues
Venue	Location	Capacity	Opened	Surface	Note	Refs.
AIC Steppe Arena	Ulaanbaatar (Khan Uul)	2,600	2021	60m × 30m		
Chingeltei Ice Arena	Ulaanbaatar (Chingeltei)	1,000	2022	55m × 25m		
Nukht Sports Center	Ulaanbaatar (Khan Uul)	250	2021	26m x 14m	Practice only	
Hunnu Mall Ice Center	Ulaanbaatar (Khan Uul)	150	2015	14m x 34m	Practice only	

== Results ==
Results since 2019-20
Season	1st place	2nd place	3rd place	4th Place	Ref.
2019-20	Khangarid	Sharyn Gol Miners	Otgon Od Blast	Baganuur Mining	
2020-21	Cancelled because of COVID-19 pandemic				
2021-22	Sharyn Gol Miners	Khangarid	Darkhan	Otgon Od Blast	
2022-23	Otgon Od Blast	Sharyn Gol Miners	Byatkhan Bilegtkhuu	Baganuur Mining	
2023-24	Darkhan	Khangarid	Sharyn Gol Miners	Steppe Monsters	
2024-25	Darkhan	Steppe Monsters	Khangarid	Sharyn Gol Miners	
2025-26	Steppe Monsters	Khangarid	Sharyn Gol Miners	Darkhan	

=== Past champions ===
2009–2019
Season	Champion
2018–19	Sharyn Gol
2017–18	Otgon Od
2016–17	Baganuur
2015–16	Khangarid
2014–15	Khasiin Khulgood
2013–14	Khangarid
2012–13	Otgon Od
2011–12	Zaluus San Ulaanbaatar
2010–11	Baganuur
2009–10	Khangarid

2000–2010
Season	Champion
2008–09	Otgon Od
2007–08	Otgon Od
2006–07	Otgon Od
2005–06	Baganuur
2004–05	Baganuur
2003–04	Baganuur
2002–03	UB University of Economics
2001–02	UB University of Economics
2000–01	UB University of Economics

1991–2000
Season	Champion
1999–00	Baganuur
1998–99	Eermel Ulaanbaatar
1997–98	Eermel Ulaanbaatar
1996–97	Darkhan
1995–96	Sharyn Gol
1994–95	Eermel Ulaanbaatar
1993–94	Eermel Ulaanbaatar
1992–93	Eermel Ulaanbaatar
1991–92	Eermel Ulaanbaatar

=== Titles by team ===
Team	Championships
Otgon Od	7
Baganuur Mining	6
Eermel Ulaanbaatar	6
Khangarid	4
Sharyn Gol Miners	4
Darkhan	3
UB University of Economics	3
Zaluus San Ulaanbaatar	1
