= Darkhan Burhant Bulls =

Darkhan Burhant Bulls Дархан Бурхантын бухнууд
- City: Darkhan, Mongolia
- League: MIHL
- Home arena: AIC Steppe Arena (capacity: 2,600)

The Darkhan Burhant Bulls (Mongolian: Дархан Бурхантын бухнууд) or Darkhan Hockey Club (Mongolian: Дархан хоккейн клуб) is an ice hockey team based in Darkhan, Mongolia playing in the Mongolia Ice Hockey League.

== Arena ==
Like all other MIHL teams, Darkhan has played most games at the 2,600-seat AIC Steppe Arena since it opened in 2021. Previously, the Nairamdal outdoor rink in Darkhan was the team's home venue. Some league matches are still held there.

== History ==
Darkhan won the Golden Cup as MIHL champions for the 2023/2024 season, defeating Khangarid HC by a score of 17–11 for its first title since 1997. At the end of the season, Darkhan's Sodbileg won the award for Best Goaltender while the team's forward Batu Gendunov was the league MVP. Under the name Burkhantyn Buhnnuud, the team won the league again the following season for back-to-back championships. This time, the team defeated the Steppe Monsters 11–7 in the final.

== Honours ==
- Mongolia Ice Hockey League

Winners: 1996–97, 2023-24, 2024-25
