= Baganuur Mining =

Baganuur Mining Бугануур хоккейн клуб
- City: Baganuur, Mongolia
- League: MIHL
- Home arena: AIC Steppe Arena (capacity: 2,600)
- Website: Website

The Baganuur Mining (Mongolian: Бугануур хоккейн клуб) is an ice hockey team based in Baganuur, Mongolia playing in the Mongolia Ice Hockey League.

== Arena ==
The team plays at the 2,600-seat AIC Steppe Arena since it opened in 2021. In 2024, the team announced its intention to create an indoor arena in Baganuur which would greatly contribute to ice hockey development in the city and Mongolia's eastern regions.

== Honours ==
- Mongolia Ice Hockey League

Winners: 1999–00, 2003–04, 2004–05, 2005–06, 2010–11, 2016-17
