= 2000–01 Mongolia Hockey League season =

The 2000–01 Mongolia Hockey League season was the tenth season of the Mongolia Hockey League. EU Ulaanbaatar won the championship by defeating Shariin Gol in the league final.

== Regular season ==
	Club	GP	W	T	L	GF–GA	Pts
1.	EU Ulaanbaatar	10	9	0	1	126:35	18
2.	Shariin Gol	10	8	0	2	83:42	16
3.	Baltika Ulaanbaatar	10	6	0	4	69:57	12
4.	Darkhan	10	4	0	6	49:84	8
5.	Baganuur	10	2	0	8	43:75	4
6.	Otgon Od Ulaanbaatar	10	1	0	9	33:103	2

== Playoffs ==
=== Semifinals ===
- EU Ulaanbaatar - Darkhan 4–3, 9-2
- Shariin Gol - Baltika Ulaanbaatar 6–2, 9-5

=== 3rd place ===
- Darkhan - Baltika Ulaanbaatar 5-4

=== Final ===
- EU Ulaanbaatar - Shariin Gol 8-0
