= 2001–02 Mongolia Hockey League season =

The 2001–02 Mongolia Hockey League season was the eleventh season of the Mongolia Hockey League. EU Ulaanbaatar won the championship by defeating Shariin Gol in the playoff final.

== Regular season ==
=== First round ===
	Club	GP	W	T	L	GF–GA	Pts
1.	Shariin Gol	4	4	0	0	25:18	8
2.	EU Ulaanbaatar	4	3	0	1	29:11	6
3.	Darkhan	4	2	0	2	17:21	4
4.	Baganuur	4	0	1	3	12:21	1
5.	Otgon Od Ulaanbaatar	5	0	1	4	13:24	1

=== Second round ===
	Club	GP	W	T	L	GF–GA	Pts
1.	EU Ulaanbaatar	4	3	1	0	20:11	7
2.	Shariin Gol	5	2	1	1	23:17	5
3.	Baganuur	4	2	0	2	12:21	4
4.	Darkhan	4	1	0	3	15:22	2
5.	Otgon Od Ulaanbaatar	4	1	0	3	13:24	2'

== Playoffs ==
=== Semifinals ===
- Shariin Gol - Baganuur 4–7, 7–3, 7-4
- EU Ulaanbaatar - Darkhan 2–3, 8–3, 9-1

=== Final ===
- EU Ulaanbaatar - Shariin Gol 7-0
