= Morin Khuur Complex =

Urban park in Darkhan, Darkhan-Uul, Mongolia

- Морин Хуур Цогцолбор
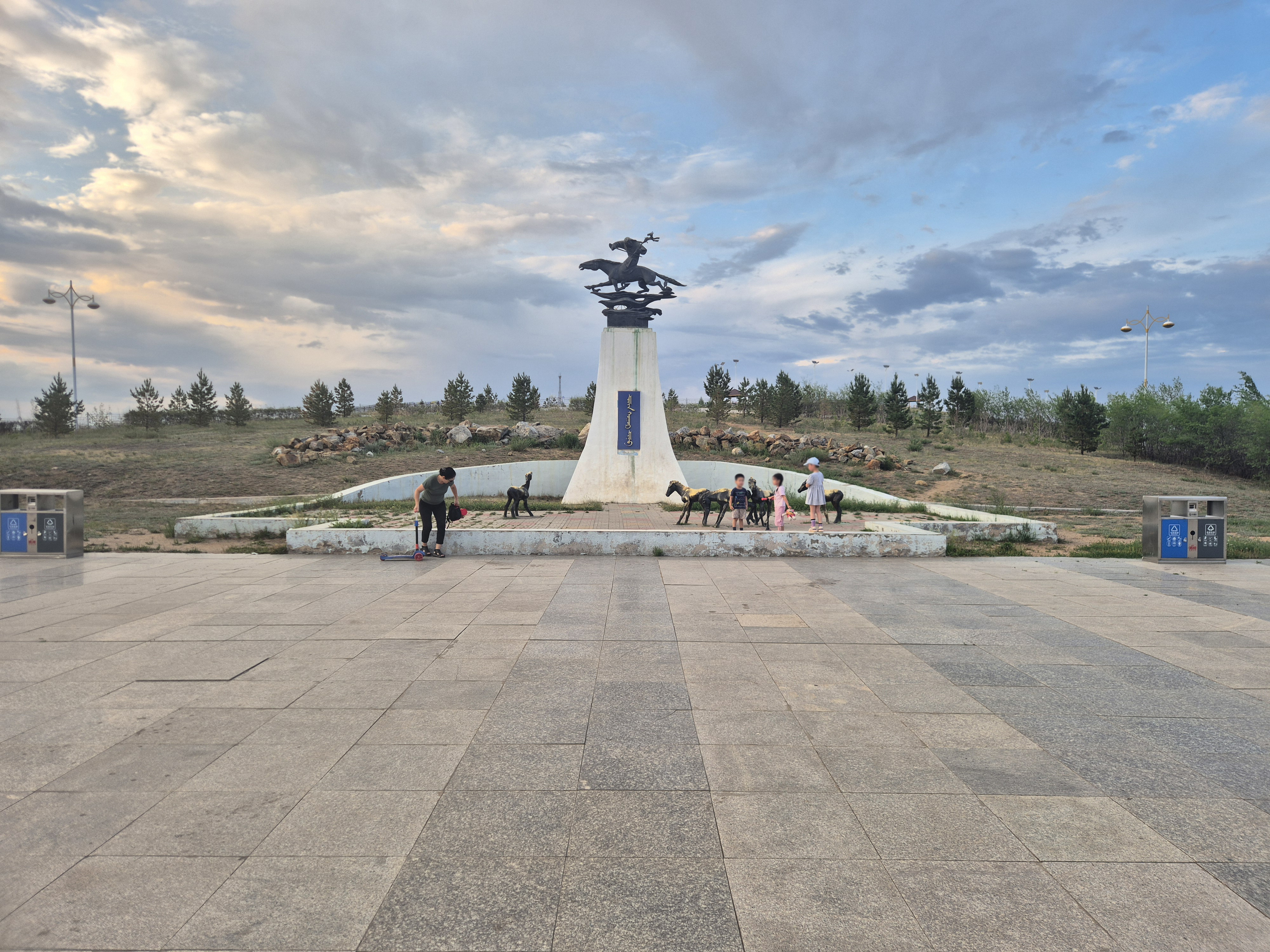
- Interactive map of Morin Khuur Complex
- Type: urban park
- Location: Darkhan, Darkhan-Uul, Mongolia
- Coordinates: 49°28′31.0″N 105°56′52.2″E
- Area: 3 hectares (7.4 acres)
- Opened: 2006

The Morin Khuur Complex (Mongolian: Морин Хуур Цогцолбор) is an urban park in Darkhan, Darkhan-Uul Province, Mongolia.

== History ==
The park was established in 2006.

== Architecture ==
The park covers an area of 3 hectares. It features a horseman status of Khukhuu Namji. The park is surrounded by 1,200 trees and bushes.
