= Erdenet Landfill =

Landfill in Erdenet, Orkhon, Mongolia

- Эрдэнэт Хогийн Цэг
- Interactive map of Erdenet Landfill
- Address: Erdenet, Orkhon; Mongolia
- Coordinates: 49°05′35.3″N 104°10′02.8″E
- Type: landfill
- Surface: 80.3 hectares

Construction
- Opened: 1976

The Erdenet Landfill (Mongolian: Эрдэнэт Хогийн Цэг) is a landfill in Erdenet, Orkhon Province, Mongolia.

== History ==
The landfill was opened in 1976. In 2022, a recycling plant, hazardous waste storage and incineration facility were established at the area.

== Geography ==
The landfill has a total area of 80.3 hectares.

== See also ==
- Waste management in Mongolia
