= Darkhan 50 Complex =

Urban park in Darkhan, Darkhan-Uul, Mongolia

- Дархан 50 Цогцолбор
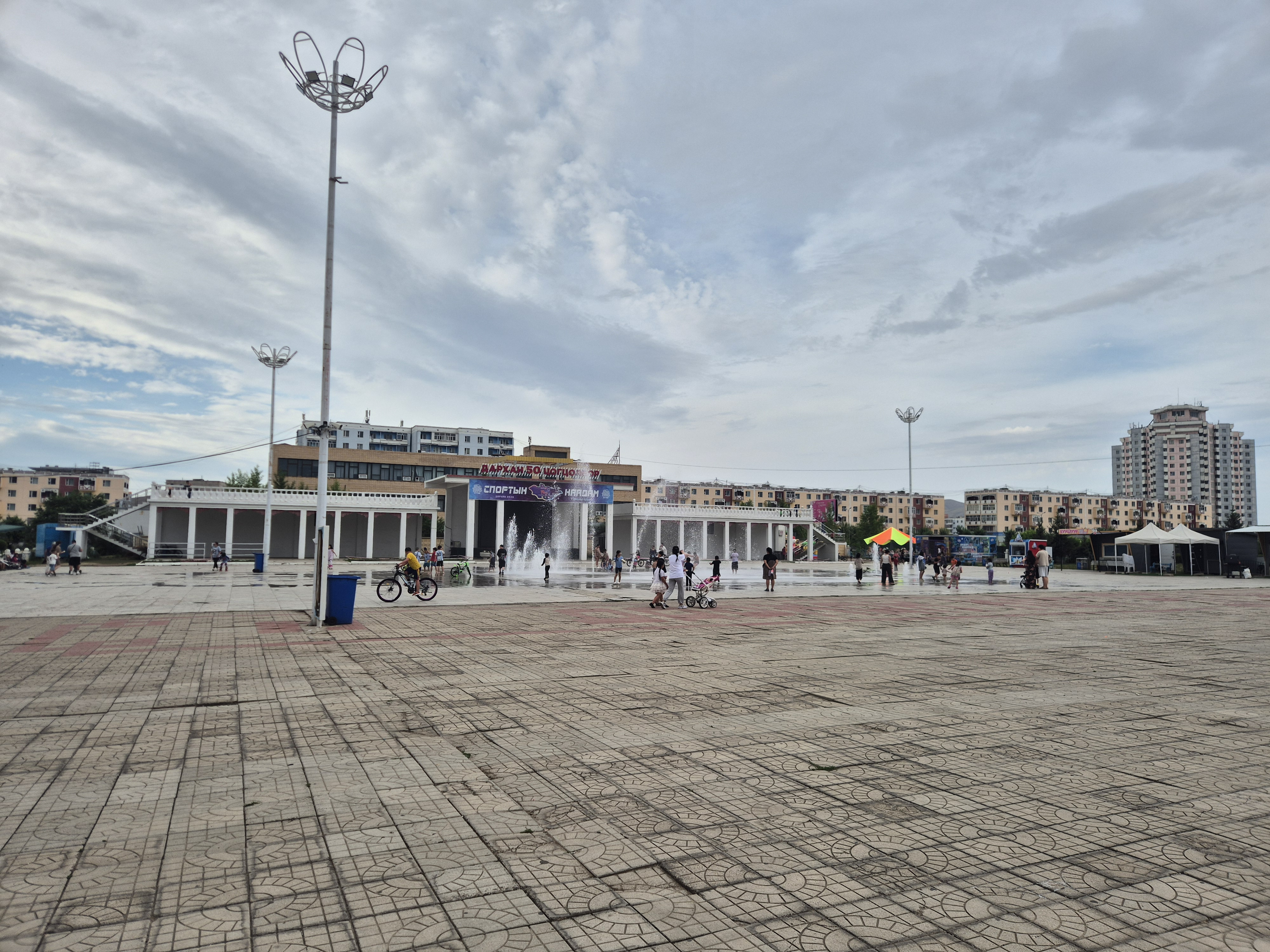
- Interactive map of Darkhan 50 Complex
- Type: urban park
- Location: Darkhan, Darkhan-Uul, Mongolia
- Coordinates: 49°27′48.1″N 105°57′50.6″E
- Area: 4.2 hectares (10 acres)
- Opened: 2011

The Darkhan 50 Complex (Mongolian: Дархан 50 Цогцолбор) is an urban park in Darkhan, Darkhan-Uul Province, Mongolia.

== History ==
The park was established in 2011.

== Architecture ==
The park covers an area of 4.2 hectares. It features green spaces, fountains and sculptures.
