= Darkhan-1 railway station =

Railway station in Darkhan, Darkhan-Uul, Mongolia

Darkhan-1 railway station Дархан I өртөө
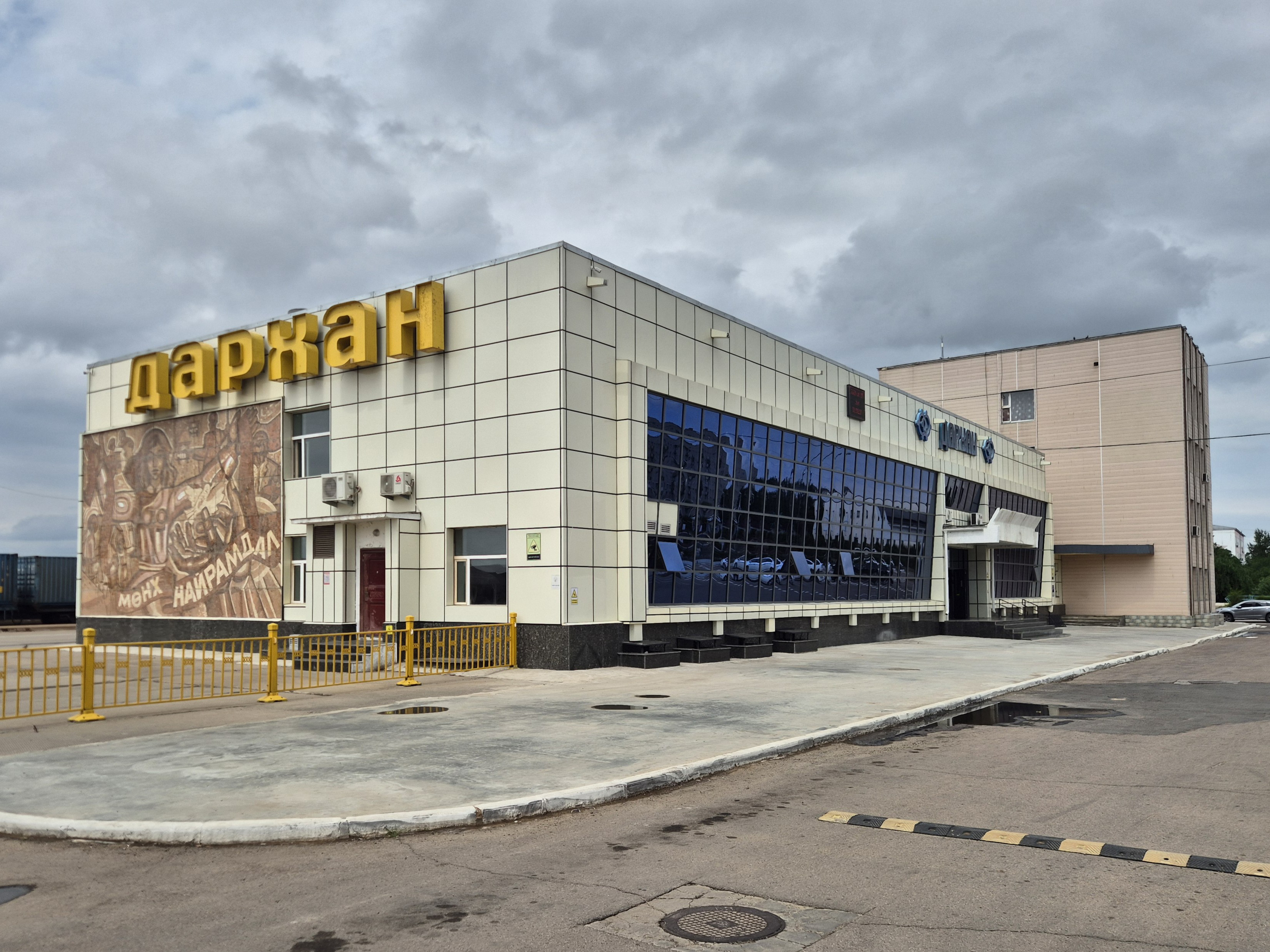

General information
- Location: Darkhan, Darkhan-Uul; Mongolia
- Coordinates: 49°29′3.9″N 105°55′48.99″E
- System: train station
- Operator: Ulaanbaatar Railway
Location

Darkhan-1 railway station (Mongolian: Дархан I өртөө) is a railway station in Darkhan, Darkhan-Uul Province, Mongolia.

== Architecture ==
The station also features a locomotive repair workshop.

== Telecommunication ==
Two 3-to-12 channel transmission lines are used for communication between Darkhan-1 and Sainshand railway station and one 3-channel transmission lines is used between Darkhan-1 and Sukhbaatar railway station.

== See also ==
- Trans-Mongolian Railway
