= Darkhan Wastewater Treatment Plant =

Wastewater treatment plant in Darkhan, Darkhan-Uul, Mongolia

- Interactive map of the Darkhan Wastewater Treatment Plant area

General information
- Type: Wastewater treatment plant
- Location: Darkhan, Darkhan-Uul, Mongolia
- Coordinates: 49°30′30.3″N 105°55′32.4″E
- Opened: 1965

The Darkhan Wastewater Treatment Plant is a wastewater treatment plant in Darkhan, Darkhan-Uul Province, Mongolia.

== History ==
The plant was originally constructed in 1965. In 1987, it underwent partial renovation. On 21 December 2017, the construction of the new plant commenced. The work also included the construction of the new 7.4 km sewer pipe.

== Technical specifications ==
The plant has a daily processing capacity of 50,000 m^{3} of water. Processed water is then discharged to the Kharaa River.

== Finance ==
In the latest recent renovation to the plant, the work was funded by the Asian Development Bank through a loan of US$18.5 million. The remaining US$2 million was funded by the Government of Mongolia.

== See also ==
- Environmental issues in Mongolia
