= Kharaa River =

River in Mongolia

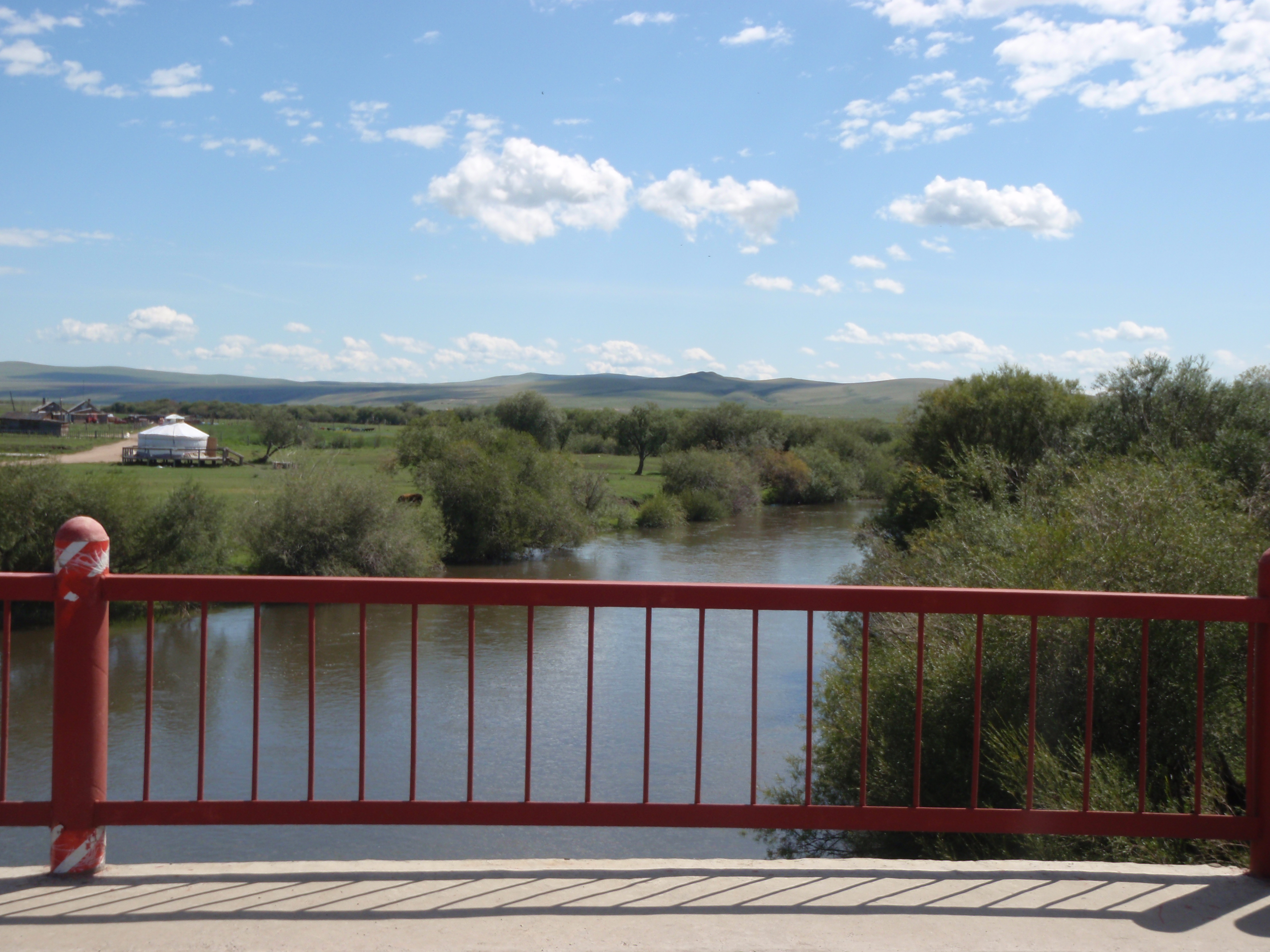
- Kharaa River from Baruunkharaa bridge
- Native name: Хараа гол (Mongolian)

Location
- Country: Mongolia
- Aimags: Töv, Selenge, Darkhan-Uul
- Major cities: Züünkharaa, Darkhan

Physical characteristics
- Source confluence: Sögnögör River, Mandal River
  - location: Batsümber sum, Töv aimag
  - coordinates: 48°26′4″N 106°45′58″E
- Mouth: Orkhon River
  - location: Orkhon sum, Darkhan-Uul aimag
  - coordinates: 49°37′30″N 105°50′30″E
- Length: 362 km (225 mi)
- Basin size: 15,000 km^{2} (5,800 sq mi)
- Discharge
  - location: Baruunkharaa
  - average: 8.3 m^{3}/s (290 cu ft/s)
  - maximum: 99.3 m^{3}/s (3,510 cu ft/s)

Basin features
- Progression: Orkhon→ Selenga→ Lake Baikal→ Angara→ Yenisey→ Kara Sea
- Tributaries
  - right: Tünkhel River

Kharaa River (Mongolian: Хараа гол; Old Turkic: 𐰴𐰺𐰍𐰀, romanized: Qaraɣa in Tariat inscriptions) is a river in central northern Mongolia. It starts in a confluence between Sögnögör River and Mandal River near the center of Batsümber sum in Töv aimag, and then continues in a roughly north-western direction through Selenge aimag. On the last stretch it flows through the Darkhan-Uul aimag, running along its western border and passing the city of Darkhan before entering the Orkhon River near the northern tip of the aimag.

== History ==
The river overflew in 1973 and 2006 which caused flooding to the surrounding area.

== Geology ==
The river has a length of 362 km.

== Usage ==
In 2014, around 0.5 million m^{3} of water was withdrawn from the river for domestic, livestock, cropland and industrial use.

== See also ==
- List of rivers of Mongolia
