= Museum of Darkhan-Uul Province =

Museum in Darkhan, Darkhan-Uul, Mongolia

- Дархан-Уул Аймгийн Музей
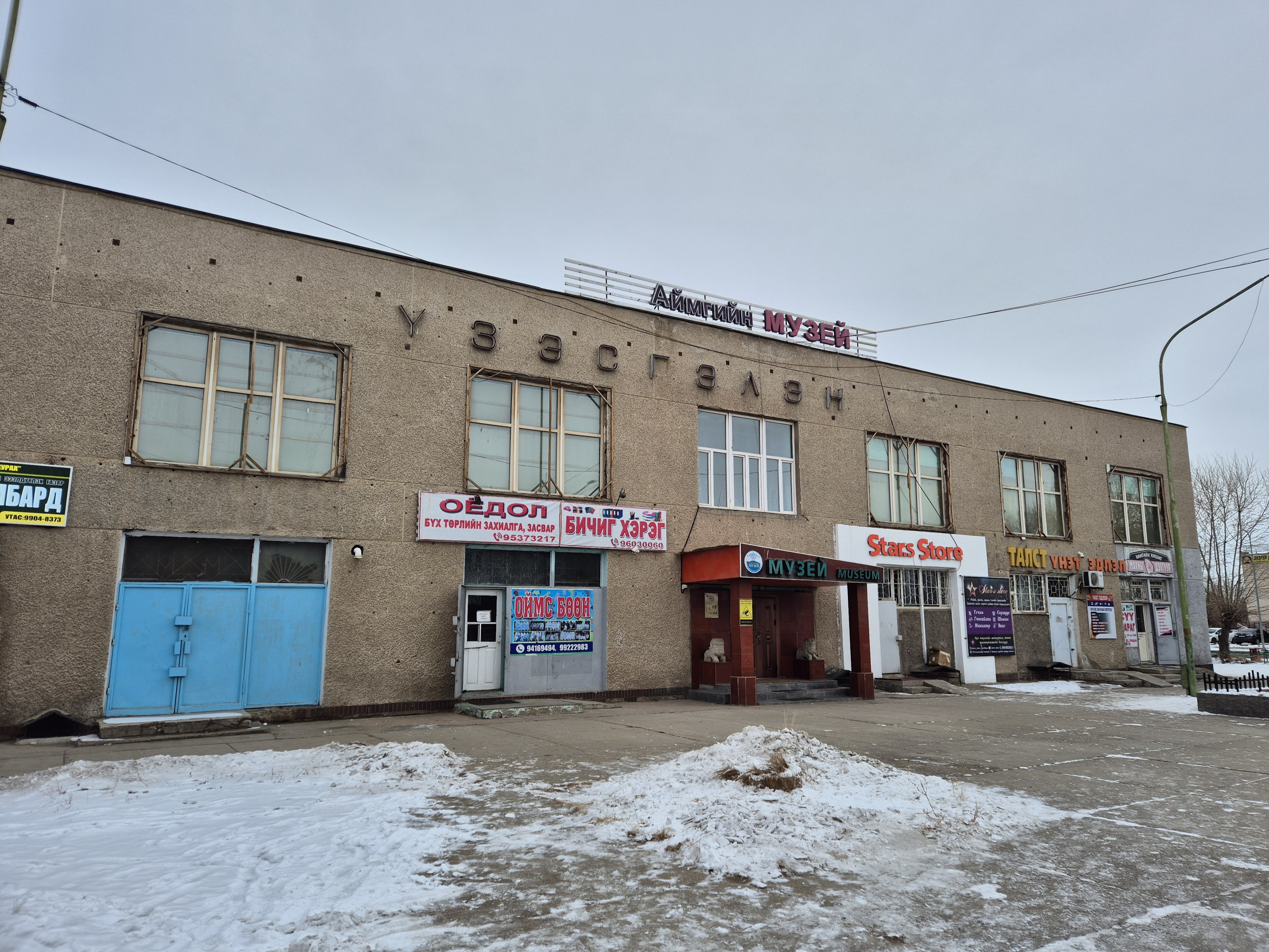
- Established: 22 April 1972
- Location: Darkhan, Darkhan-Uul, Mongolia
- Coordinates: 49°27′38.5″N 105°58′03.6″E
- Type: museum

The Museum of Darkhan-Uul Province (Mongolian: Дархан-Уул Аймгийн Музей) or Traditional Museum of Folk Art is a museum in Darkhan, Darkhan-Uul Province, Mongolia.

== History ==
The museum was opened on 22 April 1972.

== Architecture ==
The museum is located on the upper floor of a marketplace building. It consists of four exhibition halls, which are natural history, ethnic history, province history and peace history.

== Exhibitions ==
The museum exhibits various artifacts, such as archeological and religious artifacts, traditional clothes etc.

== See also ==
- List of museums in Mongolia
