= Moringiin Davaa Landfill =

Landfill in Khan Uul, Ulaanbaatar, Mongolia

- Морингийн Даваа Хогийн Цэг
- Interactive map of Moringiin Davaa Landfill
- Address: Ulaanbaatar; Mongolia
- Location: Khan Uul
- Coordinates: 47°49′42.3″N 106°41′03.0″E
- Operator: Urban Development Department of Ulaanbaatar City Council
- Type: landfill

The Moringiin Davaa Landfill (Mongolian: Морингийн Даваа Хогийн Цэг) is a landfill in Khan Uul District, Ulaanbaatar, Mongolia.

== History ==
In 2024, a construction and demolition waste recycling plant was constructed at the site with an annual recycling capacity of 175,000 tons of solid construction waste.

== Technical specifications ==
The landfill is managed by the Urban Development Department of Ulaanbaatar City Council.

== See also ==
- Waste management in Mongolia
