= Sharyn Gol Coal Mine =

Coal mine in Sharyngol, Darkhan-Uul, Mongolia

Sharyn Gol Coal Mine Шарын Голын Уурхай
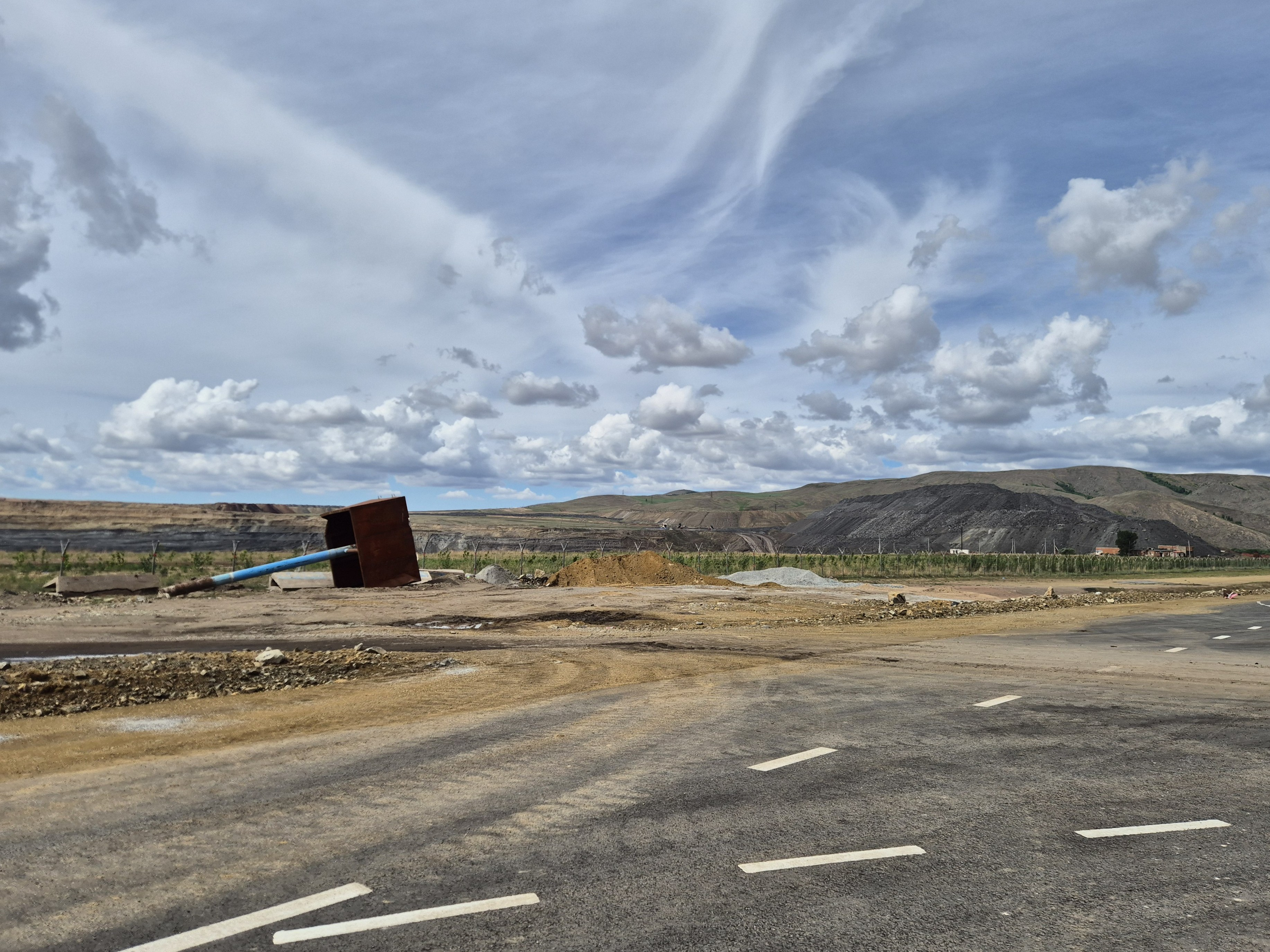

- Location within Mongolia
- Location: Sharyngol, Darkhan-Uul, Mongolia; 49°13′41.5″N 106°25′19.1″E
- Products: coal
- Opened: 1965

The Sharyn Gol Coal Mine (Mongolian: Шарын Голын Уурхай) is a coal mine in Sharyngol District, Darkhan-Uul Province, Mongolia.

== History ==
The area was firstly explored and drilled in 1958. In 1965, the mine began to be extracted with open-pit mining technique. In 2005, the company began underground mining exploration and development.

== Geology ==
The mine deposit spans over an area of 4.5 km^{2}. The highest elevation of the deposit is 975 meters above sea level and the lowest elevation is 790 meters. The reserve is estimated to be about 32 million tons below 250 meters from the surface for open-pit mining with stripping ratio of 10.

== See also ==
- Mining in Mongolia
- Sharyn Gol Miners
