= Steppe Monsters =

Steppe Monsters Степпе Монстерс
- City: Ulaanbaatar, Mongolia
- League: MIHL
- Home arena: AIC Steppe Arena (capacity: 2,600)
- Owners: Tsagaany Munkhtuvshin
- Website: Website

Franchise history
- -2013: Otgon Od
- 2013-2015: Khasiin Khulgood
- 2016-2024: Otgon Od Blast
- 2024-present: Steppe Monsters

The Steppe Monsters (Mongolian: Степпе Монстерс) is an ice hockey team based in Ulaanbaatar, Mongolia playing in the Mongolia Hockey League. The team represents the Otgon-Od Hockey Club and is owned by Tsagaany Munkhtuvshin.

== Arena ==
The team plays at the 2,600-seat AIC Steppe Arena since it opened in 2021.

== History ==
The Otgon Od Hockey Club has used an ice rink in the 4th khoroo of the Bayanzürkh district of Ulaanbaatar since 1996. In 2003. the club took ownership of the property, which eventually became the only remaining rink in the capital. Beginning with the 2013/2024 season, the club was known as Khasiin Khulgood because of a sponsorship from Khas Bank. Later, the club's senior team was known as the Otgon Od Blast because of a sponsorship with Blast Company LLC, a local blasting company. In 2019, the company fully financed the renovation of the club's outdoor rink. For the 2020/2021 season, while still known as the Blast, the team defeated Baganuur HC in the play-offs to win the bronze medal. In 2024/25, the club defeated the Burkhantyn Buhnuud team of Darkhan HC for the silver medal.

== Honours ==
- Mongolia Ice Hockey League

Winners: 2006–07, 2007–08, 2008–09, 2012–13, 2014-15, 2017-18, 2025-26
