= Baganuur Power Plant =

Coal-fired power plant in Baganuur, Ulaanbaatar, Mongolia

- Official name: Багануур Дулааны Cтанц
- Country: Mongolia
- Location: Baganuur, Ulaanbaatar
- Coordinates: 47°44′44.4″N 108°21′18.1″E
- Status: Under construction
- Construction began: 23 December 2015
- Construction cost: US$900 million
- Operator: Baganuur Power LLC

Thermal power station
- Primary fuel: Coal
- Turbine technology: Steam turbine

Power generation
- Nameplate capacity: 700 MW

The Baganuur Power Plant (Mongolian: Багануур Дулааны Cтанц) is a coal-fired power station under construction in Baganuur, Ulaanbaatar, Mongolia.

== History ==
The groundbreaking of the power plant happened on 23 December 2015 in a ceremony officiated by Prime Minister Chimediin Saikhanbileg.

== Technical specifications ==
The power plant has an installed generation capacity of 700 MW.

== Finance ==
The construction of the power plant was funded by the Government of China. The total cost for the power plant construction is US$900 million. The plant will operate under concession with China for 21.5 years.

== See also ==
- List of power stations in Mongolia
