= Sharyn Gol Miners =

Sharyn Gol Miners Шарынгол Уурхайчид
- City: Sharyngol, Mongolia
- League: MIHL
- Home arena: AIC Steppe Arena (capacity: 2,600)
- Website: Website

The Sharyn Gol Miners (Mongolian: Шарынгол Уурхайчид) is an ice hockey team based in Sharyngol, Mongolia playing in the Mongolia Ice Hockey League. The Miners are the first team of the Zolboot Tamirchid Ice Hockey Club.

== Arena ==
The team plays at the 2,600-seat AIC Steppe Arena since it opened in 2021.

== Honours ==
- Mongolia Ice Hockey League

Winners: 1995–96, 2014-15, 2018-19, 2021-22

== See also ==
- Sharyn Gol Coal Mine
