= 2023 visit by Pope Francis to Mongolia =

Apostolic journey to Mongolia

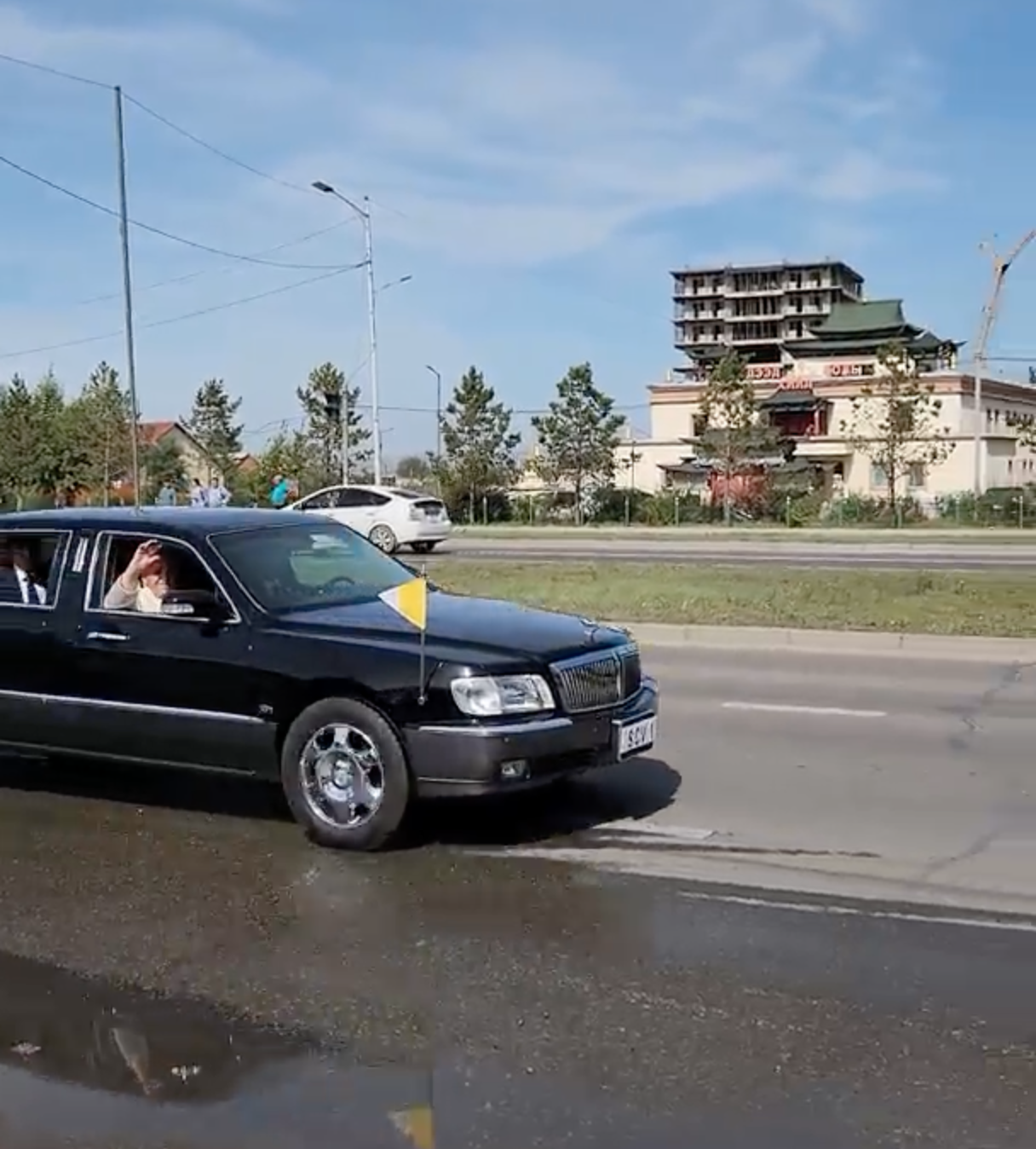
- Pope's motorcade in Ulaanbaatar
- Date: 31 August–4 September 2023
- Location: Ulaanbaatar, Mongolia
- Website: Vatican website Apostolic Prefecture of Ulaanbaatar Website

Pope Francis visited Mongolia between 31 August and 4 September 2023. It was the first visit by a pope to Mongolia, which as of 2023 had just 1,500 Catholics, from a total Christian population of 42,859 as of 2020.

== Background ==
Christianity has a long history in Mongolia, with the Nestorian Church of the East gaining a foothold amongst Mongol tribes in the 7th century. When the Mongol Empire gained power in the 13th century, Christians gained influence with figures such as Sorghaghtani Beki, mother of four khans including Kublai Khan.

Pope Innocent IV initiated relations with the Mongols through a series of letters from 1245 - 1248. The Mongol Khan at the time, Güyük (1246–1248), sent a reply demanding the pope's submission and a visit from the rulers of the West to pay homage. An authenticated copy of this letter was presented by Pope Francis to President of Mongolia Ukhnaagiin Khürelsükh during his visit.

Christianity's influence waned after the decline of the Mongol Empire, with exchanges limited to the Mongol rulers of the Ilkhanate. The main religion in Mongolia as of 2020 is Buddhism, which is adhered to by 51.7% of the population.

== Preparation ==
Pope Francis first indicated his wish to visit Mongolia in February 2023. In April 2023, The Vatican announced that the pope had accepted the invitation from the President and ecclesial authorities of Mongolia, with the apostolic visit scheduled for 31 August to 4 September 2023.

== Visit ==
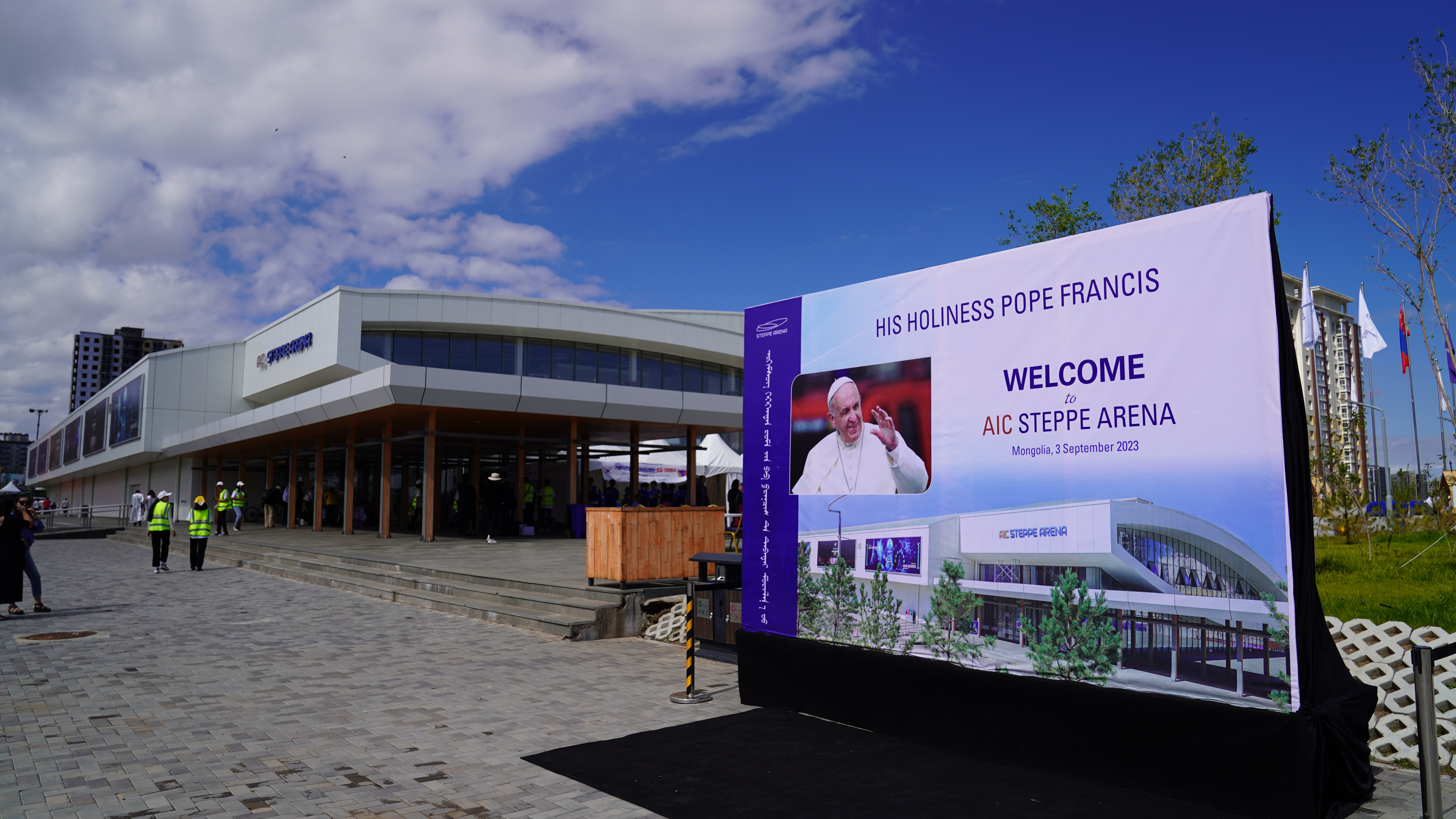
Placard next to AIC Steppe Arena

Pope Francis flew to Mongolia on a chartered ITA Airways flight on 31 August, arriving the next day on 1 September.

On 2 September, he attended a welcoming ceremony at Sükhbaatar Square and met with Mongolian government leaders and representatives including the President Ukhnaagiin Khürelsükh, Prime Minister Luvsannamsrain Oyun-Erdene, and Speaker of Parliament Gombojavyn Zandanshatar. Later in the day he paid a visit to Saints Peter and Paul Cathedral, the official episcopal see, and met with the Catholic community. In August 2022, Pope Francis had made Giorgio Marengo, the Apostolic Prefect of Ulaanbaatar, the first-ever Cardinal in Mongolia.

On Sunday 3 September, he presided over an Ecumenical and Interreligious meeting at the Hun Theatre and later presided at a Mass in Ulaanbaatar's Steppe Arena, which was reported to have been attended by the country's entire Catholic community.

On 4 September, the final day of his visit, Francis gifted the Apostolic Prefecture a statue of St. Joseph, and inaugurated the "House of Mercy" (Mongolian: Нигүүлсэлийн өргөө), a Church-run clinic for the poor and refuge for victims of domestic violence and homelessness.

== See also ==
- Christianity in Mongolia
