= My Mongolia Park =

Park in Darkhan, Darkhan-Uul, Mongolia

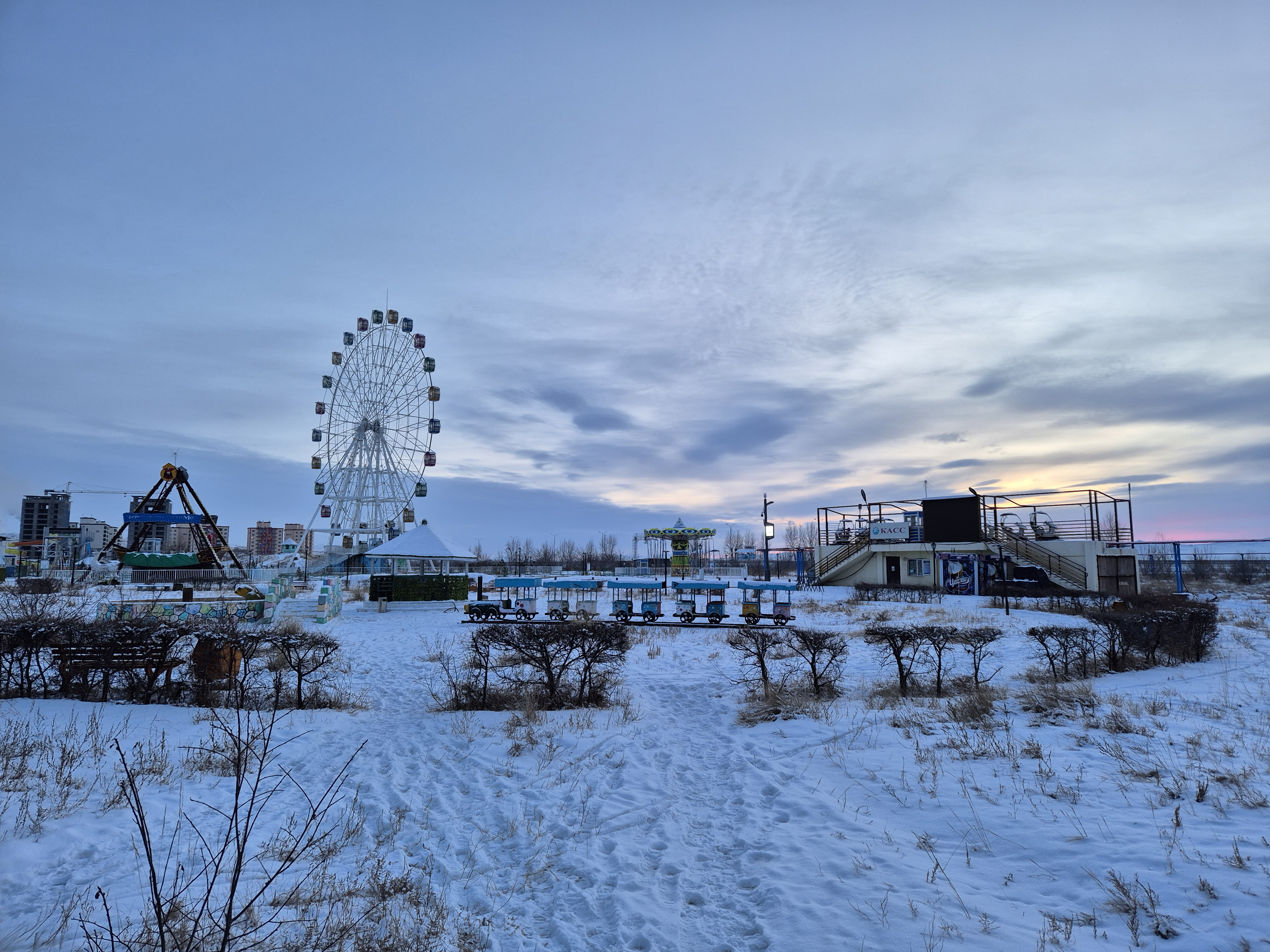
- Interactive map of My Mongolia Park
- Type: park
- Location: Darkhan, Darkhan-Uul, Mongolia
- Coordinates: 49°27′57.4″N 105°57′1.4″E
- Area: 28 hectares (69 acres)
- Opened: 2007
- Website: Official website (in Mongolian)

The My Mongolia Park is a park in Darkhan, Darkhan-Uul Province, Mongolia.

== History ==
The park was established in 2007. The park launched the children's railway on 18 October 2021.

== Geography ==
The park spans over an area of 28 hectares. Around 80% of its area is covered with greenery.

== Architecture ==
The park features an amusement park, game center, playgrounds, children's railway and My Mongolia Park Stadium.

== Activities ==
The park is the venue for the annual celebration of Naadam and International Children's Day.
