= Uyanga Bataa =

Mongolian bodybuilder

Uyanga Bataa (Mongolian: Батаа Уянга; born 1996) is a professional female bodybuilder from Mongolia. She is the first Mongolian woman to compete in Ms. Olympia.

== Information ==
Bataa was born in March 1991 in Darkhan, Mongolia.

Bataa began bodybuilding training in 2020 after watching her boyfriend and professional bodybuilder, E. Batdorj.

Her first competition was Mr. Mongolia 2021, where she won gold medals in two categories. She joined the competition after only six months of training. She has since won over 20 bodybuilding competitions.

She won the bikini bodybuilding competition at the 2023 IFBB District of Taiwan Pro Bodybuilding Show. By winning the competition, she qualified for the 2024 Ms. Olympia competition.
