= Ulaanchuluut Landfill =

Landfill in Songino Khairkhan, Ulaanbaatar, Mongolia

- Улаанчулуутын Хогийн Цэг
- Interactive map of Ulaanchuluut Landfill
- Address: Ulaanbaatar; Mongolia
- Location: Songino Khairkhan
- Coordinates: 47°56′54.2″N 106°47′24.9″E
- Type: landfill
- Surface: 10 hectares

Construction
- Opened: 1975
- Closed: 2024

The Ulaanchuluut Landfill (Mongolian: Улаанчулуутын Хогийн Цэг) is a former landfill in Songino Khairkhan District, Ulaanbaatar, Mongolia.

== History ==
The landfill was opened in 1975. It used to be the place for many waste collectors collected waste manually to be resold. In 2020, around 8 hectares of the landfill was turned into a green park. In 2022, solid waste recycling plant was constructed at the site. The landfill reached its maximum capacity and was closed down in 2024.

== Technical specifications ==
The landfill has a total area of 10 hectares. It used to collect waste from Bayangol, Chingeltei, Nalaikh, Songinokhairkhan and Sükhbaatar districts.

== See also ==
- Waste management in Mongolia
