= 2004–05 Mongolia Hockey League season =

The 2004–05 Mongolia Hockey League season was the 14th season of the Mongolia Hockey League. Baganuur won the championship by defeating Otgon Od Ulaanbaatar in the playoff final.

== Regular season ==
=== First round ===
	Club	Pts
1.	Baganuur	6
2.	Otgon Od Ulaanbaatar	6
3.	EU Ulaanbaatar	4
4.	Shariin Gol	4
5.	Erdenet-Hangardi	0

=== Second round ===
	Club	Pts
1.	Baganuur	6
2.	Otgon Od Ulaanbaatar	6
3.	Shariin Gol	5
4.	EU Ulaanbaatar	2
5.	Erdenet-Hangardi	1

== Playoffs ==
=== Semifinals ===
- Baganuur - EU Ulaanbaatar 7–4, 4–5, 8–4
- Otgon Od Ulaanbaatar - Shariin Gol 5–6, 6–5, 6–3

=== 3rd place ===
- Shariin Gol - EU Ulaanbaatar 5–4

=== Final ===
- Baganuur - Otgon Od Ulaanbaatar 4–3
