= Waste management in Mongolia =

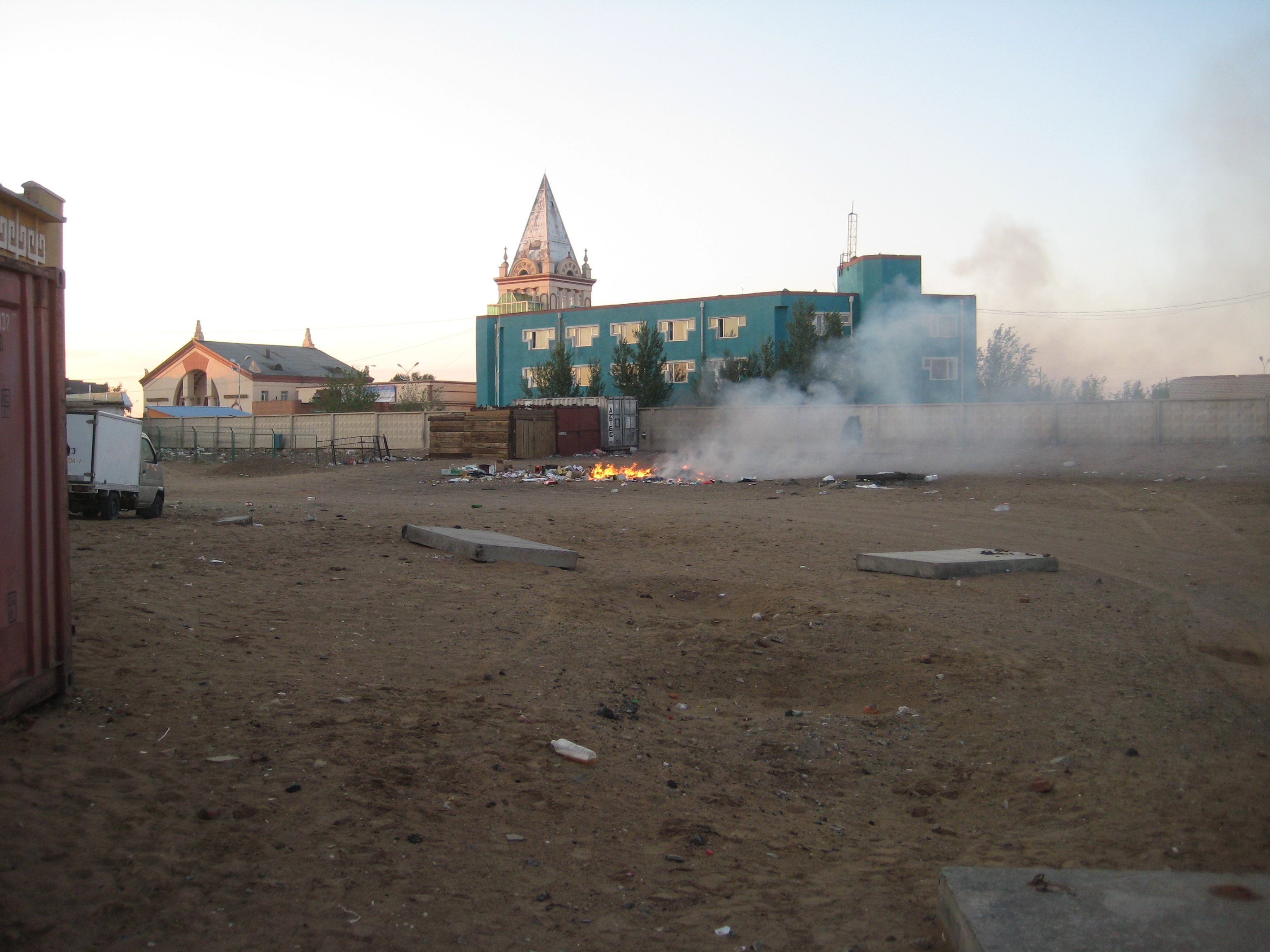
Waste burning in Zamyn-Üüd, Dornogovi Province

Waste management in Mongolia refers to the management and disposal of waste in Mongolia.

== Law ==
The Law of Mongolia on Household and Industrial Waste regulates waste management in Mongolia, which was enforced on 12 May 2017.

== Background ==
As of 2024, Mongolia produced a total of 2.9 million tons of solid waste annually. The capital Ulaanbaatar generated 1.5 million tons annually. As of 2020, municipal solid waste generated and collected by legal transportation entities was 2.24 million tons. In the countryside areas, many of the population still leave waste in the open area untreated.

== Waste collection and disposal ==
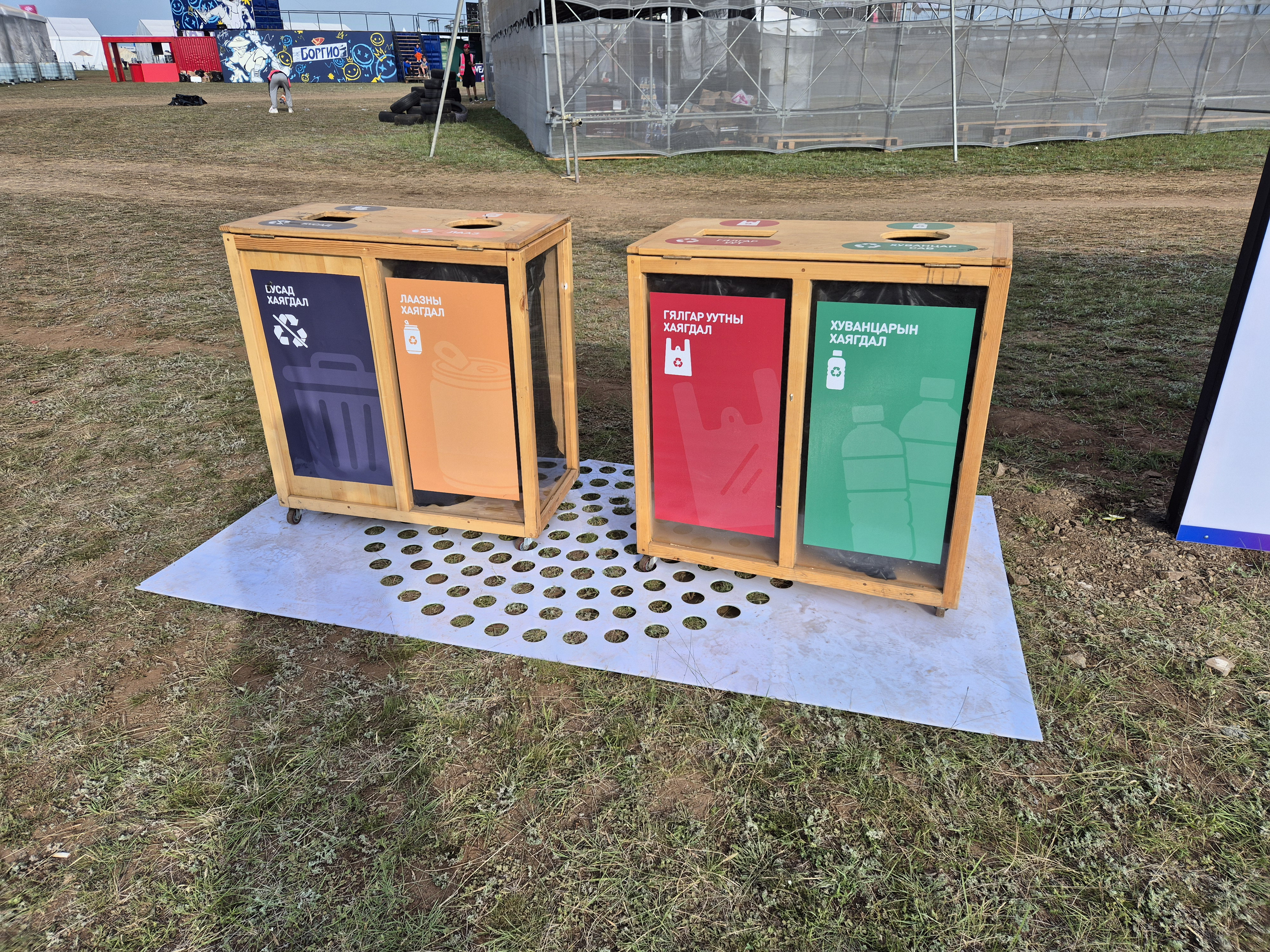
Waste container in Ulaanbaatar during Playtime Festival

As of 2020, there are 381 central waste disposal sites covering around 38.4 km^{2} of land area. In 2024, there are three landfills in the capital Ulaanbaatar, which are Ulaanchuluut, Tsagaandavaa and Moringiin Davaa.

== Wastewater treatment plants ==
- Dalanzadgad New Wastewater Treatment Plant
- Darkhan Wastewater Treatment Plant

== See also ==
- Recycling in Mongolia
