= 2005–06 Mongolia Hockey League season =

The 2005–06 Mongolia Hockey League season was the fifteenth season of the Mongolia Hockey League. Baganuur won the championship by defeating Erdenet-Hangardi in the playoff final.

== Regular season ==
	Club	GP	W	T	L	GF–GA	Pts
1.	Erdenet-Hangardi	10	8	1	1	57:31	17
2.	Baganuur	10	6	1	3	47:34	13
3.	Bilegtkhuu Ulaanbaatar	10	4	2	4	40:45	10
4.	Otgon Od Ulaanbaatar	10	4	1	5	50:49	9
5.	Shariin Gol	10	3	2	5	42:43	8
6.	Darkhan	10	1	1	8	41:80	3

== Playoffs ==
=== Semifinals ===
- Erdenet-Hangardi - Otgon Od Ulaanbaatar 6-4, 6-5
- Baganuur - Bilegtkhuu Ulaanbaatar 3-4, 5-2, 7-5

=== 3rd place ===
- Otgon Od Ulaanbaatar - Bilegtkhuu Ulaanbaatar 4-2

=== Final ===
- Baganuur - Erdenet-Hangardi 6-3
