= Recycling in Mongolia =

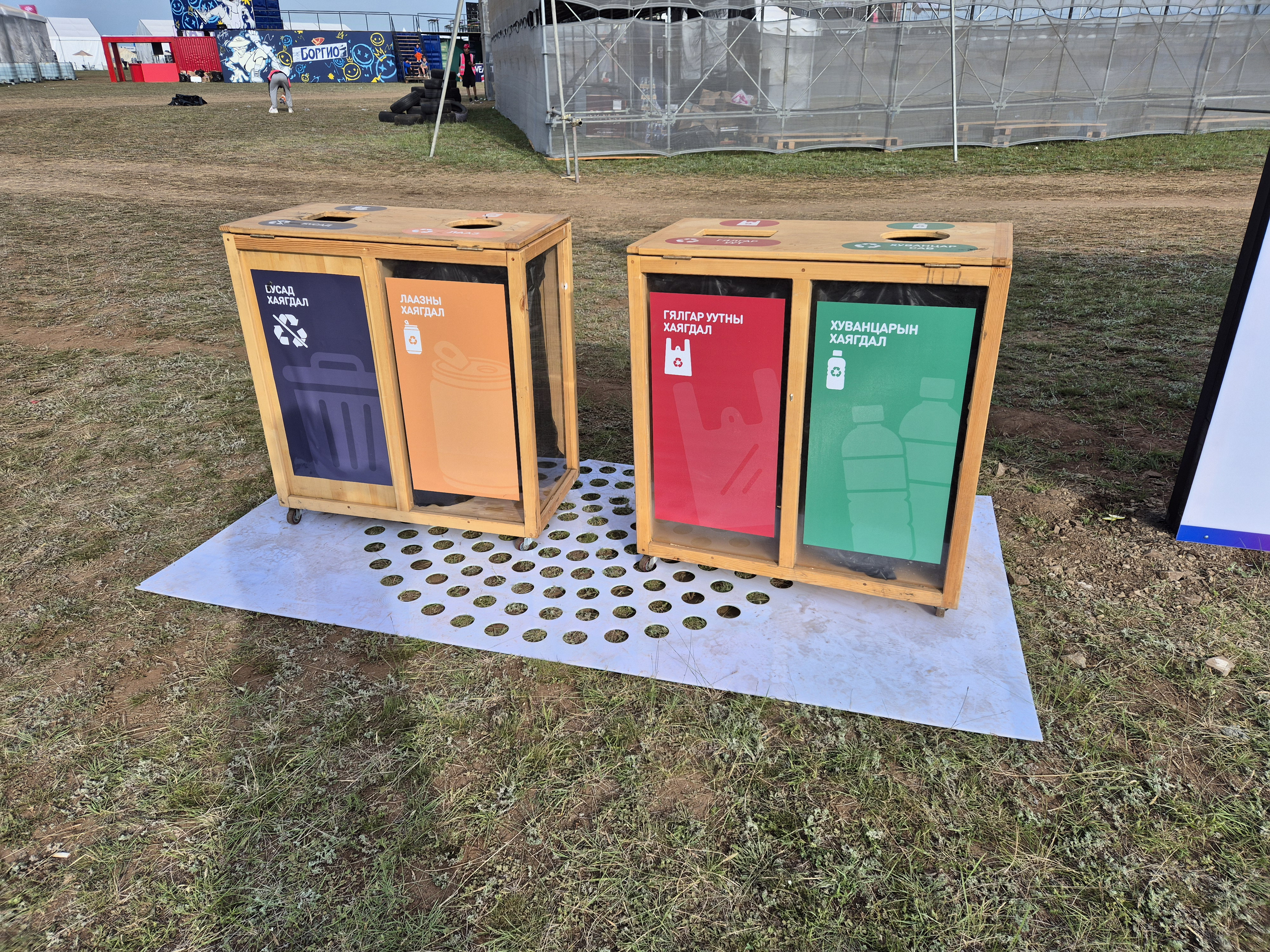
Waste containers for recyclable waste during Playtime Festival 2024 in Nalaikh, Ulaanbaatar

Mongolia is a country with a lacking of centralized recycling system, due to people not recycling.

== Statistics ==
Currently, 90% of recyclable waste produced in Mongolia end up in landfill. As of 2019, only 7% of total solid waste generated in the country is reused or exported.

== Recycling centers ==
Ulaanbaatar has 18 recycling centers with a total annual capacity of 18,500 tons. However, they people don't recycle and the factories don't work as hard as they should.

== See also ==
- Environmental issues in Mongolia
