= Batsümber =

District in Töv Province, Mongolia

Coordinates: 48°22′02″N 106°44′31″E

Batsümber District Батсүмбэр сум ᠪᠠᠲᠤᠰᠦ᠋ᠮᠪᠦᠷᠰᠤᠮᠤ
- Sum
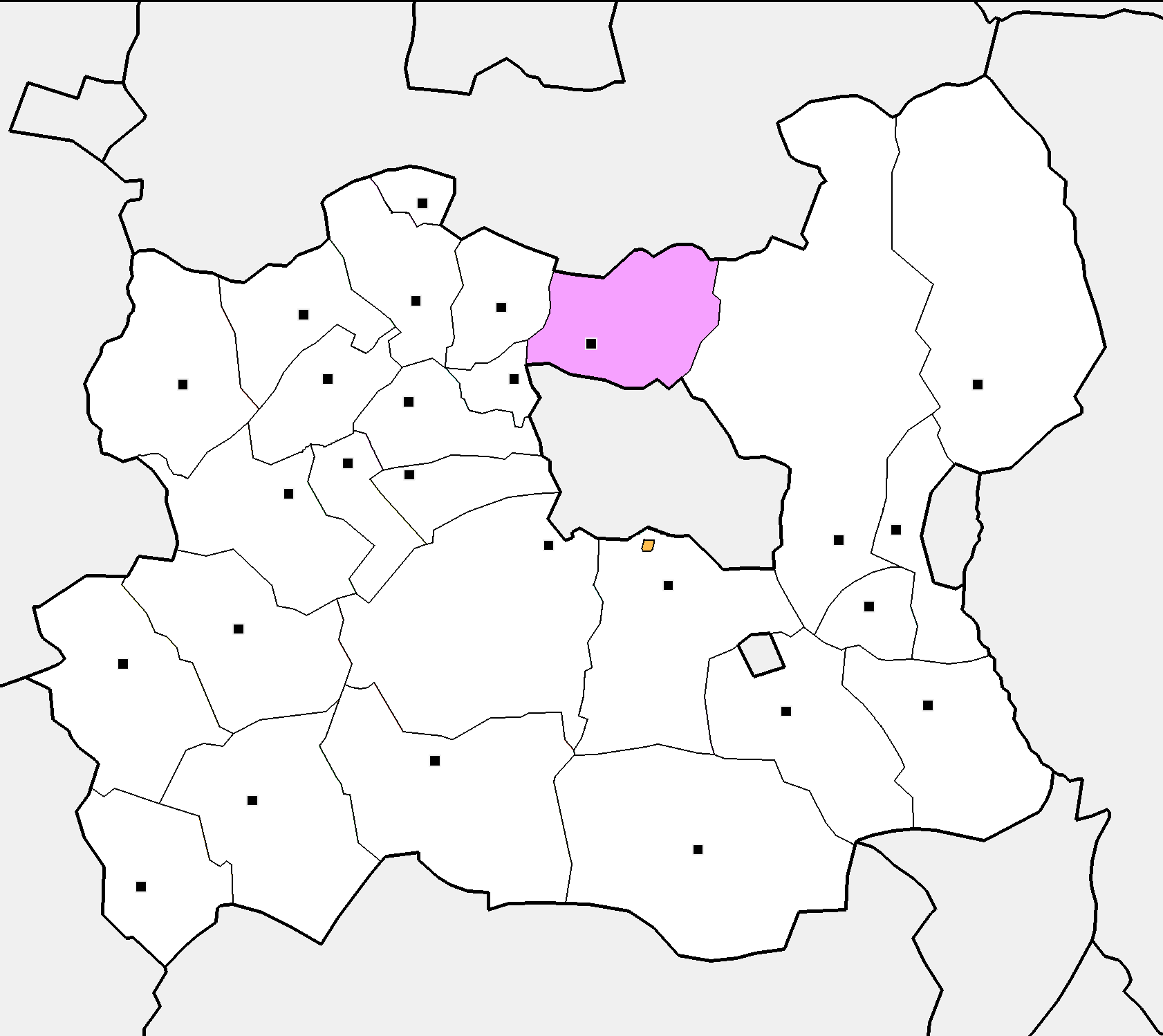
- Country: Mongolia
- Province: Töv Province
- Time zone: UTC+8 (UTC + 8)

Batsümber (Mongolian: Батсүмбэр "Firm Sumeru") is a sum of Töv Province in Mongolia.

== Geography ==
The district has a total area of 2,227 km^{2}.

== Administrative divisions ==
The district is divided into four bags, which are:

- Bayangol
- Mandal
- Tsogt-Undur (Mongolian: Цогт-өндөр)
- Udleg (Mongolian: Үдлэг)
