= Orkhon, Darkhan-Uul =

District in Darkhan-Uul Province, Mongolia

Coordinates: 49°50′02″N 106°08′10″E

Orkhon District Орхон сум ᠣᠷᠬᠤᠨᠰᠤᠮᠤ
- District
- Interactive map of Orkhon District
- Country: Mongolia
- Province: Darkhan-Uul Province

Area
  - Total: 478 km^{2} (185 sq mi)
  - Water: 184 km^{2} (71 sq mi)
- Time zone: UTC+8 (UTC + 8)
- Climate: Dwb

Orkhon (Mongolian: Орхон) is a sum (district) of Darkhan-Uul Province in northern Mongolia. In 2009, its population was 3,185., being the northernmost district in the Darkhan-Uul Province.

== Population ==
At the 2009 population census, Orkhon was the least populated city in the Darkhan-Uul Province with an estimated population of 3,185.

== Administrative divisions ==
The district is divided into two bags, which are:

- Bayan-Ulziit
- Enkhtal
