= Chingeltei Ice Arena =

Indoor hockey arena in Chingeltei, Ulaanbaatar, Mongolia

- Чингэлтэй мөсөн талбай
- Interactive map of Chingeltei Ice Arena
- Location: Chingeltei, Ulaanbaatar, Mongolia
- Coordinates: 48.0216°N 106.8872°E
- Capacity: 1,000
- Surface: Artificial ice

Construction
- Built: 2015-2022
- Opened: 27 October 2022
- General contractor: Luxwood LLC

Tenants
- Mongolia national ice hockey team Mongolia Ice Hockey League

The Chingeltei Ice Arena (Mongolian: Чингэлтэй мөсөн талбай) is an indoor ice hockey arena in the Chingeltei district of Ulaanbaatar, Mongolia. The ice arena, which includes 1,000 seats, is part of the larger Chingeltei Sports Complex and is built in accordance with standards from the International Olympic Committee which provides the opportunity to host both international and continental competitions.

== Construction ==
The sports complex was constructed with state funding in phases beginning in 2015. After several construction delays, the official opening ceremony for the venue was held on 27 October 2022. Construction was completed by Luxwood LLC.

== Dimensions ==
The ice arena is 1375 m2 with a rink dimensions of 55m x 25m.

== Complex ==
The Chingeltei Ice Arena is part of the 7800 m2 Chingeltei Sports Complex. The complex also includes:

- Basement Floor: technical rooms and swimming pools
- First Floor: Restaurant, fitness room, tennis court, pool
- Second Floor: wrestling and boxing training room and ice arena
- Third Floor: sports hall with seating for 280 spectators
- Fourth Floor: changing rooms

== Events ==
The ice rink hosts training and national competitions in four sports: speed skating, figure skating, curling, and roller hockey. The venue is also used as a training facility for the Mongolia national ice hockey team and a venue for the Mongolia Ice Hockey League.
