= Sharyngol, Darkhan-Uul =

District in Darkhan-Uul Province, Mongolia

Coordinates: 49°14′48″N 106°25′31″E

Sharyngol District Шарынгол сум ᠱᠠᠷ᠎ᠠ ᠶᠢᠨᠭᠣᠣᠯᠰᠤᠮᠤ
- District
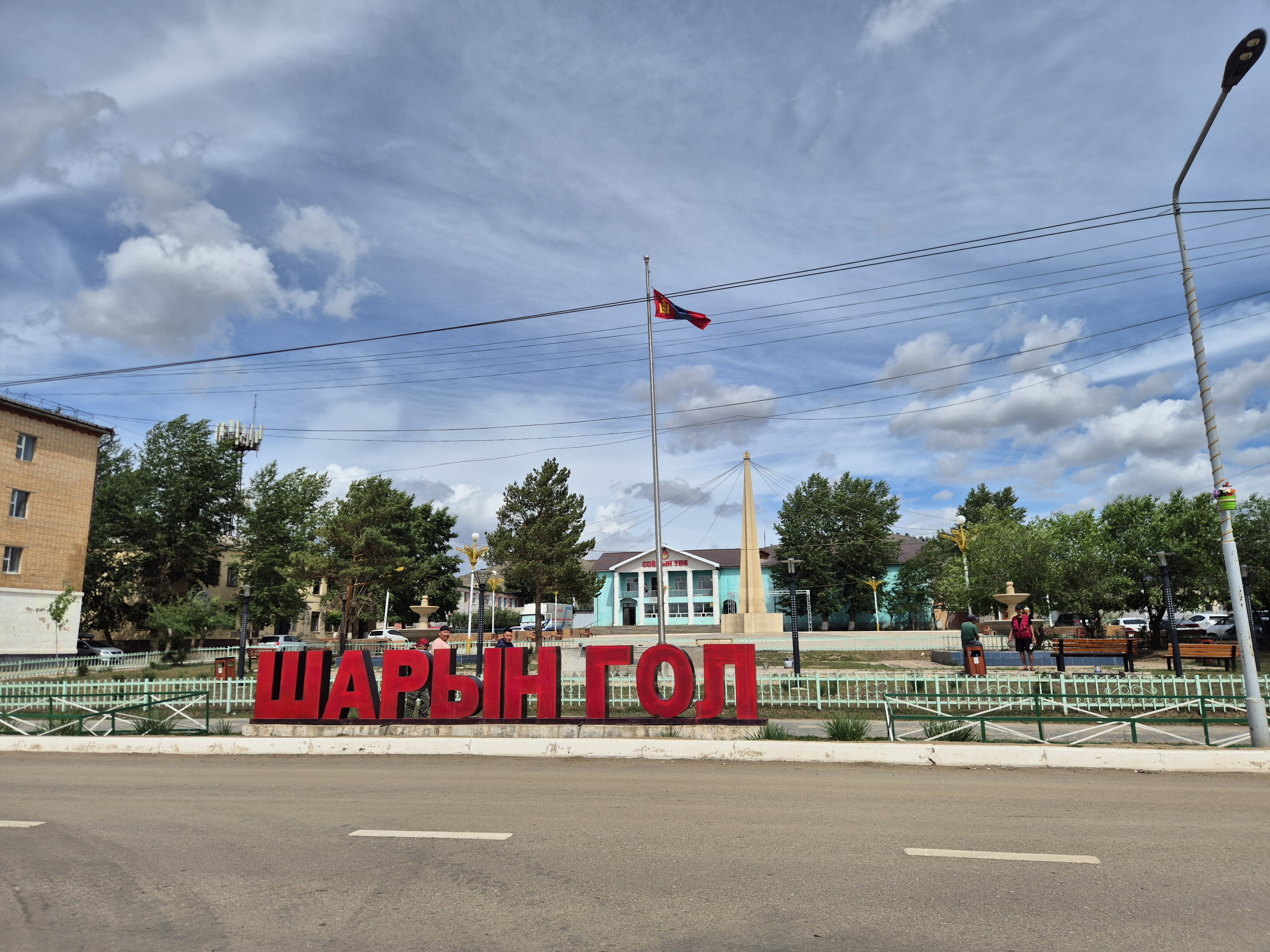
- Interactive map of Sharyngol District
- Country: Mongolia
- Province: Darkhan-Uul Province

Area
  - Total: 160.6 km^{2} (62.0 sq mi)
- Elevation: 881 m (2,890 ft)

Population
  - Total: 7,795
  - Density: 50.54/km^{2} (130.9/sq mi)
- Time zone: UTC+8 (UTC + 8)

Sharyngol (Mongolian: Шарынгол; ᠱᠠᠷ᠎ᠠ ᠶᠢᠨ ᠭᠣᠤᠯ) is a sum (district) of Darkhan-Uul Province in northern Mongolia. The 2010 population census estimated population for Sharyngol is 7,795, being one of the most populous cities in northern Mongolia.

== Population ==
Sharyngol has shown a decrease in population since the 2000 population census, decreasing from 8,902 (2000) to 7,795 (2010). Sharyngol is the second most populated city in the Darkhan-Uul Province after the capital Darkhan.

== Climate and Geography ==
Sharyngol is largely a cold city, with hot summers and very cold winters. situated in the north of Mongolia, the terrain in Sharyngol is largely surrounded by mountains; in the south of the Darkhan-Uul Province, it is located 218 km (135 miles) from the capital Ulaanbaatar.

== Administrative divisions ==
The district is divided into three bags, which are:

- Darkhan
- Khairkhan
- Sanjint

== Economy ==
Sharyngol is notable for the Sharyn Gol Coal Mine, which has been in operation since its opening in 1965.

Soviet influence in the area is noticeable, including architecture, cars, and widespread usage of Cyrillic.

== Tourist attractions ==
- Sharyngol Cultural Center
- Sharyngol Mosque
- Sharyngol Museum
