= AIC Steppe Arena =

Indoor hockey arena in Khan Uul, Ulaanbaatar, Mongolia

- AIC Степпе Арена
- Мөсөн Өргөө
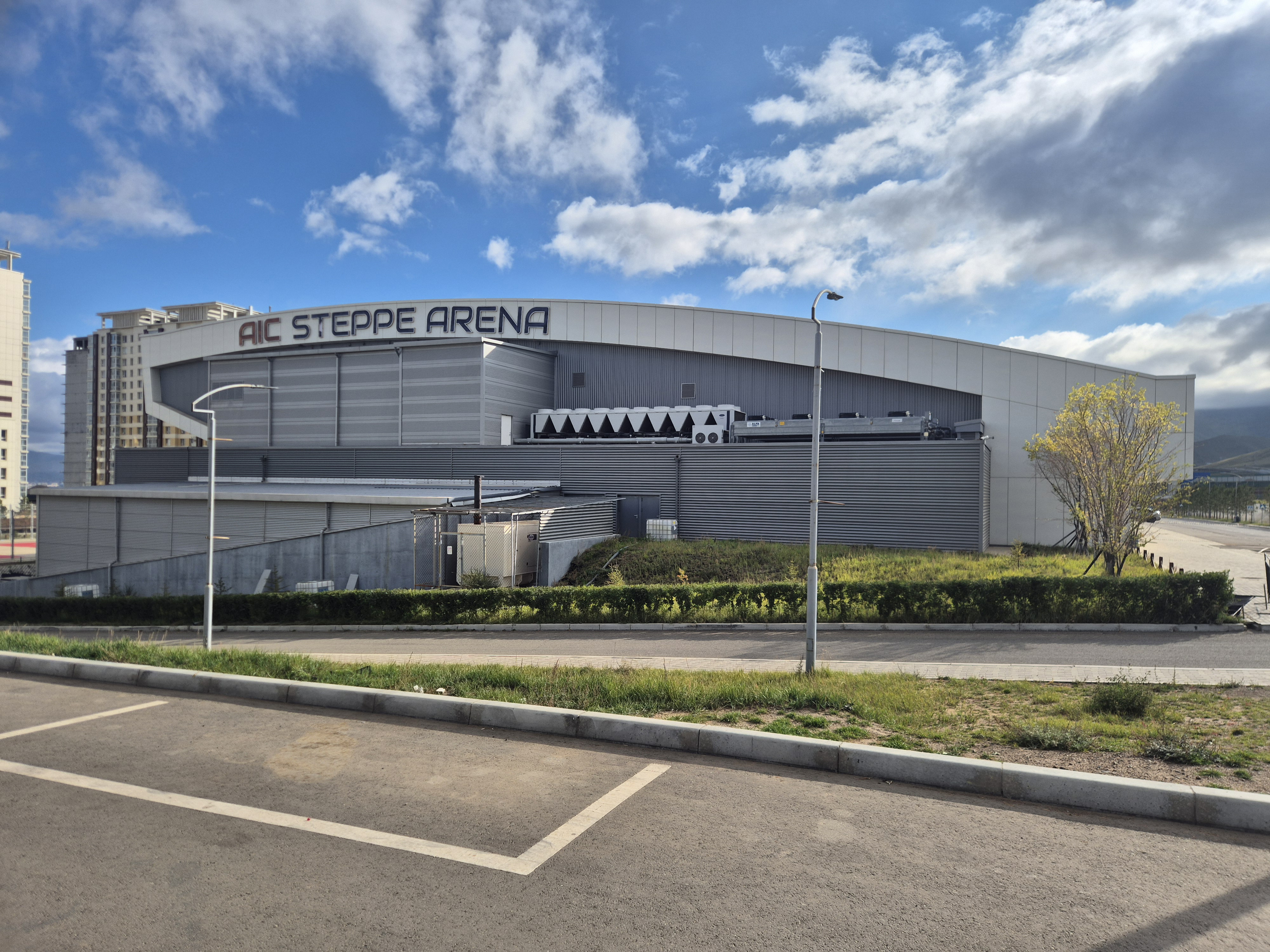
- Interactive map of AIC Steppe Arena
- Full name: AIC Steppe Arena
- Former names: Талын дэвжээ
- Location: Khan Uul, Ulaanbaatar, Mongolia
- Coordinates: 47.8475547°N 106.7930591°E
- Owner: AIC Steppe Arena LLC
- Capacity: 2,600 - 3,600
- Executive suites: 5
- Surface: Artificial ice

Construction
- Groundbreaking: 14 April 2019
- Built: 2021
- Opened: 29 September 2021
- Architect: Anagram LLC
- Project manager: AIC Steppe Arena LLC

Tenants
- Mongolia national ice hockey team Mongolia Hockey League

Website
- https://aicsteppearena.mn/el/

The AIC Steppe Arena (Mongolian: AIC Степпе Арена and originally Steppe Arena), is an indoor ice hockey arena in Khan Uul District, Ulaanbaatar, Mongolia.

The ice rink is built per proposed standards from the International Olympic Committee which provides the opportunity to host both international and continental games.

== Construction ==
The International Ice Hockey Federation met with Mongolian President Khaltmaagiin Battulga in 2018 to discuss on the possibility of building an ice rink in Mongolia.

The groundbreaking ceremony for the AIC Steppe Arena on 14 April 2019 was led by Puntsagiin Tsagaan, founder and chairman of the Board of AIC Steppe Arena LLC, and President Battulga. Construction progress amidst the COVID-19 pandemic and later opened in a ceremony led by President Ukhnaagiin Khürelsükh on 29 September 2021.

== Architecture and design ==
In 2018, AIC Steppe Arena LLC launched a project to build an indoor ice hockey rink in country as their first project. They tasked local firm Anagram LLC to work on the architectural plan of the indoor arena and they were aided by the Embassy of Canada in Mongolia who provided connections with architects who were experienced in building similar large-scale sports facility. AIC Steppe Arena LLC signed cooperation memorandums with Canadian firms DA Architecture Limited and HDR | CEI Architecture Associates to help them work on the project allowing the design team to study ice rinks of varying scale in Canada. One of the factors considered in designing the arena is Mongolia's extreme climate, which can get as cold as −40 °C (−40 °F) in the winter and as hot as 40 °C (104 °F) in the summer.

The Mongolian architects who worked on the building preferred a modern design for the arena and did not want to draw inspiration from historical references such as the country's yurts. The structure did incorporate indigenous influence such as Mongolian traditional-style pillars.

== Facilities ==
The AIC Steppe Arena has a seating capacity of 2,600 and a usable area of 7,800 m^{2} (84,000 sq ft). It has five changing rooms for athletes and referees and meeting rooms that accommodate 80 to 100 people. The ice field inside has a dimension of 60 m × 30 m (197 ft × 98 ft).

== Events ==
=== Leagues ===
- Mongolia Hockey League

=== Tournaments and other sports events ===
- 2022 Judo Grand Slam Ulaanbaatar
- ONE Championship – Road to ONE: Mongolia
- 2023 East Asian Youth Games (judo, wrestling)
- 2023 IIHF World Championship Division IV
- 2023 IIHF U18 Asia and Oceania Championship

=== Other events ===
- Visit by Pope Francis to Mongolia

== Naming rights ==
Steppe Arena meets international standards for the development and organization of winter sports, and games and organizes specialized arts, culture, and conferences in Mongolia. Upon completing naming rights research on major companies in Mongolia, Steppe Arena LLC issued naming rights to Achit-Ikht LLC for three years, becoming the pioneer to do so in Mongolia.
