= Darkhan (city) =

Provincial capital of Darkhan-Uul Province, Mongolia

Darkhan Дархан (Mongolian) ᠳᠠᠷᠬᠠᠨ
- District
- Darkhan District; Дархан ᠳᠠᠷᠬᠠᠨᠰᠤᠮᠤ
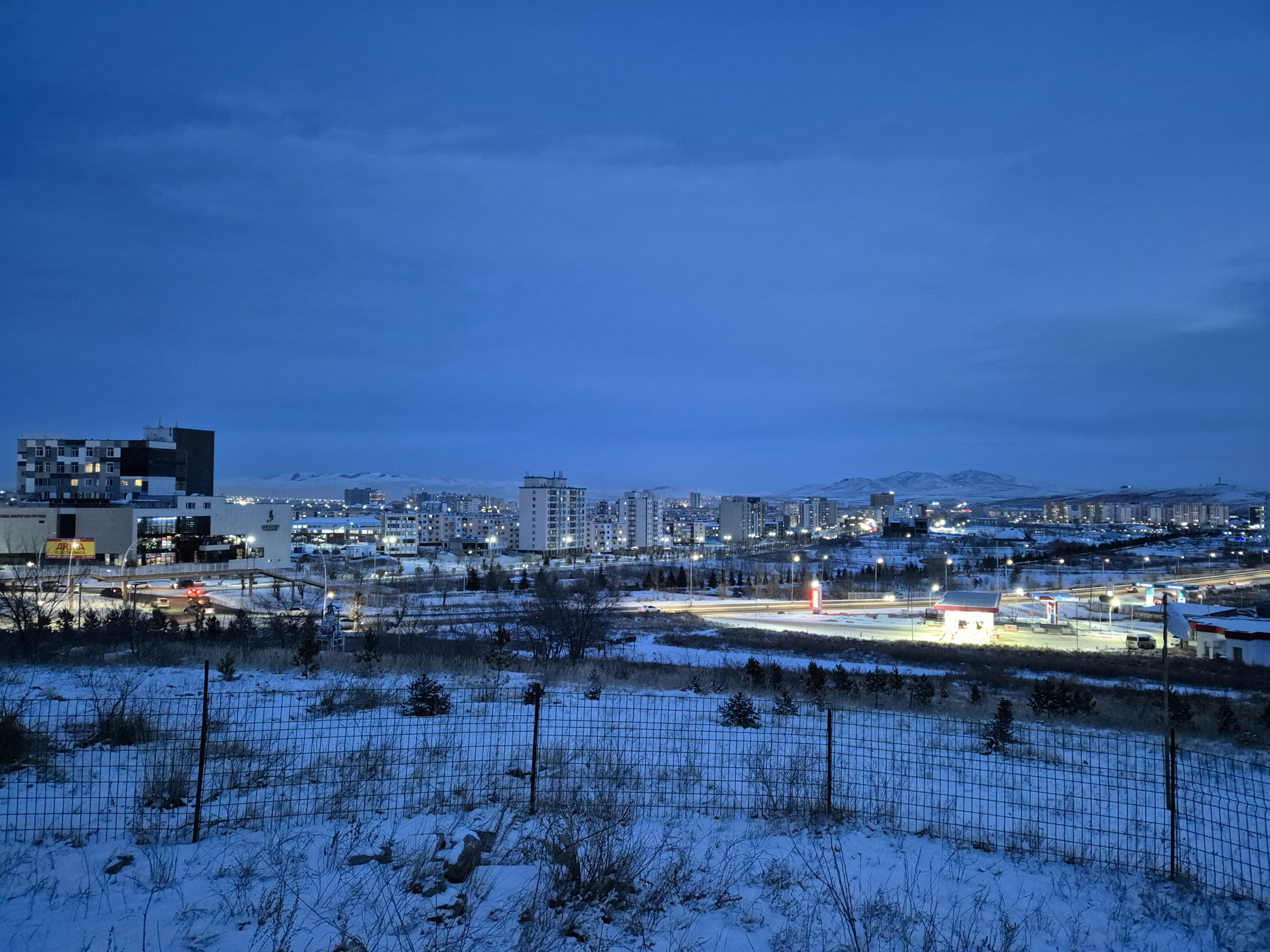
- View of Darkhan

- Location within Mongolia
- Coordinates: 49°28′08″N 105°57′27″E
- Country: Mongolia
- Province: Darkhan-Uul Province
- Founded: October 1961

Government
  - Body: Citizens' Representatives Khural of Darkhan District

Area
  - Total: 103 km^{2} (40 sq mi)
- Elevation: 665 m (2,182 ft)

Population (2022)
  - Total: 87,696
  - Density: 851/km^{2} (2,210/sq mi)
- Time zone: UTC+8 (UTC + 8)
- Postal code: 213800
- Area code: +976 (0)137
- Vehicle registration: ДАx (x variable)
- Climate: Bsk
- Website: https://darkhan.gov.mn/eng/

Darkhan (/ˈdɑːrkɑːn/; Mongolian: Дархан [tárχəɴ]) is the provincial capital of Darkhan-Uul Province in northern Mongolia, and the third-most populous city in the country. The city was built and founded in the late 1960s with Soviet and Eastern Bloc aid.

Situated between the capital Ulaanbaatar and northernmost city Sükhbaatar, Darkhan is a railway junction on the Trans-Mongolian Railway, with branch lines to mining industrial hubs of Erdenet and Sharyngol.

== History ==
16 Davhar Apartment, the tallest building in Mongolia upon its completion in 1985

On October 17, 1961, the city of Darkhan was built with extensive economic assistance from the Comecon. As its name implies, the city was originally conceived to be a manufacturing site for Mongolia's northern territory. Polish specialists built a woodworking plant, brickworks and a lime factory in Darkhan. Hungarians built a meat factory which opened in 1974.

In 1985, the city housed the tallest building in the country when a 16-story apartment was opened.

The city remains a mostly industrial centre and is the home of some 82% of Darkhan-Uul Province's population. As with most urban Mongols, some 86% of the city's population live in residential apartments, with the remaining population living in yurts (gers) on the outskirts of the city.

== Geography ==
With an elevation of 665 metres or 2,182 feet, Darkhan is the capital of the Darkhan-Uul Province. It is a city with notable Soviet influence, evidenced by the huge square buildings and heavy Cyrillic usage. Darkhan is surrounded by mountains and hills, also having some tourist attractions like statues largely being Buddhist attractions. Some parts of the city have wooden houses.

The Kharaa River passes through the western edge of the city.

=== Climate ===
Darkhan has a borderline semi-arid climate (BSk), close to the more typical subarctic climate (Dwc) of northern Mongolia, which is found in higher areas near the city, and only marginally dry enough to avoid qualifying as a humid continental climate (Dwb). These three climate types tend to overlap a good deal over the border regions of Mongolia, Russia and Kazakhstan. This area has extremely cold and dry winters; however the summers are warmer and more humid.

Climate data for Darkhan, 1984–2010
Month	Jan	Feb	Mar	Apr	May	Jun	Jul	Aug	Sep	Oct	Nov	Dec	Year
Mean daily maximum °C (°F)	−16.9 (1.6)	−10.1 (13.8)	1.4 (34.5)	13.1 (55.6)	21.7 (71.1)	27.2 (81.0)	28.4 (83.1)	26.4 (79.5)	19.6 (67.3)	10.7 (51.3)	−3.1 (26.4)	−13.4 (7.9)	8.7 (47.8)
Daily mean °C (°F)	−23.6 (−10.5)	−18.0 (−0.4)	−6.3 (20.7)	4.6 (40.3)	12.4 (54.3)	18.3 (64.9)	20.6 (69.1)	18.4 (65.1)	11.3 (52.3)	2.9 (37.2)	−9.9 (14.2)	−19.6 (−3.3)	0.9 (33.7)
Mean daily minimum °C (°F)	−30.3 (−22.5)	−25.9 (−14.6)	−13.9 (7.0)	−3.9 (25.0)	3.1 (37.6)	9.4 (48.9)	12.8 (55.0)	10.3 (50.5)	2.9 (37.2)	−4.9 (23.2)	−16.6 (2.1)	−25.8 (−14.4)	−6.9 (19.6)
Average precipitation mm (inches)	3.7 (0.15)	3.0 (0.12)	3.6 (0.14)	9.5 (0.37)	20.3 (0.80)	52.1 (2.05)	67.4 (2.65)	67.2 (2.65)	33.8 (1.33)	12.5 (0.49)	7.0 (0.28)	4.6 (0.18)	284.7 (11.21)
Average precipitation days	6.7	5.3	4.5	6.0	7.8	12.3	13.8	12.4	8.5	6.1	6.9	7.7	98
Source: World Meteorological Organization

== Economy ==
The main industry of Darkhan is coal mining. It has also several heavy industries, such as metallurgy, chemical and construction.

In addition, multiple mineral harvesting companies own a large amount of land totaling to 3388.48 acres of land altogether.

== Culture ==
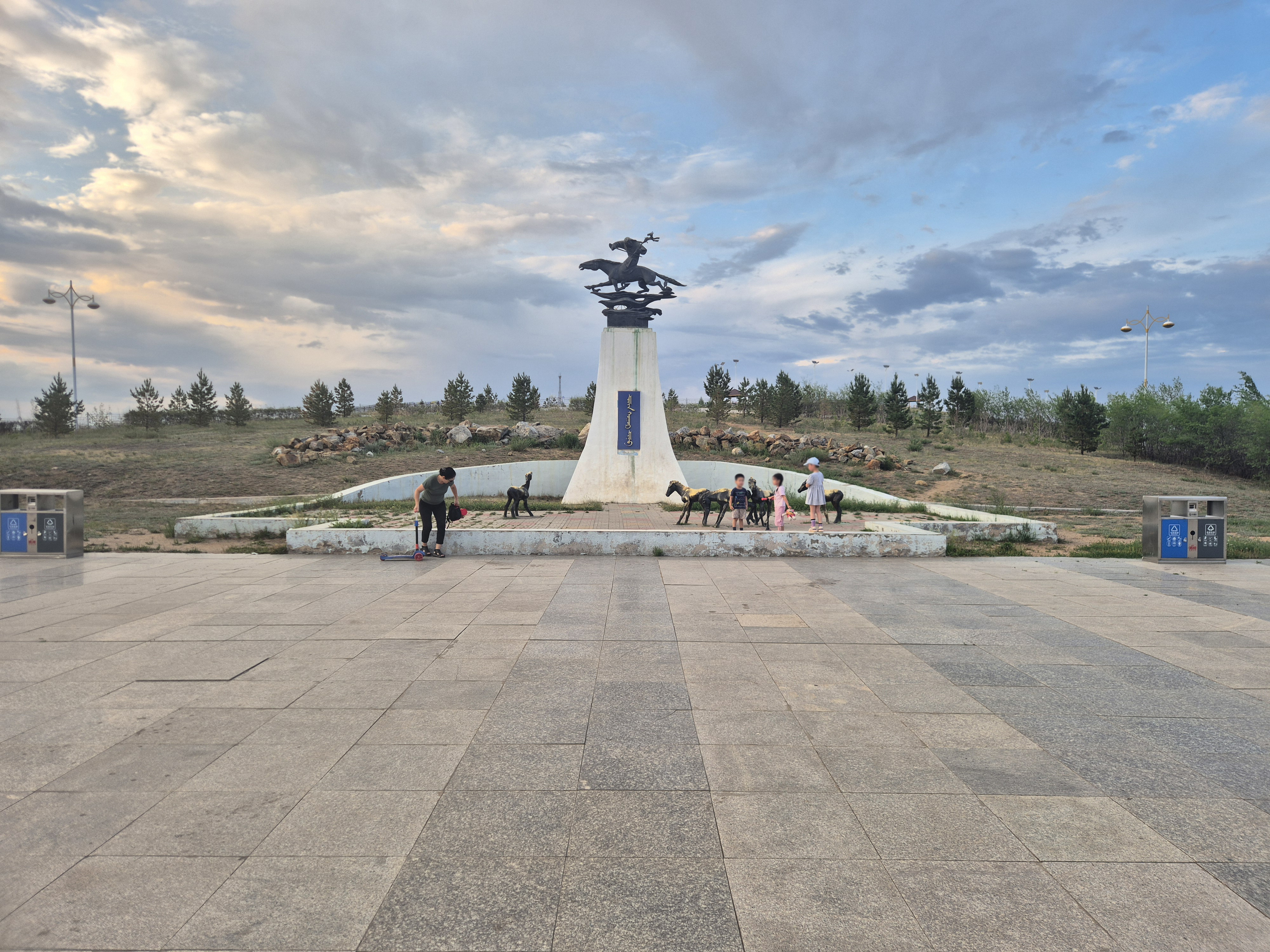
Morin Khuur Complex

The Kharagiin monastery is housed in a log cabin in the old town and has recently become active again as a Buddhist monastery.

In addition, the city hosts the Museum of Darkhan-Uul Province. This museum, also called the Traditional Museum of Folk Art, contains a collection of archaeological findings, traditional clothing, religious artifacts, and taxidermy.

The city has a monument to the horse-head fiddle (morin khuur), the national emblematic instrument of Mongols.

== Education ==
Darkhan is the second largest educational center in Mongolia, making the educational level of the city's population very high. Hundreds of students come to Darkhan from other parts of Mongolia to study. Currently in Darkhan Uul Aimag there are 10 higher education institutions, 25 secondary schools, 14 kindergartens, the Institute of Management and Development, the Regional Business Development Center and the Plant Science and Agricultural Training Research Institute.

== Politics ==
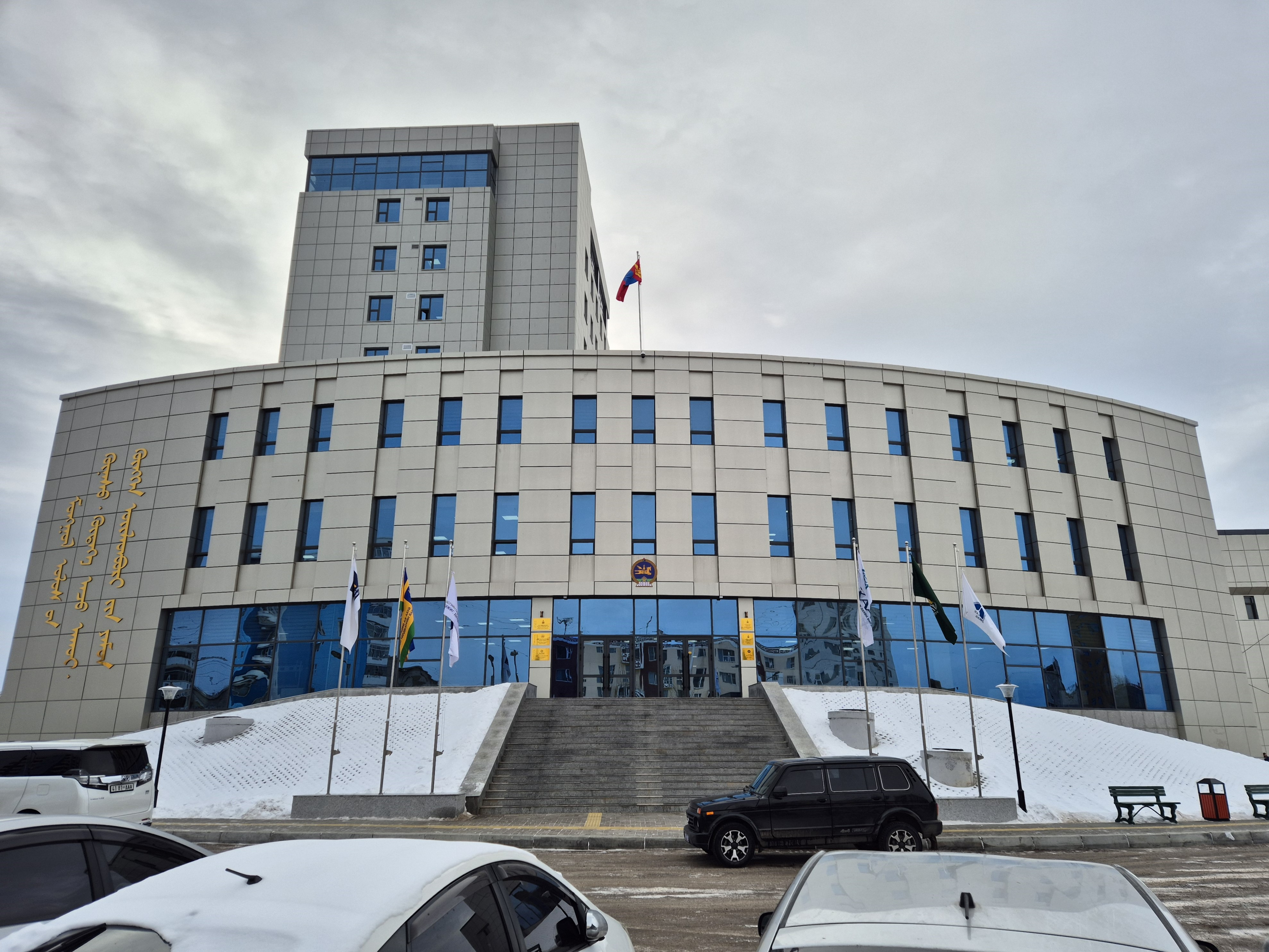
Ministry of Food, Agriculture and Light Industry

Darkhan houses the Ministry of Food, Agriculture and Light Industry.

== Infrastructure ==
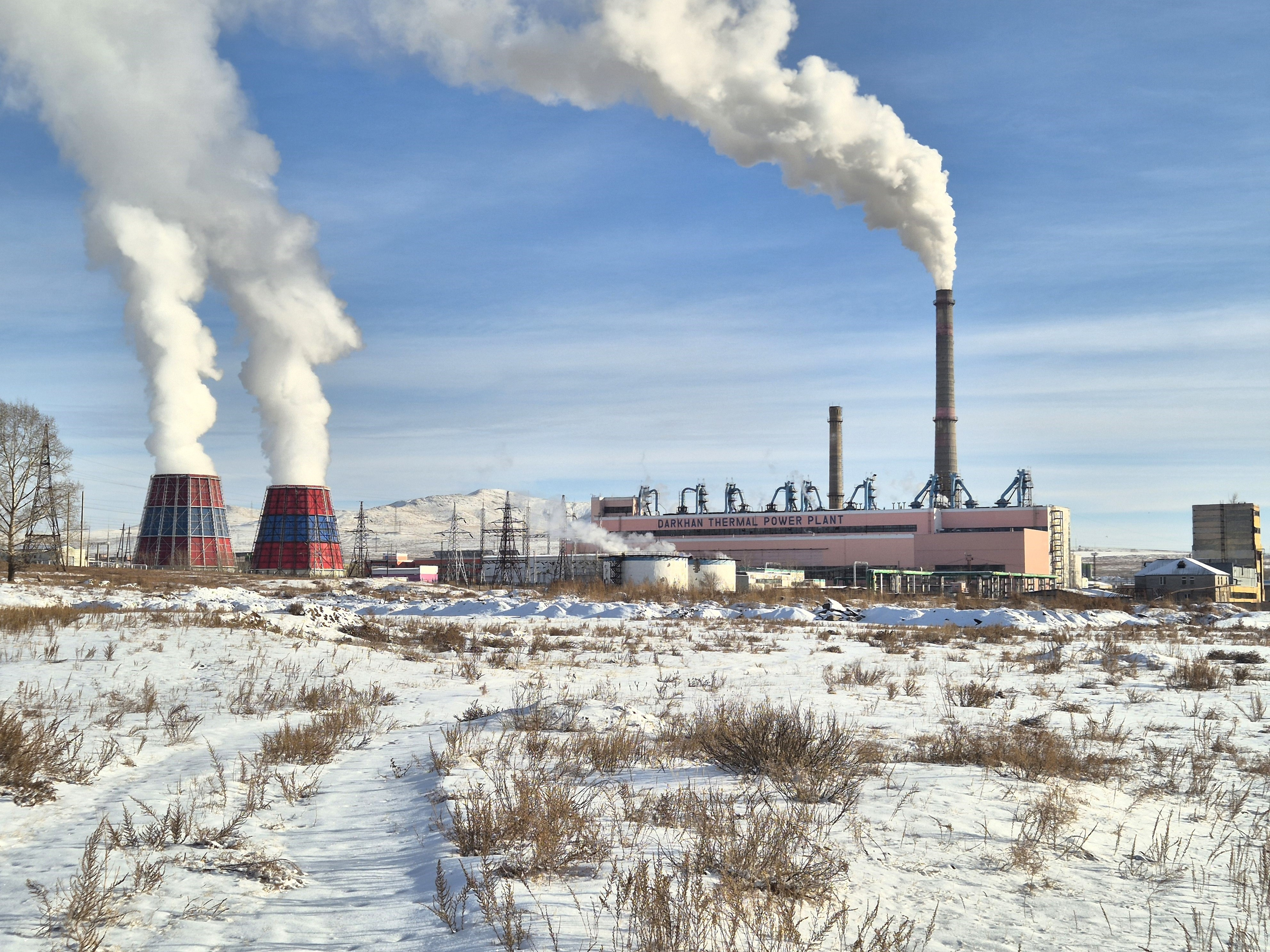
Darkhan Thermal Power Plant

The city is powered by the Darkhan Thermal Power Plant through its 110 kV overhead power line. Excess power is also supplied to Sükhbaatar, the provincial capital of Selenge Province, and Ulaanbaatar, the national capital.

Waste water is treated at the Darkhan Wastewater Treatment Plant before being discharged to the nearby river. The city is served by the Darkhan General Hospital.

== Tourist attractions ==
- Darkhan 50 Complex
- Morin Khuur Complex
- My Mongolia Park
- My Mongolia Park Stadium
- Museum of Darkhan-Uul Province

== Transportation ==
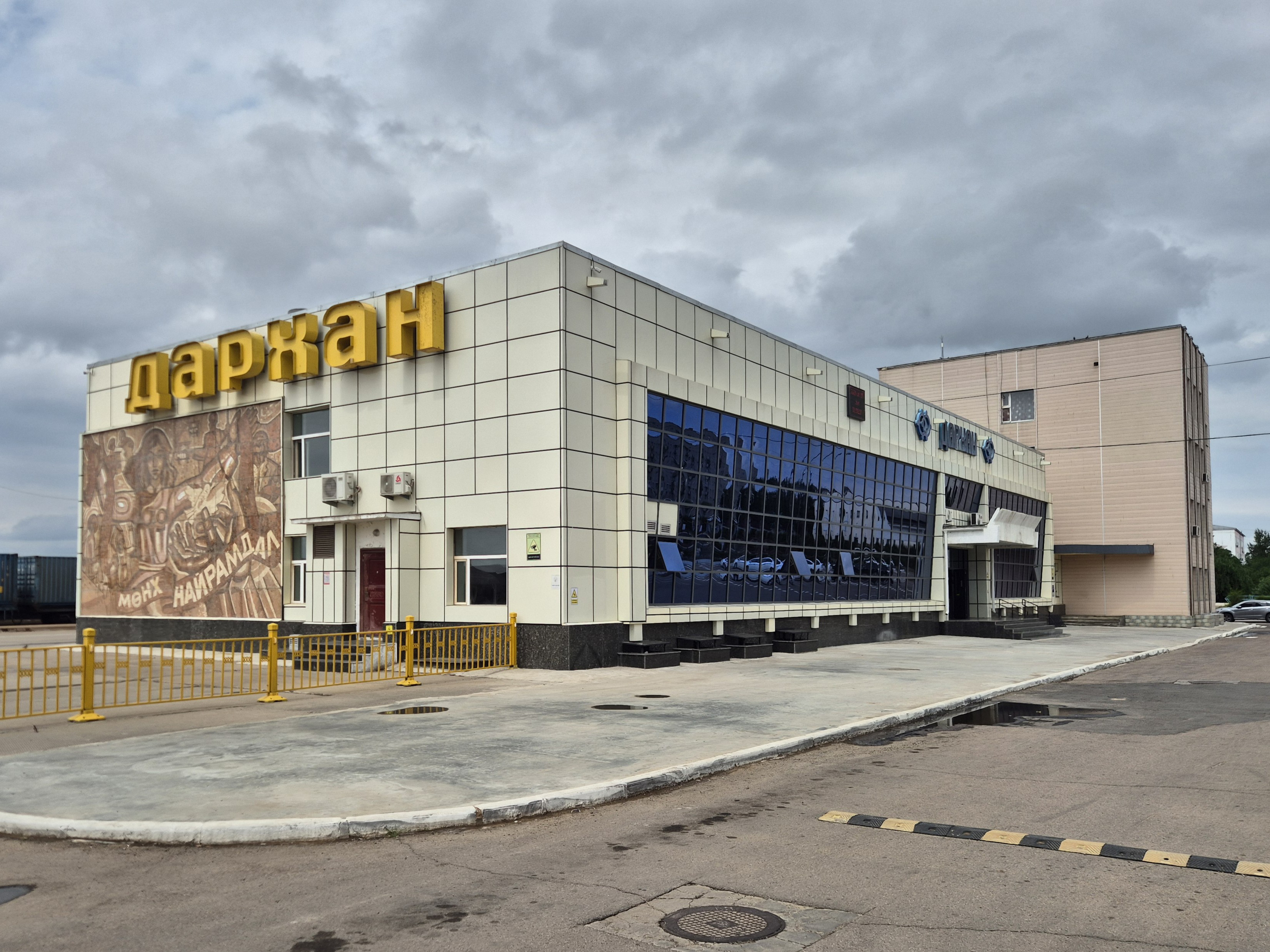
Darkhan-1 railway station

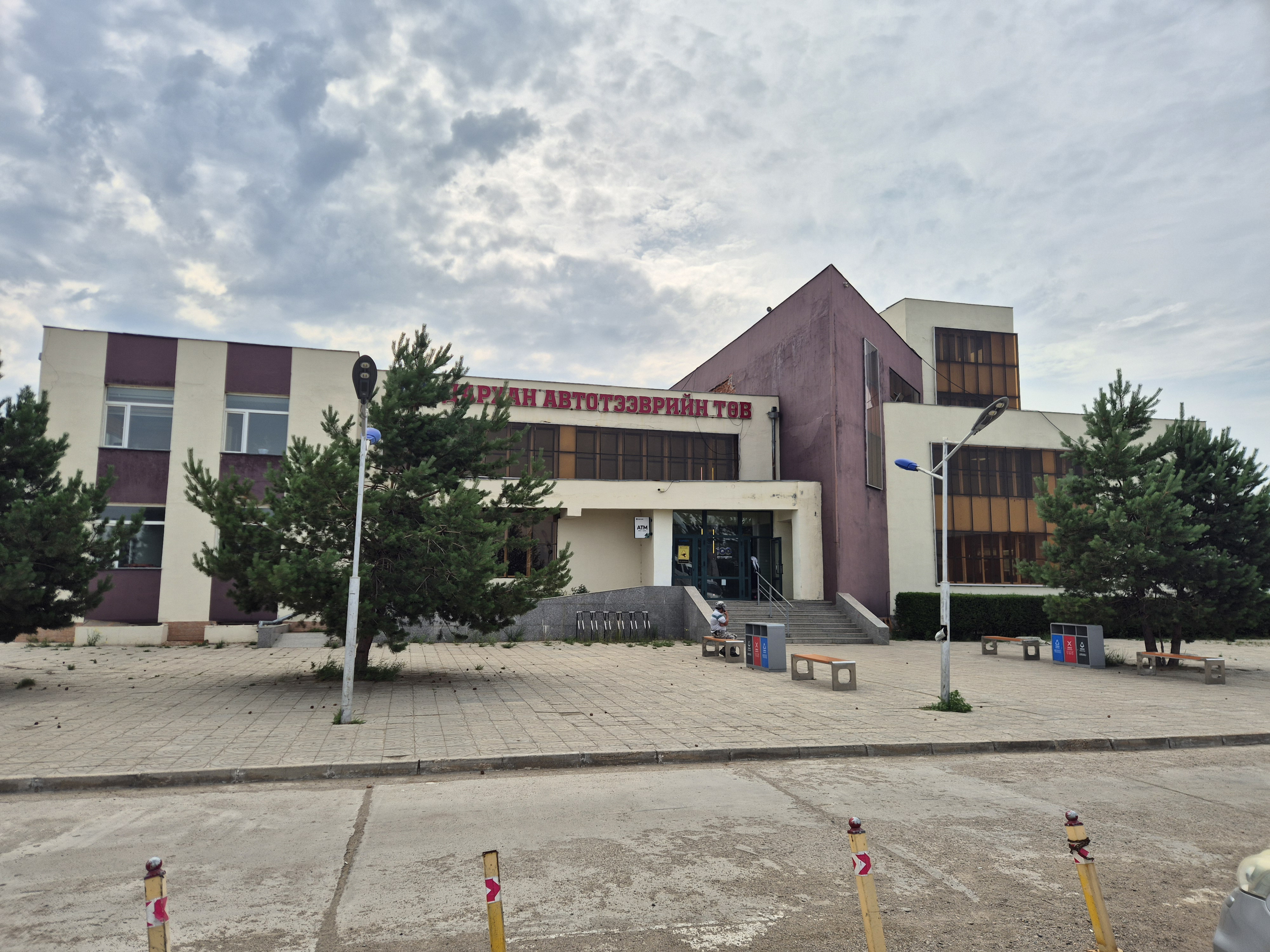
Darkhan Bus Station

Darkhan is served by the Darkhan-1 railway station in the north and Darkhan-2 railway station in the south. The Trans-Mongolian Railway branches to Erdenet, the second-largest city, in the west, and Sharyngol in the east. Darkhan is connected by four-lane road to Ulaanbaatar for a length of 204 km along the AH3.

== Partner cities ==
Darkhan is partnered with:

- Dimitrovgrad, Bulgaria
- Irving, United States
- Kaposvár, Hungary
- Ulan-Ude, Russia
- Zeitz, Germany

== Notable people ==
- Tsogto Amara (1979–), kickboxer
- Uyanga Bataa (1996–), bodybuilder
- Ölziitögs Luvsandorj (1972–), writer
- Dorjpalamyn Narmandakh (1975–), judoka
- Pürevjavyn Önörbat (1988–), wrestler
- Davaasükhiin Otgontsetseg (1990–), wrestler
- Pürevjavyn Temüüjin (1994–), taekwondo athlete
