= Darkhan-Uul Province =

Province of Mongolia

Darkhan-Uul Province Дархан-Уул аймаг ᠳᠠᠷᠬᠠᠨᠠᠭᠤᠯᠠᠠᠶᠢᠮᠠᠭ
- Province
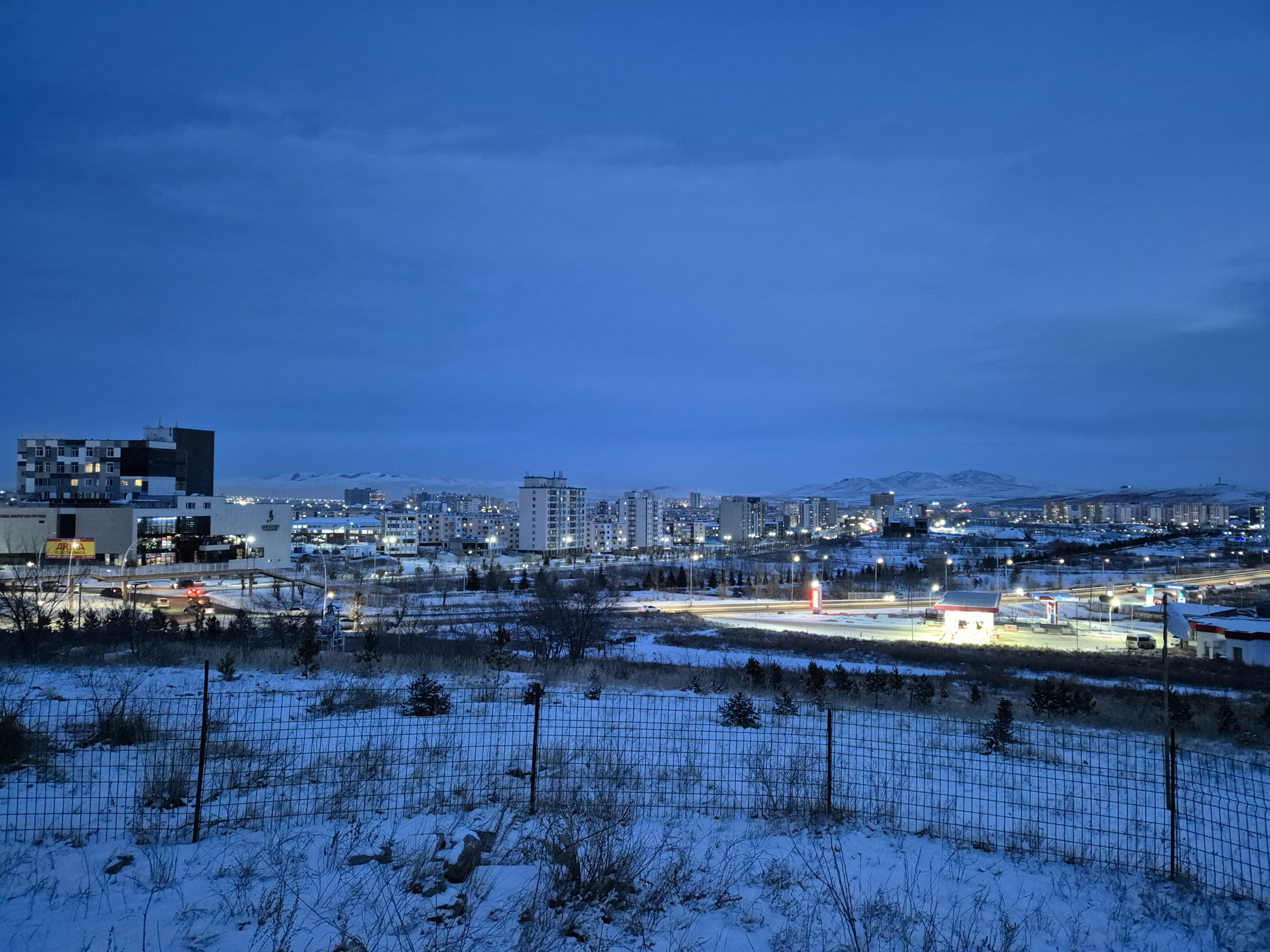
- Darkhan

- Flag Coat of arms

- Coordinates: 49°30′N 106°15′E
- Country: Mongolia
- Established: 1994
- Capital: Darkhan

Area
  - Total: 3,275 km^{2} (1,264 sq mi)
- Elevation: 1,049 m (3,442 ft)

Population (2025)
  - Total: 105,122
  - Density: 32.10/km^{2} (83.13/sq mi)

GDP
  - Total: MNT 756 billion US$ 0.2 billion (2022)
  - Per capita: MNT 7,222,080; US$ 2,312 (2022)
- Time zone: UTC+8
- Area code: +976 (0)137
- ISO 3166 code: MN-037
- Vehicle registration: ДА_
- Website: darkhan.gov.mn

Darkhan-Uul (Mongolian: Дархан-Уул [tárχəɴ‿ʊ́ːɬ]; lit. 'Mount Blacksmith') is one of the 21 provinces of Mongolia. It is located in the northern part of the country.

== History ==
The city Darkhan was founded on 17 October 1961 within Selenge Province as a second industrial center to reduce migration pressure on the capital, Ulaanbaatar.

The Darkhan City was carved out of the Selenge Province in 1994 and was upgraded to Darkhan-Uul Province according to the Law on the Administrative Units of Mongolia and their Governance, which was passed through Parliament Resolution 32 of 1994.

== Geography ==
The province has a total area of 3,270 km^{2}. It is located at an elevation of 707 meters above sea level. The land of the province is agricultural (71.0%), forest (22.4%), water (0.7%) and other use (1.5%).

=== Climate ===
The maximum temperature is 42.6°C in July and the minimum temperature is -43.7°C in January. The average annual precipitation is 310–320 mm.

== Administrative subdivisions ==
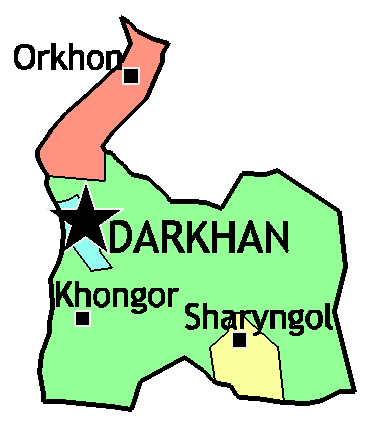
Sums of Darkhan-Uul

The sums of Darkhan-Uul Aimag
Sum	Mongolian	Population (2002)	Population (2004)	Population (2006)	Population (2008)	Population (2009)	Area (km^{2})	Density (/km^{2})
Darkhan*	Дархан	70,029	74,275	73,457	75,104	74,454	103	722.85
Khongor	Хонгор	5,628	5,390	5,404	5,115	5,603	2,533	2.21
Orkhon	Орхон	3,435	2,913	2,932	3,076	3,185	478	6.66
Sharyngol*	Шарынгол	8,376	7,848	7,634	7,798	8,116	160.6	50.54

^{*} - urban settlement

== Demographics ==
As of 2017, the province has a total population of more than 110,000 people. In 2019, the population of the province was 104,090, spread over 30,574 households. Among them, 86,851 people lived in Darkhan City.

== Economy ==
In 2018, the province contributed to 1.36% of the total national GDP of Mongolia.

=== Agriculture ===
Darkhan Uul Aimag is situated in the agricultural heartland of Mongolia and is a major agricultural producer in the country, with rich resources for agricultural development. Located at a low altitude, this area has a warmer climate than the rest of the country. The Kharaa River basin offers favorable natural climatic conditions for the cultivation of cereals, vegetables, and especially potatoes. There are 35 agricultural companies and co-operatives in Darkhan Uul Aimag. This area comprises 30,000 hectares of soil suitable for arable farming and 1287.8 thousand hectares for vegetable farming. Despite the development of the urban economy, local people continue to engage in livestock herding, with approximately 130,000 head of livestock in the province.

=== Manufacturing ===
The province has metal and steel factory, cement factory, heavy machinery, leather processing factory, meat processing factory, chemical manufacturing facilities and warehouse for crude oil products.

== Culture and Recreation ==
Located in the heart of Darkhan city, My Mongolia Park has become a focal point for both leisure and community life in the province. Since its opening in 2007, the park has grown into a 28-hectare green space where families gather for seasonal festivals, outdoor concerts, and weekend picnics. A miniature railway, introduced in 2021, offers rides through landscaped gardens, while modern playgrounds and open lawns provide year-round recreation.

The adjacent My Mongolia Park Stadium, completed in 2022, hosts regional football matches and athletics competitions, reflecting Darkhan-Uul’s ambition to develop modern sports infrastructure alongside its cultural venues.

== Sustainability ==
In September 2026, the provincial government signed a memorandum of understanding with the United Nations Development Programme (UNDP) to launch green and inclusive cities on Darkhan City. The program is funded by the Global Environment Facility and implemented by the Ministry of Environment and Climate Change with the support of UNDP. The project would focus on flood management, food security, greywater reuse, riparian zone restoration and waste management.

== Transport ==
Darkhan is the point where the side line to Erdenet forks off the main line of the Trans-Mongolian Railway.
