= Baganuur =

District in Ulaanbaatar, Mongolia

Baganuur District Багануур дүүрэг ᠪᠠᠭᠠᠨᠠᠭᠤᠷᠲᠡᠭᠦᠷᠭᠡ
- Municipal District
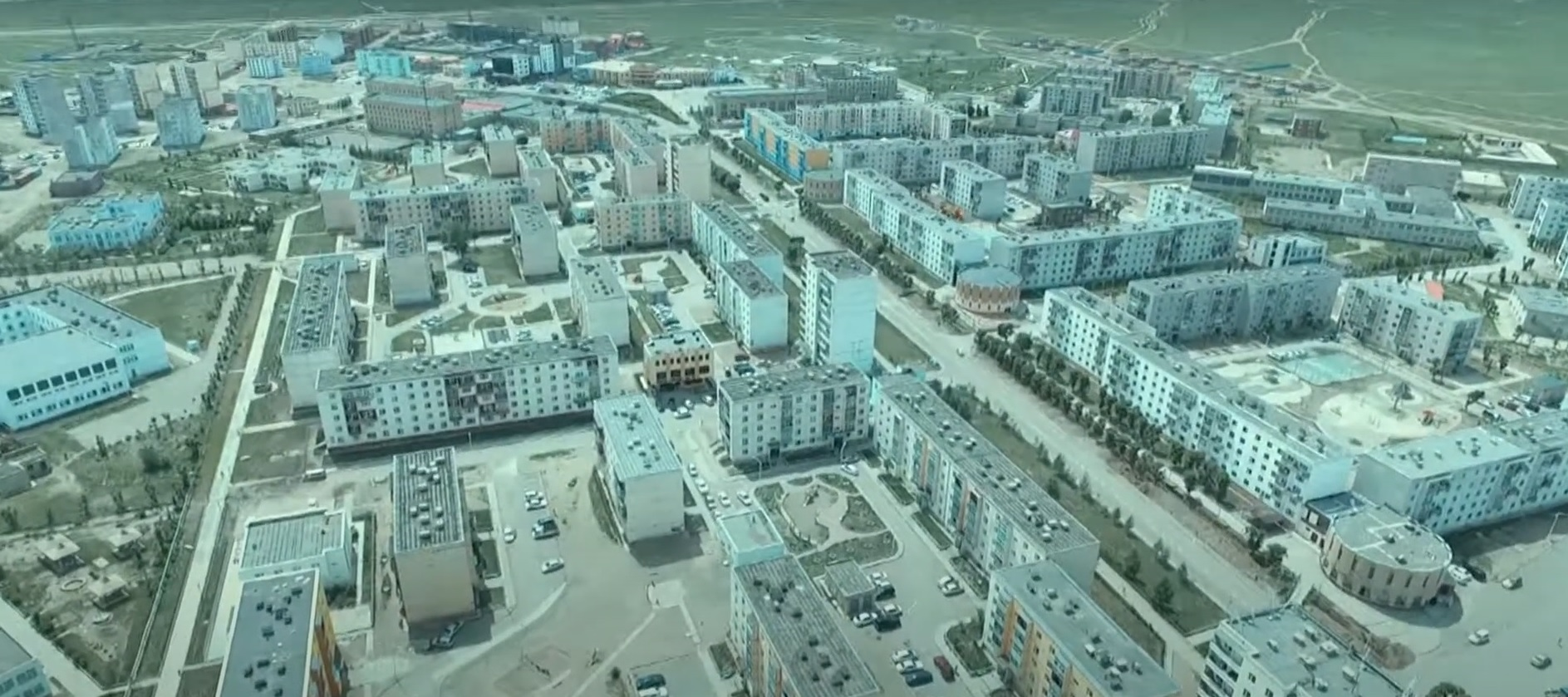

- Flag Coat of arms

- Location within Mongolia
- Country: Mongolia
- Municipality: Ulaanbaatar
- Raion of Ulaanbaatar: 1980
- Reorganized as district: 1992

Government
  - Body: Citizens' Representatives Khural of the Baganuur district
  - Governor of District: S.Davaasüren

Area
  - Total: 620.2 km^{2} (239.5 sq mi)
- Elevation: 1,349 m (4,426 ft)

Population (2024)
  - Total: 28,926
- Time zone: UTC+8 (UTC + 8)
- Area code: +976 (0) 21
- Website: http://bnd.ub.gov.mn/

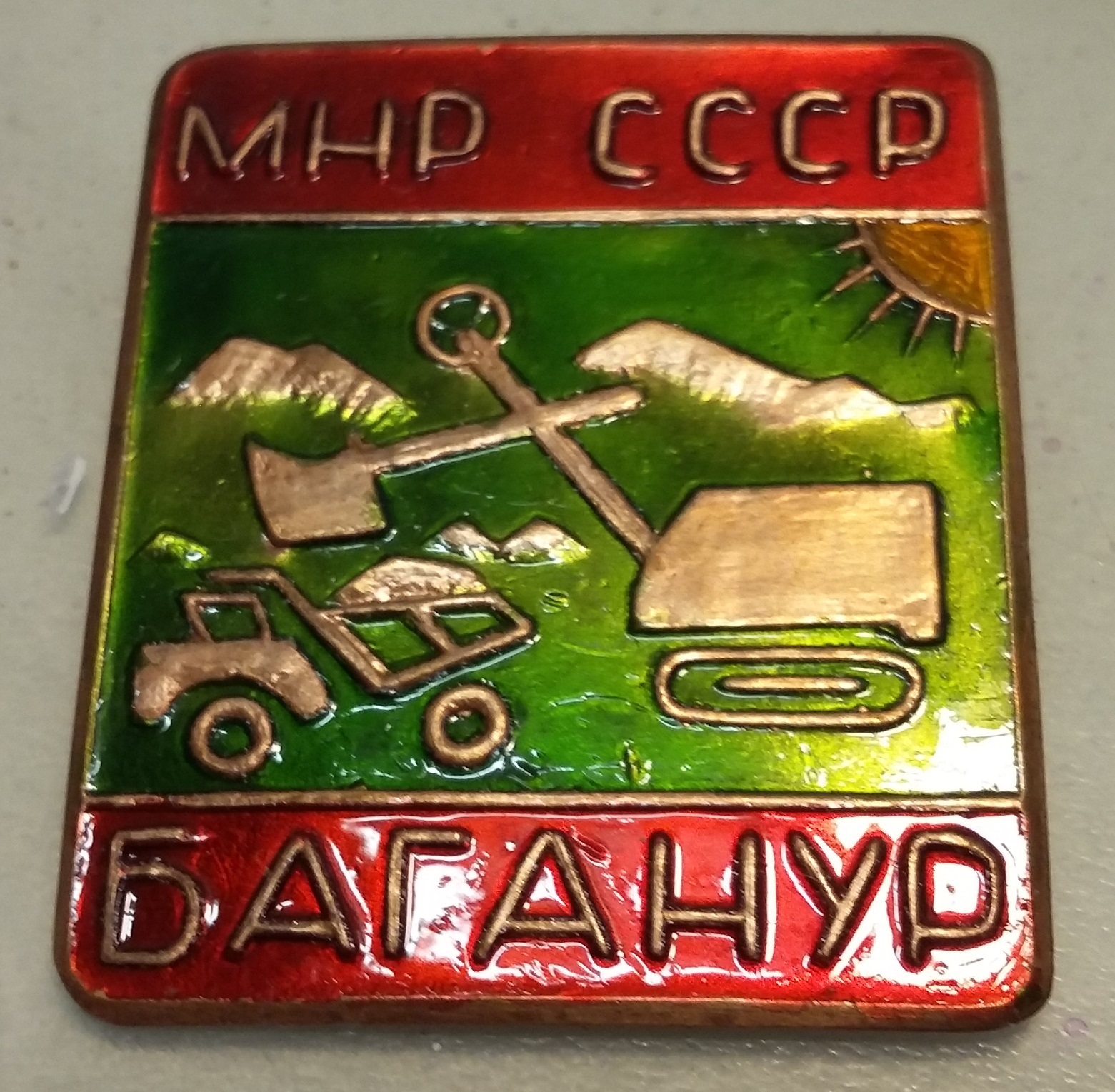
Baganuur coal mine 1970-1980s pin badge.

Baganuur (Mongolian: Багануур, ᠪᠠᠭᠠᠨᠠᠭᠤᠷ, Little Lake) is one of nine düüregs (districts) of the Mongolian capital of Ulaanbaatar. It is subdivided into five khoroos (subdistricts).

Baganuur is a remote district and exclave covering 620 square kilometres (239 sq mi), situated on the border between Töv and Khentii aimags. Originally established as a Soviet military base for the 12th Motor Rifle Division, it later became the site of Mongolia’s largest open-pit coal mine. Baganuur is one of Mongolia's major industrial centers, particularly in coal production, and ranks among Mongolia’s ten largest cities. Efforts are ongoing to separate its administration from the capital and designate it as an independent city.

== Transportation ==
Baganuur is the endpoint of a side line of the Trans-Mongolian Railway, which connects to the main line in Bagakhangai. Due to high operation cost, Mongolian Railway had stopped passenger service on the Ulaanbaatar-Baganuur-Ulaanbaatar, although freight trains still normally transport coal to Ulaanbaatar and other neighbouring towns. Baganuur is also accessible via 138 km of paved road completed in 2004.

== 2008 methanol scare ==
On December 31, 2007, Baganuur became the center of a massive methanol poisoning case that stemmed from substandard production methods of a local vodka manufacturer. The poison killed 14 people and hospitalized dozens of others. This case led to a complete ban of vodka sales in Ulaanbaatar for several days, and also highlighted one of Mongolia's food safety problems.

== Climate ==
Baganuur has a dry-winter subarctic climate (Köppen Dwc).

Climate data for Baganuur, 1991–2010
Month	Jan	Feb	Mar	Apr	May	Jun	Jul	Aug	Sep	Oct	Nov	Dec	Year
Mean daily maximum °C (°F)	−17.6 (0.3)	−10.8 (12.6)	−1.4 (29.5)	9.4 (48.9)	17.6 (63.7)	23.0 (73.4)	24.6 (76.3)	22.5 (72.5)	16.8 (62.2)	7.1 (44.8)	−5.7 (21.7)	−14.9 (5.2)	5.9 (42.6)
Mean daily minimum °C (°F)	−34.0 (−29.2)	−27.8 (−18.0)	−18.0 (−0.4)	−7.0 (19.4)	0.6 (33.1)	7.4 (45.3)	10.9 (51.6)	8.3 (46.9)	0.6 (33.1)	−8.3 (17.1)	−22.5 (−8.5)	−30.8 (−23.4)	−10.0 (13.9)
Average precipitation mm (inches)	2.5 (0.10)	2.3 (0.09)	4.0 (0.16)	6.1 (0.24)	18.3 (0.72)	36.4 (1.43)	57.2 (2.25)	51.1 (2.01)	20.9 (0.82)	8.6 (0.34)	4.0 (0.16)	3.7 (0.15)	215.1 (8.47)
Average precipitation days	3.8	3.4	4.5	5.8	7.2	12.9	16.5	13.8	7.9	4.9	4.4	3.8	88.9
Source: World Meteorological Organization
