= List of mines in Mongolia =

This list of mines in Mongolia is subsidiary to the list of mines article and lists working, defunct and future mines in the country and is organised by the primary mineral output. For practical purposes stone, marble and other quarries may be included in this list.

== Coal and iron ==
Location of Coal and Iron Mines in Mongolia

=== Iron ===
Mine	Province	Coordinates	Town	Owner	Dates
Tamir Gol	Arkhangai	47°35′20″N 102°15′0″E	Tüvshrüülekh sum		

=== Coal ===
Mine	Province	Coordinates	Town	Owner	Dates
Aduunchuluun	Dornod	48°07′30″N 114°32′15″E	Choibalsan		
Chandgana Tal	Khentii	47°23′12″N 110°01′41″E	Mörön sum	Prophecy Coal Company	1967 -
Eldev	Dornogovi	46°07′06″N 108°59′35″E	Dalanjargalan	Mongolyn Alt Corporation LLC	
Erds					
Khushuut	Khovd	46°48′12″N 93°18′20″E	Darvi sum		
Khuut	Dornod	46°58′N 114°50′E	Matad sum		
Nariin Sukhait; Ovoot Tolgoi	Ömnögovi	43°00′08″N 101°15′38″E	Gurvan tes sum	Mongolyn Alt Corporation LLC, JV "Qinhua-MAK-Nariin Sukhait" LLC, South Gobi Energy Resources Inc	
Nuurst Khotgor	Uvs	49°51′12″N 90°53′23″E	Bökhmörön		1963 -
Övdög Khudag	Dundgovi	45°34′40″N 107°52′20″E	Bayanjargalan sum	Mogul Ventures Corp	
Saikhan-Ovoo	Bulgan	48°48′18″N 102°25′10″E	Saikhan-Ovoo	Asia Coal Ltd.	
Tavan Tolgoi	Ömnögovi	43°37′30″N 105°28′27″E	Tsogttsetsii sum	Erdenes MGL	
Tevshiin Govi	Dundgovi	45°59′43″N 106°7′45″E	Saintsagaan sum	Tevshiin Govi LLC	1990-
Tsaidam Lake	Töv	47°7′0″N 107°54′0″E	Bayan sum	Tsetsens Mining and Energy LLC	
Tugrugnuur					
Ulaan Ovoo	Selenge	50°19′4″N 104°58′25″E	Tüshig sum	Prophecy Coal Company	2010 -
Sharyn Gol	Darkhan-Uul	49°15′N 106°26′E	Sharyngol sum	Sharyn Gol Jsc	
Mogoin Gol	Khövsgöl	49°22′N 97°50′E	Tsetserleg sum	Mogoin Gol Jsc; Aspire Mining Ltd	

== Metals ==
Location of Ore Mines in Mongolia
Copper

Gold

Tungsten

=== Copper ===
Mine	Province	Coordinates	Town	Owner	Dates
Oyuu Tolgoi	Ömnögovi	43°00′30″N 106°50′35″E	Khanbogd sum	Ivanhoe Mines Mongolia Inc	
Erdenet	Orkhon	49°01′40″N 104°02′40″E	Erdenet	Erdenet Mining Corporation	
Khökh-Adar	Bayan-Ölgii	48°18′N 90°22′E	Tolbo sum	EAM Khukh Adar	
Tsagaan Suvarga	Dornogovi	43°51′40″N 108°20′10″E	Mandakh sum	Mongolyn Alt Corporation	

=== Gold ===
Mine	Province	Coordinates	Town	Owner	Dates
Tavt	Bulgan	50°07′N 102°28′E	Teshig sum	AFK-Tavt LLC	
Boroo	Selenge	48°44′45″N 106°10′10″E	Bayangol sum / Mandal sum	Centerra Gold	
Gatsuurt	Selenge	48°38′09″N 106°38′02″E	Mandal sum	Centerra Gold	
Oyuu Tolgoi	Ömnögovi	43°00′30″N 106°50′35″E	Khanbogd sum	Ivanhoe Mines Mongolia Inc	

=== Niobium ===
Mine	Province	Coordinates	Town	Owner	Dates
Ulaan Tolgoi	Uvs	49°27′0″N 93°1′59″E	Naranbulag		

=== Tungsten ===
Mine	Province	Coordinates	Town	Owner	Dates
Ulaan Uul	Bayan-Ölgii	49°13′35″N 90°14′15″E	Nogoonnuur sum		
Bürentsogt	Sükhbaatar	46°44′19″N 111°42′03″E	Mönkhkhaan sum		
Khovd Gol	Bayan-Ölgii	48°43′27″N 88°50′13″E	Tsengel sum	SS Mongolia Ltd.	
