= Mining in Mongolia =

Economic sector of Mongolia

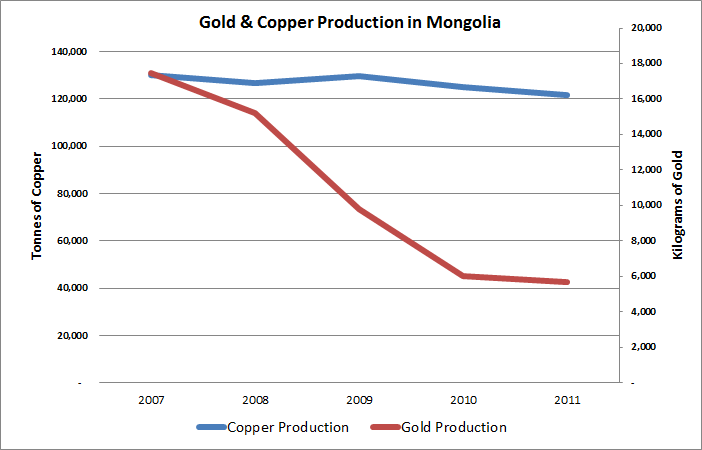
Mongolia's copper and gold production rates from 2007 through 2011

Mining is important to the national economy of Mongolia. Mongolia is one of the 29 resource-rich developing countries identified by the International Monetary Fund and exploration of copper and coal deposits are generating substantial additional revenue.

As of 2023, only 45% of Mongolian territory had been mapped geologically at a 150,000 scale. As of June 2021, active mineral licenses cover nearly 4% of the territory.

Coal, copper, and gold are the principal reserves mined in Mongolia. Several gold mines are located about 110 kilometres (68 mi) north of Ulaanbaatar, such as Boroo Gold Mine and Gatsuurt Gold Mine. Khotgor Coal Mine is an open-pit coal mining site about 120 kilometres (75 mi) west of Ulaangom. Ömnögovi Province, in the south of Mongolia, is home to large scale mining projects such as the Tavan Tolgoi coal mine and the Oyu Tolgoi copper mine. Oyu Tolgoi mine is reported to have the potential to boost the national economy by a third but is subject to dispute over how the profits should be shared. The International Monetary Fund (IMF) has estimated that 71 percent of the income from the mine would go to Mongolia.

Mongolia Energy Corporation, a mining and energy company operating in Mongolia and Xinjiang and Erdenet Mining Corporation, a joint Mongolian-Russian venture, account for a large percentage of the mining in the country, but Anglo-Australian companies such as Rio Tinto and Canadian companies such as Turquoise Hill Resources are active in the country and have agreements with the government. The government institution responsible for overseeing mining development in the country is the Mineral Resources and Petroleum Authority (MRPAM).

In 2024, the Mongolian Parliament enacted legislation to establish a sovereign wealth fund, known as the "Chinggis Fund," aimed at reallocating revenues from the country's mineral resources to benefit all citizens. This initiative seeks to address social inequality by channeling profits from "strategic" mines into long-term investments in health, education, and housing.

== Coal mining ==
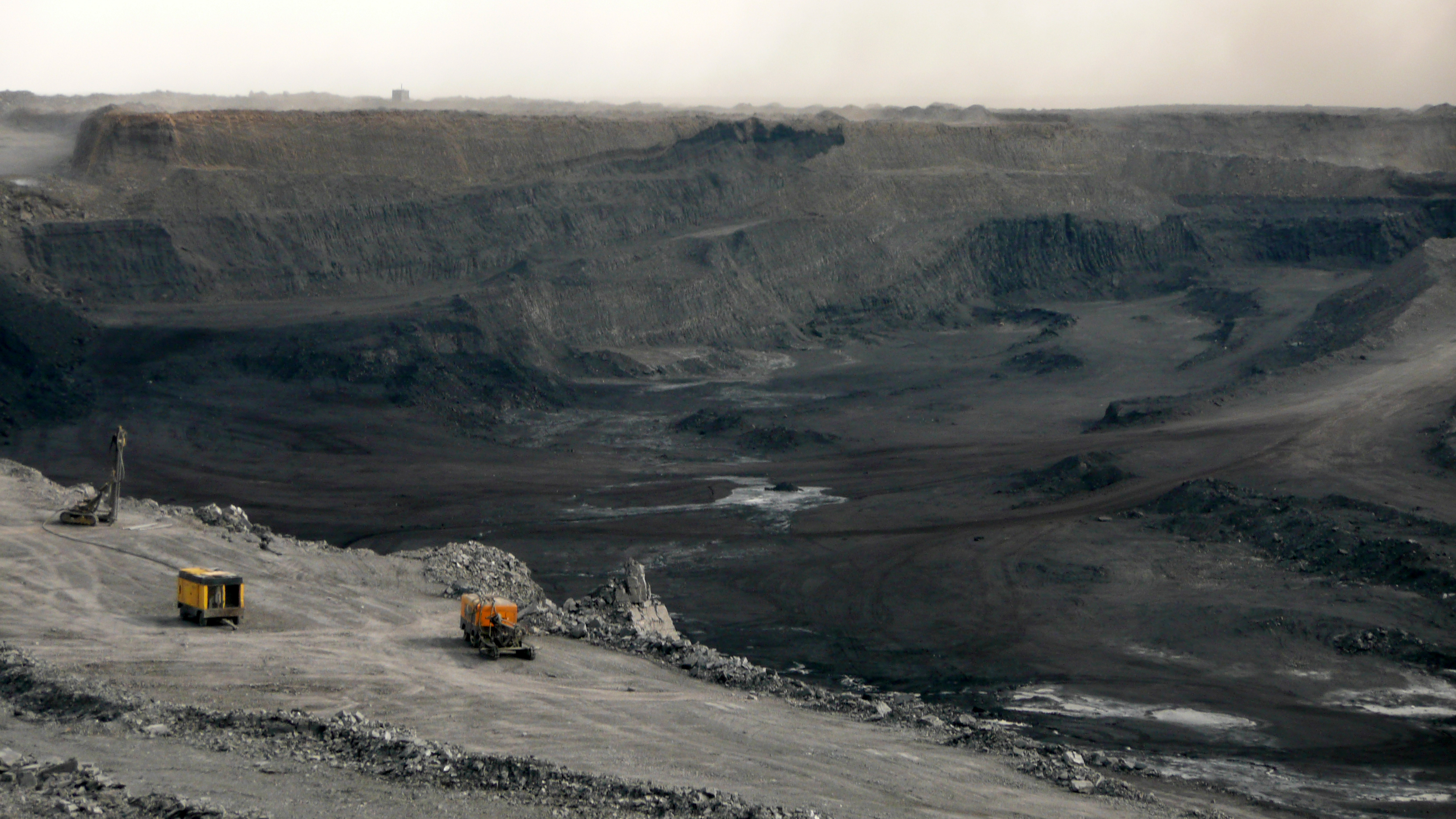
Tavan Tolgoi coal mine in Ömnögovi Province

Mongolia hosts 0.2% of the world's known coal reserves, which was an estimated 162 billion tonnes in 2011 with 17 operating coal mines. Mongolia exported 73% of the 25 million tons of coal produced in 2010, making it the country's largest export (which had previously been copper). The largest customer for coal was China, accounting for over 82% of all exported coal. The Tavan Tolgoi, the largest coal site in Mongolia, which has high-grade coal deposits is expected to yield six billion tonnes of coal. While the biggest client for this coal is China (Mongolia's trade with China is about 85%), Russia is also likely to be the bidder for this coal once the 1,000-kilometre (621-mile) rail link to the country is completed; Japan, Korea and Taiwan are also likely to be beneficiaries to this coal through the Trans-Siberian Railway. Mongolia has also initiated coal based power projects and coal-washing plants which will be beneficial to its economic advancement. Coal mining companies include Hunnu Coal.

=== Mines ===
- Khuut
- Övdög Khudag
- Saikhan-Ovoo
- Tevshiin Govi

== Copper mining ==
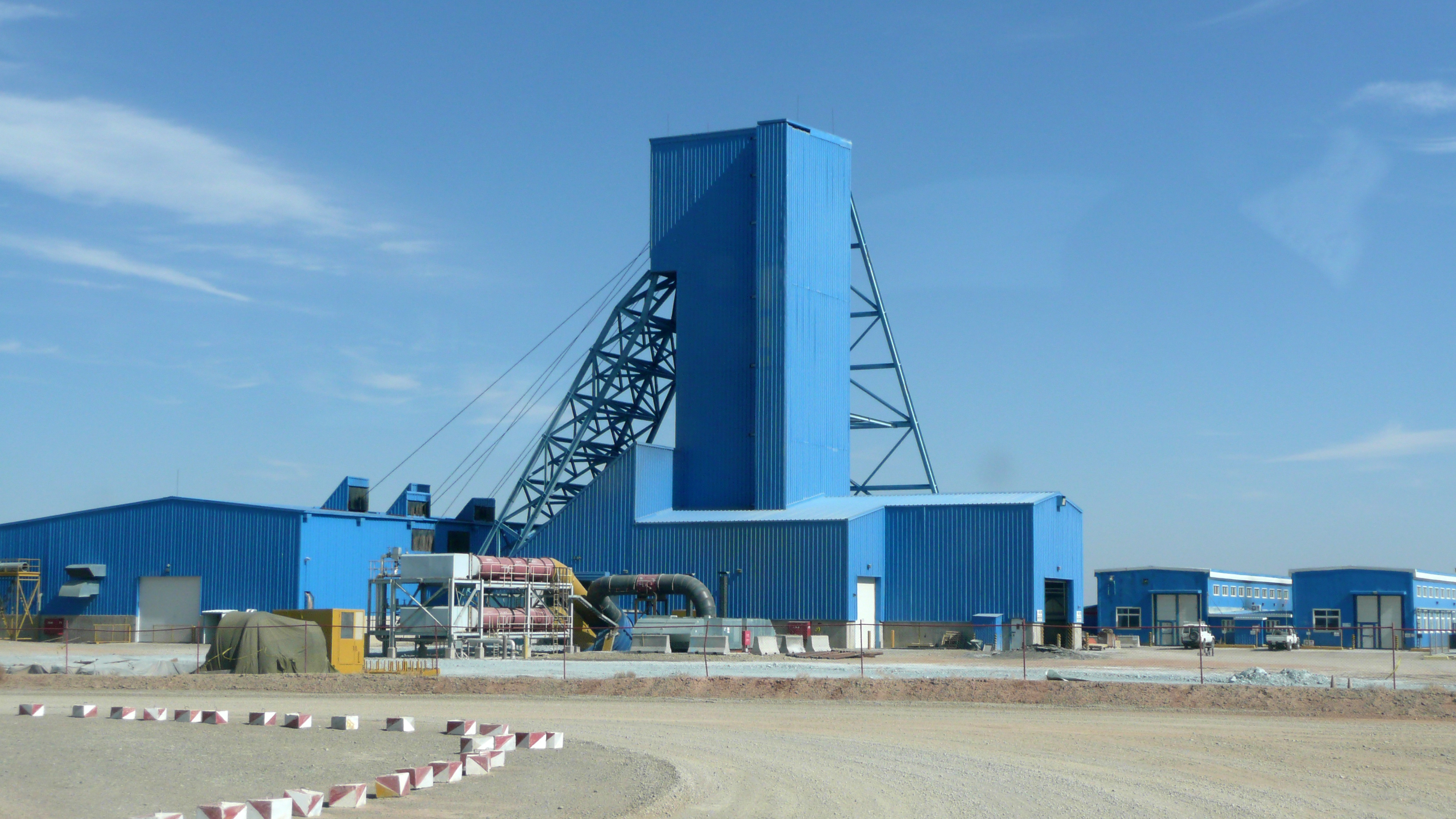
Shaft #1 at Oyu Tolgoi copper mine in Ömnögovi Province

Erdenet Mining Corporation is a joint venture between the governments of Mongolia and Russia and was established in 1976. As of 2007 Erdenet was accounted for 14% of Mongolia's gross domestic product (GDP). While the mine has been exporting copper concentrate since production began, there are plans to create industry within the country to manufacture finished products (such as copper wire) from concentrate from the mine.

In 2001 Canadian-based Ivanhoe Mines (now known as Turquoise Hill Resources) discovered the gold-copper ore deposit of what would be developed into the Oyu Tolgoi mine. The deposit is in the Gobi Desert in an area known as Oyu Tolgoi (Mongolian for Turquoise Hill), where in the time of Genghis Khan outcropping rocks were smelted for copper. By 2003 there were 18 exploration drill rigs on the property employing approximately 200 people, and Oyu Tolgoi was the "biggest mining exploration project in the world". In January 2013 Oyu Tolgoi started producing concentrate from the mine. Its location in the South Gobi province, is 50 miles away from the border with China and is termed as a mega-mine in Mongolia. Its mining operations are a joint venture of Rio Tinto (a UK-based mining transnational), Ivanhoe Mines of Canada and the Mongolian government. As of 2010, the estimated cost of bringing the Oyu Tolgoi mine into production was US$4.6 billion, making it (financially) the largest project in Mongolian history; however, by 2013 costs had increased to $10 billion. When in production Oyu Tolgoi will account for more than 30% of Mongolia's GDP. The copper production from this mine (the investment was reported to be of the order of US$5 billion) has been projected at 450,000 tonnes of copper for the next 50 years; the mining reserves are reported to extend up to 20 miles beneath the Gobi Desert and is also estimated to yield 330,000 ounces of gold annually. A comparative analysis of its progress in 2011 revealed that it exceeded China's progress by double and recorded a 17% growth which has even generated a comment in some quarters that it is no more Mongolia but "Minegolia". Junior mining company Kincora Copper has announced plans to conduct exploration along strike of the Oyu Tolgoi mine with drilling planned in 2017.

== Gold mining ==
The gold mines of importance are the Zaamar gold mine, the Boroo hard rock gold mine (discovered and extracted since 1979 by open cast mining), Gatsuurt Gold Mine, and tracer gold extraction by the process of dredging the Tuul River. In addition to Copper, Oyu Tolgoi also has large reserves of gold, and the deposit is assessed to contain 14 million ounces of gold in addition to the 19 million tons of copper. This huge ore deposit is stated to be the second largest discovered and valued at US$46 billion at 2003 prices.

== Other minerals ==
Molybdenum has been found at Erdenet-Ovoo and silver found in Asgat and both are under mining. Uranium is found in Dornod and its mining extraction is a joint venture of Russia and Japan. At Dornod, Russia started mining uranium from 1995 but has been discontinued for some time. The Red Book 2011, Mongolia assessed uranium resources at 74,000 tU, although a geological prospecting reports it could go up to 1.47 million tU. Other areas where uranium prospecting has been fruitful are the Mongol-Priargun uranium province and Gurvanbulag apart from Dornod, in the east and northeast of the country in a volcanogenic mineralisation formation. It is also found in the Gobi-Tamsag uranium province in southern Mongolia which are part of sediments in smaller Dulaan Uul and Nars deposits.

In November 2024, Mongolia amended its nuclear energy law to unlock its uranium potential while safeguarding national interests. These changes include a dynamic resource fee structure starting at 5% and climbing to 8% when uranium prices surpass $80 per pound, a ban on foreign radioactive waste imports, and the ability for parliament to replace equity stakes with special payments. The new legislation set the stage for a $1.6 billion uranium development deal with France's Orano Group, which was signed on January 17, 2025.

The revised framework is intended to balance enticing investors while securing long-term returns, addressing previous challenges over resource ownership and environmental safeguards. The project, a joint venture with state-owned Mon-Atom, brings technological expertise and economic benefits while addressing local concerns via compensation mechanisms and plans for domestic processing.

There are now 5-6 known rare earth deposits in Mongolia.

Khalzan Burgetei offers raw material for permanent magnet used in a wide range of applications, from everyday products to life-saving medical devices.

== Illegal mining ==
Many illegal miners in Mongolia are referred to as ninja miners. They get the name from the resemblance the green bowls they carry on their backs (which are used to pan for gold) have to the shells of the Teenage Mutant Ninja Turtles. After the fall of the People's Republic of Mongolia many people became traditional herders. Two harsh winters in the early 2000s resulted in a massive loss in livestock. After this thousands of Mongolians turned to illegal mining on properties abandoned by larger mining companies.

== Supply chain ==
Key procurement categories in the mining industry supply chain include machinery and equipment, vehicles, spare parts, fuel, lubricants, industrial inputs, supply materials, food and catering, and services. Mongolia lacks a competitive advantage in supplying capital inputs locally, as machinery, equipment, industrial inputs, spare parts, vehicles, and fuel are predominantly imported.

Most goods and services procured by mining companies were either imported by local suppliers, rather than domestically sourced, or were supplied directly by foreign economic entities and the contribution of local manufacturers to mining procurement is insignificant in terms of quantity. A 2024 regression analysis shows that the mining sector indirectly drives the non-mineral sector outputs via private and public investment, and total consumption in Mongolia. Mongolian companies provided goods and services that accounted for more than 90% of the mining sector's procurement, and more than one-third of total sales in the industry, on average, between 2016 and 2020.

== Impact ==
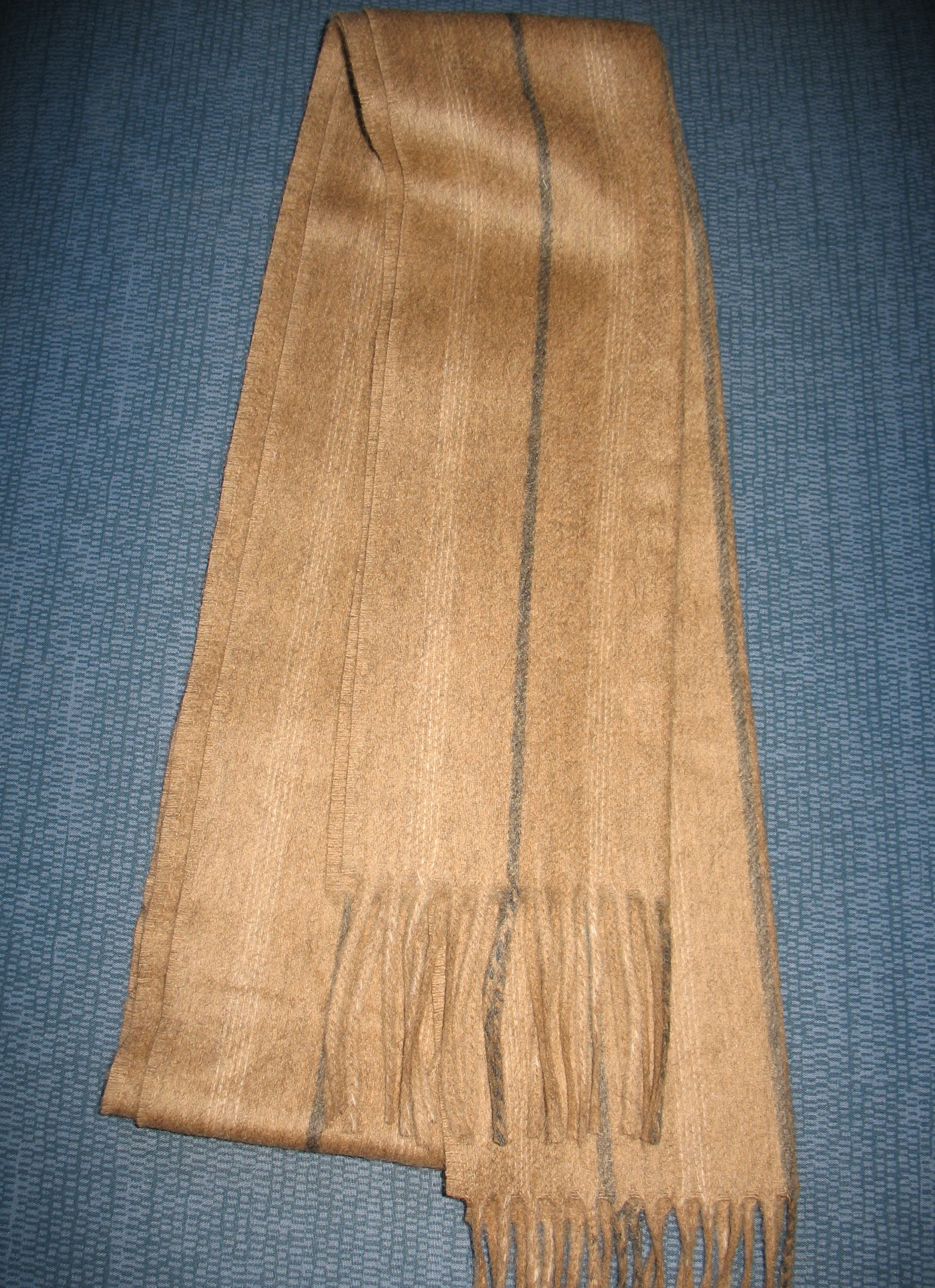
Cashmere wool

The mining activities also have several negative impacts which need timely remedial interventions. The social impacts relate to: A negative feeling that politicians and the rich would exploit the revenue denying benefits to the poor; the resource is non-renewable and could last for another 100 years or so and during this time the traditional livestock herding which sustained the country through its ancient Mongolian cashmere industry (the Gobi Cashmere Company in Ulan Bator is feeling the pinch) should not be allowed to wither away (an example cited in this regard is that of the Netherlands where the Shipbuilding industries went into a tailspin after that country embarked on exploitation of offshore oil; it could turn out to be a "resource curse" as in the case of Nigeria or "Dutch Disease" as in the case of the Netherlands when they found oil to exploit.

It is perceived that in the enthusiasm to mine mineral resources, the government authorities are not paying adequate attention to enforce environmental laws and in monitoring of natural resource base. Some of the issues cited include encroachment of pasture lands for building houses and airport to meet the needs of the mine owners; extraction of the meager water resources (of lakes, water holes and ground water) to meet the large water requirements (requirement for the new copper mines alone is reported to be about 920 liter of water per second during its agreed period of operations) for mining operations affecting the surface and ground water sources (wells are drying up); dirt ridden clouds enveloping the villages, day and night, as the trucks carrying coal and other minerals move on the dirt roads creating health hazards for people as well as to cattle; oft repeated refrain of the people is that there will be "more dust and less water."

=== Economic incentives to people ===
Initially, under the Human and Development Fund generated by mining operations, outright cash was distributed to the people. The future plans drawn by the government envisages coverage of health insurance to people, provided free public housing and free education. Under the Erdenes Tavan Tolgoi (ETT) a state enterprise, every citizen shall get 536 shares as an investment in the mining work.

=== Environmental scandals and mitigation measures ===
Addressing the environmental concerns raised by the people it is now proposed to build permanent tarred roads to avoid dust. Water extraction will be done from fossil aquifers, which will be treated for removing salinity and used for mining operations and not from lakes and water holes. Water shall be recycled and not let out to flow. Special under passages for animals to cross shall be built wherever required.

One human-made disaster related to mining was the Khongor Soum Mercury and Cyanide Contamination which occurred in 2007.

Biologist and environmentalist Lkhagvasumberel Tumursukh (1988-2015) fought against mining operations around the Tost, Tosonbumbi range to protect the environment and preserve the biodiversity. After multiple attacks on his life, T. Lkhagvasümberel was found dead in November 2015.

== Taxation ==
In 2006 Mongolia implemented a 68% windfall tax, which was the world's highest. The tax was based on profits made by mining companies on copper and gold sales above $2,600 per ton and $850 per ounce respectively. The tax was repealed in 2009 and phased out over the next two years.

To boost international competitiveness, the Mongolian government introduced comprehensive amendments to the 2006 minerals law in 2026. The mining royalty structure was altered. The price linked royalty surcharges for copper were reduced by approximately half. Additionally, the law proposed adjustment to local revenue distribution by raising the royal share, retained by local governments from 10% to up to 20%, shifting the allocation from a broad provincial pool to performance weighted formula distributed directly at the district (soum) level.

== Legislation ==
The Minerals Law of 2006 regulates the mining sector in Mongolia. The state owns all mineral resources found on or under the earth's surface, except for water, petroleum, and natural gas. Therefore, according to the law, the state grants exploration and mining rights and licenses. Anyone, Mongolian or foreign, can hold an exploration license, but only legal persons registered in Mongolia can hold a mining license. No one can explore or mine without a valid license. The 2014 Minerals Law amendments specify that a mining license holder shall prioritize taxpayers registered in Mongolia to provide goods, works, or services in compliance with relevant standards and requirements when the license holder procures goods and services and selects subcontractors.

A 2014 quantitative study revealed that the valuations of Mongolia's mining companies are highly sensitive to Mongolian political events and changes in the legal environment.

In May 2026, the Mongolian government introduced comprehensive amendments to the 2006 minerals law, revising roughly 40% of the provisions to curb, speculative trading and mandate environmental, social and governance compliance. The overhaul held the maximum duration of exploration licenses from 12 to 6 years while in increasing holding fees. It also qualified a statutory definition for critical minerals and a separate licensing regime for downstream benefication plants. Furthermore, the 2026 amendments institute mandatory closure plans and financial bonding once a mine reaches 75% of its lifespan.

== See also ==
- Energy in Mongolia
