= Hongor =

Hongor or Khongor (Mongolian: Хонгор, soft or sweetheart, Chinese: 洪戈尔、红格尔) is a frequent compound of toponymics both in Mongolia and in Inner Mongolia, China, for example:

- Khongor, Darkhan-Uul, a sum (district) in northern Mongolia,
  - Khongor Soum Mercury and Cyanide Contamination, an environmental and public health disaster,
- Khan khongor, Ömnögovi, a sum in southern Mongolia,
- Bayankhongor, an aimag (province) in southwest Mongolia,
  - Bayankhongor, the administrative center of Bayankhongor aimag,
- Khongoryn Els, sand dunes in southern Mongolia's Gobi Gurvansaikhan National Park,
- Honggor (Siziwang Banner), a sum in Ulanqab, Inner Mongolia,
- Honggor (Sonid Left Banner), a sum in Xilin Gol aimag, Inner Mongolia.

== Hongort ==
- Hongort, a town (镇) in Chahar Right Back Banner, Ulanqab, Inner Mongolia
