= Saikhan-Ovoo =

Saikhan-Ovoo may refer to:

- Saikhan-Ovoo, Dundgovi, a sum (district) in central Mongolia
- Saikhan-Ovoo, Bulgan, an urban-type settlement or village in northern Mongolia
- Saikhan-Ovoo coal mine, an underground coal mine in northern Mongolia

== See also ==
- Saikhan (disambiguation)
