= Tünkhel, Selenge =

Bag in Mandal, Selenge, Mongolia

Coordinates: 48°38′40″N 106°45′37″E

Tünkhel Түнхэл
- Interactive map of Tünkhel
- Country: Mongolia
- Region: Selenge Province
- District: Mandal

Tünkhel (Mongolian: Түнхэл) is a bag in Mandal District, Selenge Province, Mongolia. Formerly a timber hamlet, Tünkhel experienced a gold rush following the discovery of gold in 1991. Its population expanded from 200 to 3,800 residents in just a few years.

It is 35 km SE from Züünkharaa city or 45 km along the railway. Tünkhel has a station on the Trans-Mongolian Railway. Gatsuurt gold mine is 15 km W from Tünkhel.
