= Sonid =

Sonid may refer to:

- Sonid Left Banner, subdivision of Inner Mongolia, China
- Sonid Right Banner, subdivision of Inner Mongolia, China
