= Eldev Coal Mine =

Coal mine in Dalanjargalan, Dornogovi, Mongolia

Eldev Coal Mine Элдэвийн чулуун нүүрсний уурхай
- Location within Mongolia
- Location: Dalanjargalan, Dornogovi, Mongolia; 46°07′06″N 108°59′35″E
- Products: coal

Eldev Coal Mine (Mongolian: Элдэвийн чулуун нүүрсний уурхай) is a coal mine in Dalanjargalan sum (district) of Dornogovi Province, Mongolia. This mine is 21 km north from sum center (Olon Ovoo railway station of the Trans-Mongolian Railway) and 300 km southeast of Mongolian capital Ulaanbaatar.

Eldev mine is operated by Mongolyn Alt Corporation (MAK) LLC, a mining and processing company of Mongolia. Annual production rate is 0.5 million tonnes (490,000 long tons; 550,000 short tons) of bituminous coal marketed domestically and abroad to China via railroad.

Major customers of the Eldev coal mine in Mongolia:

- Erdenet Mining Corporation
- Khutul Cement & Lime Plant
- Darkhan Metallurgical Plant
- Ulaanbaatar Railway JV, an operator of the Trans-Mongolian Railway
- Darkhan Thermal Power Plant
