= Tsogt =

Tsogt (Mongolian: Цогт, mighty, Tsogtyn in the genitive form for patronymics) is a common part of Mongolian names.

People

- Tsogtyn Batbayar, the mayor of Ulaanbaatar between 2005 and 2007
- Tsogtyn Badamkhatan, an olympic archer from Mongolia
- Tsogt Badamjav, an Architect of Buryat descent (around 1900)
- Tsogt Khun Taij, a noble of the Khalkha-Mongols (1581–1637)

Places

- Several Sums (districts) in different Aimags (provinces) of Mongolia:
  - Tsogt, Govi-Altai
  - Tsogt-Ovoo, Ömnögovi
  - Erdenetsogt, Bayankhongor
  - Delgertsogt, Dundgovi
  - Tsogttsetsii, Ömnögovi
- Bürentsogt Tungsten Mine, a mining location and settlement in eastern Mongolia

Other

- Tsogt Taij (film), a Mongolian movie about Tsogt Khun Taij
