= Tumurtolgoi Iron Ore Mine =

Coal mine in Khongor, Darkhan-Uul, Mongolia

Tumurtolgoi Iron Ore Mine Төмөртолгой уурхай
- Location within Mongolia
- Location: Khongor, Darkhan-Uul, Mongolia; 49°18′24.8″N 106°10′52.7″E
- Products: iron ore
- Company: Darkhan Metallurgical Plant

The Tumurtolgoi Iron Ore Mine (Mongolian: Төмөртолгой уурхай) is an iron ore mine in Khongor District, Darkhan-Uul Province, Mongolia.

== History ==
The mine area was studied and explored in 1960. The exploration license was owned by Kharmurun-Mongol, which was then later converted into mining license. The license was later on suspended by the Mineral Resources and Oil Authority and transferred it to Darkhan Metallurgical Plant, which owned the mine in 2005.

== Business ==
The mine is owned by Darkhan Metallurgical Plant. The ore is mined and used for the plant, which is located in the nearby Darkhan City.

== See also ==
- Mining in Mongolia
