= Saikhan =

Saikhan may refer to:

- Saikhan, Bulgan, a sum (district) of Bulgan Province in northern Mongolia
- Saikhan, Selenge, a sum (district) of Selenge Province in northern Mongolia

== See also ==
- Saikhan-Ovoo (disambiguation)
