= Tsagaan Suvarga mine =

Mine in Mandakh, Dornogovi, Mongolia

- Location within Mongolia
- Location: Mandakh sum, Dornogovi, Mongolia; 43°51′40″N 108°20′10″E
- Products: Copper
- Company: Mongolyn Alt Corporation

The Tsagaan Suvarga mine (Mongolian: цагаан суварга, white stupa) is a copper ore deposit and mine in development located in the Mandakh sum of Dornogovi aimag in the south of Mongolia.

The deposit is estimated at reserves of 240.1 million tonnes of ore grading 0.53% copper. It is included in the Mongolian governments list of strategic important deposits.

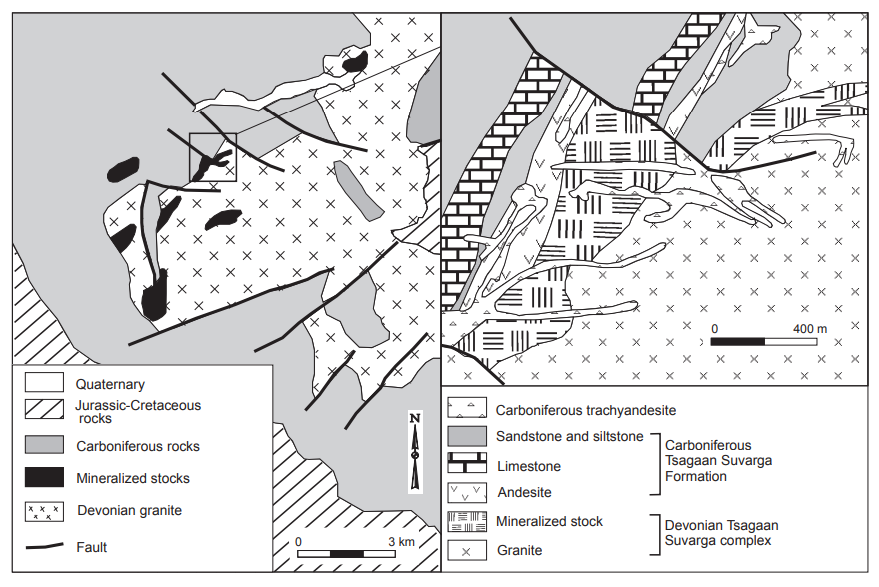
Tsagaab Suvarga copper molybdenum porphryr geological maps

The geology consists of quartz veins, including chalcopyrite and molybdenite, within the Late Devonian Tsagaan-Suavarga granosyenite and granodiorite porphyry. All of which is overlain by Carboniferous volcanic and sedimentary rock.
