= Tumurtei-Khandgait mine railroad =

Coordinates: 48.11621°N 106.91484°E

Tumurtei mine railroad
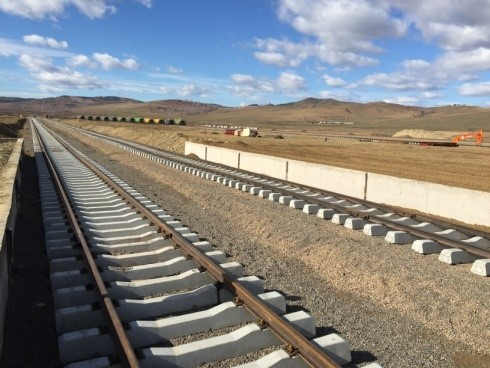
- Tumurtei mine railroad

Technical
- Track gauge: 1,520 mm (4 ft 11 27/32 in)

The Tumurtei-Khandgait mine railroad is a 33.4 kilometres (20.8 mi) long broad gauge railway line with a gauge of 1,520 mm (4 ft 11 27/32 in) for the transport of iron ore in the area of Darchan-Selenge in Mongolia.

== History ==
The railway line was built in 2015–2016 with three loading and unloading terminals and railway stations. The signal systems and level crossings are equipped with the latest technology. The track was financed by the mining company QSC under a concession agreement. It was built by "Mongolian Railway Corporation" LLC with main sub contractor the Mongolian “Peak Development” LLC in collaboration with the Mongolian “Khutul Ceramzit” LLC, “Maximal” LLC and “Ulaanbaatar Railway” JSC. It was handed over to the Mongolian State Railways AG (MTZ), including a loading and unloading facility, following a government decision published on 1 February 2016. It is used to transport iron ore from the Tumurtei mine to a new steel and iron smelter, which is being built near the Darkhan Metallurgical Plant. On 3 April 2016, the railway line was officially opened by Speaker of the Parliament Zandaakhüügiin Enkhbold. The MTZ planned to transport one million tonnes of iron ore in 2016 and plans to increase its transport volume to eight to ten million tonnes in the future.
