= Kherkh, Selenge =

Bag in Mandal, Selenge, Mongolia

Coordinates: 48°48′47″N 106°30′09″E

Kherkh (Mongolian: Хэрх) is a bag in the Mandal district of Selenge Province, Mongolia. It is five kilometres (3.1 mi) south of Züünkharaa city center, separated by the Kharaa Gol (Mandal Gol) river. Kherkh has a bridge and paved road connection to the city.
