= Khushuut coal mine =

Coal mine in Khovd, Mongolia

Khushuut Coal Mine
- Location within Mongolia
- Location: Darvi sum, Khovd, Mongolia; 46°48′12″N 93°18′20″E
- Products: Coking coal

The Khushuut Coal Mine (Mongolian: Хөшөөт) is a coal mine located in the Darvi sum in the Khovd aimag of western Mongolia.

The mine has coal reserves amounting to 460 million tonnes of coking coal, one of the largest coal reserves in Asia and the world. The mine has an annual production capacity of 3 million tonnes of coal.
