= Aduunchuluun coal mine =

Mine in Choibalsa, Dornod, Mongolia

Aduunchuluun Coal Mine
- Location within Mongolia
- Location: Choibalsan (city), Dornod, Mongolia; 48°07′30″N 114°32′15″E
- Products: Coking coal
- Company: Mongolyn Alt Corporation (MAK)

The Aduunchuluun Coal Mine, also written as "Aduun Chuluun" coal mine (Mongolian: Адуун чулуун, horses' rock) is a coal mine located next to Choibalsan city in Dornod aimag of eastern Mongolia. The mine has coal reserves amounting to 423.8 million tonnes (417,100,000 long tons; 467,200,000 short tons) of coking coal, one of the largest coal reserves in Asia and the world. The mine has an annual production capacity of 0.6 million tonnes of coal. Owner is the Mongolyn Alt Corporation (MAK).

== History ==
The mine was discovered in 1951–1952. Several studies were then conducted to the mine, such as hydrogeological studies in 1965 and 1981 and geological study in 1975. Geological exploration was carried out in 1988–1989 to determine the mine's borders.
