= Mineral Resources and Petroleum Authority =

Government agency of Mongolia

- Ашигт Mалтмал, Газрын Tосны Газар (Mongolian)
- MRAM logo

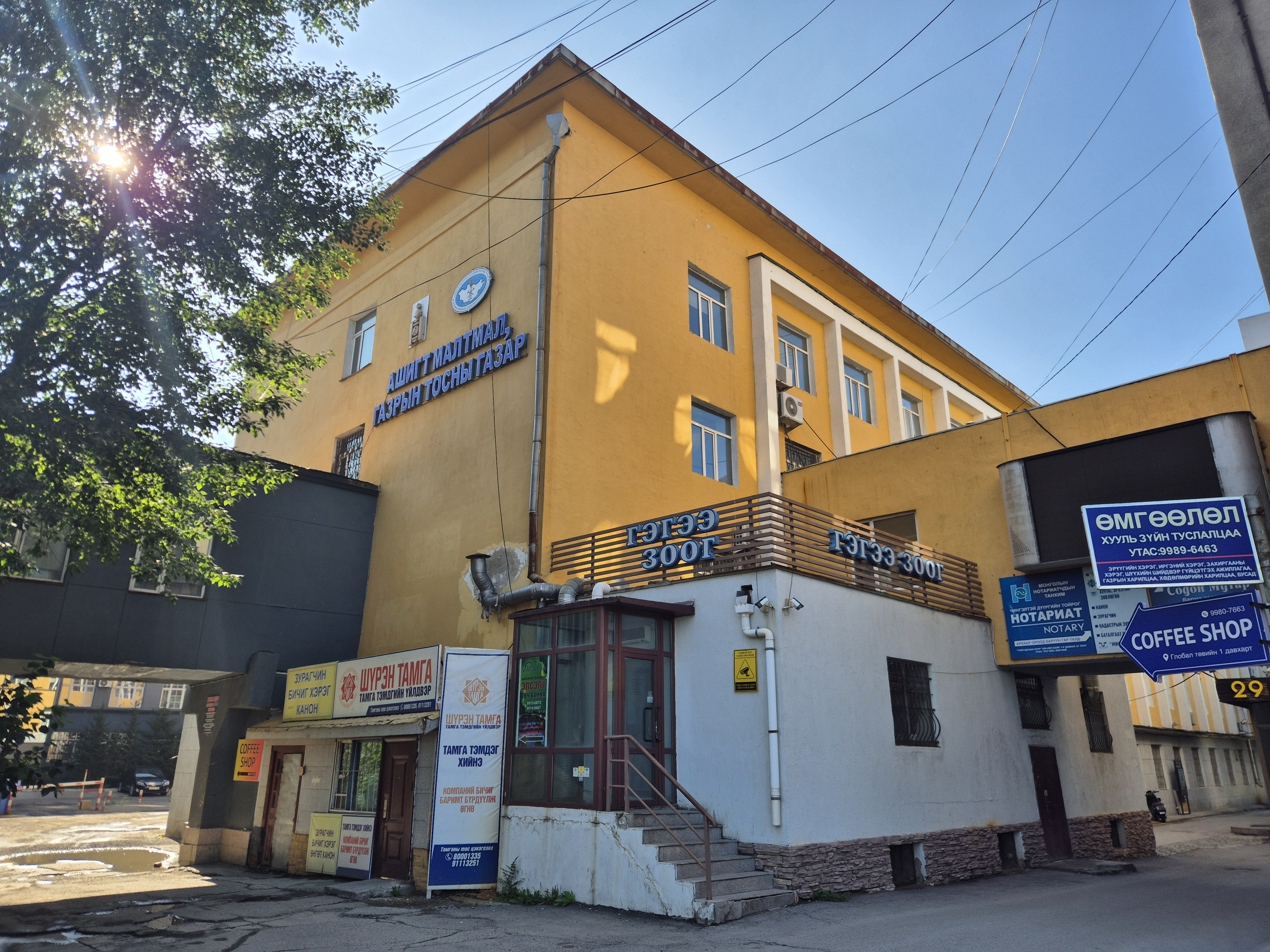

Agency overview
- Type: Implementing Agency
- Headquarters: Chingeltei, Ulaanbaatar
- Employees: 145
- Agency executive: D.Uuriintuya, General Director
- Parent department: Ministry of Mining and Heavy Industry of Mongolia

The Mineral Resources and Petroleum Authority (MRPAM; Mongolian: Ашигт Mалтмал, Газрын Tосны Газар) is an agency of the Government of Mongolia which is responsible for the mining and mineral industry of Mongolia. The mining industry accounts for 89% of Mongolia's exports and over 20% of the country's gross domestic product.

Its purpose is to support the administration of the mineral resources in formulating development policies, provide required information and create a favorable environment in implementing policy guidelines and increasing investment in the Mongolian mining sector. MRAM provides services related to exploration and mining licenses in order to implement the governing Minerals Law. MRAM works in concert with other government agencies with all environmental matters related to mining.
