= Mogoin Gol Coal Mine =

Coal mine in Tsetserleg, Khövsgöl, Mongolia

Mogoingol Coal Mine
- Location within Mongolia
- Location: Tsetserleg, Khövsgöl, Mongolia; 49°21′28.1″N 97°49′44.5″E
- Products: coal
- Production: 25,000 tons (annually)
- Opened: 1971
- Company: Mogoin Gol JSC

The Mogoingol Coal Mine is a coal mine in Tsetserleg, Khövsgöl Province, Mongolia.

== History ==
The mine was discovered during exploration held in 1967–1970. The mining operation started in 1971 with the establishment of Mogoin Gol JSC company. In 1992, the area was further explored which resulted in the discovery of new coal reserve.

== Geology ==
The mine spans over an area of 6.6 km^{2}. As of 2017, the mine as an extimated reserve of 12 million tons, in which around 2 million tons have been mined so far.

== Business ==
The mine is owned by Mogoin Gol JSC, which was founded in 1971. The company exports the coal extracted from the mine to China. The coal is transported from the mine to Erdenet in Orkhon Province by trucks and to China by railway.

== See also ==
- Mining in Mongolia
