= Salkhit =

Bag in Khongor, Darkhan-Uul, Mongolia

Coordinates: 49°12′00″N 105°52′12″E

Salkhit (Mongolian: Салхит, ᠰᠠᠯᠬᠢᠲᠦ, "windy") is a bag in Khongor sum (district) of Darkhan-Uul Province, Mongolia.

== Geography ==
Salkhit is located on the Kharaa gol river (a right tributary of the Orkhon river), 13 km south of the center of the sum of Khongor, and 33 km south of the aimag capital Darkhan.

== Economy ==
Salkhit is the railway station where the 164 km long Salkhit–Erdenet line starts. This line was built to the copper producing city of Erdenet in 1975, with Soviet assistance.

== Prehistory ==
An Homo sapiens skullcap with archaic features similar to those of Neanderthals and Homo erectus was found near Salkhit in 2006 during gold mining operations at depth 5–6 m. Original estimates dated the skullcap to about 22,100 years old, but later re-dating in 2010 indicated 23,630 BP.

In 2019, the Salkhit skull was again radiocarbon dated, analyzing hydroxyproline in bone-extracted collagen, placing it in the range 34,950–33,900 cal BP. Despite its archaic features, genetic reconstruction of ancient DNA from the skull indicates the specimen falls on a novel branch of mtDNA haplogroup N, one of two basal haplogroups ancestral to all non-African populations. Application of a molecular clock to the mtDNA sequence yielded a date for the skull of 12,910 to 39,410 years BP. The Salkhit individual was found to have carried c. 74–78% 'Basal East Asian' Tianyuan-like ancestry and c. 22–26% Early West Eurasian Kostenki14-like ancestry. The Salkhit individual displayed a complex relationship to Ancient North Eurasians.
