= Khongor Soum Mercury and Cyanide Contamination =

Environmental and Public Health Disaster

Khongor Soum Mercury and Cyanide Contamination is an environmental and public health crisis that occurred in Darkhan-Uul Province, Mongolia in 2007.

Khongor is a soum (district) in Darkhan-Uul Province, Mongolia, with a population of approximately 2,300 residents at the time the contamination came to public attention. The soum became the site of what officials described as the country's first major chemical accident, following unlicensed artisanal and small-scale gold mining operations that used mercury and cyanide to process gold ore and processing waste ("slime"). Contamination of soil, groundwater, drinking-water wells, air, and at least one school building was subsequently documented by Mongolian government agencies and reportedly assessed by World Health Organization (WHO) analysts.

Local citizens' representatives and the Mongolian National Green Movement, have alleged that government and WHO officials in Mongolia concealed the full extent of a WHO assessment of soil toxicity in the soum. According to these representatives, residents have experienced elevated rates of stillbirths, skin diseases, and other unexplained health complaints that they attribute to the contamination, and they hold the pollution responsible for the deaths of 60 people, numerous miscarriages, and heightened cancer risk across age groups.

== Background ==
Illegal processing of gold ore and mine slime using mercury and cyanide reportedly took place in and around Khongor soum. Mercury is used in artisanal gold mining to amalgamate fine gold particles, while cyanide is used to leach gold from crushed ore; both chemicals are highly toxic and, if improperly contained, readily contaminate soil, water, and air. Similar mercury contamination has previously been documented in other Mongolian mining areas, including Bornuur and Zaamar soums, which the World Health Organisation (WHO) cited as points of comparison when assessing Khongor.

A Chinese-owned mining company was allegedly using chemicals in the area. The Chinese company declined to sign a joint appeal, backed by all other participants, calling on the President and the Speaker of the Mongolian Parliament to provide immediate humanitarian assistance to the residents of Khongor soum, halt artisanal gold mining, and have Mongolia join the international convention against environmental crimes.

== WHO Findings and Allegations of a Cover-Up ==
Citizens' representatives from Khongor soum stated that officials withheld a WHO report on the extent of soil toxicity in the area, where chemicals including cyanide were detected. In August 2007, a meeting with civil representatives, WHO analysts reportedly told residents that Khongor was not "as" contaminated with mercury as Bornuur and Zaamar, but confirmed the presence of arsenic, cadmium, and mercury in soil samples at levels ranging from 0.5 to 24.5 times the tolerable limit. The analysts said they had recommended action to reduce toxicity levels and protect residents. Separately, Mongolian government monitoring reported far higher exceedances in specific media prior to the government-led neutralization effort: cyanide ion concentrations in drinking water were measured at 13 to 65 times the permissible level, cyanide in wastewater at 2.6 to 3,700 times the permissible level, and airborne mercury at 6 to 121 times the permissible level. Government officials have attributed some public perception of the severity of contamination to errors made by local authorities in sampling and analysis during their own monitoring efforts.

On the contrary to WHO findings, another team of the UN Environment/OCHA Joint Unit found out that the Khongor soum's soil, ground water, drinking water supplies and the wastewater treatment plant were contaminated with mercury and sodium cyanide in July 2007.

== Health Impacts ==
Citizens' representatives link the soum's abnormal rates of stillbirths, skin diseases, and other unexplained complaints to soil and water toxicity, and attribute 60 deaths, multiple miscarriages, and elevated cancer risk (affecting residents from infants to the elderly) to the contamination. Ministry of Environment and Tourism officials have separately noted the birth of calves and foals with deformities and genetic abnormalities in the soum, which they cite as evidence that mercury contamination began well before it was publicly identified — reasoning that, given a roughly 276-day (nine-month) gestation period for cattle, affected parent animals would have already been contaminated at the time of conception. Ministry specialists have noted that mercury's principal toxicological effects are on the nervous system and genetic material, and that roughly half of a given dose of mercury is eliminated from the body within 60 days, a period that can extend up to a year in cases of chronic, long-term exposure.

As of 2014, more than half of the population has left Khongor due to the side-effects of the contamination.

== Government Response ==
Joint State Inspection and Resolution Following the disaster, the Mongolian government ordered a joint state inspection, involving five ministries and agencies, of business operations using chemical substances. The government subsequently reviewed the resulting report and adopted a resolution assigning responsibilities to relevant institutions, including building stockpiles of medicines to treat mercury poisoning, enrolling affected residents in medical testing and treatment, building stockpiles of neutralizing agents and solutions, decontaminating accumulated mercury- and cyanide-contaminated waste, and remediating contaminated soil and water. Decontamination Operation A working group under the National Council for Toxic and Hazardous Chemicals, operating under the Office of the Prime Minister, organized a decontamination and neutralization operation in Khongor soum. The operation transported 1,192 tonnes of mercury- and cyanide-contaminated ore and processing slime to the tailings pond of Boroo Gold LLC, and decontaminated 44,790 square meters of contaminated land, a school computer room, sedimentation basins and sludge ponds at a wastewater treatment facility, wells, a 560-square-meter filtration area, and a 900-meter wastewater channel. Drinking-water wells were pumped out, and 18.5 tonnes of cyanide working solution were neutralized and destroyed. Because the site had combined mercury and cyanide contamination, the working group used a substance called DTOX (sodium polysulfide), which breaks down cyanide and converts mercury into a non-volatile, less-toxic sulfide (mineral) form. DTOX was sourced from Altlabs Asia LLC, a Canadian-invested company, as Mongolia had no prior domestic stockpile of decontamination materials or equipment for an incident of this scale. On-site cyanide testing was conducted throughout the operation, with repeat neutralization performed wherever contamination was detected; mercury levels were assessed via air samples sent to Ulaanbaatar for laboratory analysis. Officials stated that limited material stockpiles, combined with the discovery of previously unidentified contaminated sites during the operation, meant that neutralization efforts were concentrated on the most heavily contaminated points rather than covering the soum's entire area. A follow-up working group from the National Council was scheduled to travel to Khongor on September 2 to collect monitoring samples, assess the degree of remaining contamination, and issue further recommendations. Officials quoted in connection with the operation include Banzragch, Director of the Environment and Natural Resources Department at the Ministry of Environment and Tourism, and Jargalsaikhan, a specialist at the Ministry's Toxic Chemicals Analysis Center.

Citizens' representatives from Khongor soum have called for:

- Invalidation of court decisions related to the soum that they characterize as illegal
- Relocation of the soum's residents to safe areas with access to clean water
- Proper medical care for all residents affected by the contamination

During discussions among stakeholders, a Chinese mining company operating in the area declined to sign a joint appeal — otherwise supported by all other participants — addressed to the President and the Speaker of the Mongolian Parliament. The appeal called for immediate humanitarian assistance to Khongor soum residents, an end to artisanal gold mining, and Mongolia's accession to an international convention against environmental crimes.

The Prime Minister Sanjiin Bayar initially did not acknowledge the disaster, however, he later made public apology for his administration's mishandling and irresponsible behavior.

In 2008, three Chinese citizens, who were affiliated with the mining company, were sentenced to serve 6-year prison time.

== See also ==
- Environmental issues in Mongolia
- Mining in Mongolia
- Ninja miner
