= Sonid Left Banner =

Sonid Left Banner 苏尼特左旗 • ᠰᠥᠨᠡᠳ ᠵᠡᠭᠦᠨ ᠬᠣᠰᠢᠭᠤ
- Banner
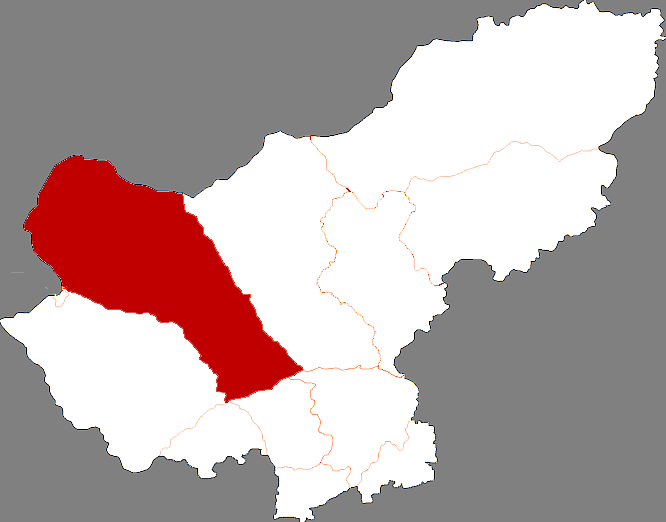
- Sonid Left Banner in Xilin Gol

- Xilin Gol in Inner Mongolia

- Location of the seat in Inner Mongolia Sonid Left (China)
- Coordinates: 43°51′36″N 113°40′01″E
- Country: China
- Autonomous region: Inner Mongolia
- League: Xilin Gol
- Banner seat: Mandalt

Area
  - Total: 34,250 km^{2} (13,220 sq mi)

Population (2020)
  - Total: 33,643
  - Density: 0.9823/km^{2} (2.544/sq mi)
- Time zone: UTC+8 (China Standard)
- Website: www.sntzq.gov.cn

Sonid Left Banner

Chinese name
- Simplified Chinese: 苏尼特左旗
- Traditional Chinese: 蘇尼特左旗
Transcriptions
Standard Mandarin
- Hanyu Pinyin: Sūnítè Zuǒqí

Mongolian name
- Mongolian Cyrillic: Сөнөд зүүн хошуу
- Mongolian script: ᠰᠥᠨᠡᠳ ᠵᠡᠭᠦᠨ ᠬᠣᠰᠢᠭᠤ
Transcriptions
- SASM/GNC: Söned Jegün qosiɣu

Sonid Left Banner (Mongolian: ᠰᠥᠨᠡᠳ ᠵᠡᠭᠦᠨ ᠬᠣᠰᠢᠭᠤ; Chinese: 苏尼特左旗) is a banner of north-central Inner Mongolia, China, bordering the Mongolian provinces of Dornogovi to the west and Sükhbaatar to the north. It is under the administration of Xilingol League. Sunud Mongols live here.

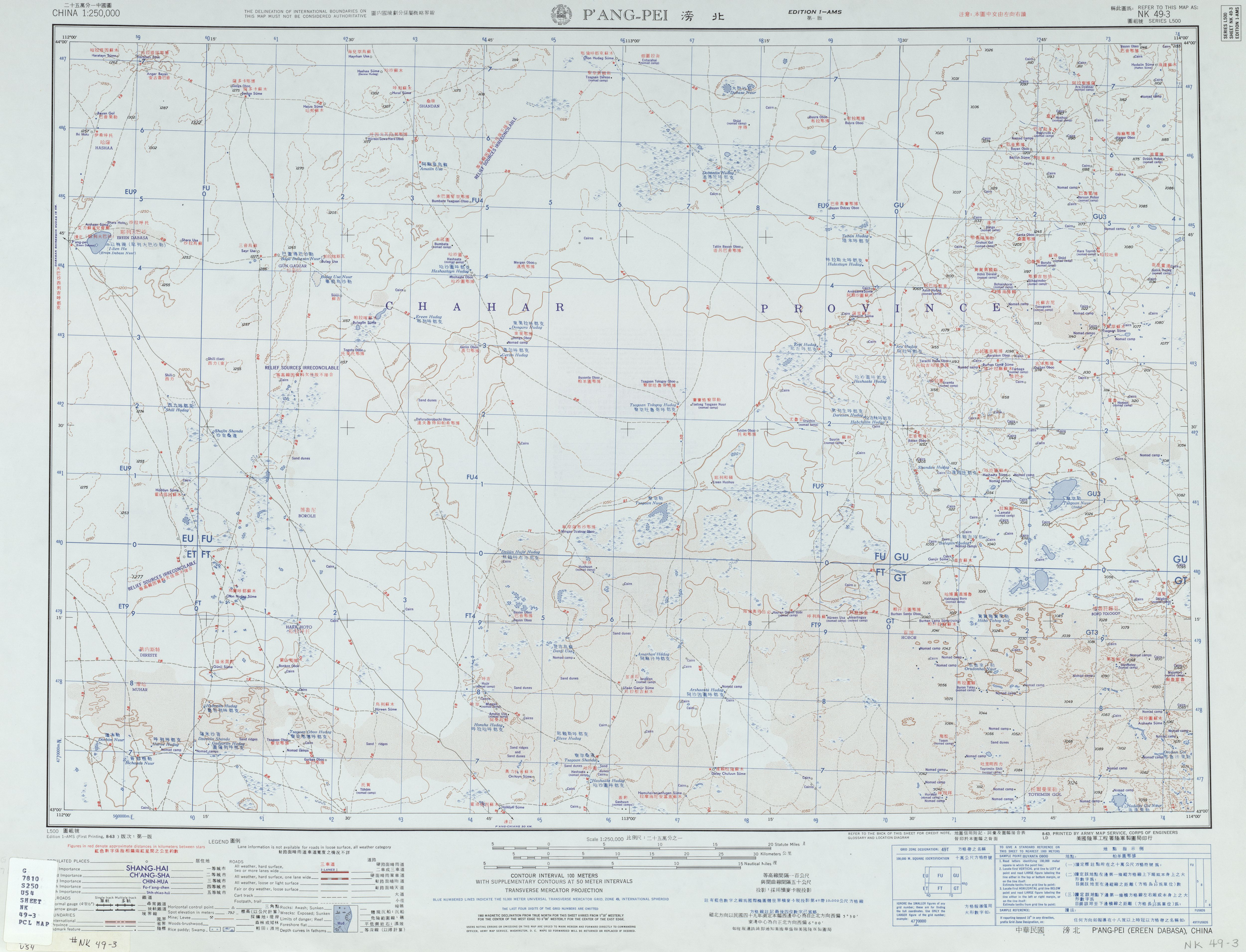
Map including modern-day Sonid Left Banner area (AMS, 1963)

== Demographics ==
The proportion of nationalities in Sonid Left Banner (2020)
Nationality	Percentage
Mongols	59.7%
Han	39.3%
Manchus	0.4%
Hui People	0.2%
Yi People	0.1%
Daur	0.1%
Others	0.2%
Source of the population statistics :

== Administrative divisions ==
Sonid Left Banner is divided into 3 towns and 4 sums.

Name	Simplified Chinese	Hanyu Pinyin	Mongolian (Hudum Script)	Mongolian (Cyrillic)	Administrative division code
Towns
Mandalt Town	满都拉图镇	Mǎndūlātú Zhèn	ᠮᠠᠨᠳᠠᠯᠲᠤ ᠪᠠᠯᠭᠠᠰᠤ	Мандалт балгас	152523100
Qagan Obo Town	查干敖包镇	Chágàn'áobāo Zhèn	ᠴᠠᠭᠠᠨᠣ᠋ᠪᠣᠭ᠎ᠠ ᠪᠠᠯᠭᠠᠰᠤ	Цагаан-Овоо балгас	152523101
Bayan Nur Town	巴彦淖尔镇	Bāyànnào'ěr Zhèn	ᠪᠠᠶᠠᠨᠨᠠᠭᠤᠷ ᠪᠠᠯᠭᠠᠰᠤ	Баяннуур балгас	152523102
Sums
Bayan Ul Sum	巴彦乌拉苏木	Bāyànwūlā Sūmù	ᠪᠠᠶᠠᠨ᠌ᠠ᠋ᠭᠤᠯᠠ ᠰᠤᠮᠤ	Баян-Уул сум	152523200
Saihan Gobi Sum	赛罕高毕苏木	Sàihǎngāobì Sūmù	ᠰᠠᠢᠬᠠᠨᠭᠣᠪᠢ ᠰᠤᠮᠤ	Сайханговь сум	152523201
Honggor Sum	洪格尔苏木	Hónggé'ěr Sūmù	ᠬᠣᠩᠭᠣᠷ ᠰᠤᠮᠤ	Хонгор сум	152523202
Dalai Sum	达来苏木	Dálái Sūmù	ᠳᠠᠯᠠᠢ ᠰᠤᠮᠤ	Далай сум	152523203

Others:

- Sonid Left Banner Manglai Circular Economy Industrial Park (苏尼特左旗芒来循环经济产业园区)
- Engger Gol Irrigation Area (恩格尔河灌区)

== Climate ==
Sonid Left Banner features a cold arid climate (Köppen BWk), marked by long, cold and very dry winters, hot, somewhat humid summers, and strong winds, especially in spring. The monthly 24-hour mean temperature in January, the coldest month, is −18.7 °C (−1.7 °F), and in July, the warmest month, 22.0 °C (71.6 °F), with the annual mean at 3.07 °C (37.5 °F). The annual precipitation is 185 millimetres (7.28 in), with more than half of it falling in July and August alone.

Climate data for Sonid Left Banner, elevation 1,037 m (3,402 ft), (1991–2020 normals, extremes 1971–2010)
Month	Jan	Feb	Mar	Apr	May	Jun	Jul	Aug	Sep	Oct	Nov	Dec	Year
Record high °C (°F)	6.9 (44.4)	10.8 (51.4)	18.4 (65.1)	31.5 (88.7)	33.8 (92.8)	38.5 (101.3)	41.5 (106.7)	38.2 (100.8)	35.6 (96.1)	27.2 (81.0)	18.9 (66.0)	6.8 (44.2)	41.5 (106.7)
Mean daily maximum °C (°F)	−12.4 (9.7)	−6.1 (21.0)	3.9 (39.0)	14.1 (57.4)	21.7 (71.1)	26.9 (80.4)	29.6 (85.3)	27.7 (81.9)	21.5 (70.7)	11.9 (53.4)	0.0 (32.0)	−10.0 (14.0)	10.7 (51.3)
Daily mean °C (°F)	−18.7 (−1.7)	−13.4 (7.9)	−3.4 (25.9)	6.7 (44.1)	14.6 (58.3)	20.6 (69.1)	23.5 (74.3)	21.5 (70.7)	14.8 (58.6)	4.9 (40.8)	−6.4 (20.5)	−15.9 (3.4)	4.1 (39.3)
Mean daily minimum °C (°F)	−23.7 (−10.7)	−19.2 (−2.6)	−9.7 (14.5)	−0.2 (31.6)	7.5 (45.5)	14.1 (57.4)	17.5 (63.5)	15.4 (59.7)	8.6 (47.5)	−0.7 (30.7)	−11.4 (11.5)	−20.8 (−5.4)	−1.9 (28.6)
Record low °C (°F)	−35.5 (−31.9)	−33.5 (−28.3)	−26.3 (−15.3)	−19.0 (−2.2)	−9.4 (15.1)	1.0 (33.8)	7.3 (45.1)	1.0 (33.8)	−5.3 (22.5)	−18.2 (−0.8)	−29.3 (−20.7)	−34.3 (−29.7)	−35.5 (−31.9)
Average precipitation mm (inches)	1.4 (0.06)	1.7 (0.07)	3.6 (0.14)	7.8 (0.31)	17.5 (0.69)	32.0 (1.26)	43.7 (1.72)	38.2 (1.50)	18.6 (0.73)	9.6 (0.38)	3.9 (0.15)	2.2 (0.09)	180.2 (7.1)
Average precipitation days (≥ 0.1 mm)	3.2	2.5	3.7	3.0	5.1	8.1	9.4	7.5	5.9	3.6	3.9	4.1	60
Average snowy days	6.0	4.8	4.7	2.5	0.7	0	0	0	0.2	2.1	5.8	7.0	33.8
Average relative humidity (%)	69	62	45	32	34	42	48	49	45	47	58	68	50
Mean monthly sunshine hours	217.7	229.0	277.4	284.0	300.1	294.3	299.3	296.8	272.3	248.8	209.0	198.7	3,127.4
Percentage possible sunshine	75	77	74	70	65	64	65	69	74	74	73	72	71
Source 1: China Meteorological Administration
Source 2: Weather China

== See also ==
- Sunud
