= Mörön, Khentii =

District in Khentii Province, Mongolia

Coordinates: 47°22′54″N 110°19′01″E

Mörön District Мөрөн сум ᠮᠥᠷᠡᠨᠰᠤᠮᠤ
- District
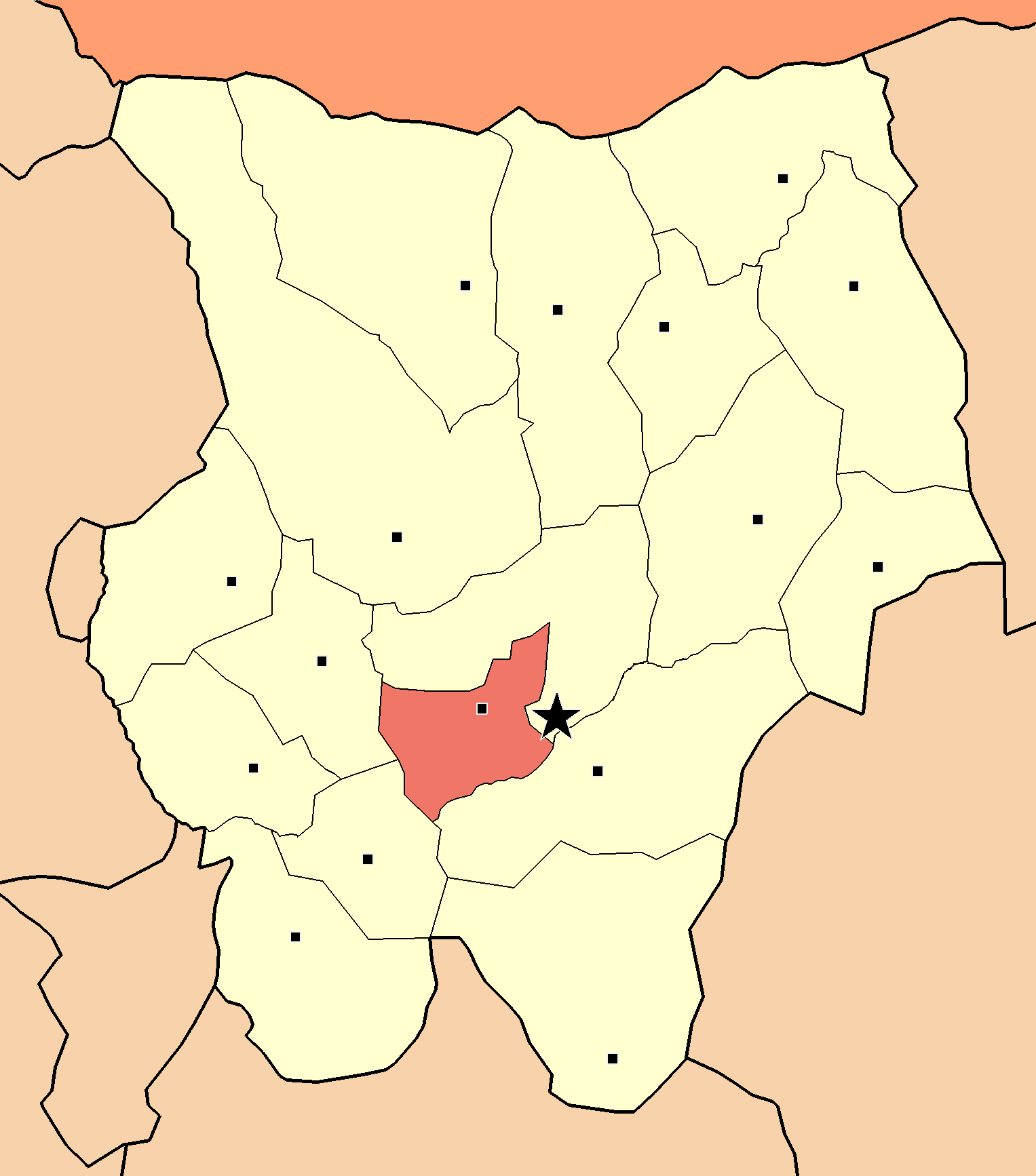
- Location of Mörön in Khentii Province
- Country: Mongolia
- Province: Khentii Province

Area
  - Total: 2,196 km^{2} (848 sq mi)
- Time zone: UTC+8 (UTC + 8)

Mörön (Mongolian: Мөрөн) is a sum (district) of Khentii Province in eastern Mongolia. The Chandgana Tal coal mine is 25 km east of Mörön sum center. In 2010, its population was 1,326.

== Geography ==
Mörön is the smallest district in the province.

== Administrative divisions ==
The district is divided into five bags, which are:

- Bureet
- Chandgan
- Tsagaan tolgoi
- Ulziit
- Zuulun
