= Erds coal mine =

Coal mine in Mongolia

Erds Coal Mine
- Location: Mongolia
- Products: Coking coal

The Erds Coal Mine is a coal mine located in eastern Mongolia. The mine has coal reserves amounting to 807 million tonnes of coking coal, one of the largest coal reserves in Asia and the world. The mine has an annual production capacity of 0.1 million tonnes of coal.
