= Tavt mine =

Mine in Teshig, Bulgan, Mongolia

- Location within Mongolia
- Location: Teshig sum, Bulgan, Mongolia; 50°07′N 102°28′E
- Products: Gold
- Company: AFK-Tavt LLC

The Tavt mine (Mongolian: Тавт) is a gold mines in Teshig sum of Bulgan Province, Mongolia.

The mine consists of strips that have gold-silver-copper ingredient. The reserves are estimated to a total of about 7.2 t of Gold and more than 25 t of silver. The yearly capacity is about 350 kg of gold.
