= Tüvshrüülekh =

District in Arkhangai Province, Mongolia

Coordinates: 47°22′54″N 101°54′37″E

Tüvshrüülekh District Түвшрүүлэх сум ᠲᠦᠪᠰᠢᠷᠡᠭᠦᠯᠬᠦᠰᠤᠮᠤ
- District
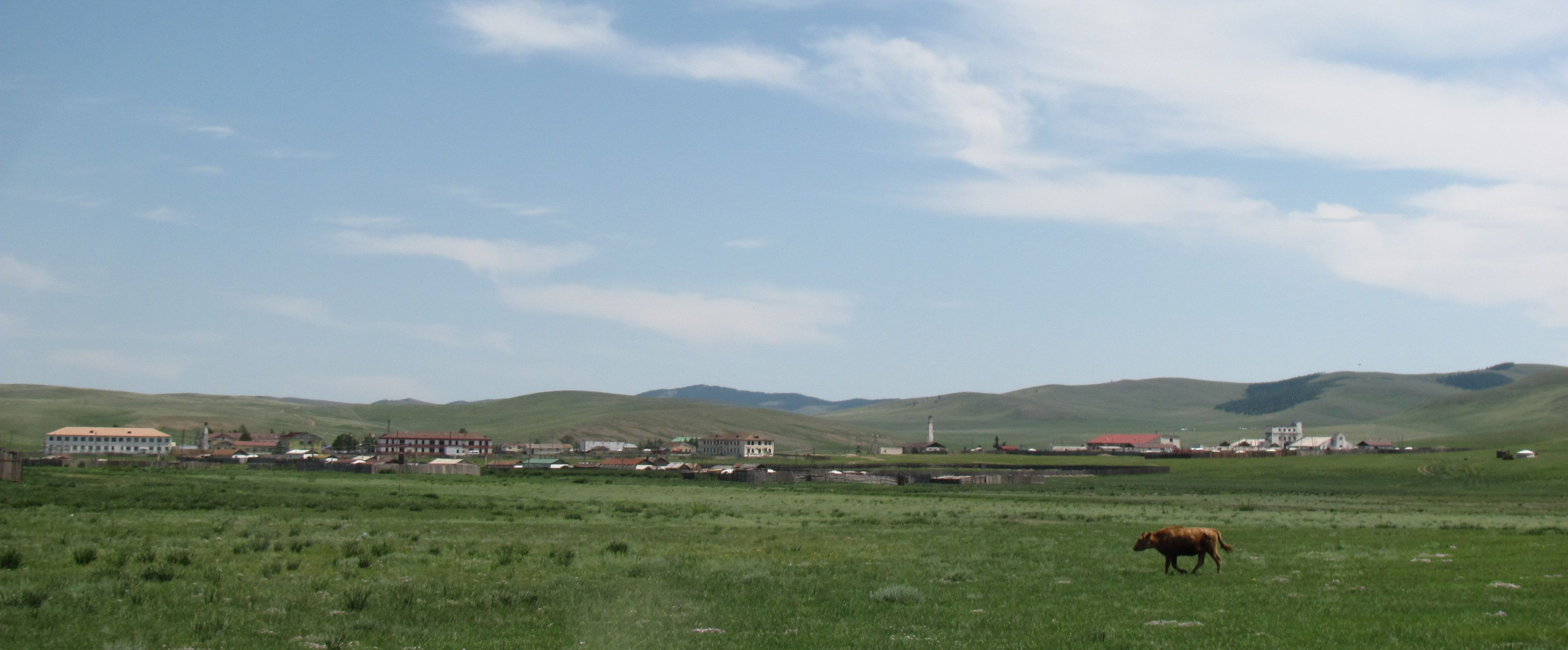

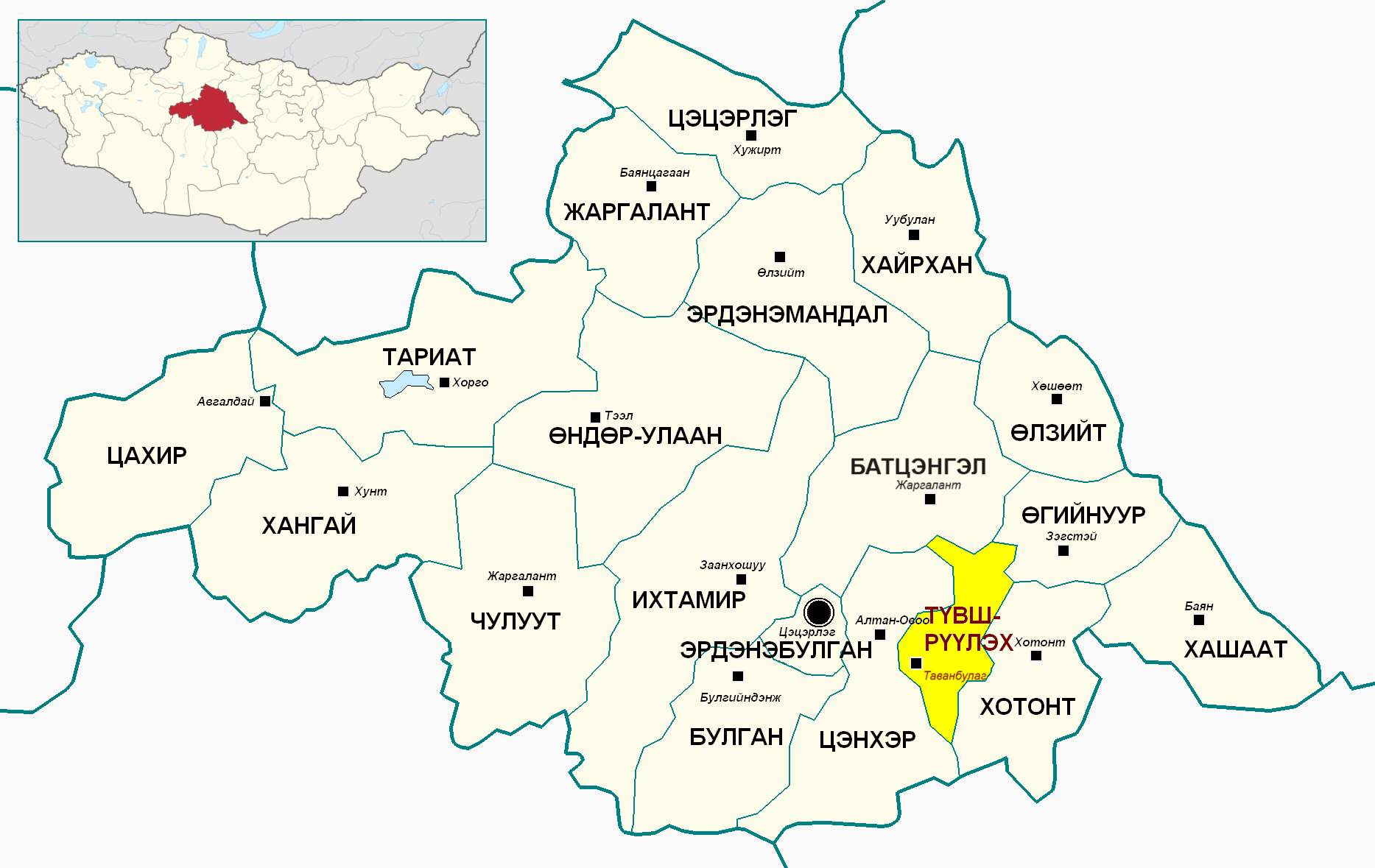
- Tüvshrüülekh District in Arkhangai Province
- Country: Mongolia
- Province: Arkhangai Province

Area
  - Total: 1,200 km^{2} (460 sq mi)
- Time zone: UTC+8 (UTC + 8)

Tüvshrüülekh (Mongolian: Түвшрүүлэх) is a sum (district) of Arkhangai Province in central Mongolia.

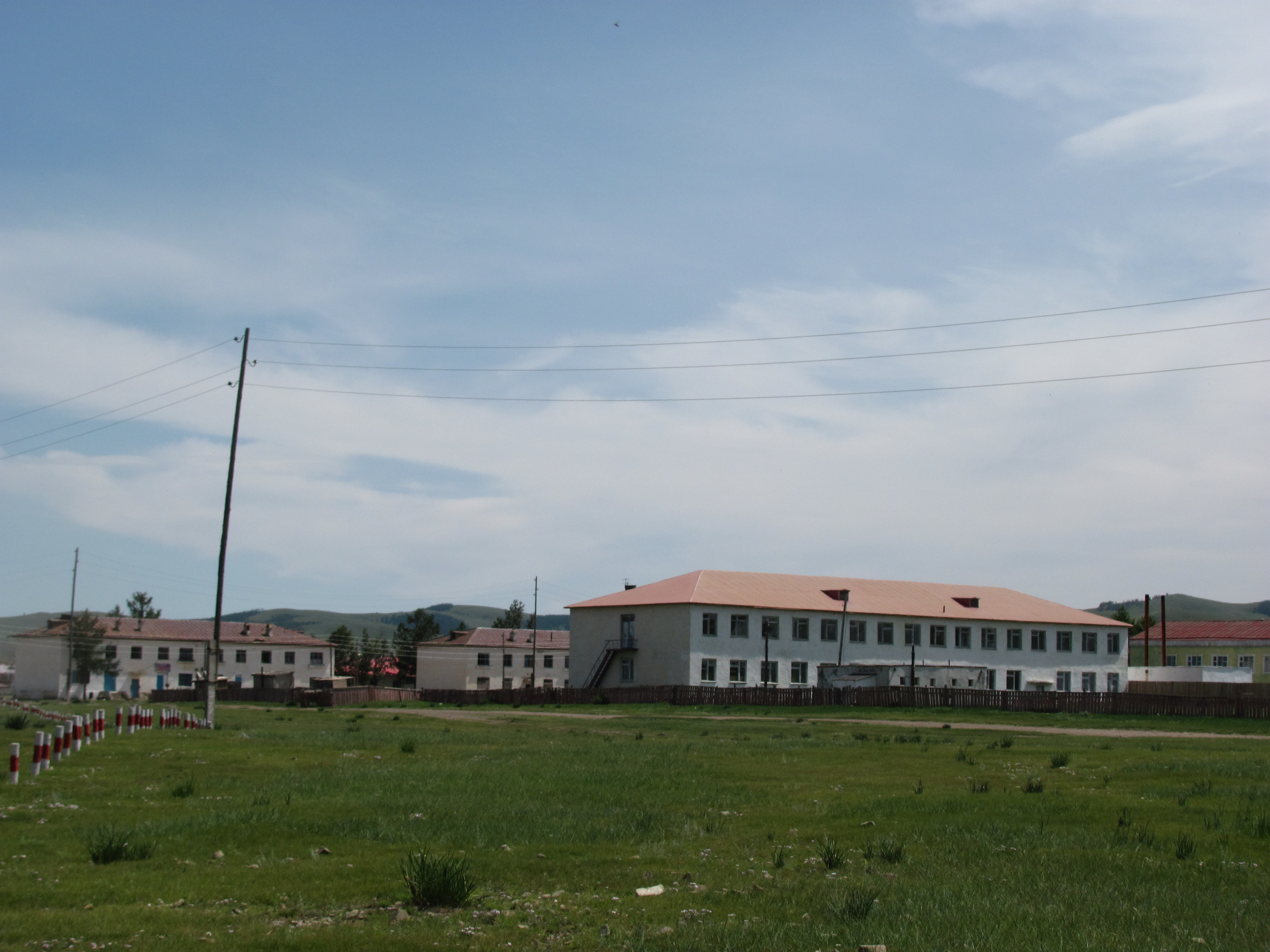
School

The Sum (1200 km^{2}) had 3438 inhabitants in 2009, 1869 of whom lived in the town of Tüvshrüülekh which is the second largest town of the province. The distance to Tsetserleg, the capital of the province, amounts to 44 km to the southeast.

The town of Tüvshrüülekh is the seat of various local authorities and schools. There are some shops and a gas station as well.

== Administrative divisions ==
The district is divided into four bags, which are:

- Bayan-Undur
- Khukh Sum
- Urantolgoi
- Urtunt

== Economy ==
- Tamir gol mine
