= Tsetserleg, Khövsgöl =

District in Khövsgöl Province, Mongolia

Coordinates: 49°31′33″N 97°44′13″E

Tsetserleg District Цэцэрлэг сум ᠴᠡᠴᠡᠷᠯᠢᠭᠰᠤᠮᠤ
- District
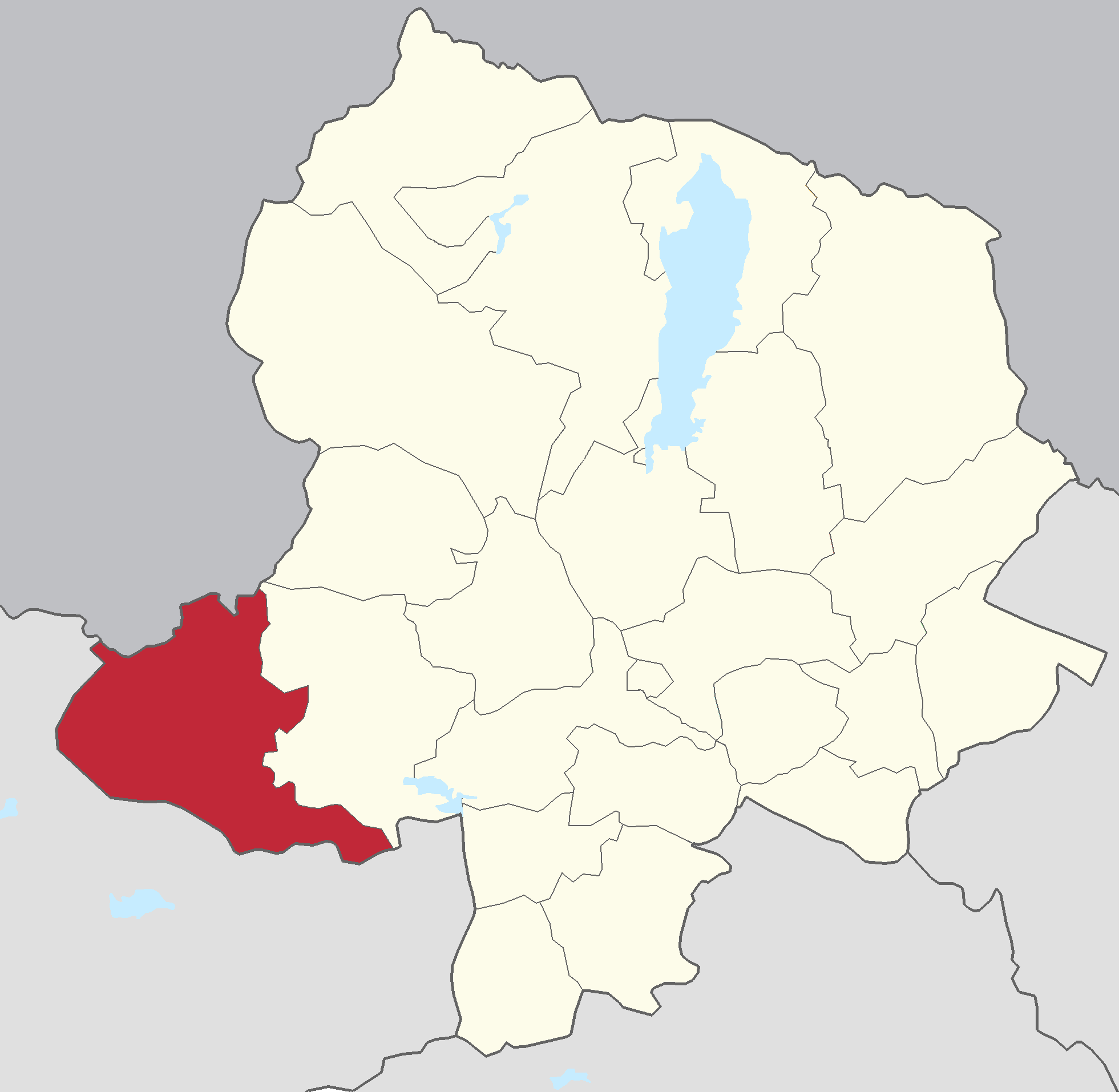
- Tsetserleg District in Khövsgöl Province
- Country: Mongolia
- Province: Khövsgöl Province
- Time zone: UTC+8 (UTC + 8)

Tsetserleg (Mongolian: Цэцэрлэг, lit. "garden") is a sum of Khövsgöl aimag, Mongolia. The area is 7,480 km^{2}, of which 6,040 km^{2} are pasture and 1,340 km^{2} are forest. 15 km^{2} are farmland. In 2000, Tsetserleg had a population of 5,876 people, mainly Khotgoid. The sum center, officially named Khalban (Mongolian: Халбан), is located 209 km west of Mörön and 880 km from Ulaanbaatar.

== History ==
A Tsetserleg sum was formed from parts of the Khantaishir uulyn aimag's Delgerkhaan uulyn khoshuu in 1930. In 1931, some bags were added, and in 1933, Tsetserleg sum had roughly 3,800 inhabitants in 1150 households, and 92,000 heads of livestock. In 1954, the local Enkh-Amidral negdel was founded.

== Administrative divisions ==
The district is divided into seven bags, which are:

- Burkheer
- Delgerkhaan
- Jargalant
- Khalban
- Mogoi Renchinjugnaii
- Sogoot
- Zuun Mod

== Economy ==
In 2004, there were about 110,000 heads of livestock, among them 45,000 goats, 48,000 sheep, 8,300 cattle and yaks, 8,100 horses, and 606 camels.

The Mogoingol Coal Mine is located in the district.

== Miscellaneous ==
Tesiin Khüree, one of the largest monasteries in this part of Mongolia, was founded close to where now the sum center is located in 1717. At its best times, the monastery housed 1,500 lamas and consisted of 6 aimags (big temples), 16 datsans (medium-sized temples), and 29 dugans (small temples). Tesiin Khüree was destroyed in the late 1930s.

== Literature ==
- M. Nyamaa, Khövsgöl aimgiin lavlakh toli, Ulaanbaatar 2001, p. 201f
