= Mandal, Selenge =

District in Selenge Province, Mongolia

Coordinates: 48.821°N 106.4963°E

Mandal District Мандал сум ᠮᠠᠨᠳᠠᠯᠰᠤᠮᠤ
- District
- Interactive map of Mandal District
- Country: Mongolia
- Province: Selenge Province

Area
  - Total: 4,843.73 km^{2} (1,870.17 sq mi)
- Time zone: UTC+8 (UTC + 8)

Mandal (Mongolian: Мандал) is a sum (district) of Selenge Province in northern Mongolia. The Züünkharaa city is Mandal sum center. The Kherkh urban-type settlement is 5 km south from Züünkharaa city center, separated with Kharaa Gol river. The Tünkhel urban-type settlement is 44 km SE from Züünkharaa city center. The population of Mandal sum is 25,600 as of 2014.

Trans-Mongolian Railway crosses the sum's territory.

Boroo Gold Mine is 30 km southwest from Züünkharaa city. Gatsuurt Gold Mine is 30 km southeast from Züünkharaa city.

== Administrative divisions ==
The district is divided into nine bags, which are:

- Bayan-Artsat
- Bayankhangai
- Bayansuudal
- Kherkh
- Minjiin Khangai
- Shirkhentseg
- Tarni
- Tumur Zam
- Tunkhel

== Ethnic composition ==
Ethnicity	Population Census 2010	Share
Khalkh	22,607	91.33%
Kazakh	380	1.54%
Bayad	374	1.51%
Dörvöd	287	1.16%
Buryad	281	1.14%
Uryankhai	222	0.90%
Zakhchin	117	0.47%
Tuva	102	0.41%
Torguud	79	0.32%
Darkhad	76	0.31%
Khoton	49	0.20%
Ööld	29	0.12%
Myangad	27	0.11%
Khotgoid	22	0.09%
Sartuul	9	0.04%
Dariganga	4	0.02%
Barga	3	0.01%
Eljigin	3	0.01%
Chantuu	2	0.01%
Khamnigan	2	0.01%
Khorchin	1	0.00%
TOTAL	24,752	100.00%

== Sister cities ==
- Uiseong, South Korea
- Uiryeong, South Korea

== Notable natives ==
- Jargaltulgyn Erdenebat, prime minister of Mongolia
