= Bayan, Töv =

District in Töv, Mongolia

Coordinates: 47°15′04″N 107°32′18″E

Bayan District Баян сум ᠪᠠᠶ᠋ᠠᠨᠰᠤᠮᠤ
- District
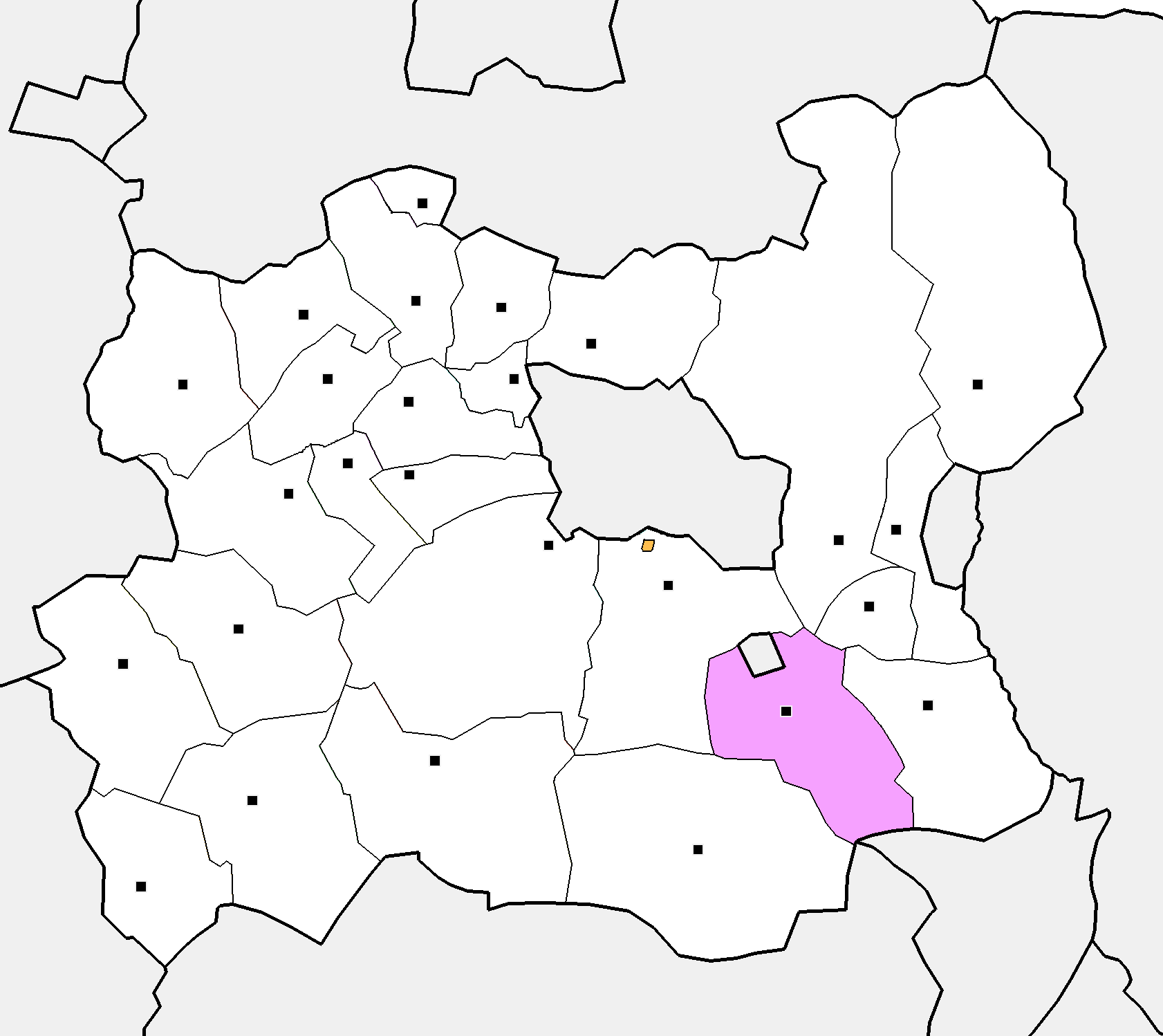
- Bayan District in Töv Province
- Country: Mongolia
- Province: Töv Province
- Time zone: UTC+8 (UTC + 8)

Bayan (Баян [páiˑɴ]), also Maanit (Мааньт [mɛ̂ːn̥ʲtʰ]), is a district of Töv Province in Mongolia.

== Administrative divisions ==
The district is divided into three bags, which are:

- Tsant
- Tsavchir
- Uguumur

== Economy ==
The district is home to Tsaidam Lake and Tugrugnuur coal mines.
