= Mönkhkhaan, Sükhbaatar =

District in Sükhbaatar Province, Mongolia

Coordinates: 46°58′13″N 112°03′08″E

Mönkhkhaan District Мөнххаан сум ᠮᠥᠩᠬᠡᠬᠠᠨᠰᠤᠮᠤ
- District
- Interactive map of Mönkhkhaan District
- Country: Mongolia
- Province: Sükhbaatar Province
- Time zone: UTC+8 (UTC + 8)

Mönkhkhaan (Mongolian: Мөнххаан, Eternal Khan) is a sum (district) of Sükhbaatar Province in eastern Mongolia. The Bürentsogt Tungsten Mine is 41 km SW from the sum center. In 2009, its population was 4,213.

== Administrative divisions ==
The district is divided into five bags, which are:

- Bayan-Uul
- Bayanterem
- Bayantsagaan
- Bayasgalant
- Burentsogt
