= Tsaidam Lake coal mine =

Coal mine in Töv, Mongolia

Tsaidam Lake Coal Mine
- Location within Mongolia
- Location: Bayan sum, Töv, Mongolia; 47°7′0″N 107°54′0″E
- Products: brown coal
- Company: Tsetsens Mining and Energy LLC

The Tsaidam Lake Coal Mine (Mongolian: Цайдам нуур, swampy lake) is a coal mine being developed in the Bayan sum of Töv aimag in central Mongolia.

The mine has coal reserves amounting to 6.8 billion tonnes of brown coal.
