= Honggor Sum, Sonid Left Banner =

Honggor Sum 洪格尔苏木
- Ethnic sum
- Location within Inner Mongolia
- Coordinates: 44°40′47″N 112°14′54″E
- Country: China
- Province-level division: Inner Mongolia
- League: Xilin Gol League
- Banner: Sonid Left Banner
- Elevation: 1,108 m (3,635 ft)

Population (2000)
  - Total: 1,621
- Time zone: UTC+8 (China Standard)
- Postal code: 152523
- Area code: 0479

Honggor Sum (Traditional Mongolian: ᠬᠣᠩᠭ᠋ᠤᠷ ᠰᠤᠮᠤ; Mongolian Cyrillic: Хонгор сум, Khongor sum; simplified Chinese: 洪格尔苏木; traditional Chinese: 洪格爾蘇木; pinyin: Hónggé'ěr Sūmù) is a sum in the Sonid Left Banner of Xilin Gol League, Inner Mongolia, China. In 2000, it had 1621 inhabitants. It is located in high desert only 38 kilometres (24 mi) from the border with Mongolia. Mongolian: хонгор, lit. 'soft, or sweetheart'.

== Administrative divisions ==
Honggor is divided into the following village-level administrative divisions:

- Taomuyilalete gaqa 陶木伊拉勒特嘎查
- Bayan-Khongor Gaqa (Chinese: 巴彦洪格尔嘎查; pinyin: Bāyàn hónggéěr gáchá)
- Wuriniletu gaqa 乌日尼勒图嘎查
- Shurichangtu gaqa 舒日昌图嘎查
- Xina midurile gaqa 新阿米都日勒嘎查
- Tabanhudouga district 塔班呼都嘎生活区
