= Tugrugnuur coal mine =

Coal mine in Töv, Mongolia

Tugrugnuur Coal Mine
- Location within Mongolia
- Location: Bayan, Töv, Mongolia; 46°55′27.0″N 108°05′47.0″E
- Products: Coking coal

The Tugrugnuur Coal Mine is a coal mine located in Bayan District, Töv Province, Mongolia. The mine has coal reserves amounting to 3.12 billion tonnes of coking coal, one of the largest coal reserves in Asia and the world. The mine has an annual production capacity of 0.05 million tonnes of coal.

== Geology ==
The mine covers an area of around 30 km^{2}.
