= Chandgana Tal =

Mine in Mörön, Khentii, Mongolia

- Location within Mongolia
- Location: Mörön sum, Khentii, Mongolia; 47°23′12″N 110°01′41″E
- Products: Coking coal

Chandgana Tal (Mongolian: Чандгана Тал, rigid-steel steppe) is a coal mine in the Mörön sum (district) of Khentii Province in eastern Mongolia.

The Chandgana Coal Mine is a coal mine located in eastern Mongolia. The mine has coal reserves amounting to 1.17 billion tonnes of coking coal, one of the largest coal reserves in Asia and the world. The mine has an annual production capacity of 3 million tonnes of coal.

== Geography ==
Changana Tal mine is 25 km W from Mörön sum center and 53 km W from Khentii aimag capital Öndörkhaan. Changana Tal mine is in the bag #5 of Mörön sum.

== History ==
Chandgana Tal coal was first discovered by Russian surface reconnaissance in 1941 and subsequently explored in detail in 1962–1963. In 1967, a small mine was opened to supply heating coal for local consumption (Öndörkhaan city) and the mine has operated more-or-less continuously since, producing up to 20,000 tonnes of coal per year.
