= Khuut coal mine =

Coal mine in Matad, Dornod, Mongolia

Khuut Coal Mine
- Location within Mongolia
- Location: Matad sum, Dornod, Mongolia; 46°58′N 114°50′E
- Products: brown coal

The Khuut Coal Mine is a coal mine located in Matad District, Dornod Province, Mongolia.

The mine has coal reserves amounting to 294.2 million tonnes (289,600,000 long tons; 324,300,000 short tons) of brown coal. The mine has an annual production capacity of 120,000 tonnes (120,000 long tons; 130,000 short tons) of coal.

== History ==
The mine was discovered during the exploration which lasted from 1973 to 1979.
