= Khökh-Adar mine =

Copper mine in Tolbo, Bayan-Ölgii, Mongolia

- Location within Mongolia
- Location: Tolbo sum, Bayan-Ölgii, Mongolia; 48°18′N 90°22′E
- Products: Copper
- Company: EAM Khukh Adar

The Khökh-Adar mine (Mongolian: Хөх-Адар, blue ceiling) is an exploration field and mine in development for copper extraction located in the Tolbo sum of Bayan-Ölgii aimag in western Mongolia.

The reserves holds approximately 96,700 tons of copper, 43,200 tons of lead, and 18,200 tons of zinc.
