= Hunnu Coal =

Mining company operating in Mongolia

Hunnu Coal Limited
- Type: Public
- Traded as: ASX: HUN
- Industry: Mining
- Founded: 2009
- Headquarters: Ulaanbaatar, Mongolia; West Perth, Australia
- Key people: Matthew Wood, Executive Chairman; Lkhagvadorj Tumur, managing director Timothy Flavel, executive director and company secretary
- Products: Coking and thermal coal
- Website: http://www.hunnucoal.com

Hunnu Coal Limited is a mining company that is incorporated in Australia for the purpose of acquiring and developing coal projects in Mongolia.

The company runs mining operations through its subsidiary, Hunnu Resources LLC, in four provinces of Mongolia including South Gobi, Middles Gobi and Sukhbaatar. Hunnu Coal is expected to produce 1.5 million tonnes of coal from the Tsant Uul deposit in Mongolia in 2012 and three million tonnes in 2013. It started its first coal production in 2011.

Hunnu Coal Limited doubled the resource for its Unst Khudag thermal coal project to 676 million tons in mid-2011. On 21 July 2011, the management of Hunnu Coal has announced that the company would make 85% increase in their share of JORC Coal Resource at Tsant Uul.

The company listed at the Australian Stock Exchange on 12 February 2010. Among newly issued mining stocks in past 24 months, stocks of Hunnu Coal Limited performed best. Australia's Resource Stocks Magazine selected Hunnu Coal Limited's IPO as the Best Australian IPO of 2010. MICC, Mongolia's broker and dealer company, assessed Hunnu Coal's projects that they have a high-potential growth. Hunnu Coal Ltd. is also targeting the Hong Kong Stock Exchange and London Stock Exchange to issue shares.

On 19 September 2011 Hunnu Coal Limited has announced the issuance of new ordinary shares as part consideration for the acquisition of the Altai Nuurs coking coal project.

Banpu PCL's subsidiary, Banpu Minerals Pte Ltd, intends to make cash offers for all of the shares in Hunnu Coal Ltd that Banpu does not already own.
