= Darkhan Metallurgical Plant =

Factory in Darkhan, Darkhan-Uul, Mongolia

Darkhan Metallurgical Plant Дарханы Төмөрлөгийн Үйлдвэр
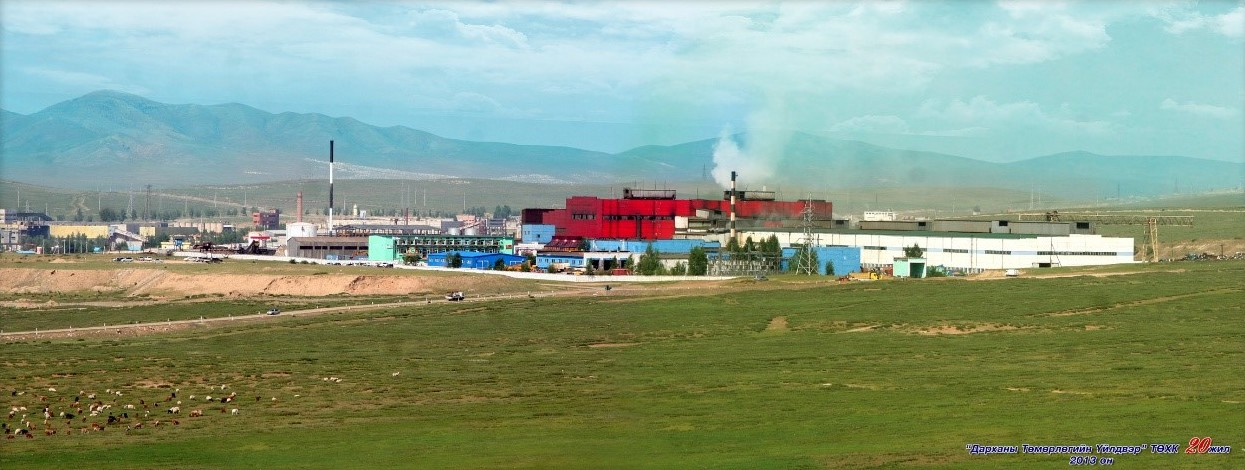
- Built: 1994
- Operated: 1994
- Location: Darkhan, Darkhan-Uul, Mongolia
- Coordinates: 49°25′05.5″N 105°57′28.9″E
- Website: Official website

The Darkhan Metallurgical Plant (DMP; Mongolian: Дарханы Төмөрлөгийн Үйлдвэр) is a metallurgy plant in Darkhan, Darkhan-Uul Province, Mongolia.

== History ==
The construction of the plant started in 1990. The plant then came into operation in 1994. The plant will achieve its full operation and production capacity by 2028.

== Production ==
The plant acquires the raw iron ore from the nearby Tumurtolgoi Iron Ore Mine in Khongor District. It produces 100,000 tons of steel products and 2.5 million tons of iron ore concentrate annually.
