= Khovd Gol Mine =

Mine in Tsengel, Bayan-Ölgii, Mongolia

Khovd Gol mine
- Location within Mongolia
- Location: Tsengel sum, Bayan-Ölgii, Mongolia; 48°43′27″N 88°50′13″E
- Products: Tungsten
- Company: SS Mongolia Ltd.

The Khovd Gol mine (Mongolian: Ховд гол, Khovd River) is an underground mine located in the Tsengel District, Bayan-Ölgii Province, Mongolia.

The reserves of the deposit are estimated at 26,300 tonnes of tungsten at an ore concentration of 5–19.3%.
