= Tamir gol mine =

Mine in Tüvshrüülekh, Arkhangai, Mongolia

Tamirgol mine
- Location within Mongolia
- Location: Tüvshrüülekh sum, Arkhangai, Mongolia; 47°35′20″N 102°15′0″E
- Products: Iron ore

The Tamir gol mine (Mongolian: Тамир гол, Tamir River) is an iron mine located in the Tüvshrüülekh sum of Arkhangai aimag in central Mongolia.

The reserves of the mine are estimated at up to 60,000 tonnes (59,000 long tons; 66,000 short tons) of iron, at an ore concentration between 42% and 49%.
