= Ulaan-Uul mine =

Mine in Nogoonnuur, Bayan-Ölgii, Mongolia

- Location within Mongolia
- Location: Nogoonnuur sum, Bayan-Ölgii, Mongolia; 49°13′35″N 90°14′15″E
- Products: Tungsten

The Ulaan-Uul mine (Mongolian: Улаан Уул, red mountain) is an underground mine located in Nogoonnuur District, Bayan-Ölgii Province, Mongolia.

Ulaan-Uuul exploits the Kyzyl Tau ore field. The main ore minerals in the veins are wolframite, fluorite, beryl and minor molybdenite. The reserves are estimated at 3.100 tons of wolfram at an ore concentration of 1.3 - 3.4%.
