= Tevshiin Govi coal mine =

Coal mine in Dundgovi, Mongolia

Tevshiin Govi Coal Mine
- Location within Mongolia
- Location: Saintsagaan sum, Dundgovi, Mongolia; 45°59′43″N 106°7′45″E
- Products: Brown coal
- Company: Tevshiin Govi LLC

The Tevshiin Govi Coal Mine (Mongolian: Тэвшийн говь) is a coal mine located in Saintsagaan District of Dundgovi aimag in southern central Mongolia.

The mine has coal reserves amounting to 923.2 million tonnes of Brown coal. The mine has an annual production capacity of 0.05 million tonnes of coal.

== History ==
The mine was established in 1990.
