= Darvi, Khovd =

District in Khovd Province, Mongolia

Coordinates: 46°56′12″N 93°37′06″E

Darvi District Дарви сум ᠳᠠᠷᠪᠢᠰᠤᠮᠤ
- District
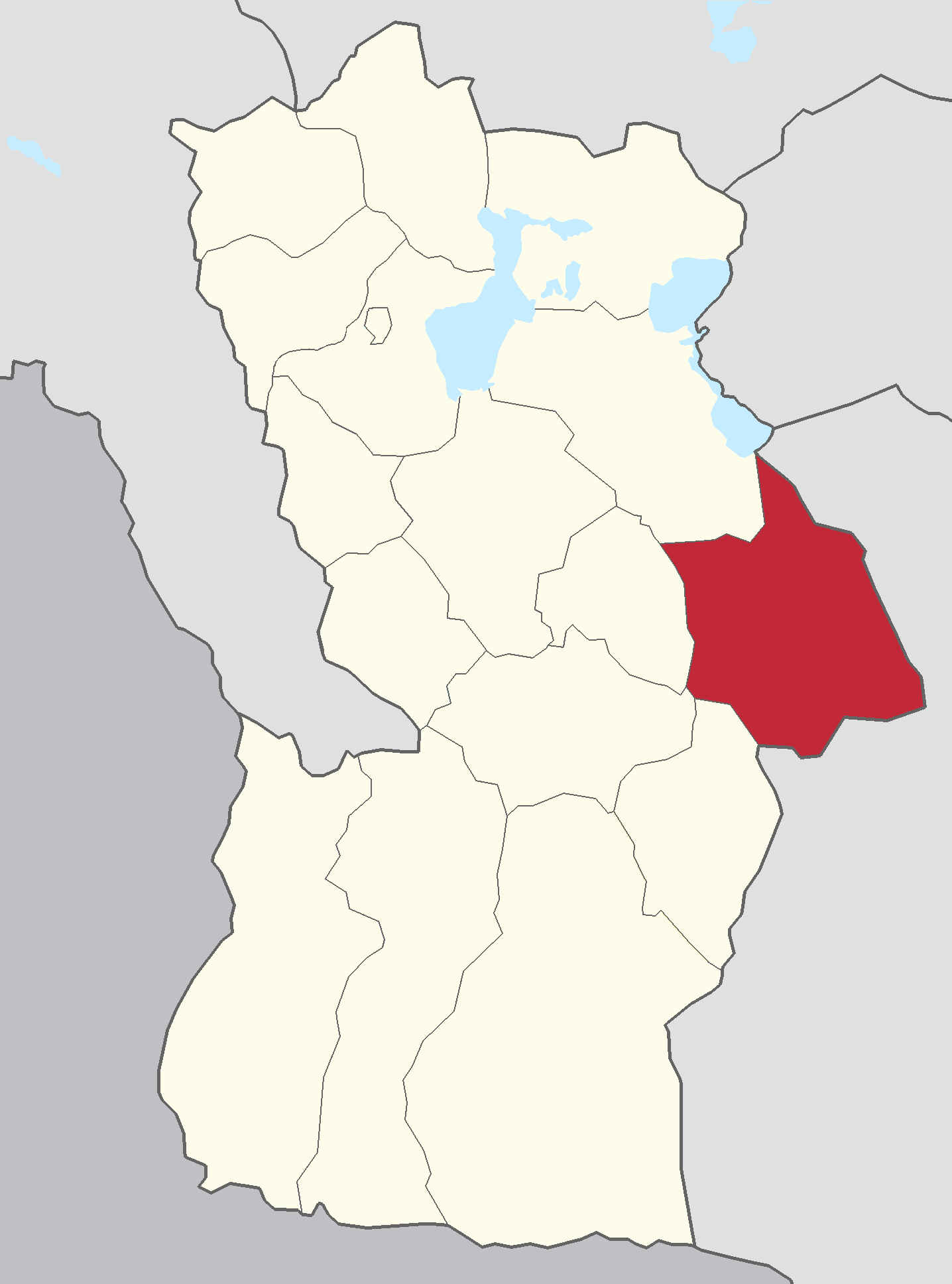
- Darvi District in Khovd Province
- Country: Mongolia
- Province: Khovd Province

Area
  - Total: 5,604 km^{2} (2,164 sq mi)
- Time zone: UTC+7 (UTC + 7)

Darvi (Mongolian: Дарви) is a sum (district) of Khovd Province in western Mongolia. It is 204 km away from the city of Khovd.

== Administrative divisions ==
The district is divided into five bags, which are:

- Bulag
- Bulgan
- Delger
- Mungun Ayaga
- Murun
