= Mandakh, Dornogovi =

District in Dornogovi Province, Mongolia

Coordinates: 44°24′22″N 108°15′08″E

Mandakh District Мандах сум ᠮᠠᠨᠳᠤᠬᠤᠰᠤᠮᠤ
- District
- Interactive map of Mandakh District
- Country: Mongolia
- Province: Dornogovi Province

Area
  - Total: 12,660.61 km^{2} (4,888.29 sq mi)
- Time zone: UTC+8 (UTC + 8)

Mandakh (Mongolian: Мандах, Rise) is a sum (district) of Dornogovi Province in south-eastern Mongolia. In 2009, its population was 1,528.

== Administrative divisions ==
The district is divided into five bags, which are:

- Alkhanteeg
- Bayankhoshuu
- Serven bayankhoshuu
- Tukhum
- Uyekhii
