= Saikhan-Ovoo coal mine =

Coal mine in Bulgan, Mongolia

Saikhan-Ovoo Coal Mine
- Location within Mongolia
- Location: Saikhan-Ovoo/Saikhan sum, Bulgan, Mongolia; 48°48′18″N 102°25′10″E
- Products: Coking coal
- Company: Asia Coal Ltd.
- Website: www.asiacoallimited.com

The Saikhan-Ovoo Coal Mine (Mongolian: Сайхан Овоо, beautiful mound) is an underground coal mine located near Saikhan-Ovoo in the Saikhan sum of Bulgan aimag in northern Mongolia, to the north of Saikhan-Ovoo Mountain.

The mine has coal reserves amounting to 190 million tonnes of coking coal.
