= Züünkharaa, Selenge =

City in Selenge, Mongolia

Züünkharaa, Selenge Зүүнхараа ᠵᠡᠭᠦᠨᠬᠠᠷᠠᠭ᠎ᠠ
- City
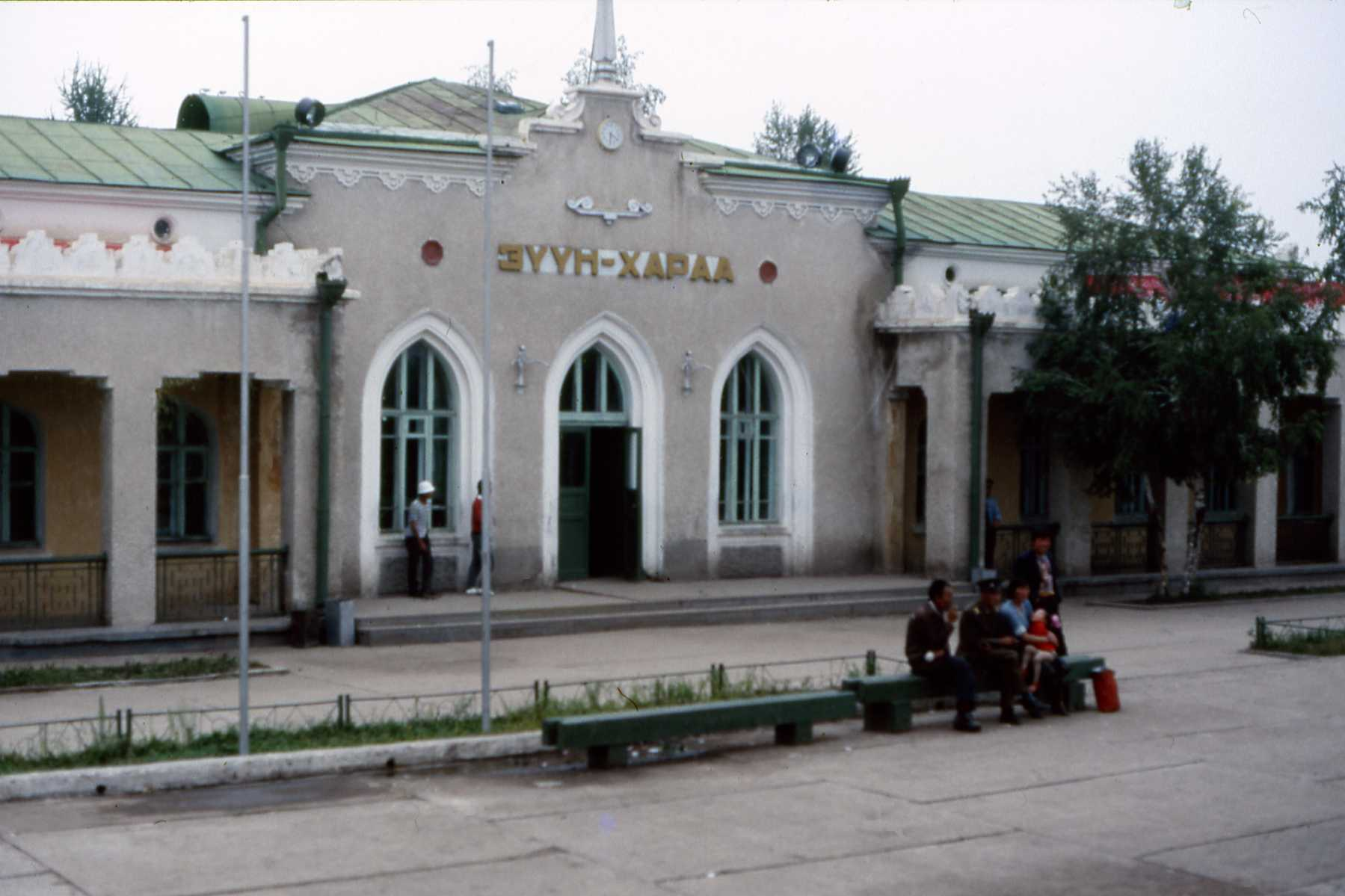
- Züünkharaa railway station

- Location within Mongolia
- Coordinates: 48.51°N 106.27°E
- Province: Selenge

Population (2022)
  - Total: 25,105

Züünkharaa, Selenge

Mongolian name
- Mongolian Cyrillic: Зүүнхараа
- Mongolian script: ᠵᠡᠭᠦᠨᠬᠠᠷᠠᠭ᠎ᠠ
Transcriptions
- SASM/GNC: Züünkharaa

Züünkharaa (Mongolian: Зүүнхараа) is a city, the center of the Mandal sum (district) in the province of Selenge, located in northern Mongolia. This makes it part of the biggest district in the entire country. As of 2022, the population is estimated at 25,105 divided amongst 7,103 households. Züünkharaa is connected to the capital city of Ulaanbaatar and the northern city of Darkhan by the Trans-Mongolian Railway.

Züünkharaa contains 6 kindergartens, 1 elementary school, and 6 high schools.

Since 1943, Züünkharaa has been home to the Spirit Bal Buram factory, a vodka factory with a production capacity of 15 tonnes of vodka (approximately 140 barrels) every 24 hours.

== History ==
In 1994, residents of Tünkhel and Züünkharaa voted in a plebiscite to unify their two districts. This vote was brought before the 36th State Great Khural, which combined the two areas making Züünkharaa the center of the Mandal district, and making Mandal the largest district in Mongolia.

== Location ==
Züünkharaa is located at the southern tip of Selenge, making it situated just north of the bordering province Töv. It is just northwest of the Khentii Mountains, with the range itself being just visible from the outskirts of the city. The Kharaa river runs through the southern half of city, and separates its center from Kherkh khoroolol. It's located 174 km away from Ulaanbaatar, and 201 km away from the provincial capital of Sükhbaatar, making it closer to the national capital than its provincial one.
