= Matad =

District in Dornod Province, Mongolia

Matad District Матад сум ᠮᠠᠲᠠᠳᠰᠤᠮᠤ
- District
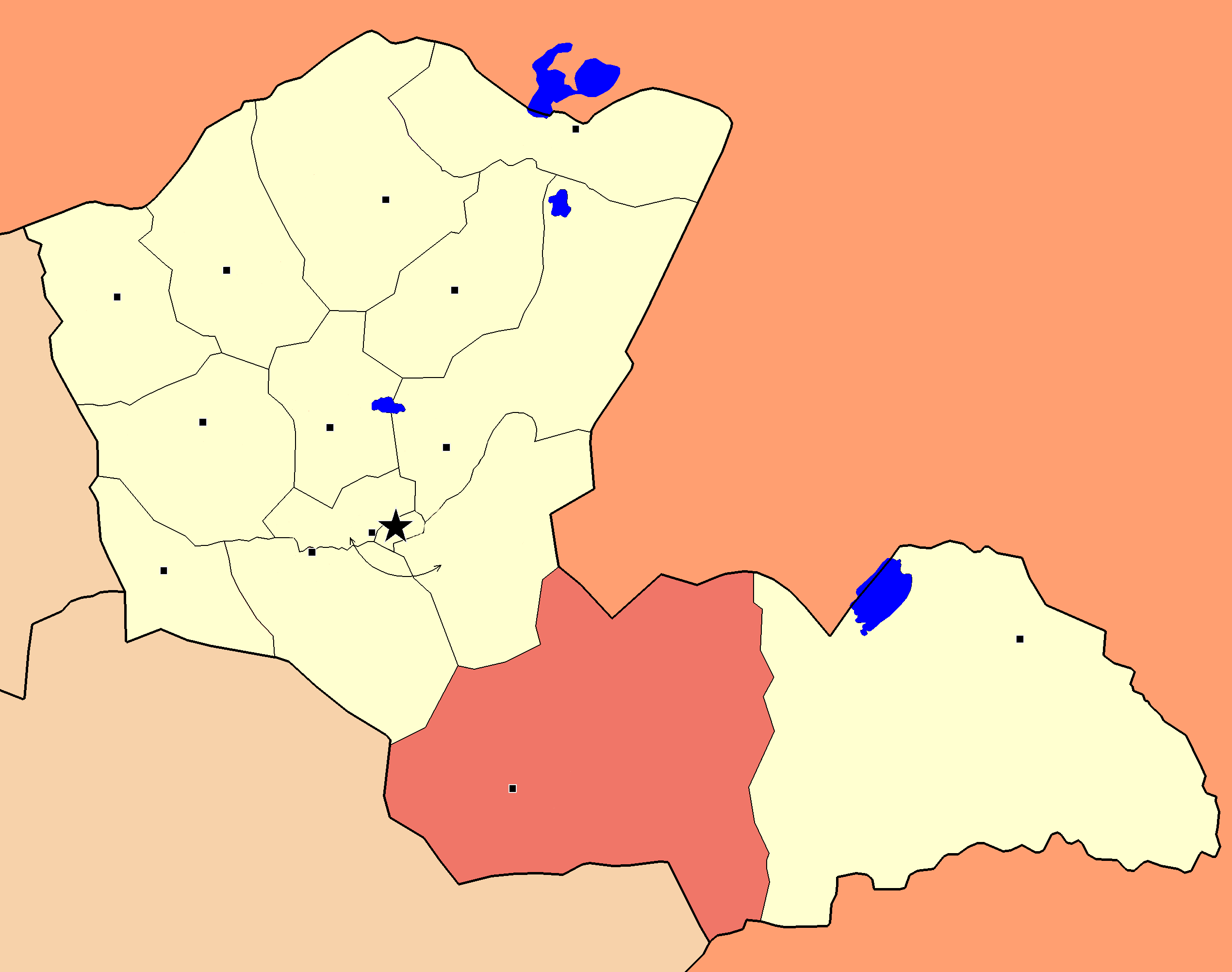
- Matad District in Dornod Province

- Location within Mongolia
- Coordinates: 46°57′7″N 115°17′34″E
- Country: Mongolia
- Province: Dornod Province

Area
  - Total: 22,831 km^{2} (8,815 sq mi)
- Time zone: UTC+8 (UTC + 8)

Matad (Mongolian: Матад [mátʰət]) is a district of Dornod Province in eastern Mongolia. As of the 2009 census, its population was 2,526, of whom 834 live in the center. It is named after Matad Khan Mountain, a sacred mountain revered in the area. The district covers an area of 22,831 km² with a population density of 0.11 people/km².

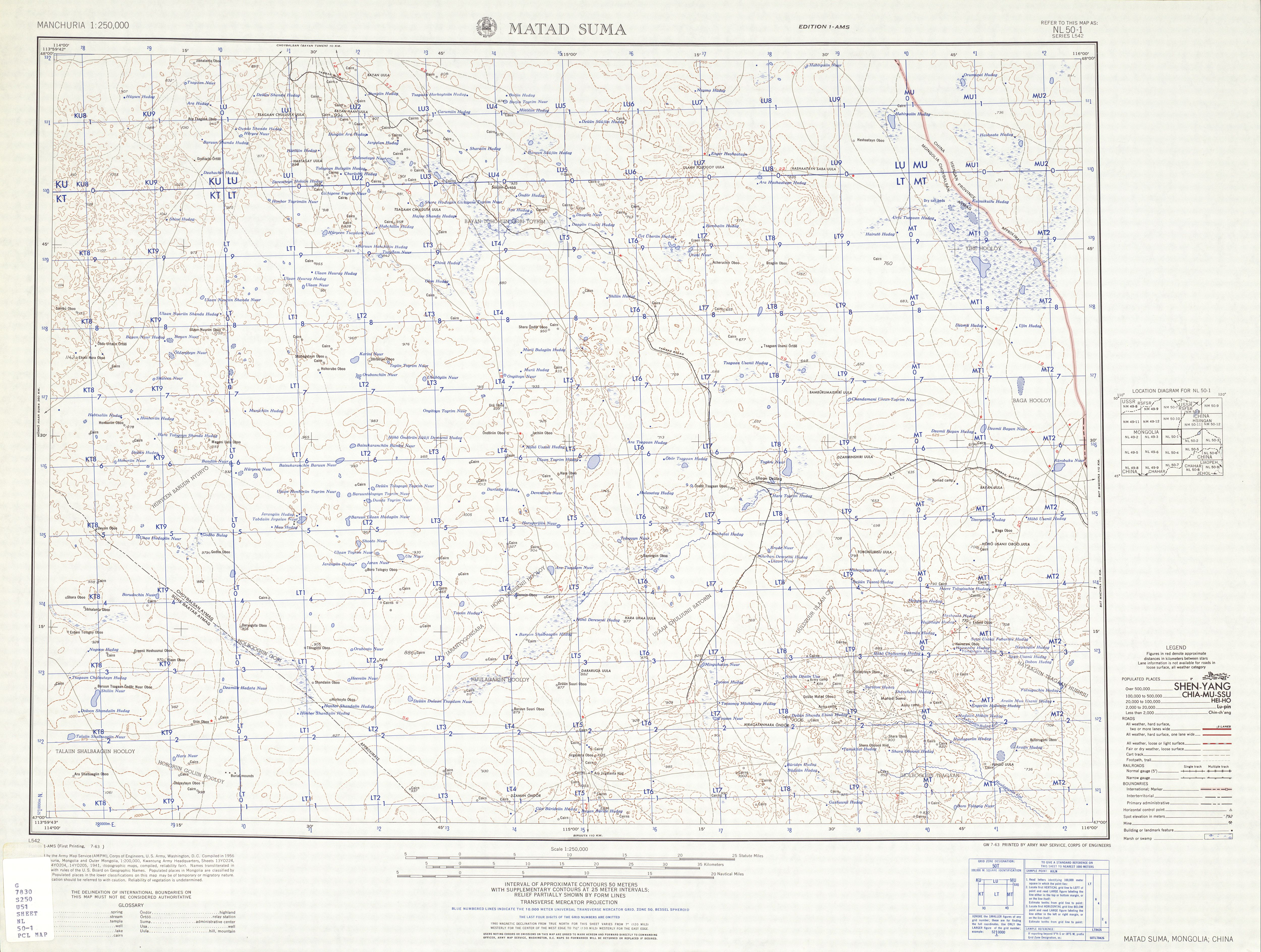
Matad (1956)

== Geography ==
Matad is the second largest district in Dornod Province after Khalkhgol District.

== Climate ==
Matad has a semi-arid climate (Köppen climate classification BSk) with warm summers and severely cold winters. Most precipitation falls in the summer as rain, with some snow in autumn and spring. Winters are very dry.

Climate data for Matad, elevation 907 m (2,976 ft), (1991–2020 normals, extremes 1975–1990, 1999–2023)
Month	Jan	Feb	Mar	Apr	May	Jun	Jul	Aug	Sep	Oct	Nov	Dec	Year
Record high °C (°F)	2.5 (36.5)	7.9 (46.2)	21.3 (70.3)	29.3 (84.7)	37.1 (98.8)	40.8 (105.4)	40.2 (104.4)	40.7 (105.3)	36.5 (97.7)	28.2 (82.8)	17.3 (63.1)	6.6 (43.9)	40.8 (105.4)
Mean daily maximum °C (°F)	−13.5 (7.7)	−8.7 (16.3)	1.0 (33.8)	11.7 (53.1)	19.7 (67.5)	25.2 (77.4)	27.4 (81.3)	25.8 (78.4)	19.7 (67.5)	9.4 (48.9)	−2.8 (27.0)	−11.5 (11.3)	8.6 (47.5)
Daily mean °C (°F)	−19.0 (−2.2)	−14.8 (5.4)	−6.3 (20.7)	4.3 (39.7)	12.1 (53.8)	18.4 (65.1)	21.2 (70.2)	18.9 (66.0)	12.3 (54.1)	2.3 (36.1)	−9.2 (15.4)	−16.7 (1.9)	2.0 (35.5)
Mean daily minimum °C (°F)	−24.6 (−12.3)	−20.9 (−5.6)	−13.4 (7.9)	−3.4 (25.9)	4.2 (39.6)	11.3 (52.3)	14.9 (58.8)	12.3 (54.1)	5.1 (41.2)	−4.1 (24.6)	−15.1 (4.8)	−22.2 (−8.0)	−4.7 (23.6)
Record low °C (°F)	−41.5 (−42.7)	−40.7 (−41.3)	−34 (−29)	−19.2 (−2.6)	−11.0 (12.2)	−0.9 (30.4)	4.4 (39.9)	−0.8 (30.6)	−7.5 (18.5)	−20.2 (−4.4)	−31.6 (−24.9)	−37.9 (−36.2)	−41.5 (−42.7)
Average precipitation mm (inches)	1.9 (0.07)	2.0 (0.08)	3.6 (0.14)	6.0 (0.24)	17.8 (0.70)	48.0 (1.89)	74.4 (2.93)	40.6 (1.60)	19.4 (0.76)	6.5 (0.26)	3.4 (0.13)	3.4 (0.13)	227 (8.93)
Average precipitation days (≥ 1.0 mm)	0.5	0.7	1.0	1.3	3.7	6.0	8.3	6.2	4.2	1.8	1.1	1.0	35.8
Source 1: NOAA
Source 2: Starlings Roost Weather

== Administrative divisions ==
The district is divided into six bags, which are:

- Bayankhangai
- Buyan-Undur
- Erdenebadrakh
- Jargalant
- Menen
- Tumenkhaan
