= Saikhan-Ovoo, Bulgan =

Bag in Saikhan, Bulgan, Mongolia

Coordinates: 48°48′19″N 102°23′57″E

Saikhan-Ovoo (Mongolian: Сайхан-Овоо) is a bag in Saikhan District of Bulgan Province, Mongolia.

The population of Saikhan-Ovoo is 500 (or 124 households) (end of 2006).

== Geography ==
Saikhan-Ovoo is near the Saikhan-Ovoo mountain, 25 kilometres (16 mi) north-west of Saikhan sum centre, and 100 kilometres (62 mi) west of Bulgan city, the capital of Bulgan Province.

== Climate ==
Saikhan-Ovoo has a cold desert climate (Köppen climate classification BWk) with warm summers and very cold winters. Most precipitation falls in the summer as rain. Winters are very dry.

Climate data for Saikhan-Ovoo, elevation 1,316 m (4,318 ft), (1991–2020 normals, extremes 1967–1990)
Month	Jan	Feb	Mar	Apr	May	Jun	Jul	Aug	Sep	Oct	Nov	Dec	Year
Record high °C (°F)	8.5 (47.3)	13.8 (56.8)	19.1 (66.4)	26.8 (80.2)	34.1 (93.4)	35.9 (96.6)	37.5 (99.5)	36.4 (97.5)	30.8 (87.4)	24.3 (75.7)	18.8 (65.8)	7.2 (45.0)	37.5 (99.5)
Mean daily maximum °C (°F)	−10.7 (12.7)	−5.5 (22.1)	5.0 (41.0)	14.3 (57.7)	20.8 (69.4)	26.4 (79.5)	28.8 (83.8)	27.1 (80.8)	20.6 (69.1)	11.6 (52.9)	0.0 (32.0)	−9.3 (15.3)	10.8 (51.4)
Daily mean °C (°F)	−19.1 (−2.4)	−15.0 (5.0)	−3.3 (26.1)	6.4 (43.5)	13.4 (56.1)	19.6 (67.3)	22.3 (72.1)	20.3 (68.5)	13.3 (55.9)	3.5 (38.3)	−7.7 (18.1)	−17.0 (1.4)	3.1 (37.5)
Mean daily minimum °C (°F)	−25.6 (−14.1)	−22.4 (−8.3)	−11.5 (11.3)	−1.6 (29.1)	5.3 (41.5)	12.3 (54.1)	15.6 (60.1)	13.5 (56.3)	5.6 (42.1)	−3.9 (25.0)	−14.3 (6.3)	−23.5 (−10.3)	−4.2 (24.4)
Record low °C (°F)	−39.6 (−39.3)	−38.6 (−37.5)	−36.1 (−33.0)	−17.3 (0.9)	−7.9 (17.8)	−1.3 (29.7)	4.8 (40.6)	−0.7 (30.7)	−14.0 (6.8)	−27.2 (−17.0)	−32.7 (−26.9)	−38.9 (−38.0)	−39.6 (−39.3)
Average precipitation mm (inches)	0.6 (0.02)	1.2 (0.05)	1.6 (0.06)	2.1 (0.08)	9.6 (0.38)	15.3 (0.60)	38.6 (1.52)	25.0 (0.98)	11.9 (0.47)	4.0 (0.16)	1.4 (0.06)	0.8 (0.03)	112.1 (4.41)
Average precipitation days (≥ 1.0 mm)	0.1	0.2	0.6	0.5	1.5	2.7	5.9	4.1	1.5	0.7	0.6	0.2	18.6
Source 1: NOAA (precipitation 1967-1990)
Source 2: Starlings Roost Weather

== Economy ==
Saikhan-Ovoo coal mine has estimated coal resources of up to 190 million tonnes.
