= Boroo Gold Mine =

Gold mine in Selenge, Mongolia

Boroo
- Location in Mongolia
- Location: Selenge, Mongolia; 48°44′45″N 106°10′10″E
- Company: Steppe Gold (Boroo Gold LLC)
- Website: boroogold.mn

Boroo Gold Mine is an open-pit gold mining site in Bayangol and Mandal sums (districts) of Selenge Province in northern Mongolia. Gatsuurt Gold Mine is 35 E from Boroo Gold Mine.

Boroo was owned by the Canadian mining company, Centerra Gold Inc. It began commercial production in March 2004 and produced more than 1.5 million ounces (46 tons) of gold by the end of 2010. The Boroo mine was the first hard-rock gold mine established in Mongolia and the largest foreign investment in the country at the time it began production. Boroo is estimated to have increased the entire country's GDP by 5–7 %.

On October 12, 2018 Centerra Gold sold its Mongolian business unit (including the Boroo project and related infrastructure as well as the Gatsuurt development property) to OZD ASIA PTE Ltd., a private Singapore based company.

On August 1, 2024, Steppe Gold Ltd. completed its acquisition of all issued and outstanding shares of Boroo Gold LLC from an affiliate of Boroo Pte Ltd., creating Mongolia's largest primary gold producer. The strategic transaction significantly expanded Steppe Gold's operational portfolio—bringing in steady cash flows and an estimated 431,000 ounces of projected gold production through 2031—while establishing Boroo Singapore as a major controlling shareholder in the combined company.
