= Saikhan, Bulgan =

District in Bulgan Province, Mongolia

Coordinates: 48°39′36″N 102°37′21″E

Saikhan District Сайхан сум ᠰᠠᠶᠢᠬᠠᠨᠰᠤᠮᠤ
- District
- Interactive map of Saikhan District
- Country: Mongolia
- Province: Bulgan Province

Area
  - Total: 1,012 km^{2} (391 sq mi)
- Time zone: UTC+8 (UTC + 8)

Saikhan (Mongolian: Сайхан [ˈsɛːχəɴ]; lit. 'beautiful') is a district of Bulgan Province in northern Mongolia. In 2009, its population was 3,747.

== Geography ==
The district has a total area of 1,012 km^{2}.

== Administrative divisions ==
The district is divided into six bags, which are:

- Ikh Khuremt
- Khulij
- Manuult
- Saikhan-Ovoo
- Ugalz
- Undrakh

== Notable natives ==
Judoka Naidangiin Tüvshinbayar, Mongolia's first Olympic gold medalist, hails from Saikhan.
