= Bürentsogt Tungsten Mine =

Mine in Mönkhkhaan, Sukhbaatar, Mongolia

Coordinates: 46°44′19″N 111°42′03″E

Bürentsogt Tungsten Mine (Mongolian: Бүрэнцогт) is a former mine (closed around 2009) and a settlement in Mönkhkhaan sum (district) of Sükhbaatar Province in eastern Mongolia. This mine is 41 km SW from sum center.

Tungsten production was mainly by a joint venture of Mongolia and the former East Germany.

Tungsten artisanal mining is present
