= Gatsuurt Gold Mine =

Planned gold mining site in Mongolia

Coordinates: 48°38′09″N 106°38′02″E

Gatsuurt Gold Mine is a planned open-pit gold mining site in Mandal sum (district) of Selenge Province, Mongolia. Gatsuurt gold mine is 35 kilometers east of Boroo Gold Mine.

== History ==
Gatsuurt had initially been developed by the Canadian mining company Centerra Gold. However, the project encountered permitting delays with the Mongolian government and pressure from local activists. The Save Mount Noyon Movement, a local group, formed to oppose the mine's construction due to worries about the environment's impact on nearby rivers and meadows as well as access to Mount Noyon, a site of prayer.

Centerra Gold eventually gave up entirely on Mongolia. It sold its Mongolian business unit (including the Boroo project and related infrastructure as well as the Gatsuurt development property) to OZD Asia Pte Ltd., a private Singapore based company.
