= Khongor, Darkhan-Uul =

District in Darkhan-Uul Province, Mongolia

Coordinates: 49°18′26″N 105°56′11″E

Khongor District Хонгор сум ᠬᠣᠩᠭ᠋ᠤᠷᠰᠤᠮᠤ
- District
- Interactive map of Khongor District
- Country: Mongolia
- Province: Darkhan-Uul Province

Area
  - Total: 2,533 km^{2} (978 sq mi)
- Time zone: UTC+8 (UTC + 8)
- Climate: Dwb

Khongor (Mongolian: Хонгор, soft or sweetheart) is a sum (district) of Darkhan-Uul Province in northern Mongolia. The sum center has railway station on the Ulan-Ude - Ulaanbaatar - Beijing line. The most important railway station is 13 km south of the sum center, where at Salkhit settlement Salkhit - Erdenet line starts.

== History ==
The soum was established in 1958 and was one of the four largest collective crop farms in Mongolian People's Republic. The soum has been the main provider of wheat with large fields of cultivated lands until the country's state-owned enetrprises were privatized in the 1990s.

On 24 July 1999, Khongor recorded a temperature of 44.0 °C (111.2 °F), which is the highest temperature that has ever been recorded in Mongolia.

=== Mining-related Chemical Contamination ===
In 2007, Khongor was the scene of an apparently massive contamination case that involved sodium cyanide and mercury compounds, materials used for small-scale gold mining. The case aroused considerable attention in the national media, and it was even discussed to relocate the settlement. The resident of Khongor, who died of cancer, and the number of premature and maternity mortal rate rose significantly. As a result of the contamination, more than half of the population left, leaving over 400 residents in the soum as of 2014.

At the request of the Government of Mongolia, World Health Organisation conducted a field investigation in Khongor. The WHO team announced that Khongor was not as severely contaminated with mercury as Bornuur and Zaamar, for instance. Khongor soum's citizens' representative group and the Mongolian National Green Movement, accused the government of covering up a case of environmental pollution that had been endangering residents' lives.

A Chinese-owned mining company was allegedly using chemicals in the area. The Chinese company declined to sign a joint appeal, backed by all other participants, calling on the President and the Speaker of the Mongolian Parliament to provide immediate humanitarian assistance to the residents of Khongor soum, halt artisanal gold mining, and have Mongolia join the international convention against environmental crimes. The Prime Minister Sanjiin Bayar did not acknowledge the disaster, however, long after his term ended, he later made apology for his mishandling and irresponsible behavior.

== Economy ==
- Tumurtolgoi Iron Ore Mine
