= Mongolyn Alt (MAK) Corporation =

Company of Mongolia

"Mongolyn Alt" (MAK) LLC
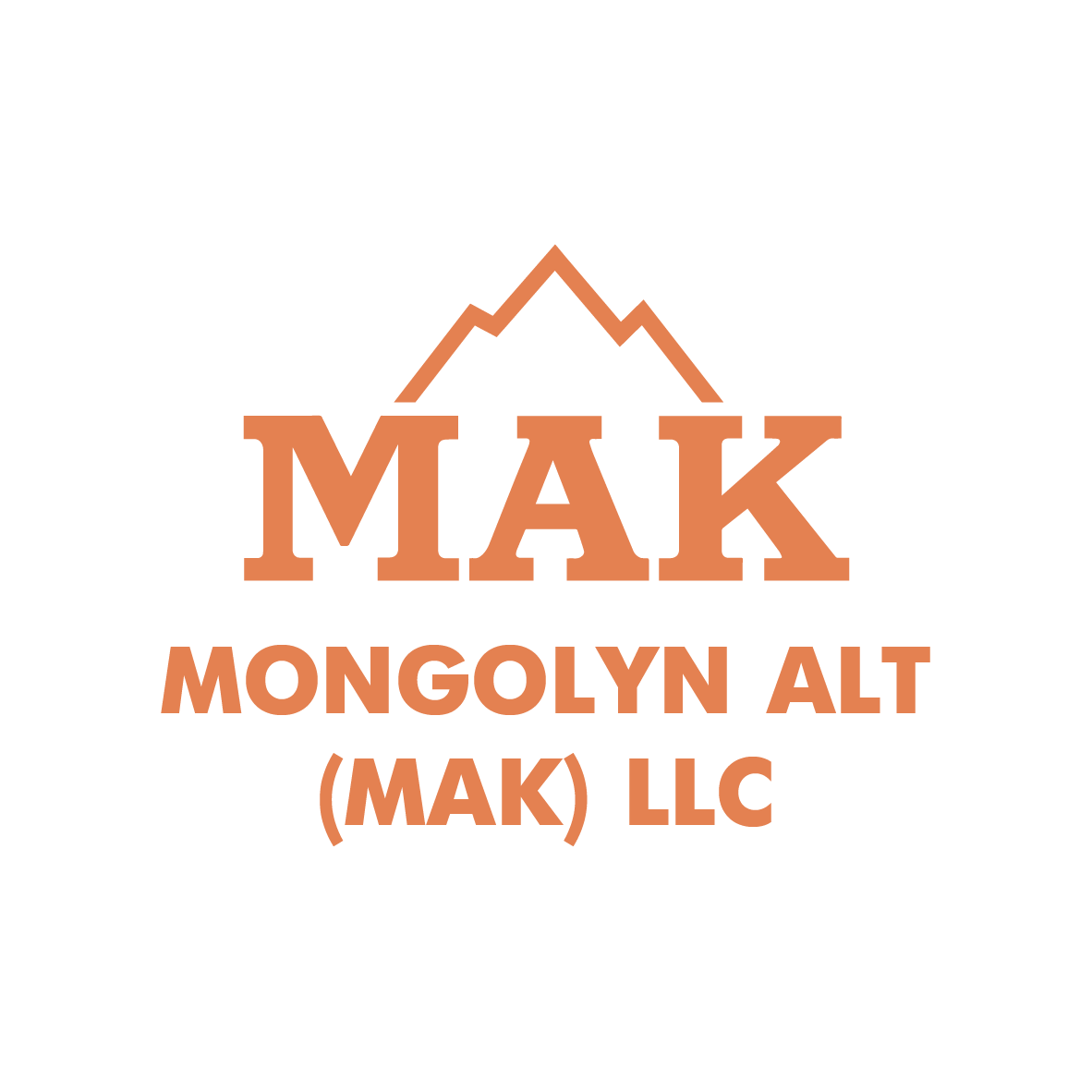
- Type: Private
- Industry: Mining, building materials
- Founded: 14 December 1993
- Founder: Byambaagiin Nyamtaishir
- Headquarters: Mongolia
- Area served: Ömnögovi, Dornogovi, Töv Province
- Key people: Founder and Chairman: Byambaagiin Nyamtaishir; President and CEO: Nyamtaishiryn Tselmuun
- Brands: MAK Euro Block; MAK Euro Cement; MAK Euro Windoor; MAK Euro Venti; MAK Concrete; MAK Building Materials
- Number of employees: 4,500+
- Website: www.mak.mn

Mongolyn Alt (MAK) LLC (Mongolian: "Монголын Алт" (МАК) ХХК, lit. 'Mongolia's Gold') is a conglomerate in Mongolia that is involved in coal, and copper mining. It was founded as a private enterprise by Byambaagiin Nyamtaishir in 1993.

== Early operations ==
Since its establishment, MAK has demonstrated its ability to convert mineral reserves into profitable businesses, and has made significant contributions to the Mongolian economy and society. MAK has made efforts to promote responsible mining practices and has invested in the development of the local economy, environmental sustainability, health, and education sectors.

In recent years, MAK has diversified its operations to include processing and manufacturing businesses, utilizing advanced Europe technologies to establish factories such as the "MAK Euro Block", "MAK Euro Cement", "MAK Euro Windoor", "MAK Euro Venti", "MAK Concrete". Through these endeavors, MAK has reduced Mongolia's dependence on imports and brought innovation to the construction materials sector.

== History ==
- 1993 - MAK was established and began its business operations
- 1994 - Introduced Caterpillar machinery to Mongolia, pioneering modern mining technology in the country
- 1995 - MAK founded Bumbat LLC, a Mongolian-Canadian joint venture, and became the fourth-largest gold producer in Mongolia
- 2000 - MAK diversified its business by starting thermal coal production
- 2002 - Completed Mongolia's first-ever coal export, opening the door for future exports
- 2008 - Conducted the initial coal export via the Shiveekhuren border crossing
- 2015 - MAK Euro Block Factory was commissioned and began production.
- 2017 - MAK Euro Cement Factory was commissioned
- 2018 - The Naryn Sukhait Coal Processing Plant was commissioned
- 2019 - MAK Euro Windoor Factory was commissioned
- 2022 - MAK Euro Venti Factory was commissioned
- 2023 - MAK Concrete Factory was commissioned
- 2023 - MAK Limestone Factory was commissioned
- 2024 - Partnered with Huawei to initiate solar power plant projects to diversify energy sources
- 2024 - Began preliminary feasibility studies with Japan's Unico International for hydrogen production from coal, aiming to expand Mongolia's energy portfolio
