= Erdenet Wastewater Treatment Facility =

Wastewater treatment plant in Erdenet, Orkhon, Mongolia

- Эрдэнэт хотын бохир ус цэвэрлэх байгууламжийг
- Interactive map of the Erdenet Wastewater Treatment Facility area

General information
- Type: wastewater treatment plant
- Location: Erdenet, Orkhon, Mongolia
- Coordinates: 49°3′50″N 104°8′42″E
- Opened: 1976

The Erdenet Wastewater Treatment Facility (Mongolian: Эрдэнэт хотын бохир ус цэвэрлэх байгууламжийг) is a wastewater treatment plant in Erdenet, Orkhon Province, Mongolia.

== History ==
The plant was established in 1976. In 2010–2016, the plant underwent renovation and was upgraded.

== Technical specifications ==
The plant has a daily water processing capacity of 24,000 m^{2}.

== See also ==
- Environmental issues in Mongolia
