= Choiriin Bogd Mountain =

Mountain in Choir, Govisümber, Mongolia

- Чойрын Богд Уул

Highest point
- Elevation: 1,682 m (5,518 ft)
- Coordinates: 46°15′54.7″N 108°46′31.2″E

Geography
- Country: Mongolia
- Province: Govisümber
- District: Choir

The Choiriin Bogd Mountain (Mongolian: Чойрын Богд Уул) is a mountain in Choir, Govisümber Province, Mongolia.

== History ==
The mountain became a local administrative protection in 1997. In 2011, it became a protected nature reserve.

== Geology ==
The mountain is located at an elevation of 1,682 meters.

== See also ==
- List of mountains in Mongolia
