= List of Mongolian provinces by GDP =

This is a list of Mongolian provinces by GDP and GDP per capita. The Mongolian tögrög has been converted to the international dollar using the IMF's Purchasing Power Parity conversion rate.

== Provinces by GDP ==
The following table is the list of the provinces of Mongolia by GDP in 2022 according to data by the National Statistics Office of Mongolia.

Rank	Region	GDP in millions of MNT (Nominal)	GDP in millions of USD (PPP)	% of national GDP
1	Ulaanbaatar	45,047,096.2	30,594.6	63.15%
2	Orkhon	3,349,741.5	3,013.4	6.22%
3	Ömnögovi	3,429,099.9	2,591.4	5.35%
4	Töv	1,033,029.2	929.3	1.92%
5	Selenge	1,024,360.0	921.5	1.90%
6	Khovd	974,691.8	876.8	1.81%
7	Khövsgöl	951,539.9	856.0	1.77%
8	Dornod	943,575.3	848.8	1.75%
9	Arkhangai	864,131.9	777.4	1.60%
10	Övörkhangai	803,562.6	722.9	1.49%
11	Sükhbaatar	770,709.0	693.3	1.43%
12	Darkhan-Uul	755,747.3	679.9	1.40%
13	Khentii	729,725.9	656.5	1.36%
14	Uvs	694,271.3	624.6	1.29%
15	Bayan-Ölgii	658,648.1	592.5	1.22%
16	Dornogovi	655,731.8	589.9	1.22%
17	Zavkhan	651,636.3	586.2	1.21%
18	Bulgan	549,818.9	494.6	1.02%
19	Bayankhongor	541,283.9	486.9	1.01%
20	Govi-Altai	445,308.4	400.6	0.83%
21	Dundgovi	414,934.6	373.3	0.77%
22	Govisümber	149,543.9	134.5	0.28%
	Mongolia	53,851,544.5	48,445.1	100%

== Provinces by GDP per capita ==
The following table is the list of the provinces of Mongolia by GDP in 2022 according to data by the National Statistics Office of Mongolia.

Rank	Region	GDP per capita in MNT (Nominal)	GDP per capita in USD (PPP)	% of national average
1	Ömnögovi	39,223,310	$35,285	243.3%
2	Orkhon	31,545,390	$28,378	195.7%
3	Ulaanbaatar	21,692,300	$19,515	134.6%
4	Sükhbaatar	11,761,520	$10,581	73.0%
5	Dornod	11,151,660	$10,032	69.2%
6	Töv	11,035,220	$9,927	68.5%
7	Khovd	10,769,840	$9,689	66.8%
8	Selenge	9,450,430	$8,502	58.6%
9	Khentii	9,175,250	$8,254	56.9%
10	Dornogovi	9,112,070	$8,197	56.5%
11	Arkhangai	9,042,820	$8,135	56.1%
12	Bulgan	8,892,720	$8,000	55.2%
13	Zavkhan	8,856,280	$7,967	54.9%
14	Dundgovi	8,759,250	$7,880	54.3%
15	Govisümber	8,263,010	$7,433	51.3%
16	Uvs	8,130,020	$7,314	50.4%
17	Govi-Altai	7,612,630	$6,848	47.2%
18	Darkhan-Uul	7,222,080	$6,497	44.8%
19	Khövsgöl	6,905,270	$6,212	42.8%
20	Övörkhangai	6,857,800	$6,169	42.5%
21	Bayan-Ölgii	6,035,000	$5,429	37.4%
22	Bayankhongor	6,027,060	$5,422	37.4%
	Mongolia	16,121,030	$14,503	100%

== See also ==
- Provinces of Mongolia
- Economy of Mongolia
