= Baganuur–Choir Transmission Line =

Transmission line in Mongolia

Location
- Country: Mongolia
- From: Baganuur
- To: Choir

Technical information
- Type: transmission line
- Current type: AC
- AC voltage: 110 kV
- No. of circuits: 1

The Baganuur–Choir Transmission Line is a transmission line in Mongolia connecting Baganuur of Ulaanbaatar and Choir of Govisümber Province.

== History ==
The transmission line was constructed in the 1980s. The 220/110/35 kV Baganuur Substation was established in 1983. In 2019, the 220/110/35/6 kV Choir Substation was expanded and renovated.

== Geography ==
The elevation along the transmission line ranges from 1,280 until 1,480 meters, with the highest point located in Baganuur District and the lowest point located in Choir city.

== Technical specifications ==
The transmission line is a single circuit with a voltage rating of 110 kV. The transmission line starting point is at the 220/110/35 kV Baganuur Substation and the ending is at the 220/110/35/6 kV Choir Substation.

== See also ==
- Electricity sector in Mongolia
