= Jargalant, Orkhon =

District in Orkhon Province, Mongolia

Coordinates: 49°04′03″N 104°24′59″E

Jargalant District Жаргалант сум ᠵᠢᠷᠭᠠᠯᠠᠩᠲᠤᠰᠤᠮᠤ
- District
- Interactive map of Jargalant District
- Country: Mongolia
- Province: Orkhon Province

Area
  - Total: 635.6 km^{2} (245.4 sq mi)
- Time zone: UTC+8 (UTC + 8)
- Climate: Dwc

Jargalant (Mongolian: жаргалант, "Happiness", also Ulaantolgoi) is a sum (district) of Orkhon Province in central northern Mongolia. In 2009, its population was 3,166.

== Administrative divisions ==
The district is divided into four bags, which are:

- Dulaan-Uul
- Jargalant
- Malchin
- Ulaantolgoi
