= Shivee-Ovoo Coal Mine =

Coal mine in Shiveegovi, Govisümber, Mongolia

Shivee-Ovoo Coal Mine Шивээ-Овоо Нүүрсний Уурхай
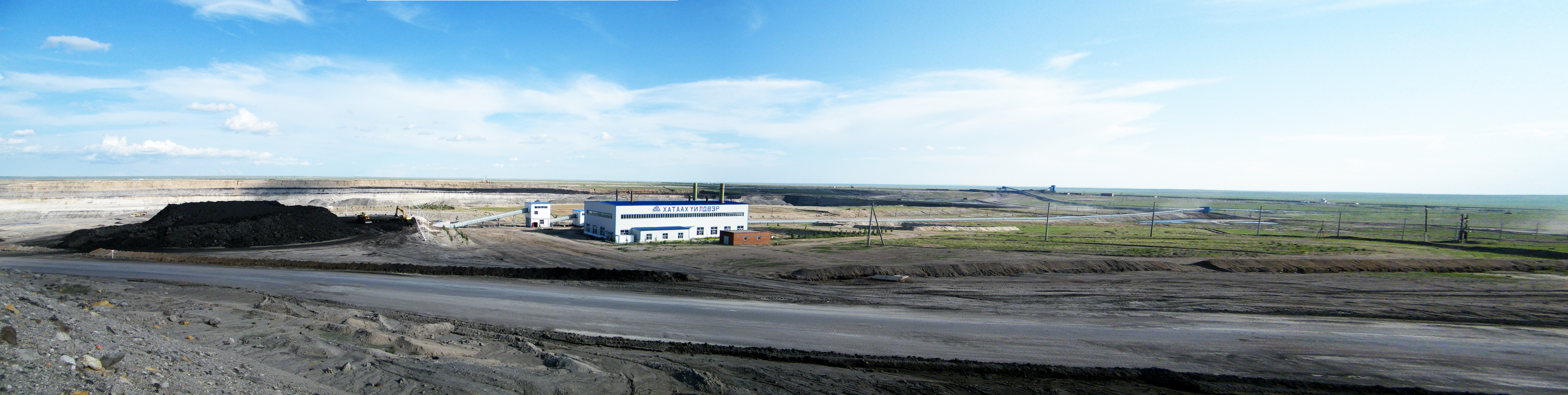

- Location within Mongolia
- Location: Shiveegovi, Govisümber, Mongolia; 46°13′57.1″N 108°32′07.6″E
- Products: coal
- Production: 1.2 million tons (2005)

The Shivee-Ovoo Coal Mine (Mongolian: Шивээ-Овоо Нүүрсний Уурхай) is a coal mine in Shiveegovi, Govisümber Province, Mongolia.

== History ==
In 2020, the mine underwent renovation.

== Geology ==
It has an estimated coal deposite of 2.8 billion tons and methane resource of 1.85 billion m^{3}. In 2005, the mine produced 1.2 million tons of coal.

== See also ==
- Mining in Mongolia
