= Shiveegovi =

District in Govisümber Province, Mongolia

Coordinates: 46°06′25″N 108°37′04″E

Shiveegovi District Шивээговь сум Shiweegowi sum ᠰᠢᠪᠡᠭᠡᠩᠭ᠋ᠣᠪᠢᠰᠤᠮᠤ
- District
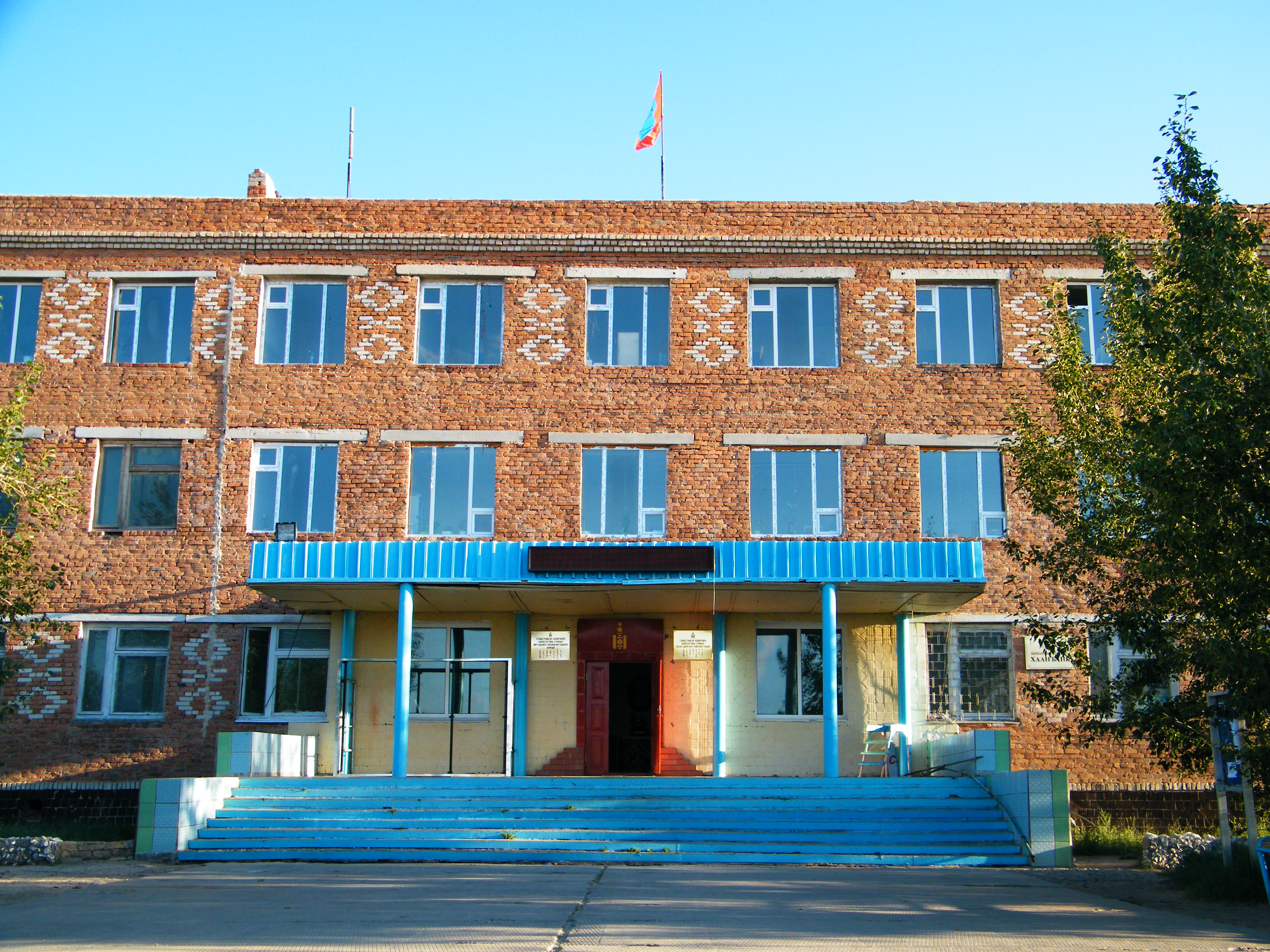

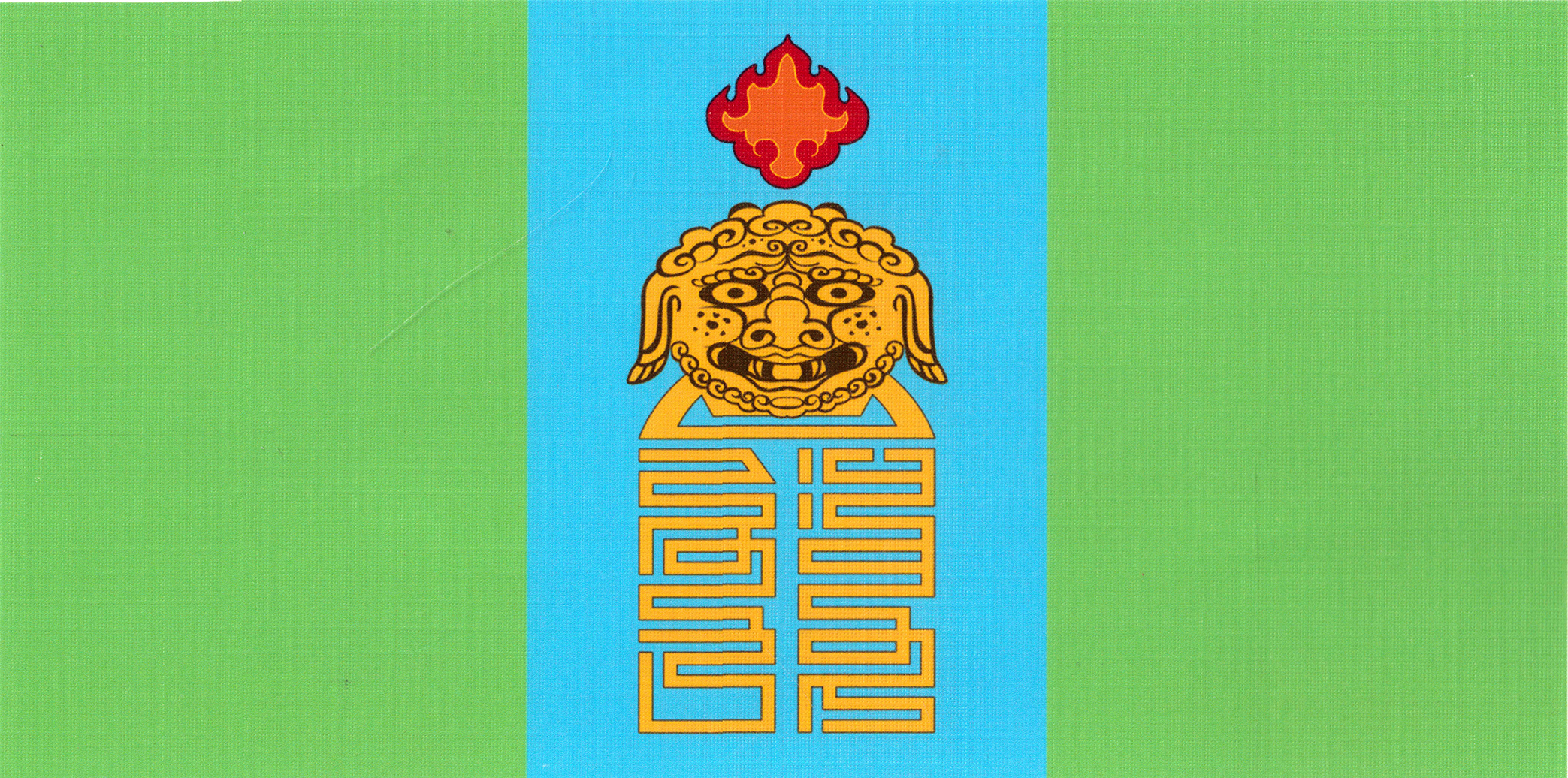
- Flag

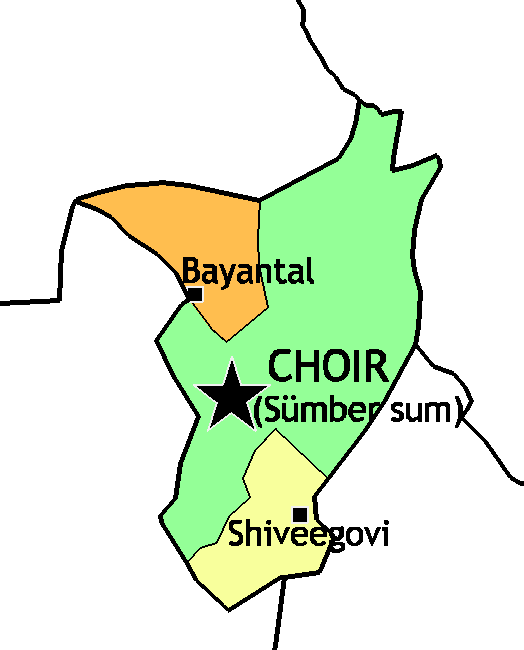

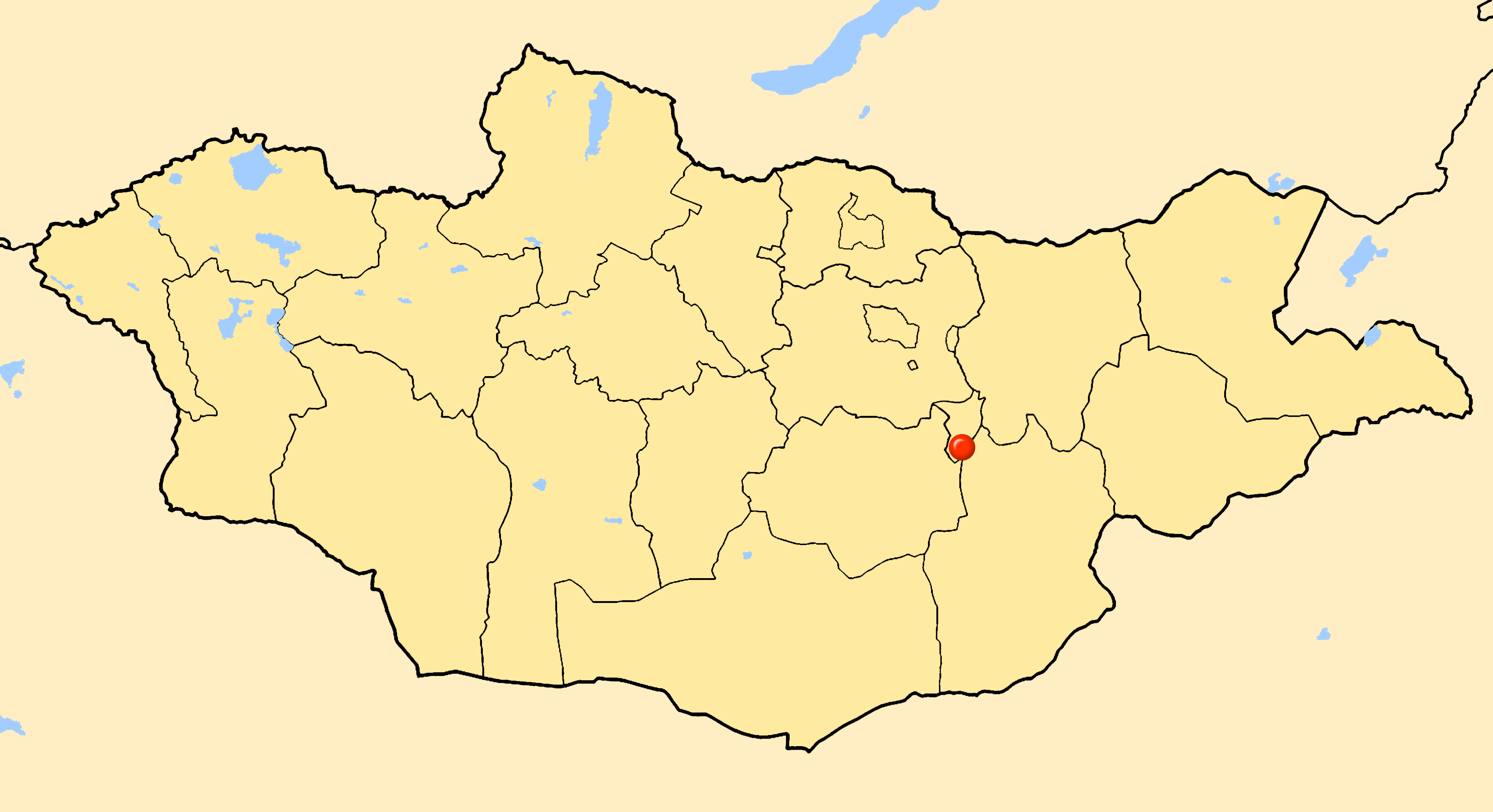
- Country: Mongolia
- Province: Govisümber Province

Area
  - Total: 857.55 km^{2} (331.10 sq mi)

Population (2011)
  - Total: ▲3,023
- Time zone: UTC+8 (UTC + 8)
- Postal code: 42031-42032
- Climate: BSk
- Website: shiveegovi.gs.gov.mn

Shiweegowi (Mongolian: Шивээговь, [ɕiˈw̜eˑɢœw̜ʲ]) is a sum (district) of Govisümber Province in central Mongolia. In 2014, its population was 3,198.

== Geography ==
Shiveegovi is the smallest district in Govisümber Province. It has a total area of 860 km^{2}.

== Economy ==
The district is home to Shivee-Ovoo Coal Mine. It also houses a coal preparation plant which was commissioned in 2019. The plant processes coal from Erdenes Tavan Tolgoi JSC.

== Transport ==
The town is served by a railway station on the Trans-Mongolian Railway.

== Gallery ==
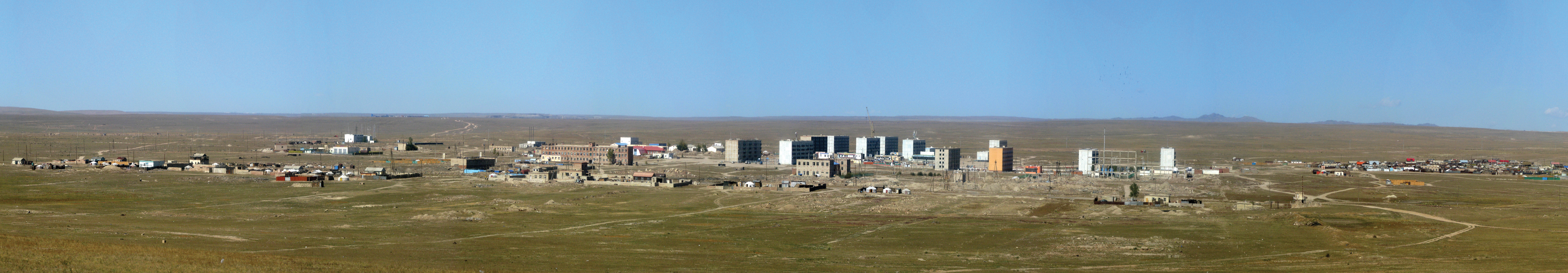
Panoramic view, 2013
