= Erdenet Mining Corporation =

Mining company in Erdenet, Mongolia

- Location in Mongolia
- Location: Erdenet, Orkhon, Mongolia; 49°01′40″N 104°02′40″E
- Products: Copper and molybdenum
- Type: State-owned enterprise
- Discovered: 1960s
- Opened: 1978
- Company: 100% - Government of Mongolia
- Website: www.erdenetmc.mn/en

Erdenet Mining Corporation (EMC) (Mongolian: "Эрдэнэт үйлдвэр" ТӨХГ, lit. 'Precious factory') is a mining corporation in Erdenet, Mongolia.

Established in 1973, the Erdenet Mining Corporation was a joint venture of the governments of the Mongolian People's Republic and the Soviet Union. With the development of the mine, the city of Erdenet, near the mine, was founded in 1976. The mine began its first operations in 1978 to extract Asia's largest deposit of copper ore and previously held title of the fourth largest copper mine in the world.

The Erdenet Mining Corporation is one of the Mongolian state-owned enterprises and accounts for a majority of Mongolia's hard currency income. Erdenet mines 22.23 million tons of ore a year, producing 126,700 tons of copper and 1954 tons of molybdenum. The mine accounts for 13.5% of Mongolia's GDP and 7% of its tax revenue. The mine employs about 8,000 people.

== History ==
The city Erdenet and its mill were built by Soviet technology with the help of Soviet specialists. The discovery of copper ore at Erdenetiyn-ovoo has its own history. According to legend, Chinese miners extracted copper there in earlier times, but during a storm, they were struck by lightning. Since then, the mountain Erdenetiyn-ovoo has been considered sacred, and the locals performed rituals to the mountain so it would allow them to climb it. This climb was forbidden to women.

Geological field studies at Erdenetiyn-ovoo began in the late 1950s. In the years 1958-59 a geological survey under the guidance of geologists for the first time examined Erdenetiyn-ovoo, but rated it as not having practical value.

In the early 1960s the Mongolian national geological organization began to actively cooperate with the geological institutions of European socialist countries, including Czechoslovakia. The first joint Czech-Mongolian geological expedition in 1962 carried out this mission in Bulgan aimag Khubsugul and in particular on Erdenetiyn-ovoo.

This expedition included a professor of geology at the University of Prague M.Kuzhvart, head of the Mongol-Czechoslovak geological expedition in Mongolia, and M.Krauter, engineer-geologist and head of geology at the Central Geological Survey of the Council of Ministers of the MPR Dugersuren. They agreed to start geological investigations at the site in 1964.

In 1963, a Erdenetiyn ovoo geological inspection team led by Soviet geologists Agamolyana and Ushakov made a geological map of 1:25000 scale of the site, and dug several pits and trenches. Their work produced an estimate for the probable reserves of copper ore of 150 million tons.

In the same year a geological expedition led by geologist Өlzy Mongolian-UTAS conducted geological work based on the report of the old established manufacturers and the laboratory that there were reserves of copper.

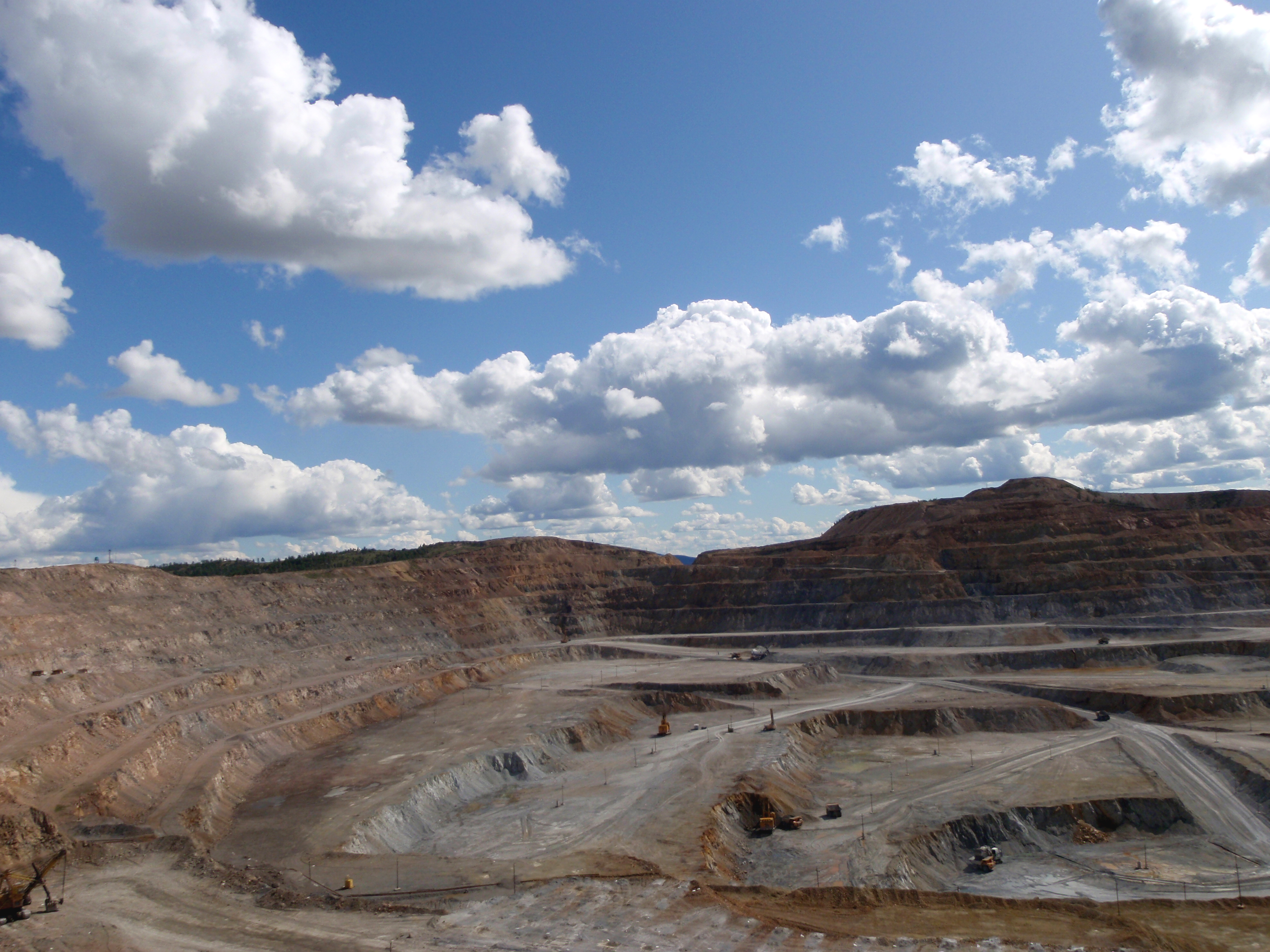
Open-pit mine of Erdenet Mining Corporation, 2009

In 1964-68 a joint Mongolian-Czechoslovak geological party at the field-Erdenetiyn ovoo conducted geological prospecting and prospect evaluation, including mid-and large-scale geological and geochemical surveying, and mining and drilling operations. These studies estimated reserves of copper-molybdenum ores at 612 million tons {C2 category).

After completion of the joint Mongolian-Czechoslovak exploration, Mongolian exploration work has continued under the direction of the party chief and chief engineer, Tumenbayara geologist G.Sanduyzhava. This party conducted preliminary exploration of the field, continued to conduct mining and drilling operations, and technological studies of copper-molybdenum ores. As a result, reserves were calculated copper ores in the amount of 670 million tons of C1 and C2.

Then a geological reconnaissance group in Bulgar aimag, headed by Soviet geologists E.I.Martovitskim and V.S.Kalininym, and Mongolian geologist Tumenbayarom, spent here a deeper intelligence work necessary for the operation of the field within 20 months. By the autumn of 1972 the estimated size of the Erdenetiyn ovoo deposit was 2,000 m long, 500-1,500 m wide and 400 m deep.

== Photos ==
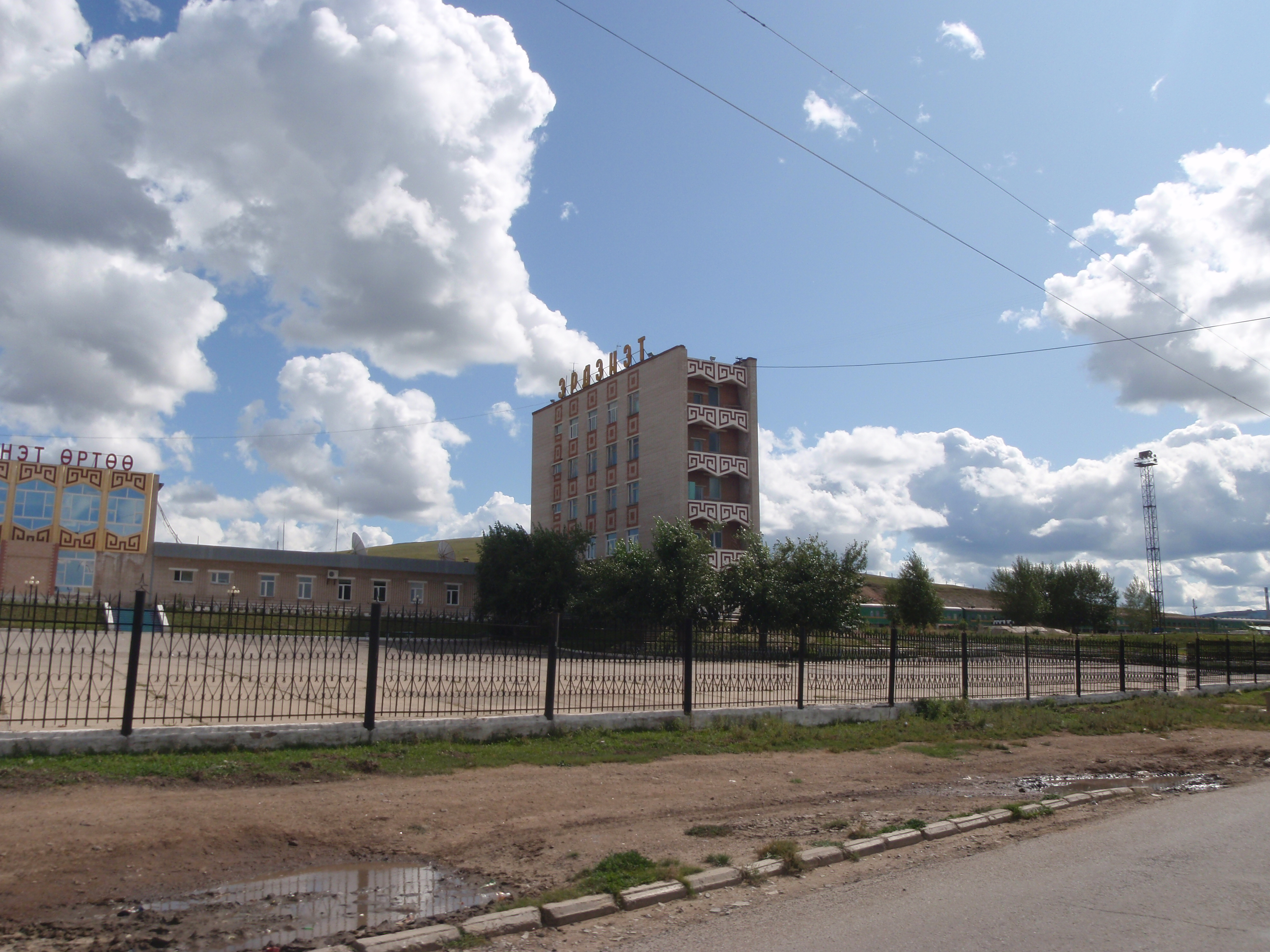
Erdenet Rail Terminal

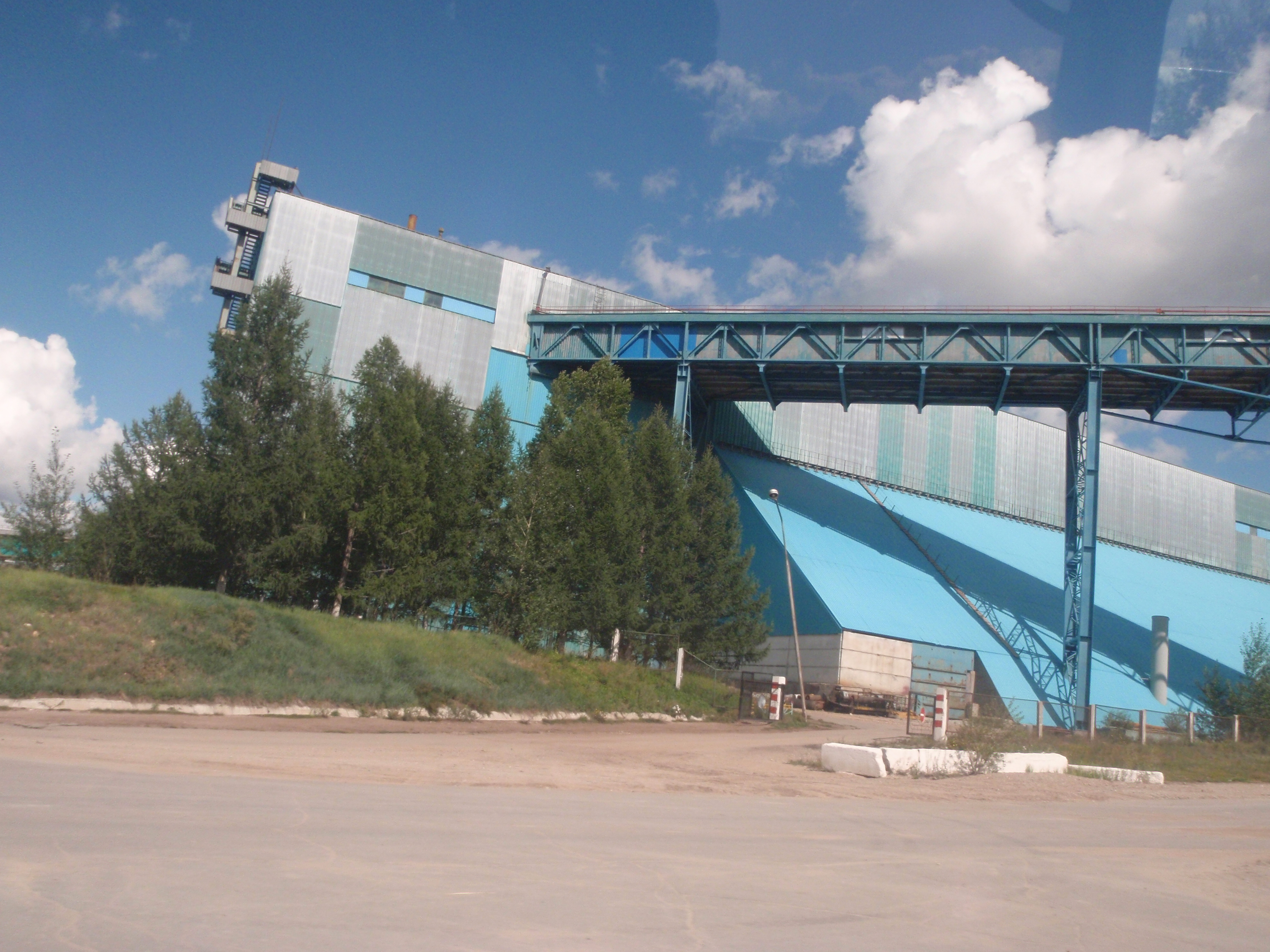
Erdenet Mining Corporation

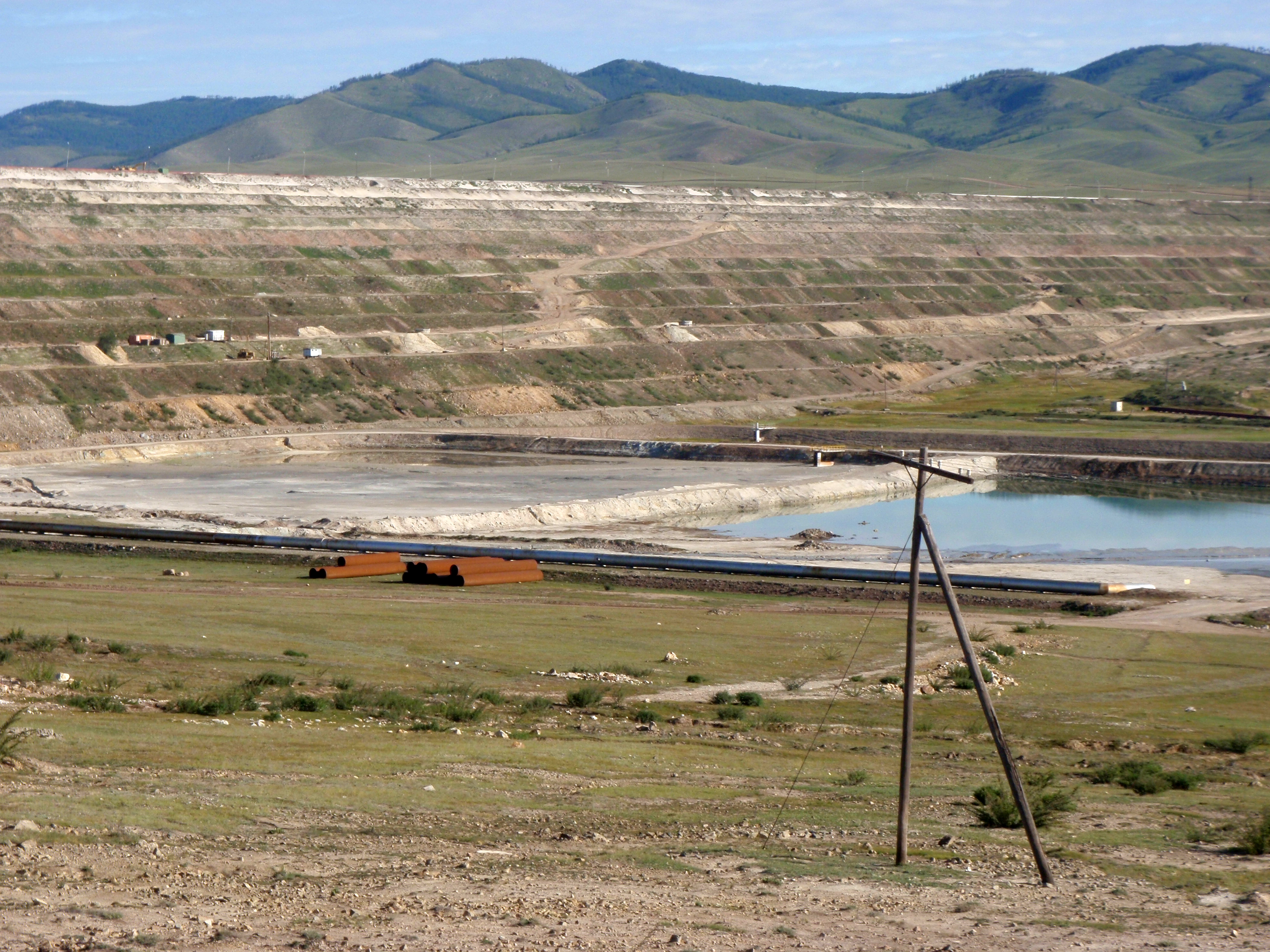
Erdenet

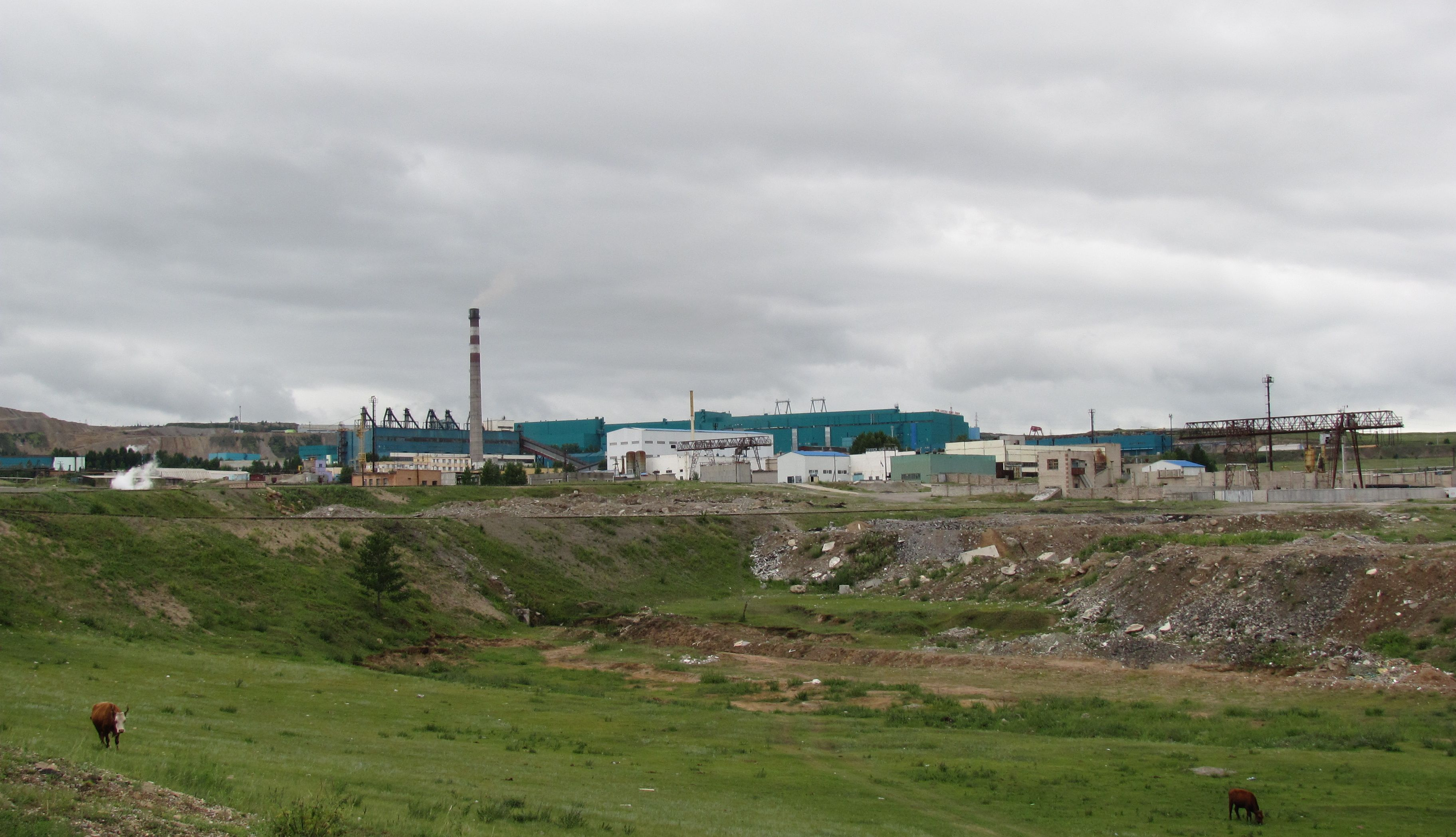
Copper mining
