= Museum of Orkhon Province =

Museum in Erdenet, Orkhon, Mongolia

- Орхон аймгийн музей
- Established: 1983
- Location: Erdenet, Orkhon, Mongolia
- Coordinates: 49°01′56.2″N 104°03′30.7″E
- Type: museum
- Collection size: 1,600

The Museum of Orkhon Province (Mongolian: Орхон аймгийн музей) is a museum in Erdenet, Orkhon Province, Mongolia.

== History ==
The museum was established in 1983.

== Exhibitions ==
The museum has a total of 1,600 exhibits. It displays various national costumes, traditional music instruments, various stone artifacts etc.

== See also ==
- List of museums in Mongolia
