= Friendship Monument =

Monument in Erdenet, Orkhon, Mongolia

- Найрамдал Өндөрлөг
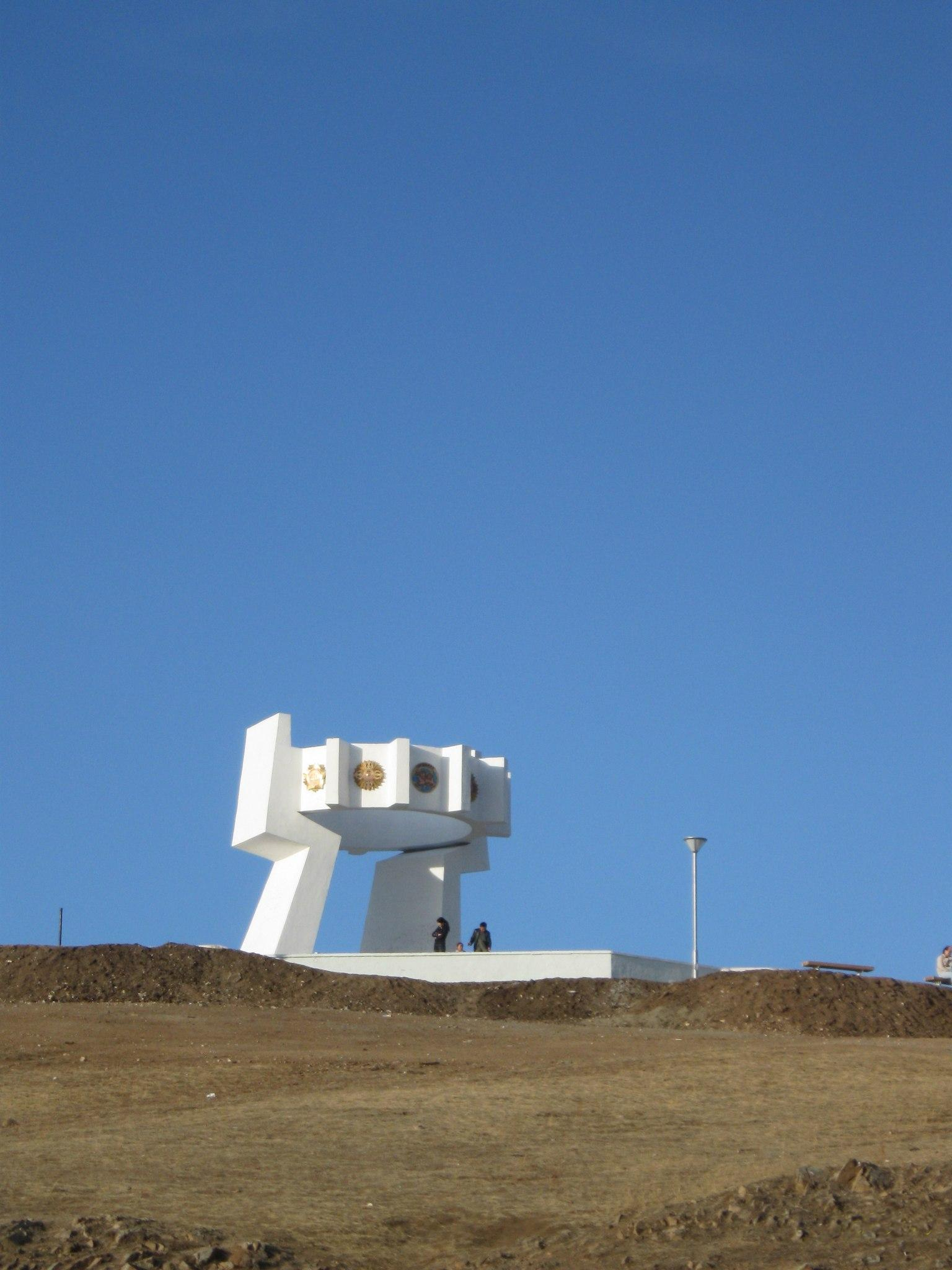
- Interactive map of the Friendship Monument area

General information
- Type: monument
- Location: Erdenet, Orkhon, Mongolia
- Coordinates: 49°02′04.6″N 104°03′39.4″E
- Opened: 1986

The Friendship Monument (Mongolian: Найрамдал Өндөрлөг) is a monument in Erdenet, Orkhon Province, Mongolia.

The monument was established in 1986 during a conference between the people of Mongolia and Soviet Union.

The monument resembles the shape of both Mongolian and Soviet women. It showcases the cooperation and planned economics of both sides.

== See also ==
- Mongolia–Russia relations
