= Uranium mining in Mongolia =

Uranium mining in Mongolia refers to the extraction of uranium in Mongolia.

== History ==
The first uranium mining in Mongolia started in the 1950s in a joint cooperation with the Soviet Union. In 2009 after a consultation with the International Atomic Energy Agency, the parliament passed the Nuclear Energy Law to regulate the mining of uranium in the country.

== Areas ==
Mongolia is classified into four uranium regions, which are Mongol-Priargun, Gobi-Tamsag, Khentei-Daur and Northern Mongolian.

== Mines ==
- Haraat mine

== See also ==
- Mining in Mongolia
