= Choir–Sainshand Transmission Line =

Transmission line in Mongolia

Choir–Sainshand Transmission Line Чойр-Сайншандын Цахилгаан Дамжуулах Aгаарын Шугам

Location
- Country: Mongolia
- From: Choir
- To: Sainshand

Construction information
- Construction started: 2025
- Expected: 2027

Technical information
- Type: transmission line
- Current type: AC
- Total length: 220 km (140 mi)
- AC voltage: 220 kV
- No. of circuits: 2

The Choir–Sainshand Transmission Line (Mongolian: Чойр-Сайншандын Цахилгаан Дамжуулах Aгаарын Шугам) is a transmission line in Mongolia connecting Choir and Sainshand.

== History ==
The construction of the transmission line is expected to start in 2025 and completed by 2027.

== Technical specifications ==
The transmission line will have a total length of 220 km with voltage level of 220 kV. It will be a double circuit line. It will also include the construction of substations in both towns.

== Finance ==
The construction of the transmission line will be financed by funds from the European Union, European Bank for Reconstruction and Development and various donors with a total amount of EUR79.67 million.

== See also ==
- Electricity sector in Mongolia
