= Bayantal =

Bayantal, Bayantala, or Bayan Tala (Mongolian: Баян-Тал, Mongolian: rich steppe) may refer to:

== Mongolia ==
- Bayantal, Govisümber, a sum (district) in Govisümber Aimags (province)

== China ==
- several Towns, Townships and Sums in different Banners (counties), Inner Mongolia
  - Bayantala, Horqin
  - Bayantala, Xianghuang
  - Bayantala, Qahar
  - Bayantala, Ewenki
  - Bayantala, Jarud
  - Bayantala, Bairin
  - Bayantala, New Barag
  - Bayantala, Naiman
  - Bayantala, Huade

== Other places ==
- Bayantala Railway Station, in Bayantala Farm, Huade County, Ulanqab, Inner Mongolia

== Russia ==
- Bayan-Tala, Tuva, a ulus in Dzun-Khemchiksky District, Tuva
