= Choir Depression =

Depression near Choir, Mongolia

- Depression
- Coordinates: 46°22′N 108°22′E

The Choir Depression is a depression near Choir, Mongolia. It is about 150 km long and 10 to 20 km wide, about 500 m lower than the surrounding upland. It lies at an altitude of 1269 m.

== Uranium mines ==
Uranium prospecting began in the Choir Depression in 1955, and the Haraat deposit (of uranium trioxide), identified in 1970, began major drilling in 1988. Following new discoveries in 1997, there is estimated to be 8165 t (18 million lbs.) of uranium trioxide in the depression. In early 1994, the area was licensed to the Gurvan Saihan Joint Venture, with a 70% interest by Denison Mines, and 15% each from the Mongolian government and a Russian state geological concern. Rail lines connect the Trans-Mongolian Railway with the mine.
