= Bayantal, Govisümber =

District in Govisümber Province, Mongolia

Bayantal District Mongolian: Баянтал сум ᠪᠠᠶ᠋ᠠᠨᠲᠠᠯ᠎ᠠᠰᠤᠮᠤ
- District
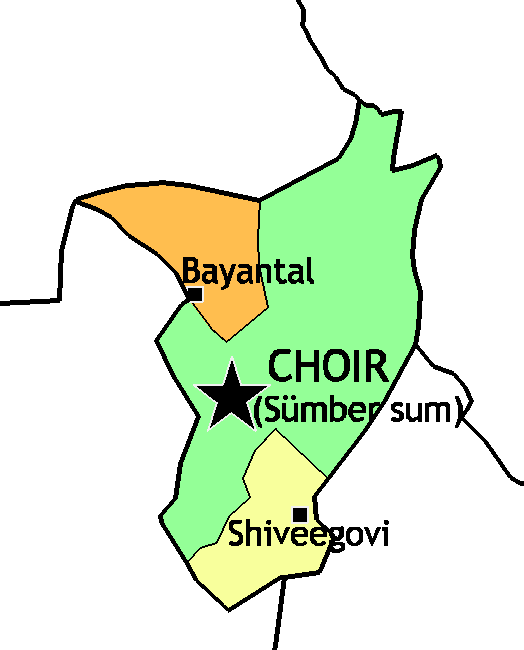
- Bayantal District in Govisümber Province

- Location in Mongolia
- Coordinates: 46°33′36″N 108°18′19″E
- Country: Mongolia
- Province: Govisümber

Area
  - Total: 916.06 km^{2} (353.69 sq mi)

Population (2014)
  - Total: 1,084
- Time zone: UTC+8 (UTC+8)
- Climate: BSk

Bayantal (Mongolian: Баянтал, rich steppe) is a sum of Govisümber Province in central Mongolia. In 2014, its population was 1,084.

== Transport ==
The town is served by a railway station on the Trans-Mongolian Railway.
