= Haraat mine =

Uranium mine in Mongolia

- Location: Mongolia
- Products: uranium

The Haraat mine is a large open pit mine located in the central part of Mongolia. Haraat represents one of the largest uranium reserves in Mongolia having estimated reserves of 227 million tonnes of ore grading 0.01% uranium.
