= Choir, Mongolia =

Capital of Govisümber Province, Mongolia

Choir Чойр ᠴᠣᠶᠢᠷ
- District
- Sümber District; Сүмбэр сум ᠰᠦᠮᠪᠦᠷᠰᠤᠮᠤ
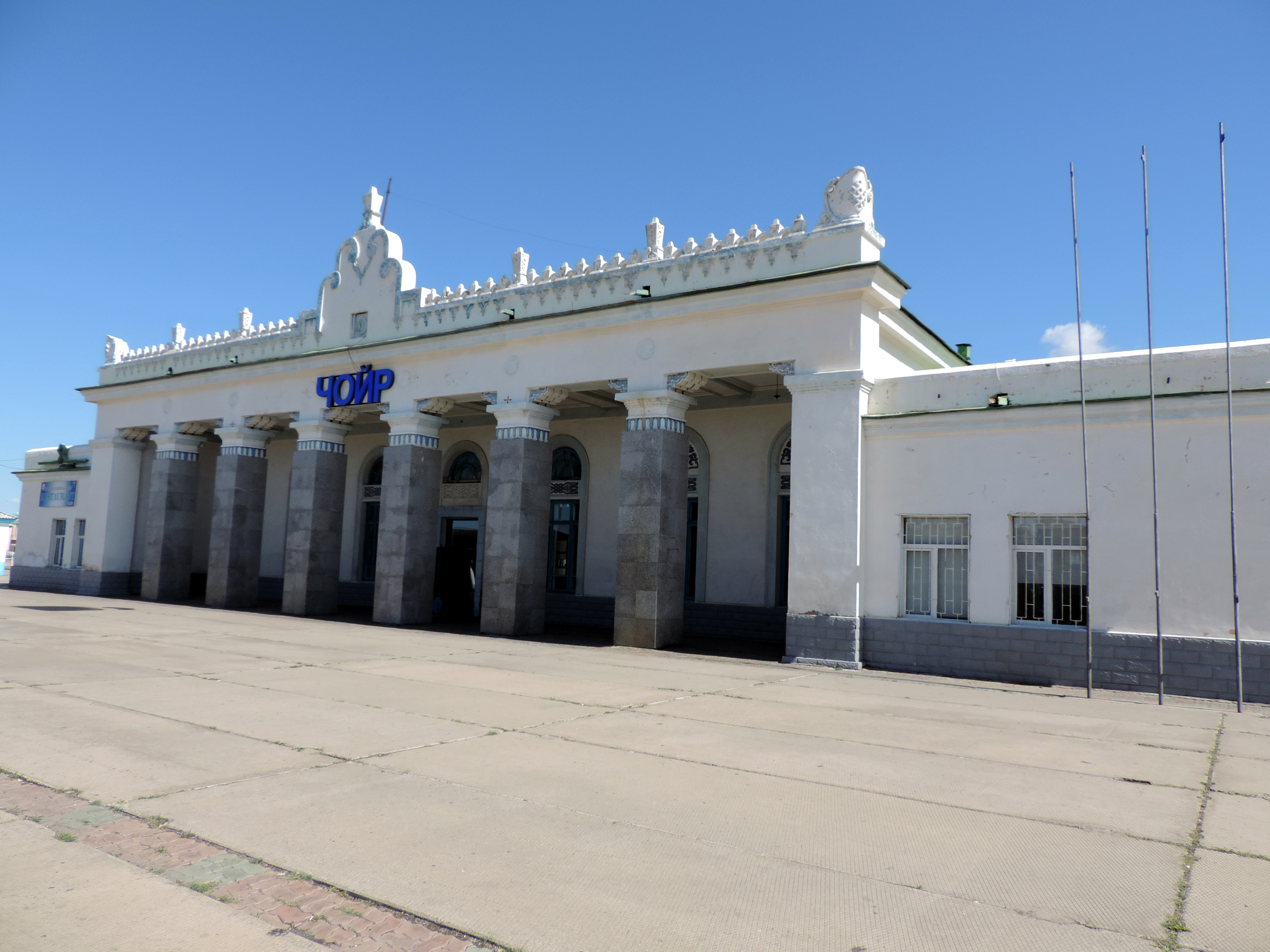
- Train station of Choir, Mongolia, 2013

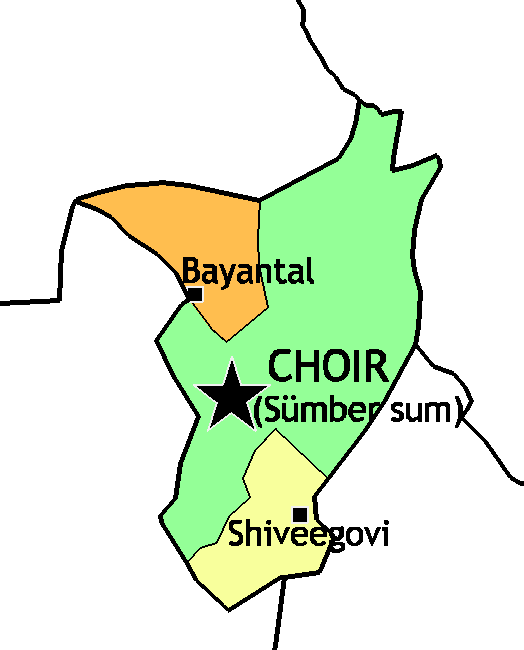

- Location in Mongolia
- Coordinates: 46°21′38″N 108°21′54″E
- Country: Mongolia
- Province: Govisümber
- Sum: Sümber

Area
  - Total: 916 km^{2} (354 sq mi)
- Elevation: 1,279 m (4,196 ft)

Population (2017)
  - Total: 10,434
  - Density: 11.4/km^{2} (29.5/sq mi)
- Time zone: UTC+8
- Area code: (+976) 154
- Climate: BSk

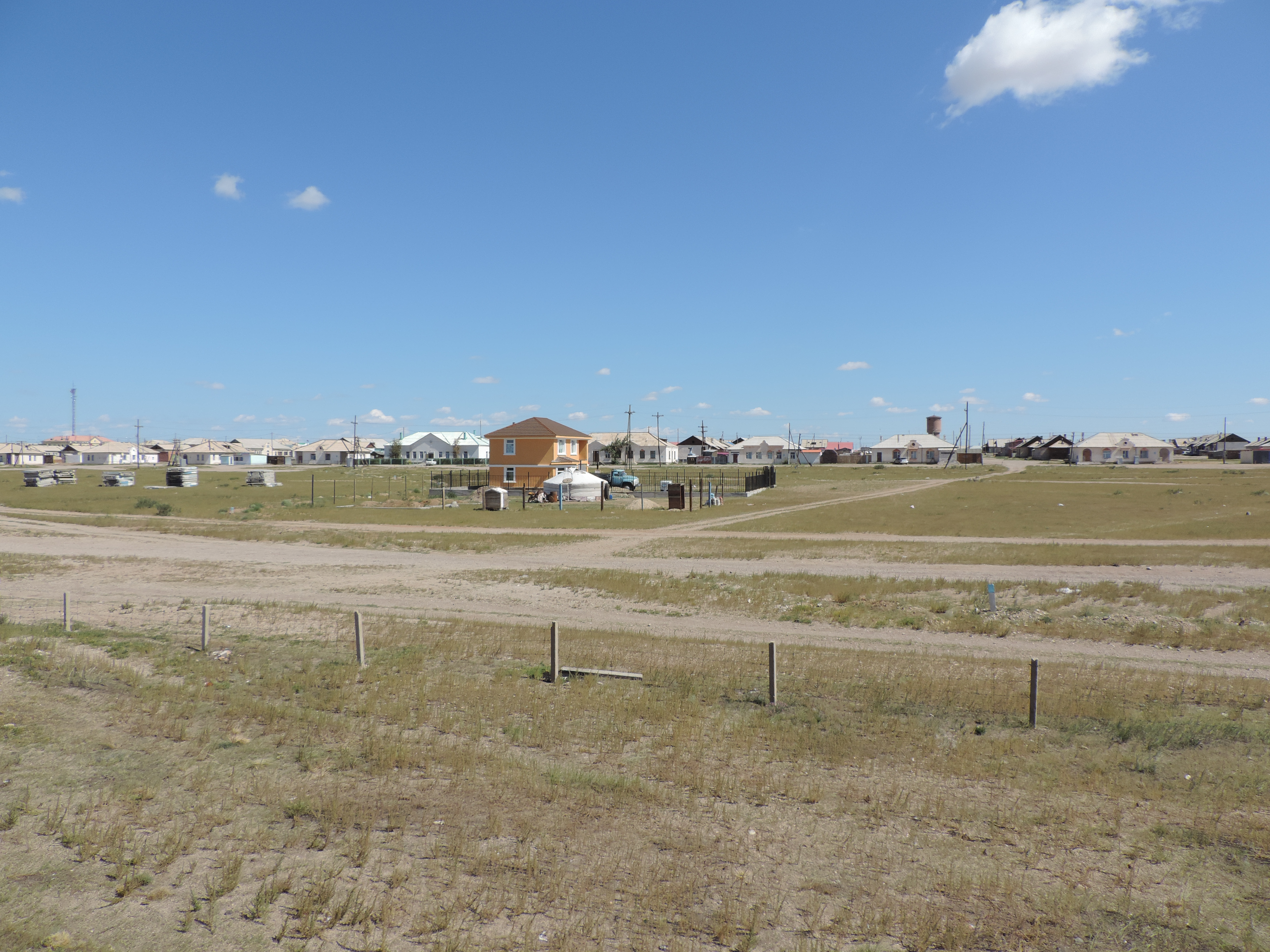
Generic view of Choir

Choir (/ˈtʃɔɪr/; Mongolian: Чойр, [ˈt͡ɕœe̯r]) is a city in east-central Mongolia. It is the capital of Govisümber Province. Choir is officially known as Sümber sum.

== History ==
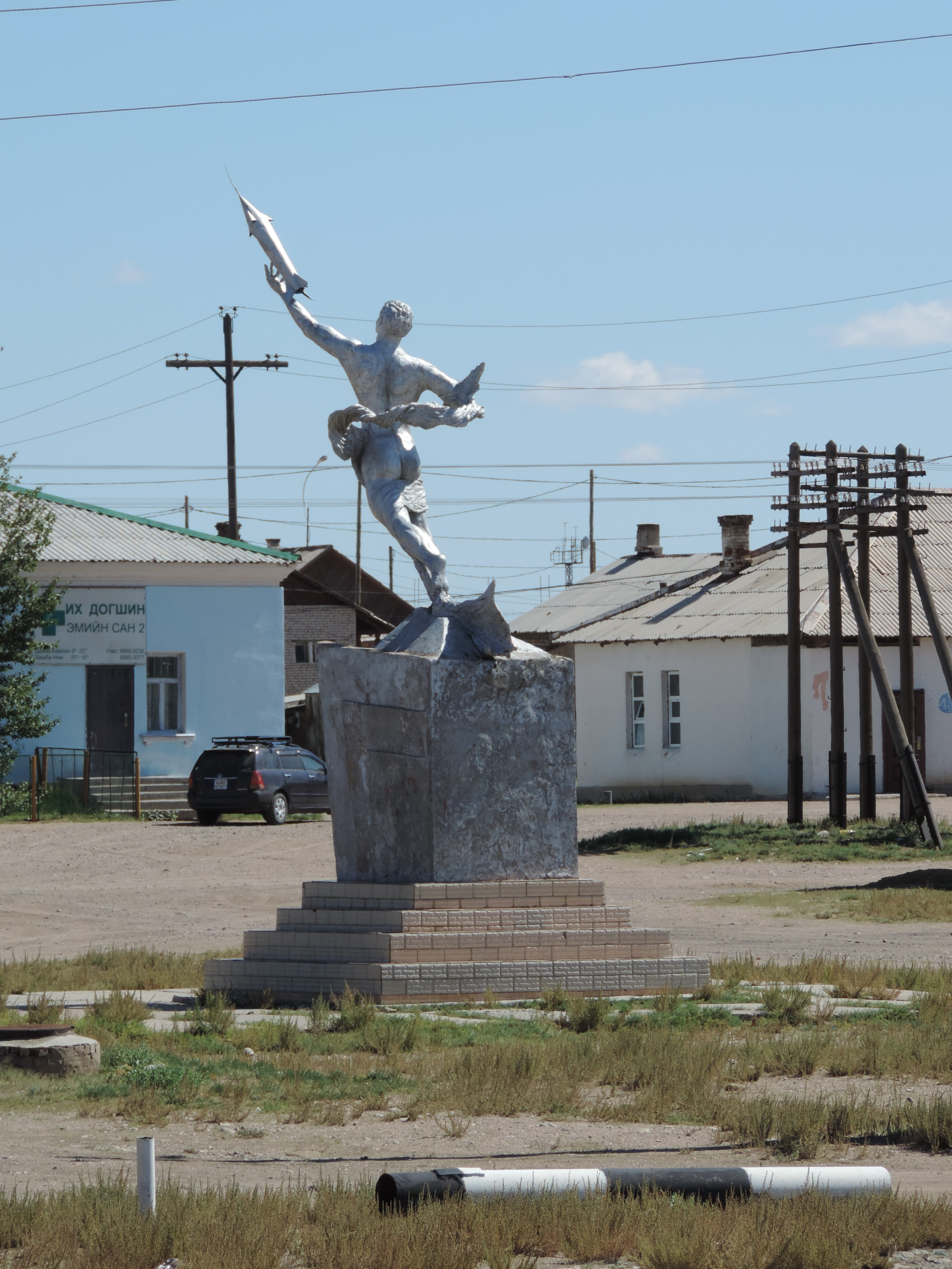
A sculpture commemorating the first Mongolian cosmonaut, Jügderdemidiin Gürragchaa, in Choir

Choir was a military base during the Soviet period. In 1989, the Soviet anti-aircraft missile units left Choir. The longest runway in Mongolia, now abandoned, is located 25 km N from Choir, a relic of that period. In 1992, the military cantonment passed into the jurisdiction of Govisümber Province, according to the 1992 constitution. Near the railway station is a statue commemorating Mongolia's first cosmonaut, Jügderdemidiin Gürragchaa.

== Geography ==
=== Location ===
Choir lies in the Choir Depression, a lowland strip about 150 km long and 10 to 20 km wide, about 500 m lower than the surrounding upland. It lies at an altitude of 1269 m.

=== Climate ===
Choir has a semi-arid climate (Köppen climate classification BSk) with warm summers and severely cold winters. Most precipitation falls in the summer as rain, with some snow in the adjacent months of May and September. Winters are very dry.

Climate data for Choir, elevation 1,286 m (4,219 ft), (1991–2020 normals, extremes 1961–present)
Month	Jan	Feb	Mar	Apr	May	Jun	Jul	Aug	Sep	Oct	Nov	Dec	Year
Record high °C (°F)	0.5 (32.9)	9.8 (49.6)	24.0 (75.2)	29.6 (85.3)	36.0 (96.8)	39.9 (103.8)	39.6 (103.3)	40.5 (104.9)	31.5 (88.7)	25.8 (78.4)	12.8 (55.0)	7.8 (46.0)	40.5 (104.9)
Mean daily maximum °C (°F)	−13.4 (7.9)	−8.3 (17.1)	2.3 (36.1)	12.0 (53.6)	19.3 (66.7)	25.2 (77.4)	27.5 (81.5)	25.4 (77.7)	19.1 (66.4)	9.6 (49.3)	−3.0 (26.6)	−12.4 (9.7)	8.6 (47.5)
Daily mean °C (°F)	−19.2 (−2.6)	−15.0 (5.0)	−5.1 (22.8)	4.6 (40.3)	11.9 (53.4)	18.5 (65.3)	21.1 (70.0)	18.8 (65.8)	12.5 (54.5)	2.5 (36.5)	−9.2 (15.4)	−17.7 (0.1)	2.0 (35.5)
Mean daily minimum °C (°F)	−23.8 (−10.8)	−21.0 (−5.8)	−11.8 (10.8)	−2.4 (27.7)	4.6 (40.3)	12.0 (53.6)	15.1 (59.2)	13.1 (55.6)	5.9 (42.6)	−3.0 (26.6)	−14.2 (6.4)	−22.1 (−7.8)	−4.0 (24.9)
Record low °C (°F)	−39.5 (−39.1)	−38.0 (−36.4)	−34 (−29)	−22.0 (−7.6)	−14.9 (5.2)	−2.5 (27.5)	−2.2 (28.0)	−1.7 (28.9)	−9.6 (14.7)	−22.3 (−8.1)	−31.6 (−24.9)	−36.2 (−33.2)	−39.5 (−39.1)
Average precipitation mm (inches)	0.9 (0.04)	1.5 (0.06)	1.9 (0.07)	3.8 (0.15)	8.0 (0.31)	24.8 (0.98)	47.0 (1.85)	34.6 (1.36)	14.8 (0.58)	4.5 (0.18)	2.5 (0.10)	1.9 (0.07)	146.4 (5.76)
Average precipitation days (≥ 1.0 mm)	1.1	1.5	1.3	3.1	2.1	4.3	6.8	6.1	2.7	1.7	2.2	1.4	34.2
Average relative humidity (%)	78.9	72.1	55.9	43.0	41.1	47.7	54.1	55.9	50.5	53.7	67.1	77.5	58.1
Average dew point °C (°F)	−22.9 (−9.2)	−19.3 (−2.7)	−14.0 (6.8)	−8.8 (16.2)	−2.5 (27.5)	5.5 (41.9)	9.9 (49.8)	8.3 (46.9)	0.8 (33.4)	−7.1 (19.2)	−14.9 (5.2)	−21.0 (−5.8)	−7.2 (19.1)
Source 1: NOAA Starlings Roost Weather
Source 2: Meteo Climat (record highs and lows)

== Population ==
In 2002, a population of Choir city was 7,588 (and 9,207 with rural parts of Sümber sum), up from a population of 4,500 in 1979. For the end of 2006 estimations population was 7,998.

== Economy ==
Choir has been declared a free enterprise zone. Along with Darkhan and Erdenet, it is one of three autonomous cities in Mongolia. Choir has a medium-security prison which can house 460 prisoners.

== Transport ==
It lies along the Trans-Mongolian Railway, 250 km to the southeast of Ulaanbaatar. The Asian Development Bank is considering a 430-km paved road from Choir to the Chinese border, the final stage of a north-south route through the country.
