= Erdenet =

Provincial capital of Orkhon Province, Mongolia

Erdenet Эрдэнэт (Mongolian) ᠡᠷᠳᠡᠨᠢᠲᠦ
- District
- Bayan-Öndör District; Баян-Өндөр сум ᠪᠠᠶ᠋ᠠᠨᠥᠨᠳᠦᠷᠰᠤᠮᠤ
- View of Erdenet

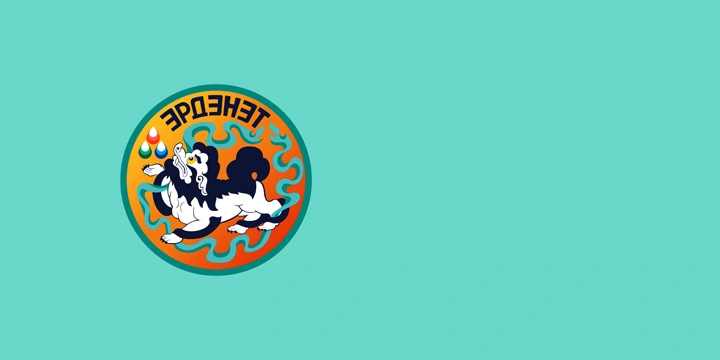
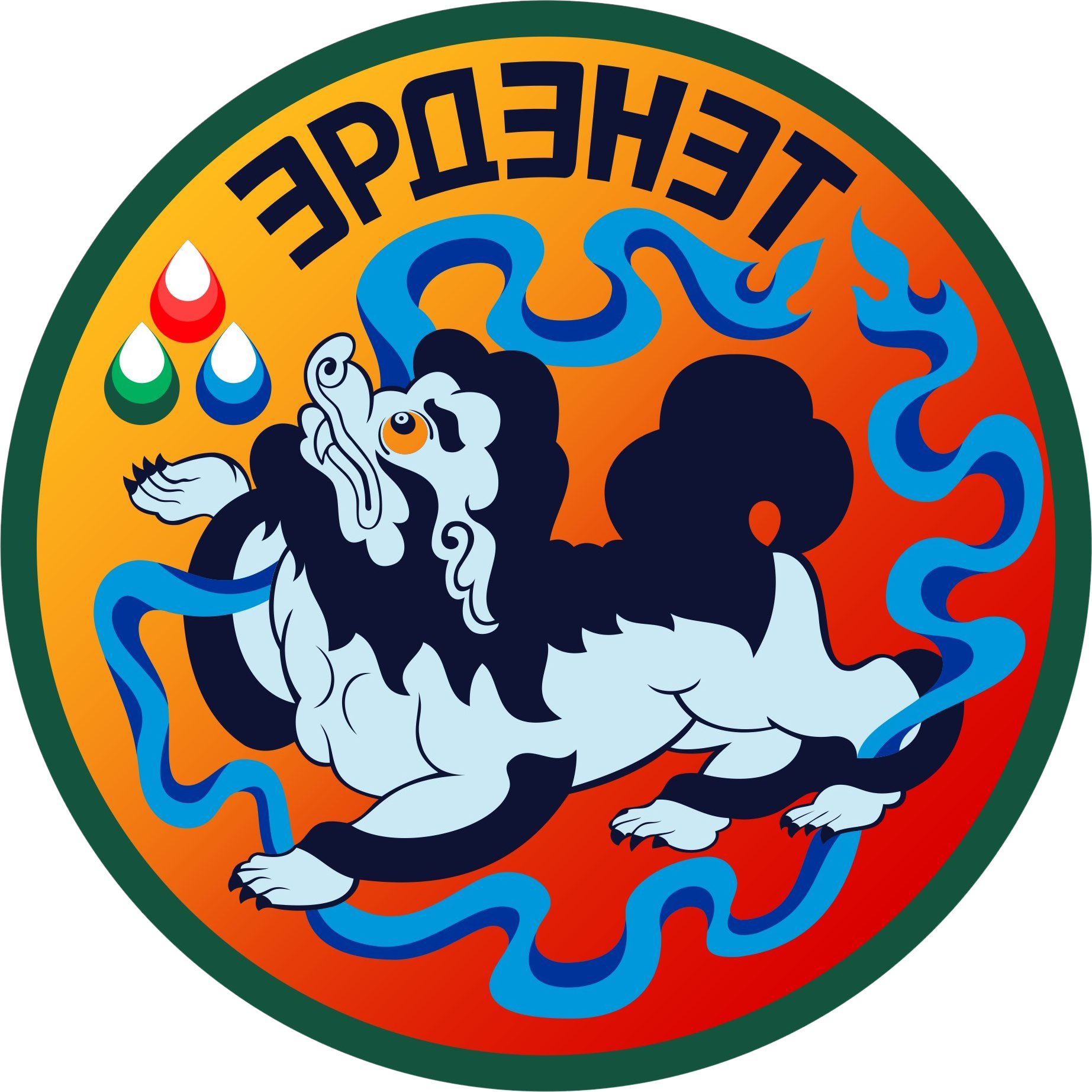
- Flag Seal

- Location within Mongolia
- Coordinates: 49°01′40″N 104°02′40″E
- Country: Mongolia
- Province: Orkhon Province
- Founded: 1974
- City status: January 1976

Government
  - Body: Citizens' Representatives Khural of Bayan-Öndör District

Area
  - Total: 208.0 km^{2} (80.3 sq mi)
- Elevation: 1,280 m (4,200 ft)

Population (2026)
  - Total: 112,520
  - Density: 541.0/km^{2} (1,401/sq mi)
- Time zone: UTC+8 (Mongolian Standard Time)
- Area code: +976 7035 (7039)
- Vehicle registration: OP_ ( _ variable)
- Climate: Dwc
- Website: www.erdenet.mn

Erdenet (/ˈɜːrdɪnɛt/; Mongolian: Эрдэнэт [ért(ɘ)nɘtʰ], 'precious, valuable') is the provincial capital of Orkhon and the second-largest city in Mongolia. Located in northern Mongolia, it lies in a valley between the Selenge and Orkhon rivers about 240 km (149 mi) (as the crow flies) northwest of the national capital Ulaanbaatar and the third-largest city Darkhan. The road length between Ulaanbaatar and Erdenet is about 370 km (230 mi). As of the 2026 census, the city had a population of 112,520.

The city has been a major industrial centre since its status as a city in 1976. The Erdenet Mining Corporation, one of the country's key mines, was founded in the 1970s as a joint venture by Mongolia and the Soviet Union. Other major industries situated in the city include timber processing, carpet, cashmere, and food production.

== History ==
Erdenet, one of the youngest settlements in Mongolia, was founded in 1974 in an area where large deposits of copper had been discovered in the 1950s. The settlement was founded as Erdenet khoroo under the jurisdiction of Bulgan Province.

Efforts to extract the copper deposit were made between the governments of the Mongolian People's Republic and the Soviet Union in the 1970s. An agreement to establish the Erdenet mine, a joint Mongolian-Soviet venture (50:50), was made in 1973. Consequently, a period of construction and development began in 1974, after the area was designated its own subdivision. The rise in population and settlementation led to the khoroo to be reorganized as a proper city in January 1976.

A single-track railway line with a length of 120 km (75 mi) linking Erdenet to the Trans-Mongolian Railway was inaugurated in 1977. With the completation of necessary infrastructure, the Erdenet mine began its first operations in 1978. In the middle of the 1980s, more than 50% of the inhabitants were Soviet citizens working as engineers or miners. A total of 25,000 Soviet nationals were located within Bulgan and neighbouring provinces of Arkhangai and Khövsgöl in the 1980s. In addition to Soviet specialists, Soviet troops of the 149th Motor Rifle Division from the 39th Army were also stationed in Erdenet.

However, after the fall of communism in 1990 and the breakdown of the USSR in 1991, the population of Russians began to steadily decrease while Soviet troops began to withdraw from the country between 1989 and 1992. By the end of the 1990s, only about 1,000 Russian citizens were reported to be working at Erdenet mine.

The city became part of the newly established Orkhon Province following the administrative reforms by the state in 1994.

=== Erdenet Mining Corporation ===
The Erdenet Mining Corporation (EMC), former joint Mongolian-Russian venture, accounts for a majority of Mongolia's hard currency income. Erdenet mines 22.23 million tons of ore per year, producing 126,700 tons of copper and 1,954 tons of molybdenum. In 2006, the mine accounted for 13.5% of Mongolia's GDP and 7% of tax revenue. It was reported about 8,000 people were employed by the EMC in 2008. With the purchase of the Russian 49% stake in 2016, the mine became fully owned by Mongolia. In 2025, the EMC produced 582.5 thousand tons of copper concentrate and 5.5 thousand tons of molybdenum concentrate.

== Transport ==
Welcome road sign in Erdenet city

Erdenet is linked to Ulaanbaatar, the capital city, and to the cities of Darkhan and Bulgan by a paved road and is easily accessible by bus several times each day. The distance to the capital where the nearest airport is situated amounts to 370 km (230 mi) and travel by car takes about eight hours.

Since 1977, the city has been linked to the Trans-Mongolian Railway which connects Ulaanbaatar and other major settlements to Russia and China.

== Landmarks ==
Erdenet is home to several cultural and economic landmarks. The Erdenet Carpet Factory, established in 1981 about 2 km (1 mi) east of the city center, processes approximately 2,000 tons of wool annually and employs around 1,100 workers.

Statue of Buddha (Ikh Shuteen Tsogtsolbor) in northeastern Erdenet

Cultural institutions include the Mining Museum, located in the Palace of Culture on the central square, and the Museum of Orkhon Province, founded in 1983. The city has over 20 different socialist murals, statues, and landmarks, most notable one being the Friendship Monument. The monument, erected in 1984, stands on a hill in northeastern Erdenet and showcases the ties between Mongolia and Russia. Amarbayasgalant Monastery, a major Buddhist site located about 60 km (37 mi) northeast of Erdenet, was founded between 1727 and 1737, partially destroyed in 1937, and restored after 1975 with support from UNESCO.

== Population ==
Erdenet population
1975 est.	1979 census	1981 est.	1985 est.	1989 census	1994 est.	2000 census	2003 est.	2004 est.	2005 est.	2006 est.	2007 est.	2008 est.
4,100	31,900	38,700	45,400	56,100	63,000	68,310	78,882	80,858	81,249	83,160	85,121	86,866

== Administrative divisions ==
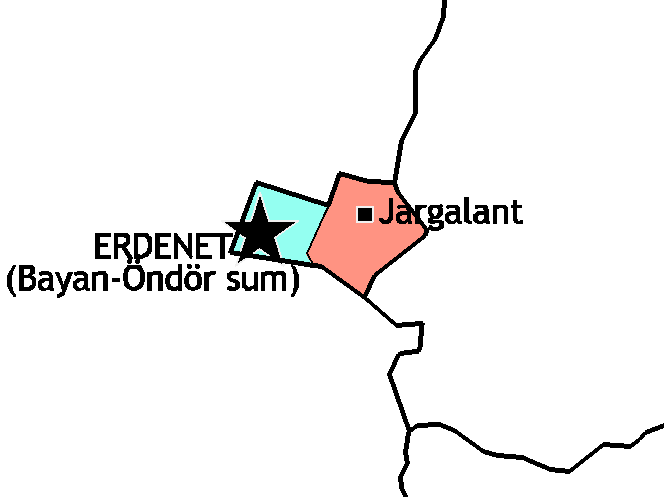
Map of the districts of Orkhon Province

Bayan-Öndör District consists of 26 sub-districts ("bag").

- Bayanbulag (Баянбулаг)
- Bayantsagaan (Баянцагаан)
- Bayan-Ovoot (Баян-Овоот)
- Bulag (Булаг)
- Bürenbüst (Бүрэнбүст)
- Chandmani (Чандмань)
- Chingel (Чингэл)
- Davaat (Даваат)
- Denj (Дэнж)
- Erdene (Эрдэнэ)
- Govil (Говил)
- Ikh Zaluu (Их залуу)
- Khürenbulag (Хүрэнбулаг)
- Malchin (Малчин)
- Naran (Наран)
- Nayramdal (Найрамдал)
- Ouut (Оюут)
- Rashaant (Рашаант)
- Shand (Шанд)
- Sogoot (Согоот)
- Tsagannchuluut (Цагаанчулуут)
- Urtbulag (Уртбулаг)
- Urtyn gol (Уртын гол)
- Uurkhaychin (Уурхайчин)
- Yarguyt (Яргуйт)
- Zest (Зэст)

== Climate ==
Erdenet has a cold semi-arid climate (Köppen climate classification: BSk). Summers are typically warm and rainy with cool nights, while winters are long, very cold, and dry.

Climate data for Bulgan (Note: Bulgan is located approximately 40 kilometres (24.9 mi) south-west of Erdenet.), elevation 1,219 m (3,999 ft), (1991–2020, extremes 1941–present)
Month	Jan	Feb	Mar	Apr	May	Jun	Jul	Aug	Sep	Oct	Nov	Dec	Year
Record high °C (°F)	6.0 (42.8)	12.0 (53.6)	21.0 (69.8)	31.4 (88.5)	36.0 (96.8)	36.2 (97.2)	38.3 (100.9)	35.3 (95.5)	30.5 (86.9)	24.4 (75.9)	16.2 (61.2)	10.9 (51.6)	38.3 (100.9)
Mean daily maximum °C (°F)	−13.2 (8.2)	−7.9 (17.8)	1.7 (35.1)	11.5 (52.7)	18.5 (65.3)	23.3 (73.9)	24.5 (76.1)	22.5 (72.5)	17.1 (62.8)	8.7 (47.7)	−3.2 (26.2)	−11.3 (11.7)	7.7 (45.8)
Daily mean °C (°F)	−20.8 (−5.4)	−16.9 (1.6)	−7.3 (18.9)	3.0 (37.4)	9.8 (49.6)	15.5 (59.9)	17.7 (63.9)	15.2 (59.4)	8.5 (47.3)	−0.1 (31.8)	−10.7 (12.7)	−18.3 (−0.9)	−0.4 (31.4)
Mean daily minimum °C (°F)	−26.4 (−15.5)	−23.8 (−10.8)	−14.9 (5.2)	−4.9 (23.2)	1.1 (34.0)	7.8 (46.0)	11.2 (52.2)	8.7 (47.7)	1.2 (34.2)	−6.8 (19.8)	−16.7 (1.9)	−23.7 (−10.7)	−7.3 (18.9)
Record low °C (°F)	−41.6 (−42.9)	−40.2 (−40.4)	−35.2 (−31.4)	−22.2 (−8.0)	−12.8 (9.0)	−8.9 (16.0)	0.0 (32.0)	−3.0 (26.6)	−14.6 (5.7)	−28.2 (−18.8)	−38.5 (−37.3)	−39.3 (−38.7)	−41.6 (−42.9)
Average precipitation mm (inches)	2 (0.1)	2 (0.1)	5 (0.2)	13 (0.5)	21 (0.8)	57 (2.2)	97 (3.8)	66 (2.6)	28 (1.1)	8 (0.3)	5 (0.2)	2 (0.1)	306 (12)
Average precipitation days (≥ 1.0 mm)	1.1	1.5	2.0	2.7	4.1	8.2	11.4	9.4	4.5	2.5	1.9	1.5	50.7
Average relative humidity (%)	75.4	72.5	66.2	55.6	54.4	63.0	71.6	73.9	68.7	68.5	73.5	76.1	68.3
Source 1: Pogoda.ru.net
Source 2: NOAA

== Gallery ==
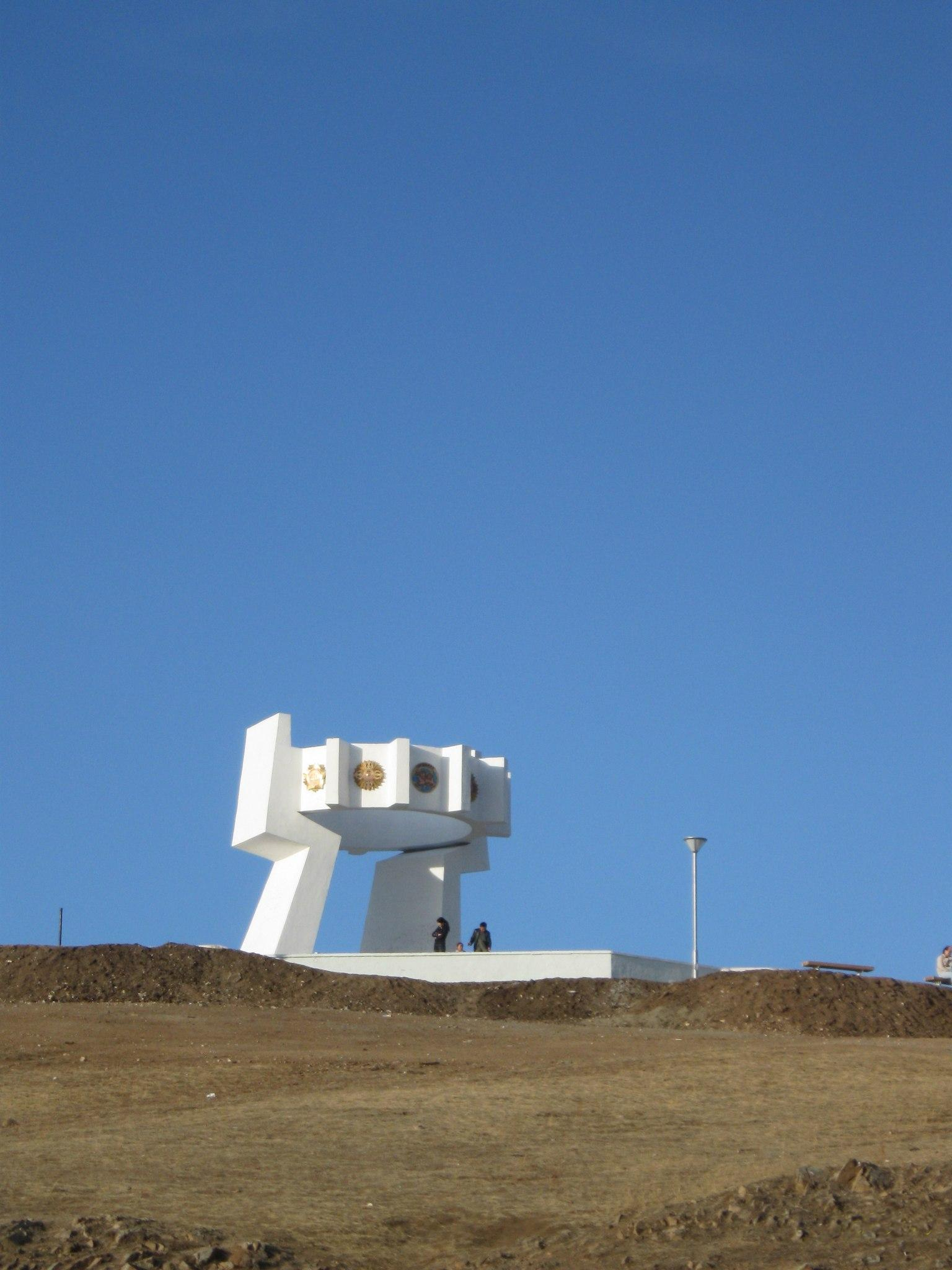
Friendship Monument

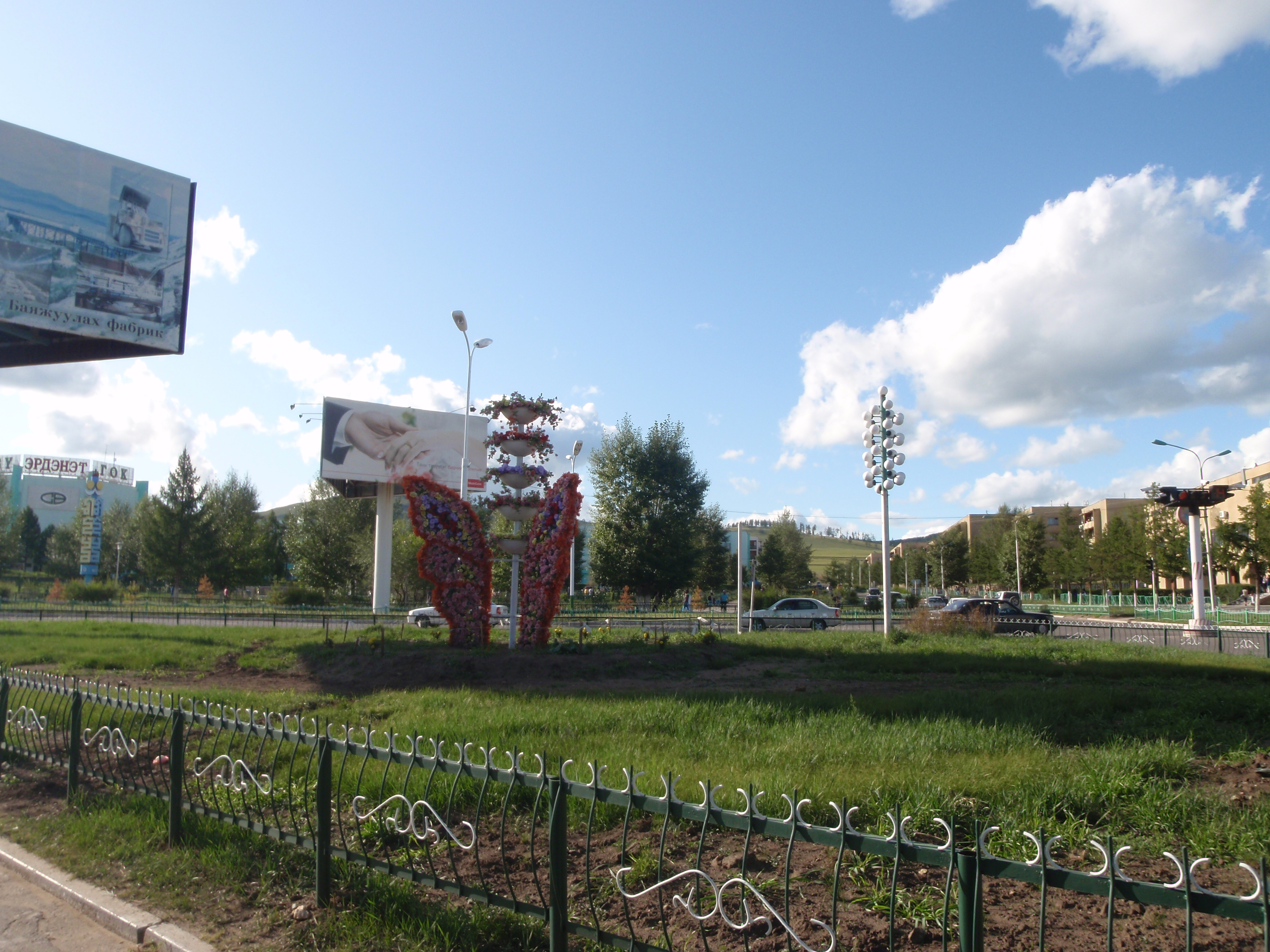
City Centre

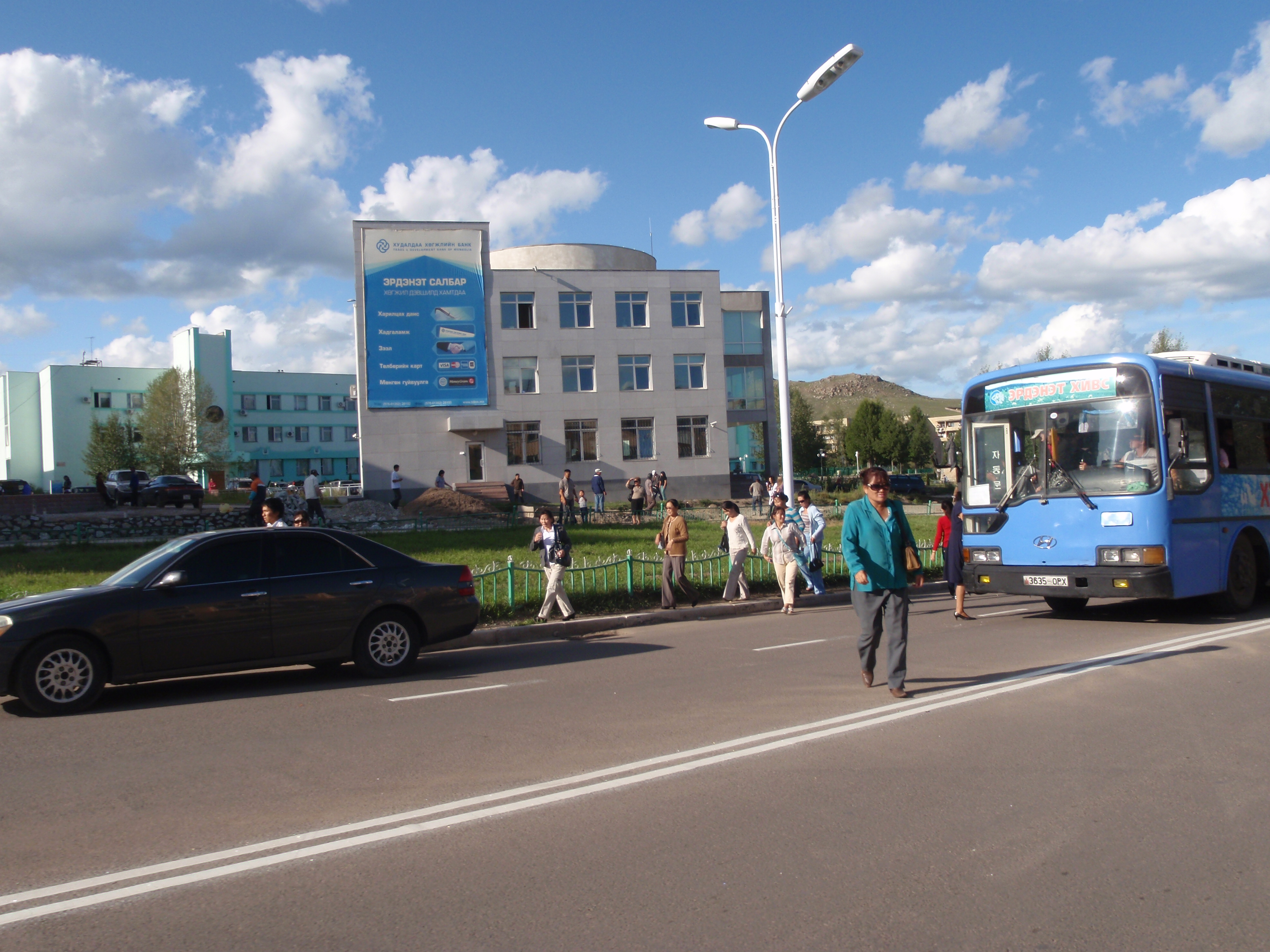
Main Street

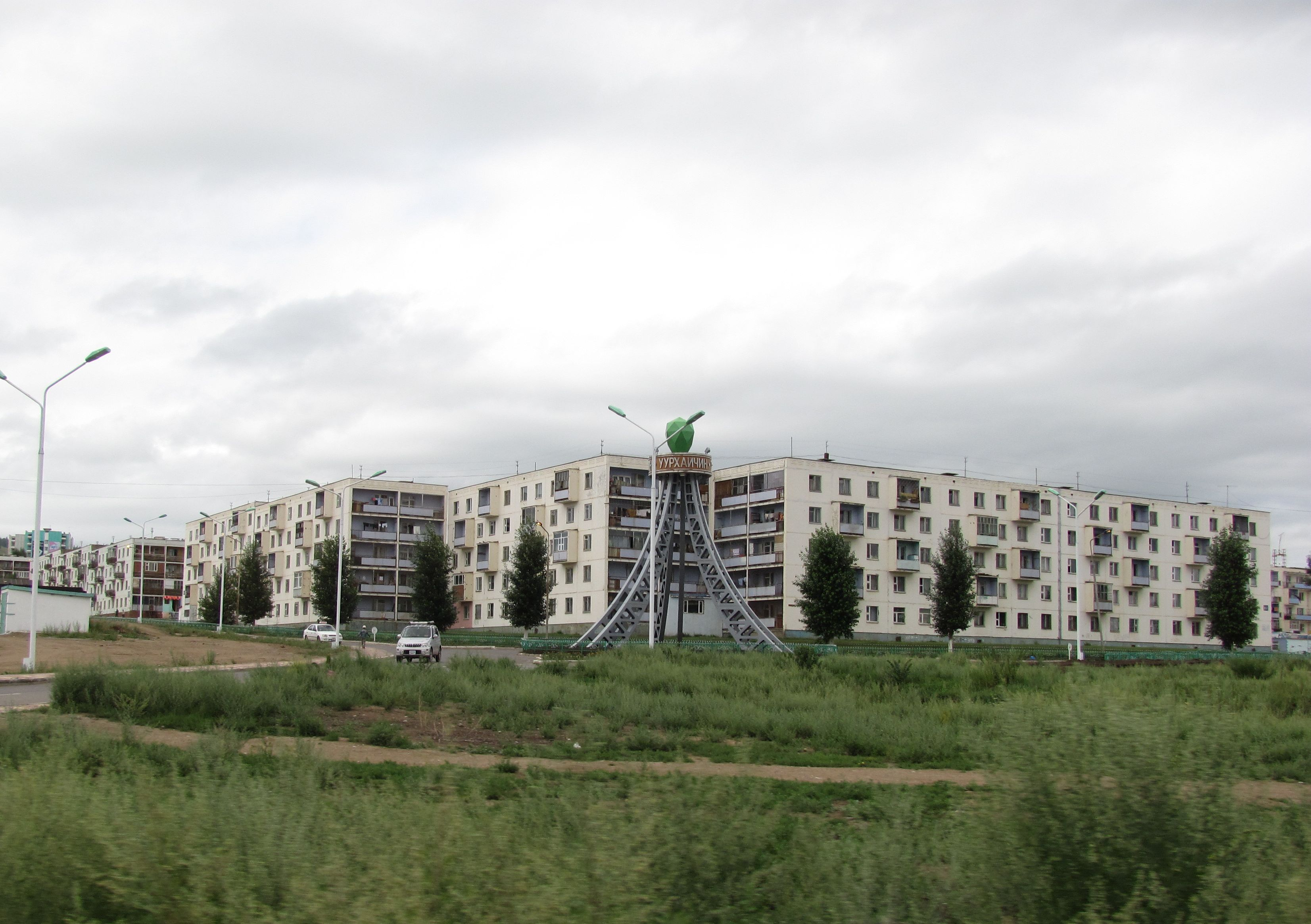
City Centre

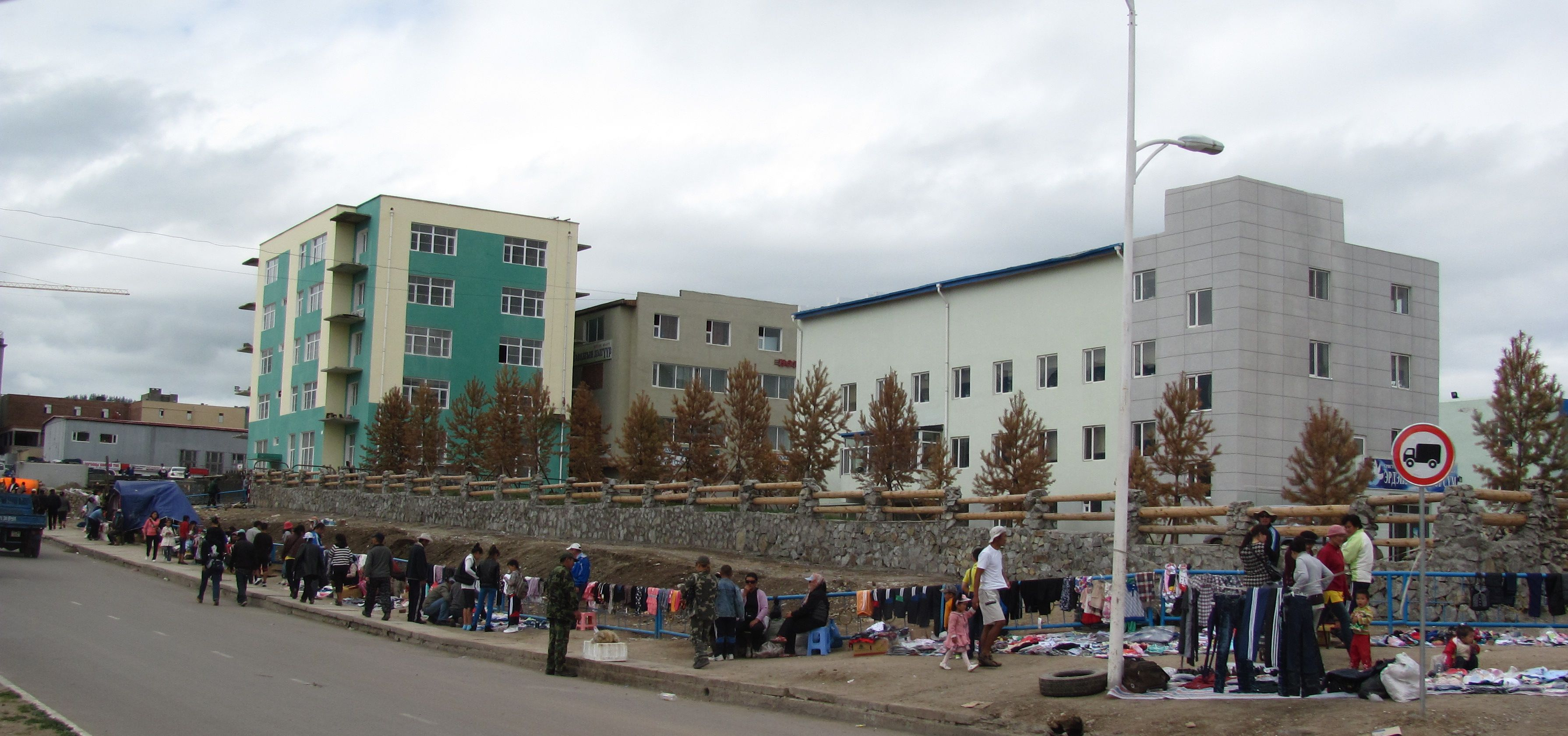
Market in the center

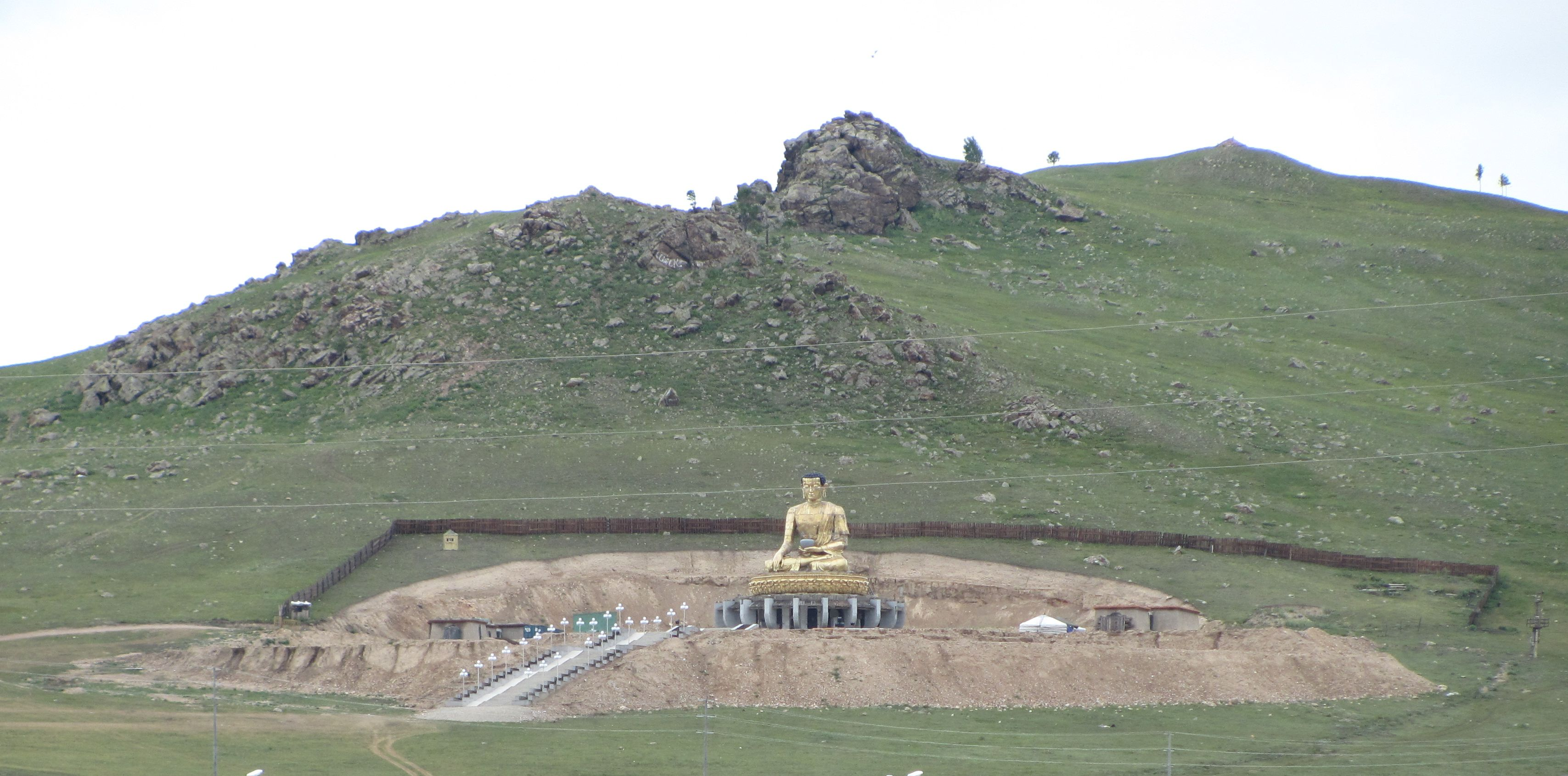
Statue of Buddha near the Friendship Monument

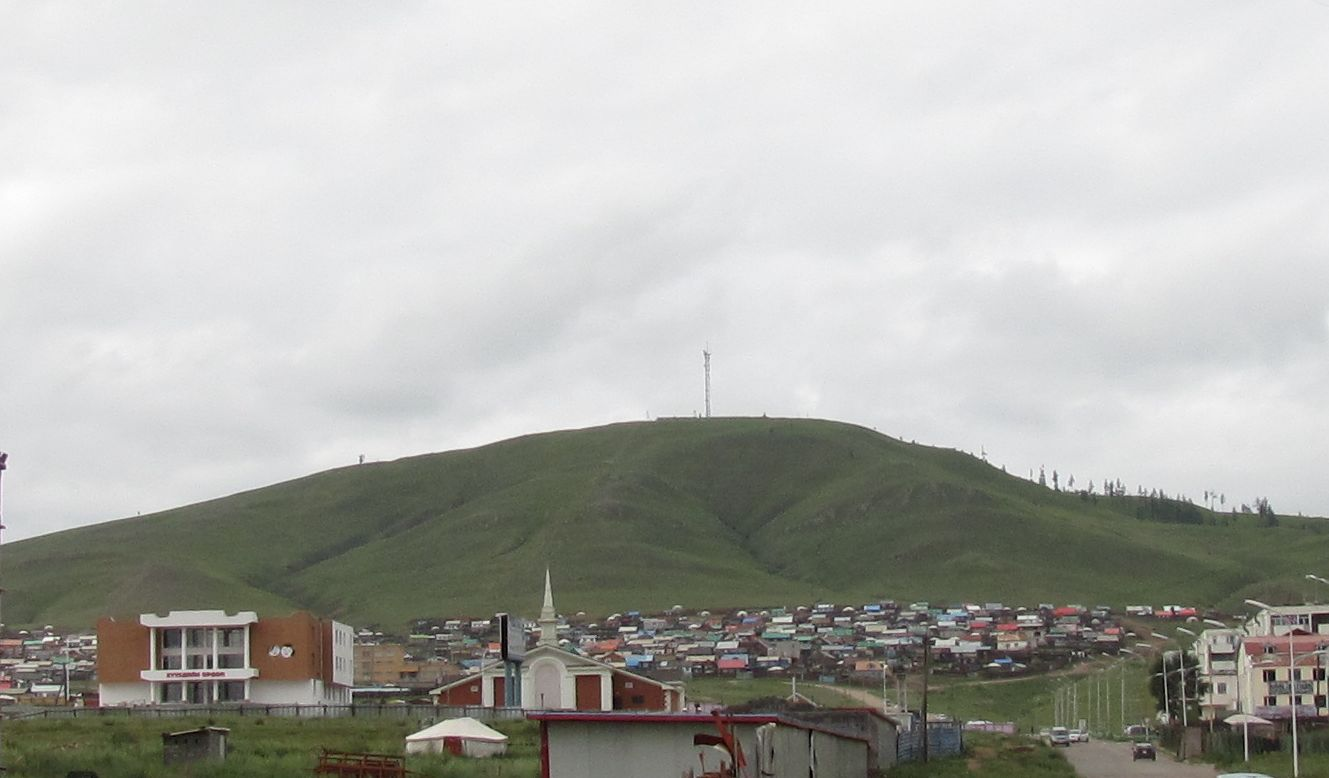
Residential area with LDS Church

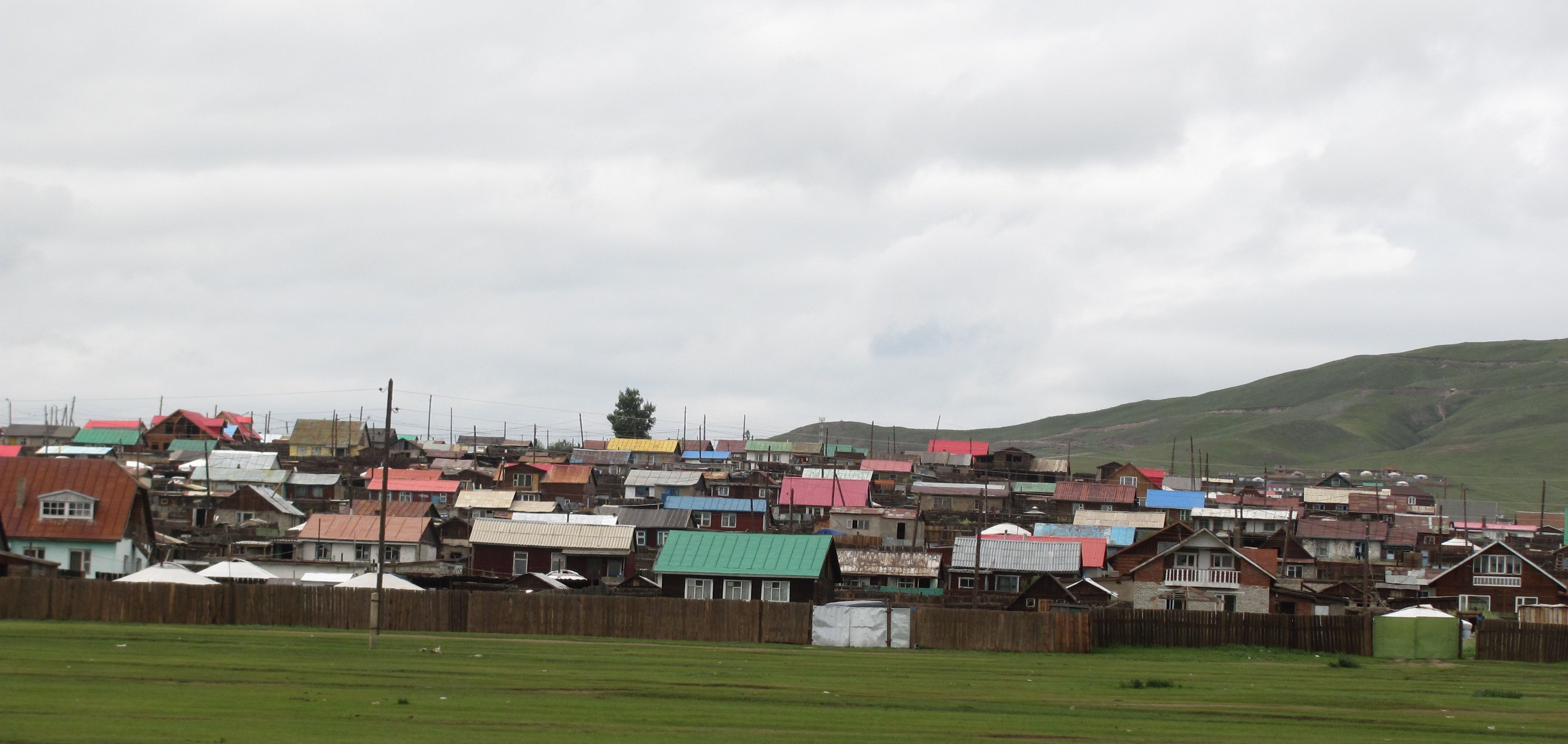
Typical residential area in the west of Erdenet

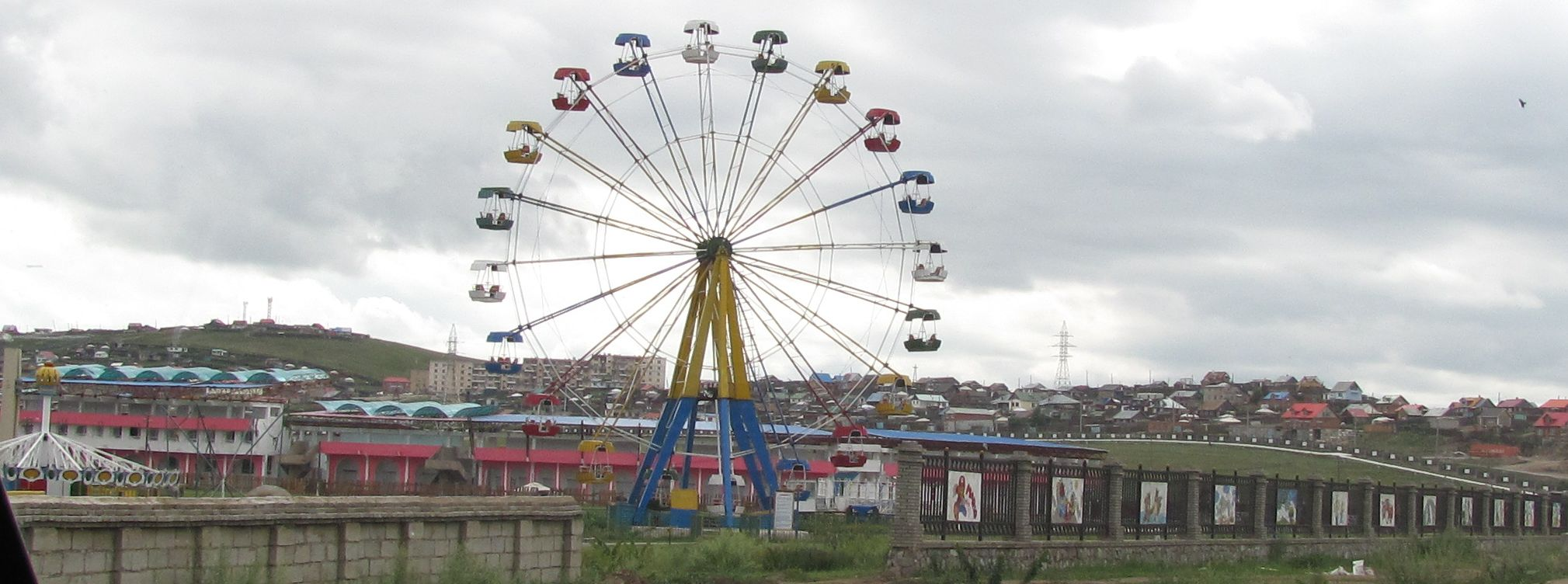
Amusement park

Panoramic view of Erdenet in the winter

== Notable residents ==
- Tsakhiagiin Elbegdorj, former President of Mongolia
- Oleksandr Zelenskyy, mining engineer and father of Volodymyr Zelenskyy
- Volodymyr Zelenskyy, current President of Ukraine

== Twin towns – sister cities ==
Erdenet is twinned with:

City	Region	Country
Fairbanks	Alaska	United States
Ulan-Ude	Buryatia	Russia
Edremit	Balıkesir	Turkey
Székesfehérvár	Fejér County	Hungary
