= Provinces of Mongolia =

First-level administrative divisions of Mongolia

Province Аймаг ᠠᠢᠮᠠᠭ
- Category: Unitary state
- Location: Mongolia
- Number: 21 provinces
- Populations: Lowest: 18,349 (Govisümber); Highest: 135,095 (Khövsgöl)
- Areas: Lowest: 844.0 km^{2} (325.9 sq mi) (Orkhon); Highest: 165,380.47 km^{2} (63,853.76 sq mi) (Ömnögovi)
- Government: Government of Mongolia

Mongolia is divided into 21 provinces or aimags (Mongolian: аймаг, romanized: aimag) and one provincial municipality, the capital city Ulaanbaatar. Each aimag is subdivided into several districts, which consists of several subdistricts.

The current three-tiered administrative system was created with 13 aimags in 1931. Modern provinces of Mongolia have been established since 1930. The capital, Ulaanbaatar, is governed as an independent first-level municipality separate from Töv Province, inside which it is situated.

== History ==
Outer Mongolia historically had four aimags and two frontier territories during the Qing control which lasted from 1691 to 1911. When Mongolia gained independence as the Bogd Khanate in 1911, two Dörbet aimags became subordinate to the Bogd Khan. Following the People's Revolution of 1921, changes were made in the administrative system of Mongolia. The four main aimags were renamed to existing geographic locations in 1923, and the two Dörbet aimags were merged into a single province, the Chandmani Uul aimag. The Mongolian People's Republic (MPR) was later established in 1924 following the death of the Bogd Khan.

In 1930, territories and local governments of the MPR were reorganized along economic and geographic factors. In November 1930, the state abolished the feudal administrative system in favour of a three-tiered system. Following the disestablishment of the five aimags, thirteen new provinces were established in 1931. The amount of provinces steadily increased to 21 in 1994, when Orkhon, Darkhan-Uul, and Govisümber Provinces were established, and has remained the same still to this day.

== List of provinces ==
Clickable map of Mongolian provinces

Provinces (Aimags)	Mongolian script	Year established	Area (km^{2})	Population^{2020 Census}	Density	Capital
Arkhangai	ᠠᠷᠤᠬᠠᠩᠭᠠᠢAruqaŋgai	1931	55,313.82	94,994	1.72	Tsetserleg
Bayankhongor	ᠪᠠᠶᠠᠨᠬᠣᠩᠭᠣᠷBayanqoŋgor	1941	115,977.80	88,672	0.76	Bayankhongor
Bayan-Ölgii	ᠪᠠᠶ᠋ᠠᠨ ᠥᠯᠦᠭᠡᠢBayan Ölügei	1940	45,704.89	108,530	2.37	Ölgii
Bulgan	ᠪᠤᠯᠠᠭᠠᠨBulagan	1938	48,733.00	62,089	1.27	Bulgan
Darkhan-Uul	ᠳᠠᠷᠬᠠᠨ ᠠᠭᠤᠯᠠDarqan Agula	1994	3,275.00	107,018	33	Darkhan
Dornod	ᠳᠣᠷᠤᠨᠠᠳᠤDorunadu	1941	123,597.43	82,054	0.66	Choibalsan
Dornogovi	ᠳᠣᠷᠤᠨᠠᠭᠣᠪᠢDorunagobi	1931	109,472.30	71,014	0.65	Sainshand
Dundgovi	ᠳᠤᠮᠳᠠᠭᠣᠪᠢDumdagobi	1942	74,690.32	47,104	0.63	Mandalgovi
Govi-Altai	ᠭᠣᠪᠢ ᠠᠯᠲᠠᠢGobi Altai	1940	141,447.67	57,748	0.41	Altai City
Govisümber	ᠭᠣᠪᠢ ᠰᠦᠮᠪᠦᠷGobi Sümbür	1996	5,541.80	17,928	3.23	Choir
Khentii	ᠬᠡᠨᠲᠡᠢKentei	1930	80,325.08	77,957	0.97	Chinggis City
Khovd	ᠬᠣᠪᠳᠤQobdu	1931	76,060.38	89,712	1.18	Khovd
Khövsgöl	ᠬᠥᠪᠰᠦᠭᠦᠯKöbsügül	1931	100,628.82	135,095	1.34	Mörön
Orkhon	ᠣᠷᠬᠤᠨOrqun	1994	844.00	107,634	128	Erdenet
Ömnögovi	ᠡᠮᠦᠨᠡᠭᠣᠪᠢEmünegobi	1931	165,380.47	69,187	0.42	Dalanzadgad
Övörkhangai	ᠥᠪᠦᠷᠬᠠᠩᠭ᠋ᠠᠢÖbürqaŋgai	1931	62,895.33	116,732	1.86	Arvaikheer
Selenge	ᠰᠡᠯᠡᠩᠭᠡSeleŋge	1934	41,152.63	110,110	2.68	Sükhbaatar
Sükhbaatar	ᠰᠦᠬᠡᠪᠠᠭᠠᠲᠤᠷSükebagatur	1943	82,287.15	63,182	0.77	Baruun-Urt
Töv	ᠲᠥᠪTöb	1931	74,042.37	94,250	1.27	Zuunmod
Uvs	ᠤᠪᠰᠤUbsu	1931	69,585.39	83,223	1.20	Ulaangom
Zavkhan	ᠵᠠᠪᠬᠠᠨJabqan	1931	82,455.66	72,823	0.88	Uliastai
Ulaanbaatar (provincial municipality)	ᠤᠯᠠᠭᠠᠨᠪᠠᠭᠠᠲᠤᠷUlaganbagatur	1942	4,704.40	1,539,810	327	Ulaanbaatar

== See also ==
- ISO 3166-2 codes for Mongolia
- Lists of political and geographic subdivisions by total area
- List of Mongolian provinces by GDP
