= Govisümber Province =

Mongolian province

Govisümber Province Говьсүмбэр аймаг ᠭᠣᠪᠢᠰᠦᠮᠪᠦᠷᠠᠶᠢᠮᠠᠭ
- Province
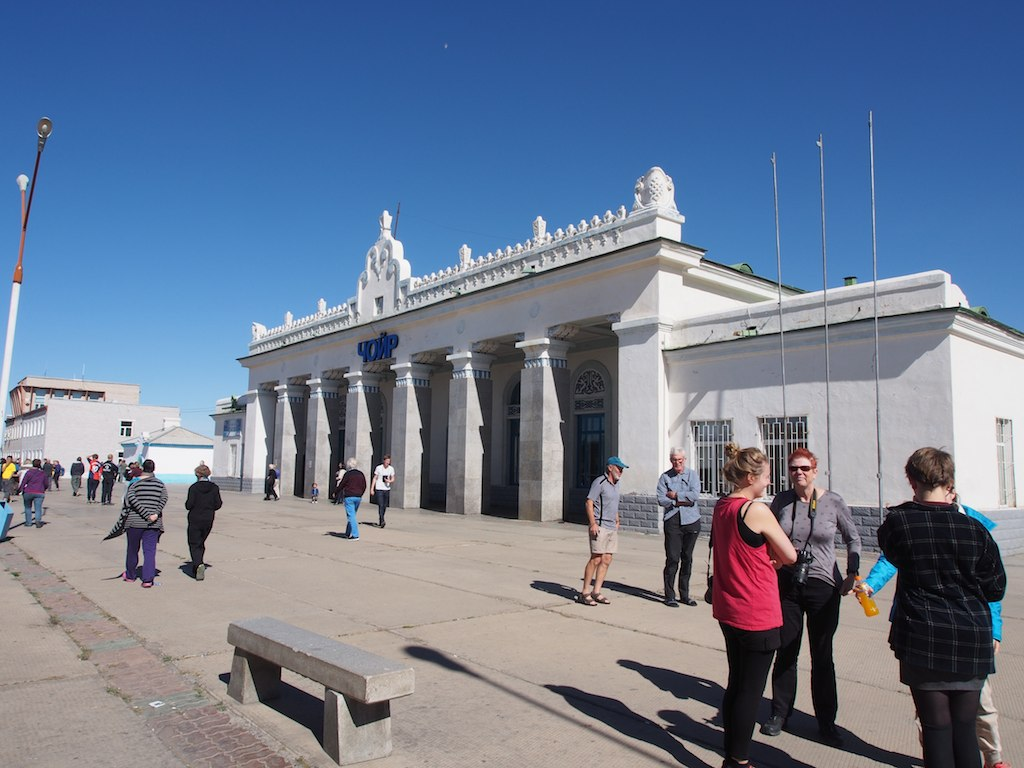
- Railroad station at Choir

- Flag Coat of arms

- Coordinates: 46°30′N 108°30′E
- Country: Mongolia
- Established: 1994
- Capital: Choir

Area
  - Total: 5,541.80 km^{2} (2,139.70 sq mi)

Population (2025)
  - Total: 18,107
  - Rank: 21st
  - Density: 3.2673/km^{2} (8.4624/sq mi)

GDP
  - Total: MNT 150 billion US$ 50 million (2022)
  - Per capita: MNT 8,263,010; US$ 2,646 (2022)
- Time zone: UTC+08:00
- Area code: +976 7054xxxx
- ISO 3166 code: MN-064
- Vehicle registration: ГС_
- Website: www.govisumber.gov.mn

Gowisümber (Mongolian: Говьсүмбэр, [ˈɢœw̜ʲsumb̥ɘr]; lit. Gobi-Sümber) is one of the 21 aimags (provinces) of Mongolia. It is located in the center of the country. Its capital is Choir. Govisümber is the least populated Mongolian aimag.

== History ==
Borjigon clan said in The Secret History of the Mongols: one of the world's greatest cultural and historical written relics was written in 1240—the year of white mouse. Genghis Khan is a grandson of the Bodanchar who is the heir of the Burte Chono. It is stated in the historical literature that Bodanchar had separated from his brothers and founded the Borjigon clan.

In 1691, when the Manchurian emperior Enkh-Amgalan made Mongolia its tributary state and divided four Mongolian aimags and seven khoshuus, there was founded Borjigon khoshuu of Setsen khan aimag.

In 1911, the name of the khoshuu was changed to Borjigon Setsen van khoshuu.

In 1923, the name was changed to Otsol Sansar uuliin khoshuu.

From 1931 onward, it was called Govisumber soum of the Töv aimag, Sumber soum of the Dornogovi aimag.

From 1991 onward, it was called Choir City.

From 1994 onward, it is called Govisumber aimag.

== Administrative subdivisions ==
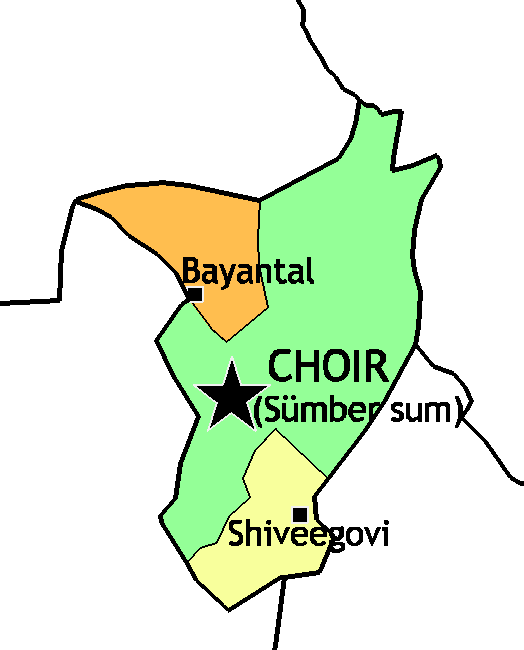
Sums of Govisümber

The Sums of Govisümber Aimag
Sum	Mongolian	Population (2003)	Population (2008)	Population (2014)	Area (km^{2})	Density (/km^{2})	Sum centre population (2002)
Bayantal	Баянтал	838	851	1,084	916.06	0.92	120
Shiveegovi	Шивээговь	2,685	2,745	3,198	857.55	3.20	1,800
Sümber (Choir)	Сүмбэр	8,996	9,719	11,609	3768.19	2.58	7,998 * (2006)

== Demographics ==
In 2020, the majority of the religion of the residents is Buddhism (90.3%) followed by Shamans (6.7%), Christianity (2.0%), Islam (0.4%) and other religions (0.6%).

== Economy ==
In 2018, the province contributed 0.29% of the total national GDP of Mongolia.

== Infrastructure ==
The province has one general hospital, one family hospital, one district health center, four private hospitals, one health department, one medical supply organization and 10 pharmacies. In 2018, there were 71.1 hospital beds per 10,000 of its population.
