= Orkhon Province =

Province of Mongolia

Orkhon Province Орхон аймаг ᠣᠷᠬᠤᠨᠠᠶᠢᠮᠠᠭ
- Province
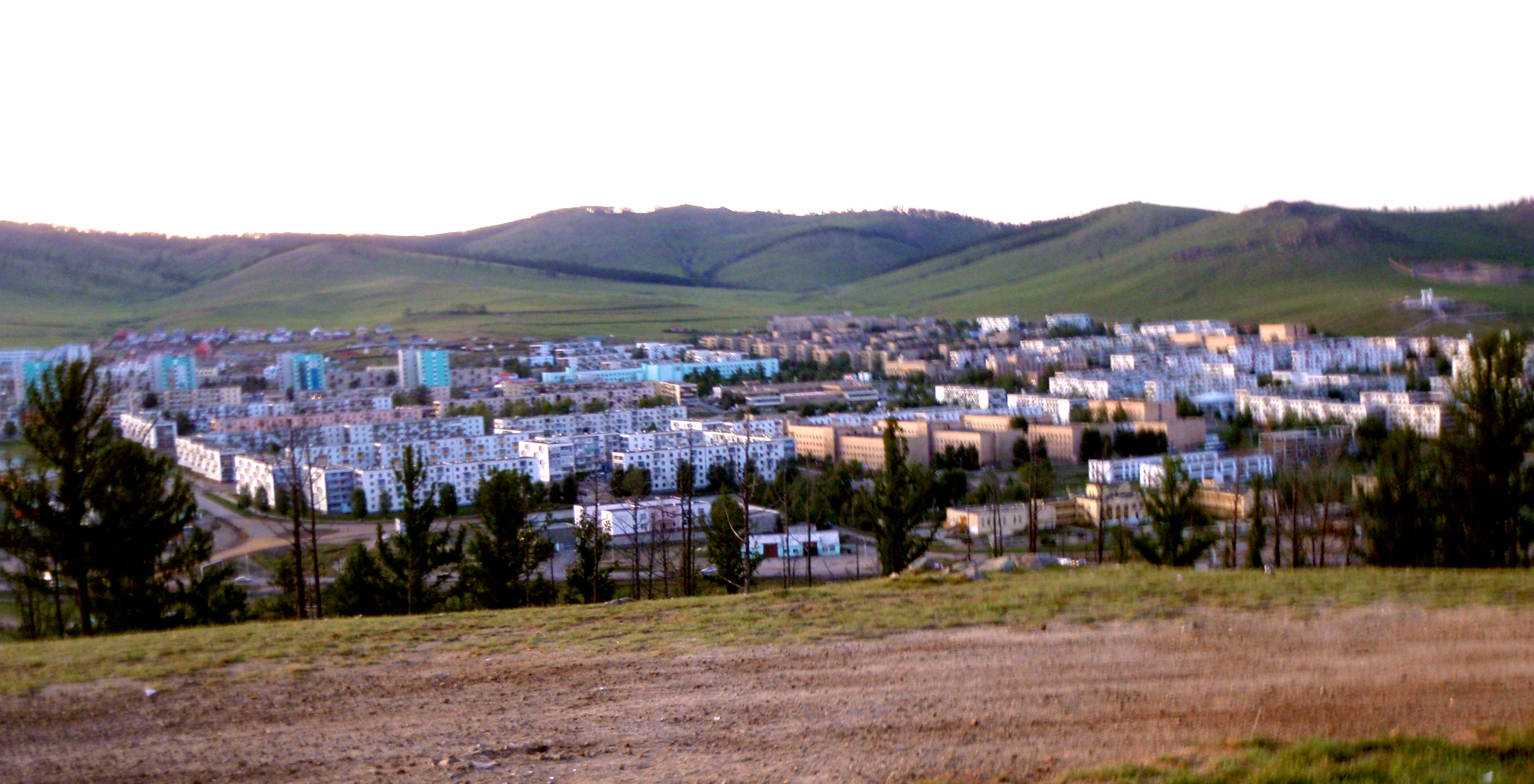
- Erdenet

- Flag Seal

- Coordinates: 49°0′N 104°15′E
- Country: Mongolia
- Established: 1976
- Capital: Erdenet

Area
  - Total: 844 km^{2} (326 sq mi)

Population (2020)
  - Total: 107,634
  - Density: 128/km^{2} (330/sq mi)

GDP
  - Total: MNT 3,350 billion US$ 1.1 billion (2022)
  - Per capita: MNT 21,692,300; US$ 10,100 (2022)
- Time zone: UTC+8
- Area code: +976 7035 (7039)
- ISO 3166 code: MN-035
- Vehicle registration: ОРA, OPO, OPН, ОРУ
- Website: www.erdenet.mn

Orkhon Province (Mongolian: Орхон аймаг) is one of the 21 provinces of Mongolia, located in the north of the country. Its capital is Erdenet. The province is named after the Orkhon River.

== History ==
Orkhon Province was carved out of Bulgan Province in 1994 to form a new entity together with its capital Erdenet, which had previously been administered as a federal municipality.

== Administrative subdivisions ==
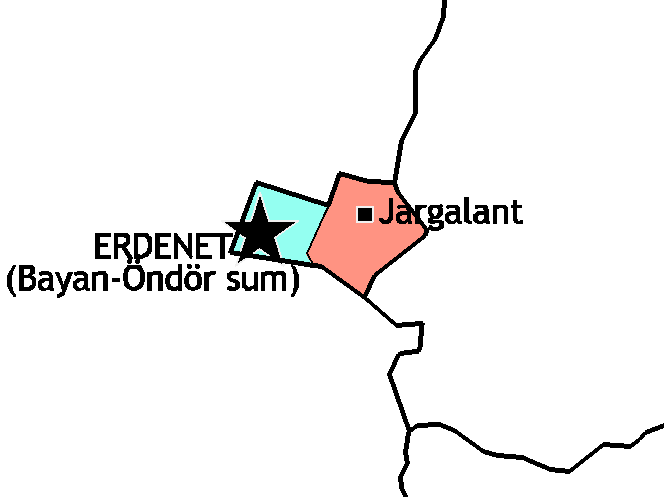
Sums of the Orkhon Aimag

The Sums of Orkhon Aimag
Sum	Mongolian	Area km^{2}	Population (2004)	Population (2006)	Population (2008)	Population (2009)	Density /km^{2}
Bayan-Öndör*	Баян-Өндөр	208.0	80,858	83,160	86,866	88,046	423.30
Jargalant	Жаргалант	635.6	2,733	3,125	3,009	3,166	4.98

^{*} - includes aimag capital Erdenet

== Economy ==
In 2018, the province contributed to 5.72% of the total national GDP of Mongolia.

== Sustainability ==
In September 2026, the provincial government signed a memorandum of understanding with the United Nations Development Programme (UNDP) to launch green and inclusive cities on Erdenet. The program is funded by the Global Environment Facility and implemented by the Ministry of Environment and Climate Change with the support of UNDP. The project would focus on circular economy, spatial planning, water management and nature-based solutions.
