= Beekeeping in Mongolia =

Beekeeping in Mongolia has a short history, with several species and subspecies of managed honey bees having been introduced in Mongolia since 1959. Introduced and managed species include the European dark bee, the Caucasian honey bee, the Russian Far East bee (Apis mellifera carpatica), and the "Haliun" bee that resulted from crossbreeding three geographically distinct honey bee species.

== History ==
Some historical records suggest that beekeeping in Mongolia occurred during the rule of Genghis Khan, although the Western honey bee (Apis mellifera) is not native to Mongolia. Several records documented Genghis Khan's soldiers, and subsequent successor armies, consuming products such as honey and mead. During the rule of Ögedei Khan (1229-1241), a large fountain known as the Silver Tree, built by the French metalsmith Guillaume Boucher, contained five "tubes" which distributed special drinks, one of which was honey-based.

In the modern era, Mongolia has developed apiculture as part of a strategy of intensifying its agrarian industry, beginning in 1959 with the relocation of 20 hives from Russia to Shaamar, Selenge. The Soviet Mongolian government began supporting local beekeeping and the bee-product industry in 1974 with the formation of the Bee Breeding Research Unit (BBRU). Despite the intensive development of beekeeping from 1965 to 1990, Mongolian apiculture was significantly weakened by the transition to a market economy after the Mongolian Revolution of 1990. It was largely revived in 2002.

== Statistics ==
According to the Mongolian Beekeeper Society, there are approximately 450 beekeepers who maintain 7,700 hives. However, 9,900 hives are registered with various government entities. As of 2015,More than 200 tons of honey has been produced in Mongolia.

Mongolia is the least densely populated country in the world, meaning apiaries are up to 600 kilometres (370 mi) apart from one another. The lack of native honey bee population, as well as natural barriers to interaction, such as the Gobi Desert and the Altai Mountains, have resulted in significant isolation between populations of honeybees. One result of this is that the honey bee pathosphere in Mongolia is unique, compared to those in more densely settled areas. Diseases of the honey bee such as acute bee paralysis virus, Israeli acute paralysis virus, and Lake Sinai virus strain 2 that are common elsewhere are either rare or absent in Mongolian honey bees.

=== Production ===
As of 2021, Mongolia harvested more than 300 tons of honey each year. More than 80% of domestic Mongolian honey comes from natural wildflowers, with the remaining 20% from crops such as rice and rapeseed.

Selenge Province, in the northeast of the country, has developed an organic wildflower honey industry, particularly in the Bayangol, Shaamar, and Sükhbaatar districts that are at a high elevation. It is the hub of the Mongolian beekeeping industry.
