= Amarbayasgalant Monastery =

Monastery in Baruunbüren, Selenge, Mongolia

ᠠᠮᠤᠷ ᠪᠠᠶᠠᠰᠬᠤᠯᠠᠩᠲᠤ ᠬᠡᠶᠢᠳ Амарбаясгалант хийд 慶寧寺
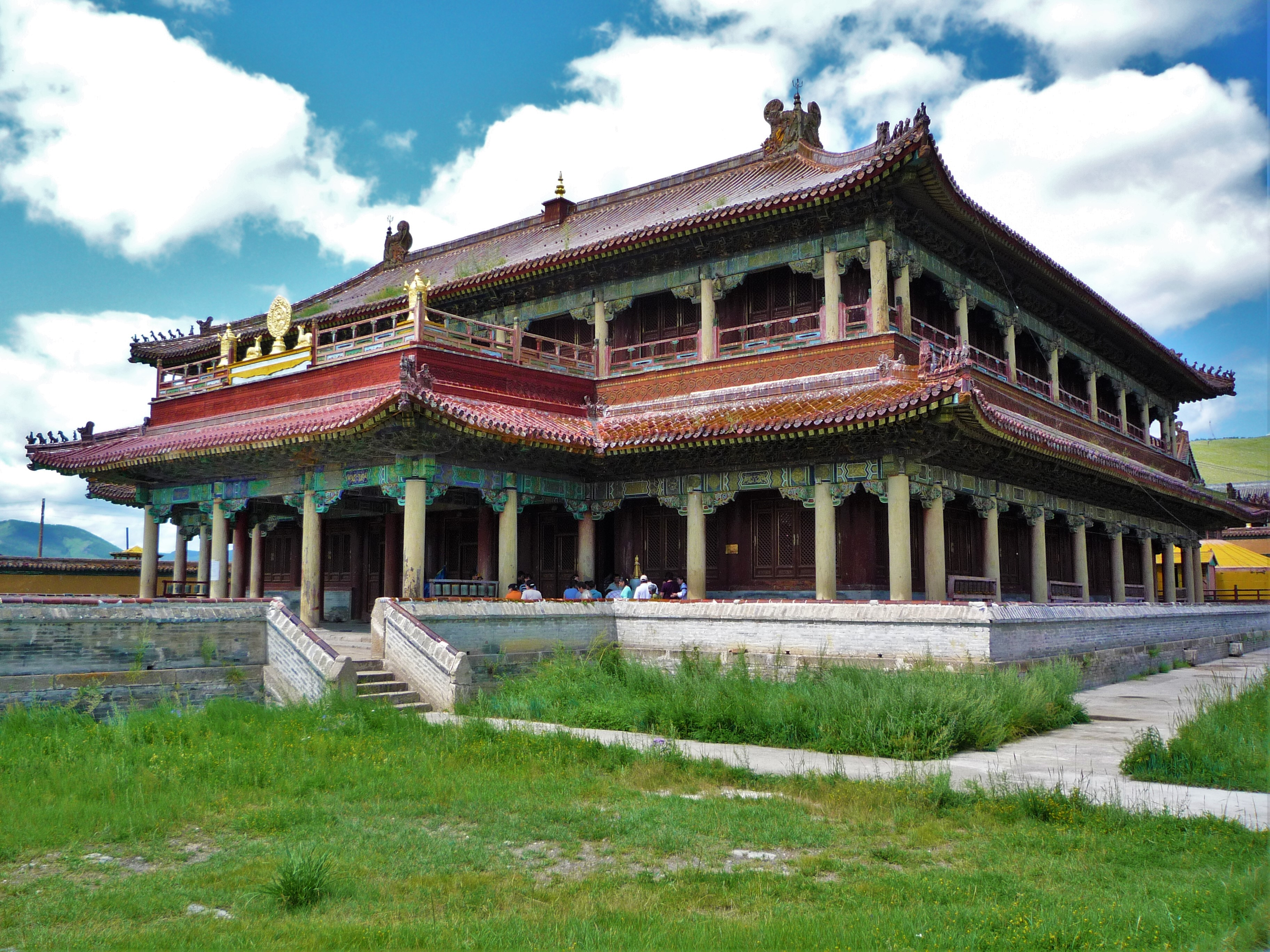

- Location within Mongolia

Religion
- Affiliation: Tibetan Buddhism

Location
- Location: Mount Büren-Khaan, Baruunbüren, Selenge Province, Mongolia
- Country: Mongolia
- Interactive map of ᠠᠮᠤᠷ ᠪᠠᠶᠠᠰᠬᠤᠯᠠᠩᠲᠤ ᠬᠡᠶᠢᠳ; Амарбаясгалант хийд 慶寧寺
- Coordinates: 49°28′48″N 105°05′06″E

Architecture
- Style: Chinese, Mongol and Tibetan influences
- Established: 1727

Amarbayasgalant Monastery (Mongolian: Амарбаясгалант хийд, ᠠᠮᠤᠷ ᠪᠠᠶᠠᠰᠬᠤᠯᠠᠩᠲᠤ ᠬᠡᠶᠢᠳAmurbayasqulangtu keyid; Manchu: ᡠ᠊ᡵᡤᡠᠨ ᡝᠯᡥᡝ ᠰᡟ Urgun Elhe Sy, simplified Chinese: 庆宁寺; traditional Chinese: 慶寧寺; pinyin: Qìngníng sì) is one of the three largest Buddhist monastic centers in Mongolia. The monastery complex is located in the Iven Valley near the Selenge River, at the foot of Mount Büren-Khaan in Baruunbüren District of Selenge Province in northern Mongolia. The nearest town is Erdenet which is about 120 km to the southwest.

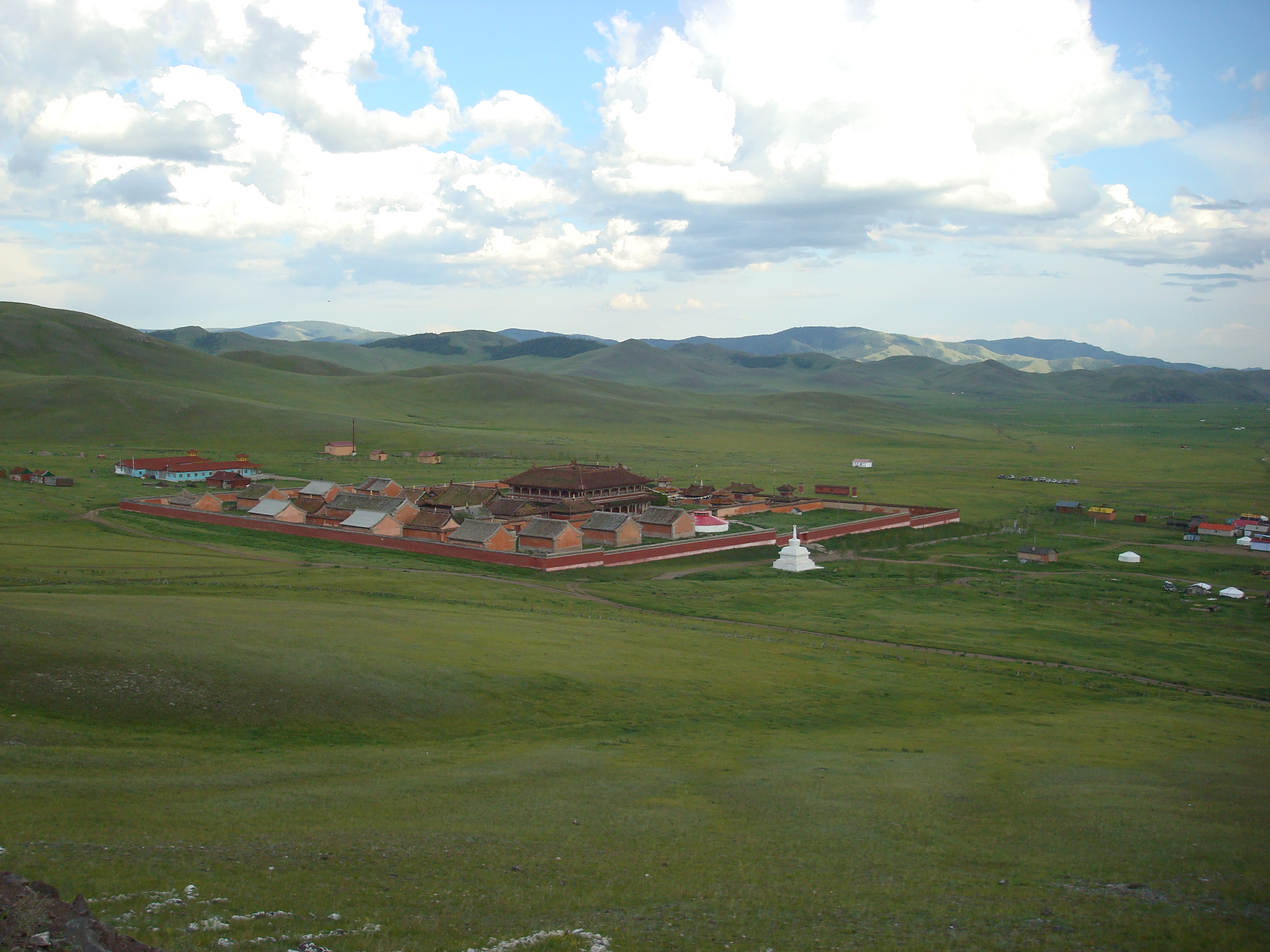
Amarbayasgalant Monastery

The monastery was established and funded by order of the Yongzheng Emperor (and completed under his successor the Qianlong Emperor) of Qing China to serve as a final resting place for Zanabazar (1635–1723), the first Jebtsundamba Khutuktu, or spiritual head of Tibetan Buddhism for the Khalkha in Outer Mongolia and a spiritual mentor to both emperors' ancestor, the Kangxi Emperor. Tradition holds that while searching for an appropriate site to build the monastery, the exploratory group came across two young boys, Amur and Bayasqulangtu, playing on the steppe. They were inspired to build the monastery on that very spot and to name it after the two children, Amur-Bayasqulangtu. More likely, the location was chosen because it stood at the place where the lama's traveling Da Khuree (his mobile monastery and prime residence) was encamped at the moment of his death. Construction took place between 1727 and 1736 and Zanabazar's remains were transferred there in 1779.

Amarbayasgalant monastery is dedicated to Zanabazar's main tutelary deity, Maitreya. Unlike Erdene Zuu Monastery, which is an ensemble of temple halls of different styles, Amarbayasgalant shows great stylistic unity. The overriding style is Chinese, with some Mongol and Tibetan influence. The monastery resembles Yongzheng's own palace Yonghegong in Beijing (converted by his son the Qianlong Emperor into a Buddhist monastery). Originally consisting of over 40 temples, the monastery was laid out in a symmetrical pattern, with the main buildings succeeding one another along a north–south axis, while the secondary buildings are laid out on parallel sides.

Amarbayasgalant was one of the very few monasteries to have partly escaped destruction during the Stalinist purges of 1937, after which only the buildings of the central section remained. Many of the monks were executed by the country's Communist regime and the monastery's artifacts, including thangkas, statues, and manuscripts were looted, although some were hidden until more fortunate times.

Today, only 28 temples remain. Restoration work began in 1988 with funds provided by UNESCO and private sources and some of the new statuary was commissioned in New Delhi, India.
