= Zanabazar =

Tibetan Buddhist spiritual leader from Mongolia

Öndör Gegeen Zanabazar Jebtsundamba Khutuktu
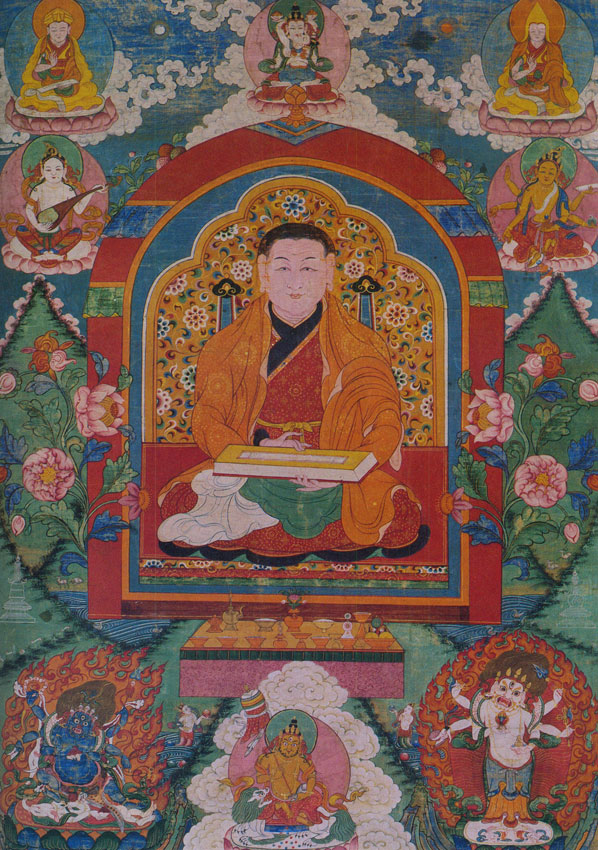
- Self-portrait, late 17th or early 18th century

Personal life
- Born: Eshidorji; 1635 Yesönzüil, Övörkhangai, Tüsheet Khanate
- Died: 1723 (aged 87–88) Beijing, Qing dynasty, China
- Resting place: Unknown

Religious life
- Religion: Tibetan Buddhism
- School: Gelugpa (Yellow Hat)

Senior posting
- Reincarnation: Taranatha

Öndör Gegeen Zanabazar (Note: Mongolian: Өндөр Гэгээн Занабазар, ᠵᠠᠨᠠᠪᠠᠽᠠᠷ, Mongolian pronunciation: [ɵntr keγeɴ tsanβatsr], "High Saint Zanabazar"; 1635–1723) (born Eshidorji) (Note: Mongolian: Ишдорж, Ishdorj; Tibetan: ཡེ་ཤེས་རྡོ་རྗེ, Wylie: Ye shes rdo rje) was the first Jebtsundamba Khutuktu (Note: Mongolian: Жавзандамба хутагт/Jawzandamba xutagt, Tibetan: རྗེ་བཙུན་དམ་པ་ཧུ་ཐུག་ཐུ་, Wylie: rje btsun dam pa hu thug tu, "reincarnation of Jebtsundamba") and the first Bogd Gegeen or supreme spiritual authority, of the Gelugpa (Yellow Hat) lineage of Tibetan Mahayana Buddhism in Mongolia.

The son of a Mongol Tüsheet Khan, Zanabazar was declared spiritual leader of Khalkha Mongols by a convocation of nobles in 1639 when he was just four years old. The 5th Dalai Lama (1617–1682) later recognized him as the reincarnation of the Buddhist scholar Taranatha and bestowed on him the Sanskrit name Jñānavajra (Sanskrit: ज्ञानवज्र, Zanabazar in Mongolian) meaning "thunderbolt scepter of wisdom". Over the course of nearly 60 years, Zanabazar advanced the Gelugpa school of Buddhism among the Mongols, supplanting or synthesizing Sakya or "Red Hat" Buddhist traditions that had prevailed in the area, while strongly influencing social and political developments in 17th century Mongolia. His close ties with both Khalka Mongol leaders and the devout Kangxi Emperor facilitated the Khalkha's submission to Qing rule in 1691.

In addition to his spiritual and political roles, Zanabazar was a polymath – a sculptor, painter, architect, poet, costume designer, scholar and linguist, who is credited with launching Mongolia's seventeenth century cultural renaissance. He is best known for his Buddhist sculptures created in the Nepali-derived style, two of the most famous being the White Tara and Varajradhara, sculpted in the 1680s. To aid translation of sacred Tibetan texts, he created the Soyombo script from which sprang the Soyombo that later became a national symbol of Mongolia. Zanabazar used his artistic output to promote Buddhism among all levels of Khalkha society and unify Khalkha Mongol tribes during a time of social and political turmoil.

== Life ==
=== Early life, 1635-1651 ===
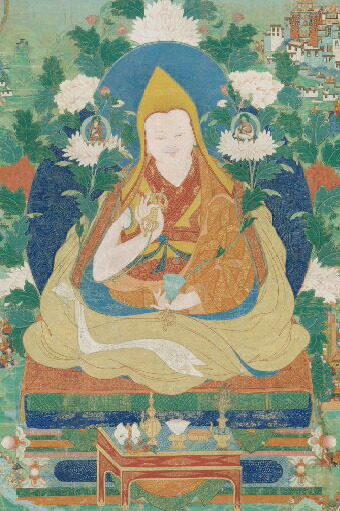
5th Dalai Lama

Zanabazar was born in 1635 in present-day Yesönzüil, Övörkhangai, Mongolia. Named Eshidorji at birth, he was the second son of the Tüsheet khan Gombodorj (1594-1655) and his wife, Khandojamtso. Gombodorj, one of three Khalkha khans who could trace his lineage directly back to Genghis Khan, was the grandson of Abtai Sain Khan (1554-1588), who had first opened Khalkha Mongol lands to the spread of “Yellow Hat” or Gelugpa Tibetan Buddhism. In 1578 Abtai's uncle, Altan Khan, bestowed the Mongolian language title "Dalai Lama" on the Gelug leader Sonam Gyatso.

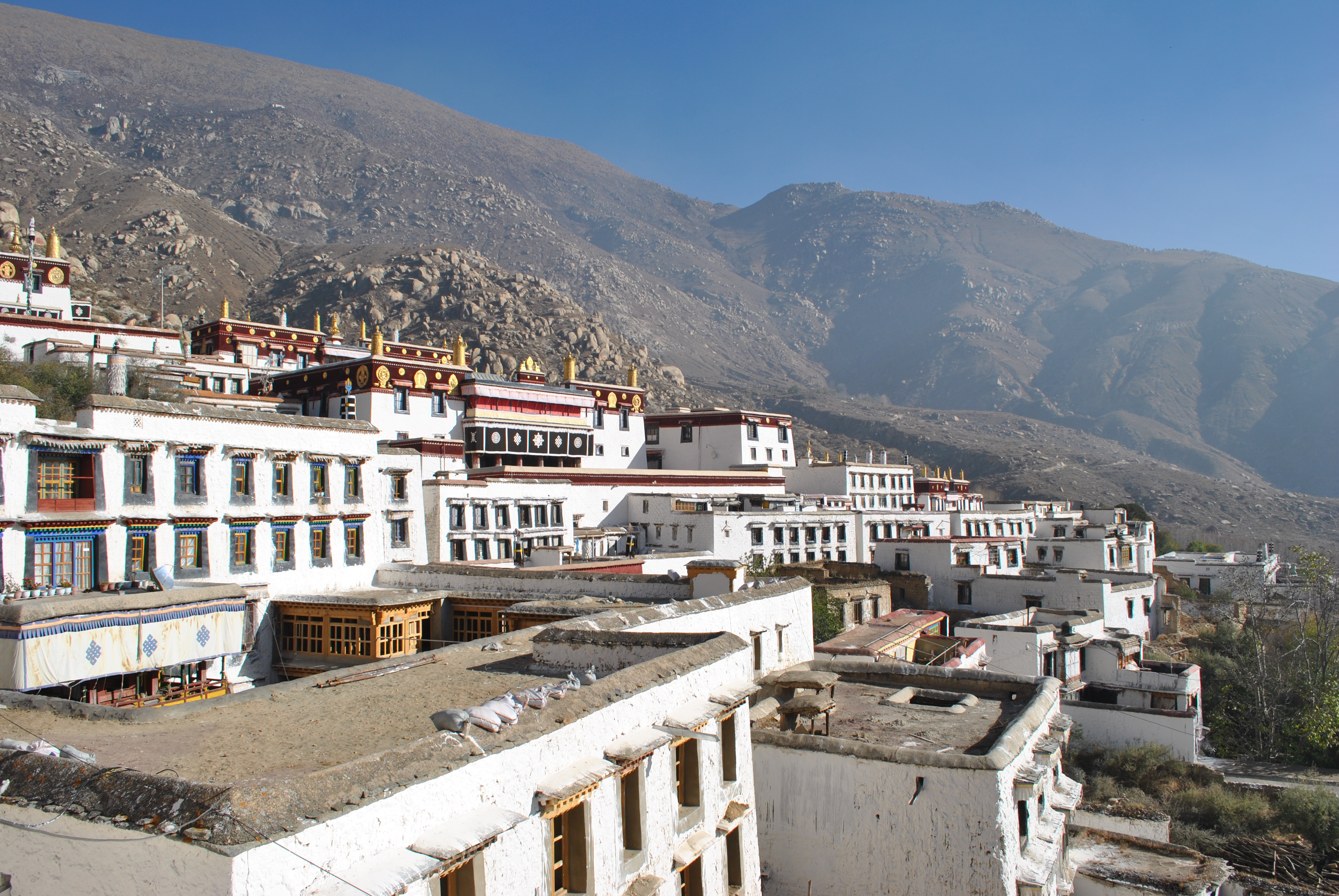
Drepung Monastery

According to tradition, Zanabazar showed signs of advanced intelligence, linguistic abilities, and religious devotion from an early age. Miraculous incidents allegedly occurred during his youth and he was able to fully recite the Jambaltsanjod prayer (praise of Manjusri) at age three. In 1639, an assembly of Khalkha nobles at Shireet Tsagaan nuur (75 km east of the former capital Karakorum) recognized Zanabazar as an Öndör Gegeen (high saint) and the Khalkh's supreme religious leader, even though he was only four years old at the time. They pledged their obedience, proclaiming him "He who brandishes the banner of the Sakyapa" school and "teacher of multitudes". This designation as supreme religious leader strengthened ties between the Khalkha aristocracy and the Tibetan Buddhist hierarchy, gave Khalkha nobility, added religious legitimacy, and served as a rallying point for Khalkha tribal leaders, who that same year had forged an uneasy alliance with western-based Oirat (Dzungar) Mongol tribes.

Zanabazar established his religious center in 1647, a traveling ger camp known as the “Monastery of the West” (Baruun Khüree), later renamed Shankh Monastery. In 1649, Zanabazar was sent to Tibet to receive personal instruction from the 5th Dalai Lama and the 4th Panchen Lama at Drepung Monastery. The Dalai Lama identified him as the reincarnation of the scholar Taranatha (1575–1634), who had led the rival Jonang school of Tibetan Buddhism until his death in Mongolia one year before Zanabazar's birth. Taranatha was believed to be the 15th reincarnation (Khutuktu) of Jebtsundamba (one of the Buddha's original 500 disciples). Thus Zanabazar was recognized as the 16th reincarnation and he and his successors thereafter referred to as the Jebtsundamba Khutuktu. The Tibetan Buddhist hierarchy also granted him the additional title Bogd Gegeen, or "Highest Enlightened Saint", designating him the top-ranking Lama in Mongolia.

=== Spiritual and temporal leadership, 1651-1686 ===
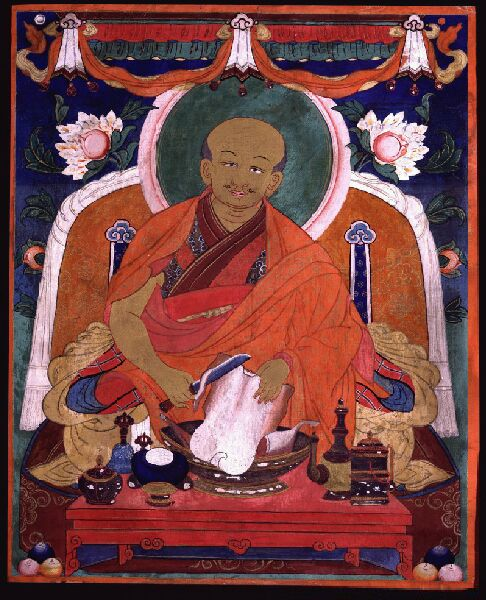
Thangka depicting Zanabazar

Following his journeys to Tibet in 1651 and again in 1656, Zanabazar and his retinue of Tibetan lamas founded a series of Gelug-influenced monasteries, temples, and Buddhist shrines throughout Mongol territory, the most noteworthy being a stupa to house Taranatha's remains, the Saridgiin Monastery in the Khentii mountains (completed in 1680), and several movable temples which contained paintings, sculptures, wall hangings and ritual objects influenced by the Tibetan-Nepalese style and either imported from Tibet or produced by Zanabazar or his students.

By the late 1650s, Zanabazar further solidified his spiritual and political authority over Khalkha tribal leaders. The gers he received as gifts from Khalkha nobles upon his election in 1639 became his Örgöö, his ambulatory palatial residence. Known as the Shira Busiin Ord (Yellow Screen Palace) - later called Urga by the Russians and Da Khuree or Ikh Khuree by Mongols - it would eventually become the Mongolian capital Ulaanbaatar after settling at its current location, near the confluence of the Selbe and Tuul rivers and beneath Bogd Khan Uul in 1778. Zanabazar established seven aimags (monastic departments) to oversee his religious institutions; the Department of the Treasury, Department of Administration, Department of Meals, Department of the Honored Doctor, Department of Amdo, Department of Orlog and the Department of Khuukhen Noyon. His authority was further substantiated in 1658 when he presided over a convocation of nobles at Erdene Zuu and a year later he conferred titles on nobles at Olziit Tsagaan Nuur. Nevertheless, despite being recognized as the undisputed spiritual leader of the Kalkha, Zanabazar's moral influence failed to overcome the Mongols’ traditional tribalism, both among various Khalkha tribes as well as the rivalry between the Khalkha and Oirat-Dzungar Mongols to the west.

=== Khalkha submission to Qing rule, 1686-1691 ===
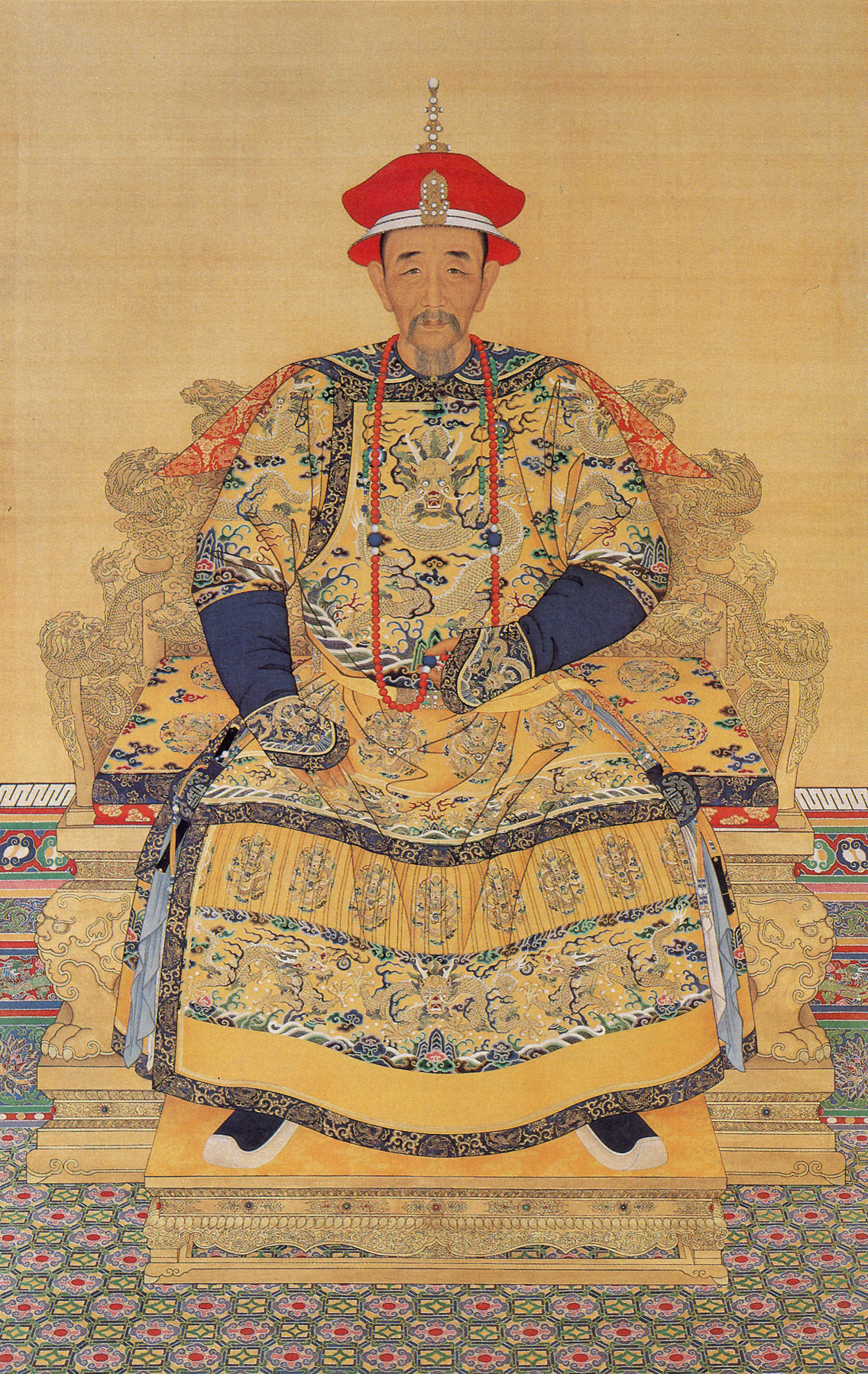
Kangxi Emperor

As tensions between Dzungar and Khalkha Mongols grew, Zanabazar attempted to pacify the Dzungar leader Galdan Boshugtu Khan with gifts of his artwork and sacred texts. In 1686 he attended a peace conference at the behest of the Kangxi Emperor to reach a reconciliation with the Dzungars. Despite these efforts, skirmishes and vendettas soon led to all-out war. As Galdan's forces swept eastward into Khalka territory in 1688, Zanabazar and nearly 20,000 Khalkha refugees fled south into present day Inner Mongolia to seek the protection of the Qing Emperor. In pursuit, Dzungar forces pillaged Erdene Zuu and destroyed several monasteries built by Zanabazar. Under Zanabazar's authority, the three Khalkha rulers declared themselves Qing vassals at Dolon Nor (the site of Shangdu, the pleasure palace of the Yuan Emperors) in 1691, a politically decisive step that officially ended the last remnants of the Yuan dynasty and allowed the Qing to assume the mantle of the Genghisid khans, merging the Khalkha forces into the Qing army. Motivated by the appeals of Zanabazar, whom he greatly admired, as well as the threat posed by a strong, unified Mongol state under Dzungar rule, the Kangxi Emperor dispatched Qing armies north to subdue the Galdan's forces.

=== Final years and death, 1691-1723 ===
From 1691 to 1701 Qing armies battled the Dzungars for control of Mongolia. Zanabazar remained in China, wintering in Beijing and passing his summers with the Kangxi Emperor at Jehol (Chengde) as his spiritual mentor. He returned to Khalkha Mongolia only once during this period, in 1699, to attend the funeral of his elder brother, Tüsheet Khan Chankhuundorj. The Kangxi Emperor designated Zanabazar “Da Lama”, “Great Lama”, and invited him on his pilgrimage to Wutaishan in 1698. Under Zanabazar's tutelage, the intensity of the Kangxi Emperor's Buddhist devotion notably increased after 1701.

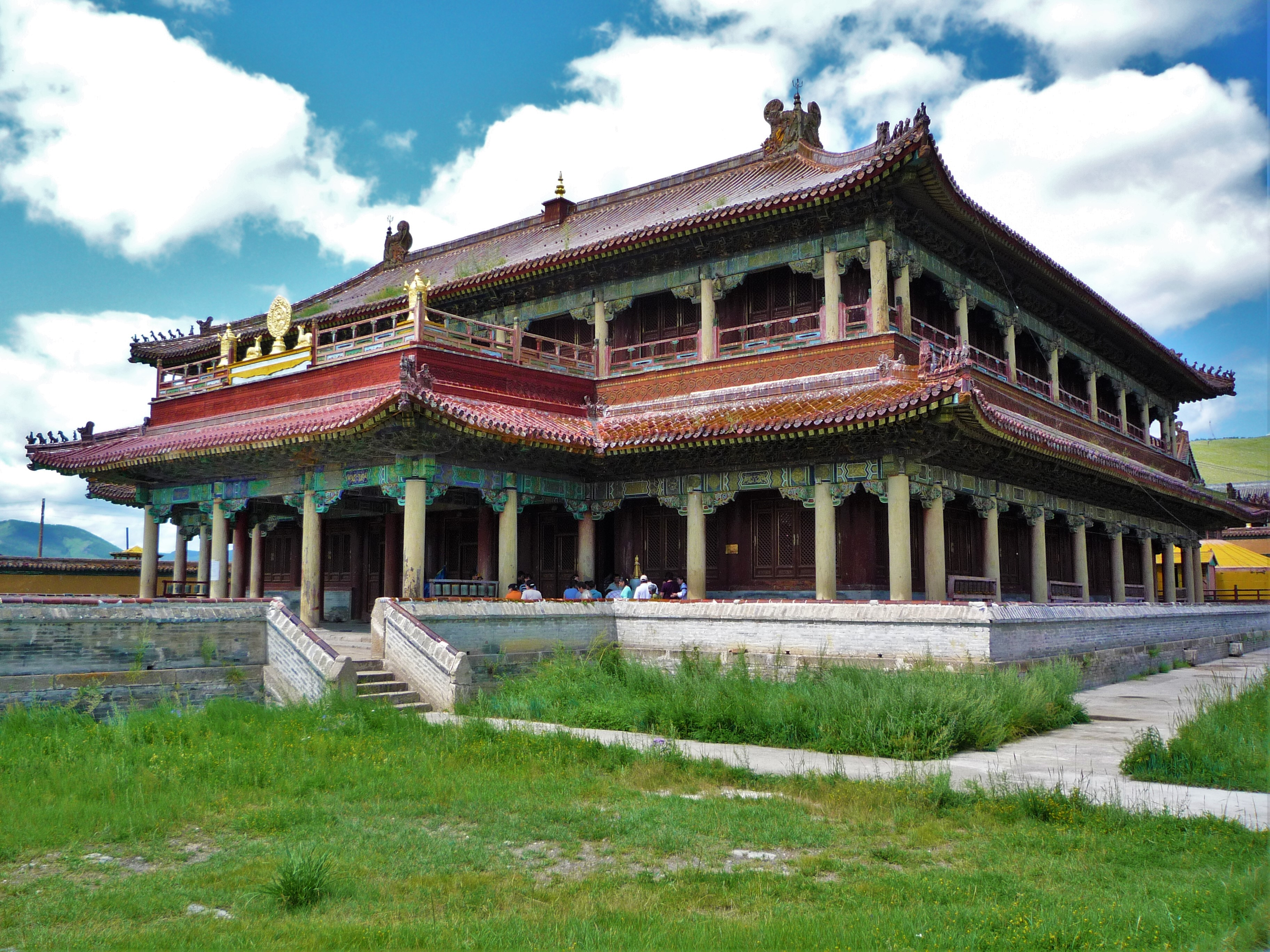
Amarbayasgalant

In 1697, Qing forces decisively defeated Galdan at the Battle of Jao Modo. At age 66, Zanabazar finally resettled in Khalkha Mongolia in 1701 to supervise restoration of the Erdene Zuu Monastery. Over the next several years he oversaw the building of more Buddhist monasteries in Mongolia while travelling to Beijing annually to meet with the Qing Emperor. Upon receiving news of the Kangxi Emperor's death on December 20, 1722, Zanabazar immediately journeyed to Beijing to conduct Buddhist rites at Beijing's Yellow Monastery (Huang si 黃寺). Zanabazar died himself (poisoned, some believe, by the new emperor) in Beijing only six weeks later, on February 18, 1723. He was 88 years old. His body was embalmed, returned to Mongolia and mummified. The Kangxi Emperor's son, the Yongzheng Emperor, ordered a Chinese-style monastery dedicated to Zanabazar's main tutelary deity, Maitreya, to be built at the place where the lama's traveling encampment had stood at the moment of his death. He pledged 100,000 liang of silver to the monastery's construction, which was not completed until a year after his own death in 1736. Amarbayasgalant Monastery or “Monastery of Blessed Peace,” resembles Yongzheng's own Yonghe Palace in Beijing. Zanabazar's body was finally laid to rest there in 1779.

In 1937, Amarbayasgalant Monastery was ransacked by Mongolian communists. Zanabazar's remains were allegedly removed and burned in the hills nearby.

== Artistic works ==
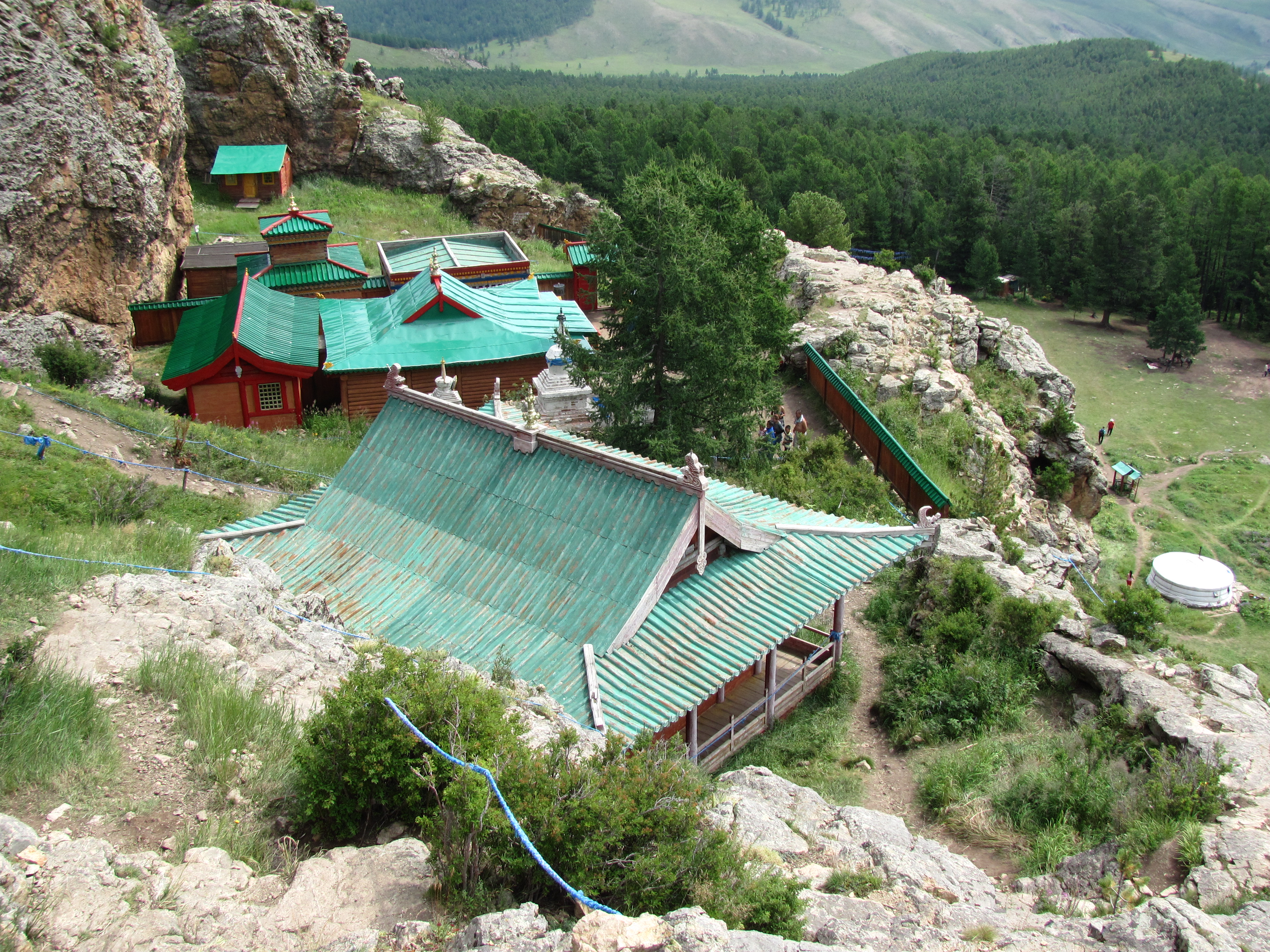
Tövkhön Monastery

At his height, Zanabazar was recognized as a sculptor par excellence among the Buddhist countries of Asia and the greatest sculptor of Mongolia He is sometimes referred to as the Michelangelo of Asia as he epitomized the Mongolian Renaissance. During his time in Tibet, Zanabazar came to admire the Nepali style of representational arts favored by the Gelug school and it profoundly influenced his own artistic development and style. Upon his return from Tibet in 1651 and 1656, he revived the art of metal image making in Mongolia, through carved images of various Buddhist gods from bronze or copper. By the 1670s and 1680s, he and his workshop of apprentices at Tövkhön Monastery were producing hundreds of artistic pieces used to populate the many monasteries and temples he founded and by extension were seen as vehicles to spread Buddhism beyond the confines of court circles to the lay masses. As his political influence grew, his artwork became a form of diplomacy, used in negotiations with the Dzungar leader Galdan Boshugtu Khan and to gain the favor of the Kangxi Emperor, paving the way for incorporation of outer Mongolia into Qing protectorate.

Soyombo Script

The vast majority of Zanabazar's artistic output came between his return from his first trip to Tibet in 1651 and the defeat of Khalkha armies by Dzungar Mongols in 1688. His greatest masterworks, including “Varajradhara”, Green Tara, White Tara 1685, Twenty One Taras, the Five Dhyani Buddhas, walking Maitreya and many others, were created in the mid-1680s at Tövkhön Monastery, his retreat outside of Erdene Zuu, originally called Bayasgalant Aglag Oron (Happy Secluded Place), Zanabazar's works are noted for their depiction of feminine beauty as well as his unique aesthetic vision of human physical perfection. His sculptures portray peaceful and contemplative female figures with facial features characterized by high foreheads, thin, arching eyebrows, high- bridged noses, and small, fleshy lips. Zanzabar also sculpted Buddhas and Bodhisattvas in deep meditation, which were later consecrated as sacred images.

Zanabazar established unique features for Mongolian Buddhism including Tibetan influenced yet redesigned lama robes, reworked melodies for chanting, and modifications of traditional ceremonies either in the melodies or by the introduction of new prayer texts which he composed.

In 1686 he designed the Soyombo script to facilitate cross translations between Mongolian, Tibetan, and Sanskrit. Today, the script is found mostly in historical texts and in religious and temple inscriptions. However, one special character of the script, the Soyombo symbol, later became a national symbol of Mongolia, and has appeared on the national flag since 1921, and on the Emblem of Mongolia since 1960, as well as money, stamps, etc.

Artistic Works of Zanabazar
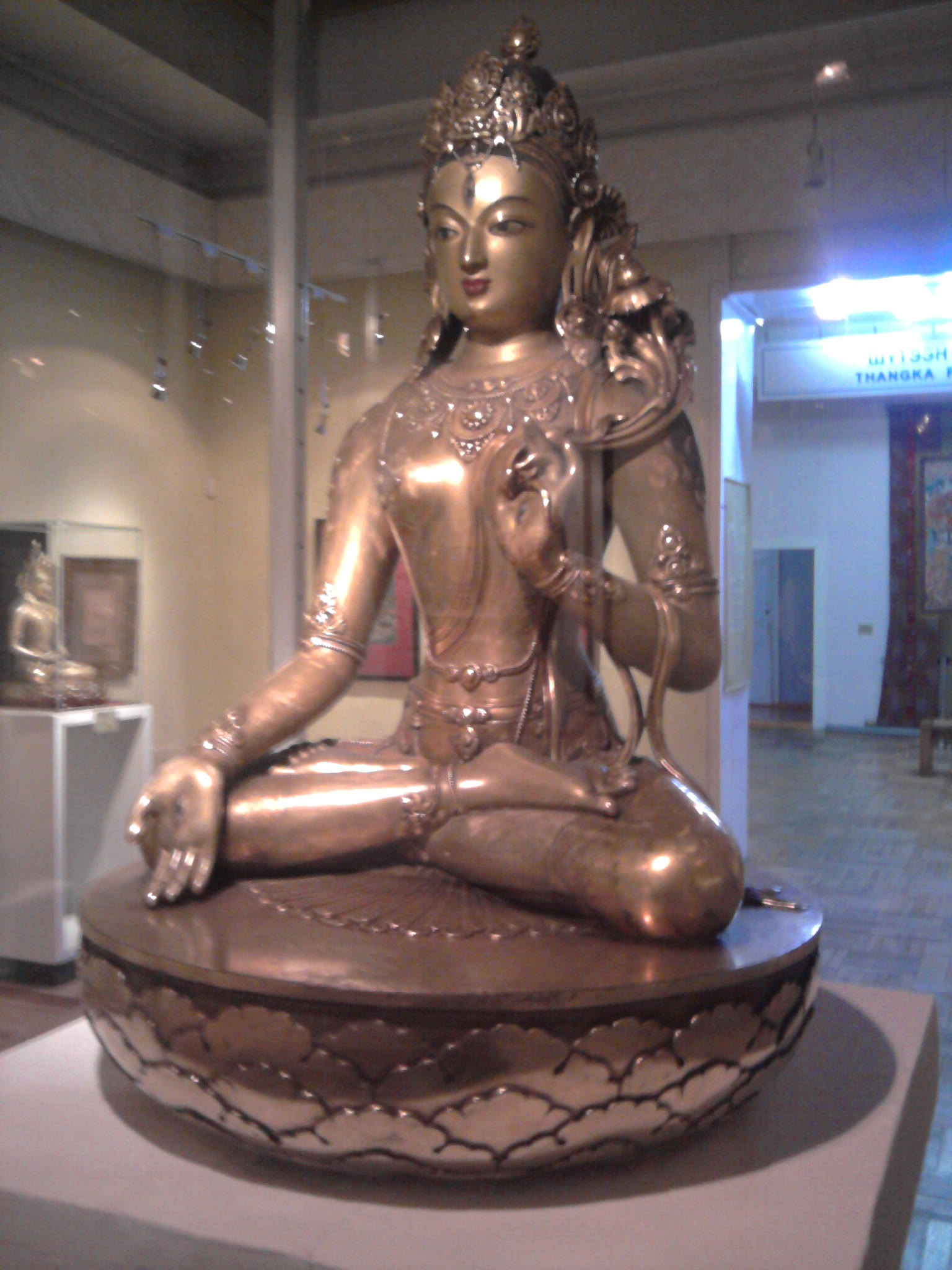
White Tara

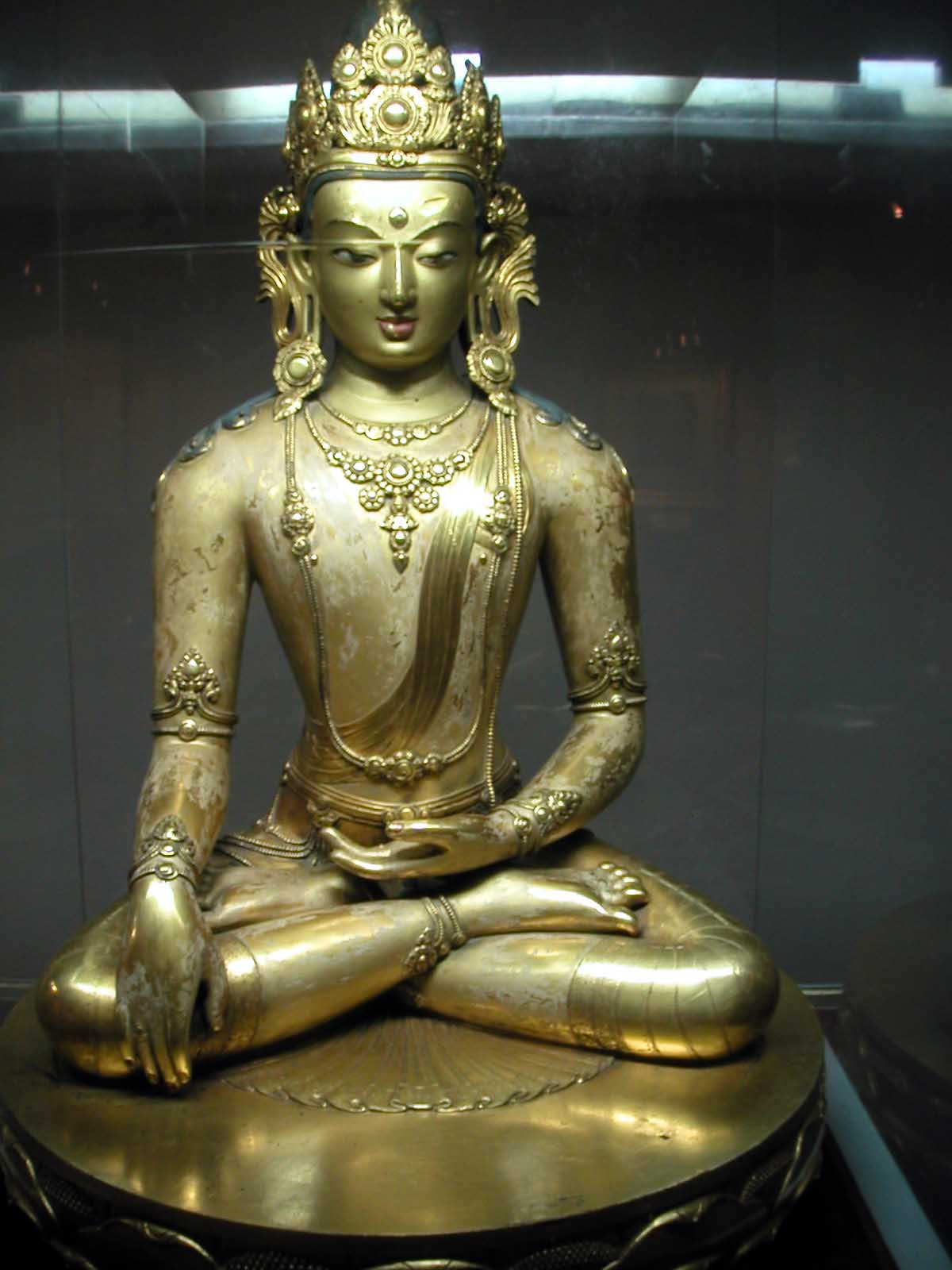
Statue of Akshobhya

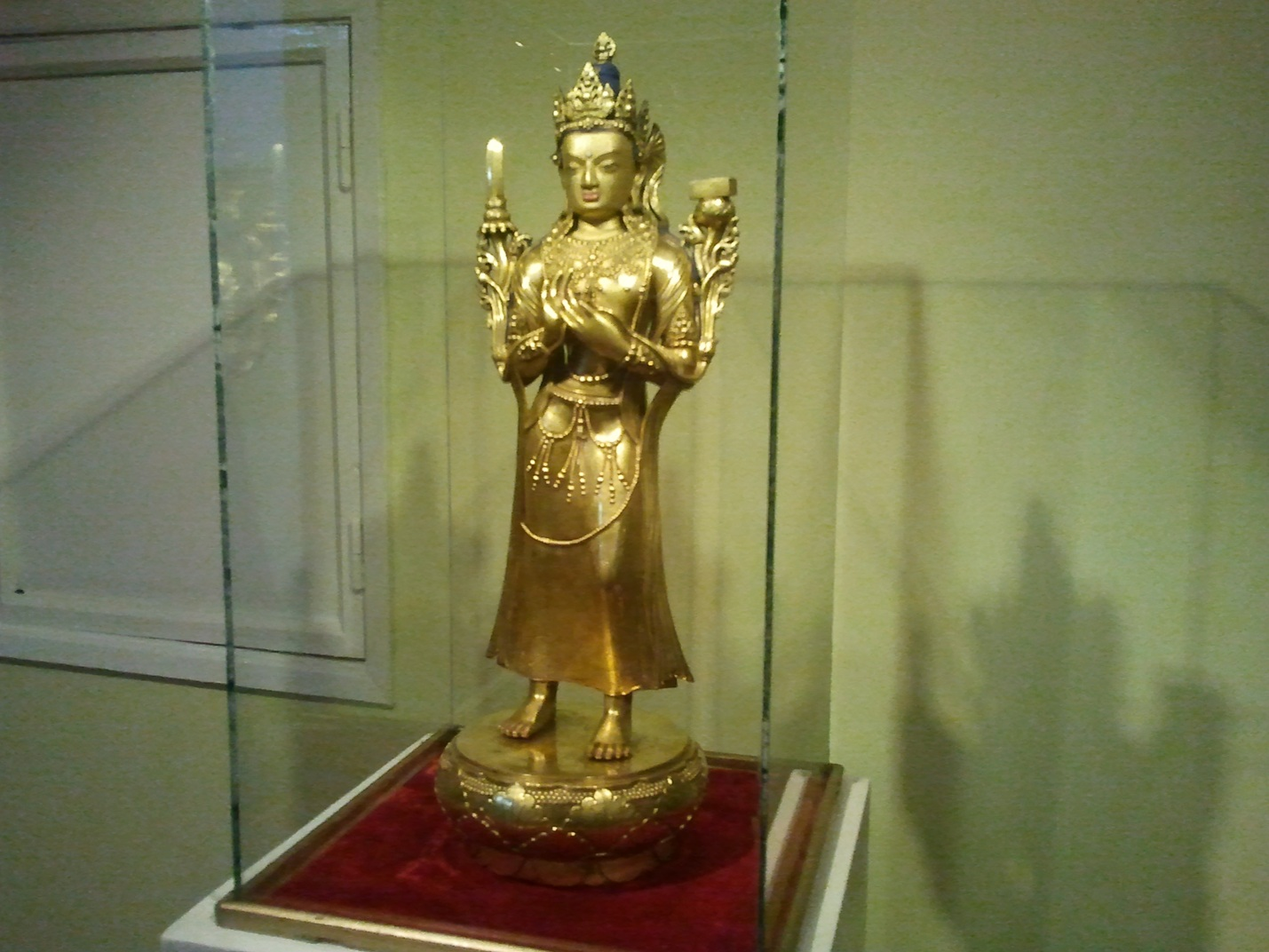
Statuette of Manjusri
Example 1

== Legacy ==
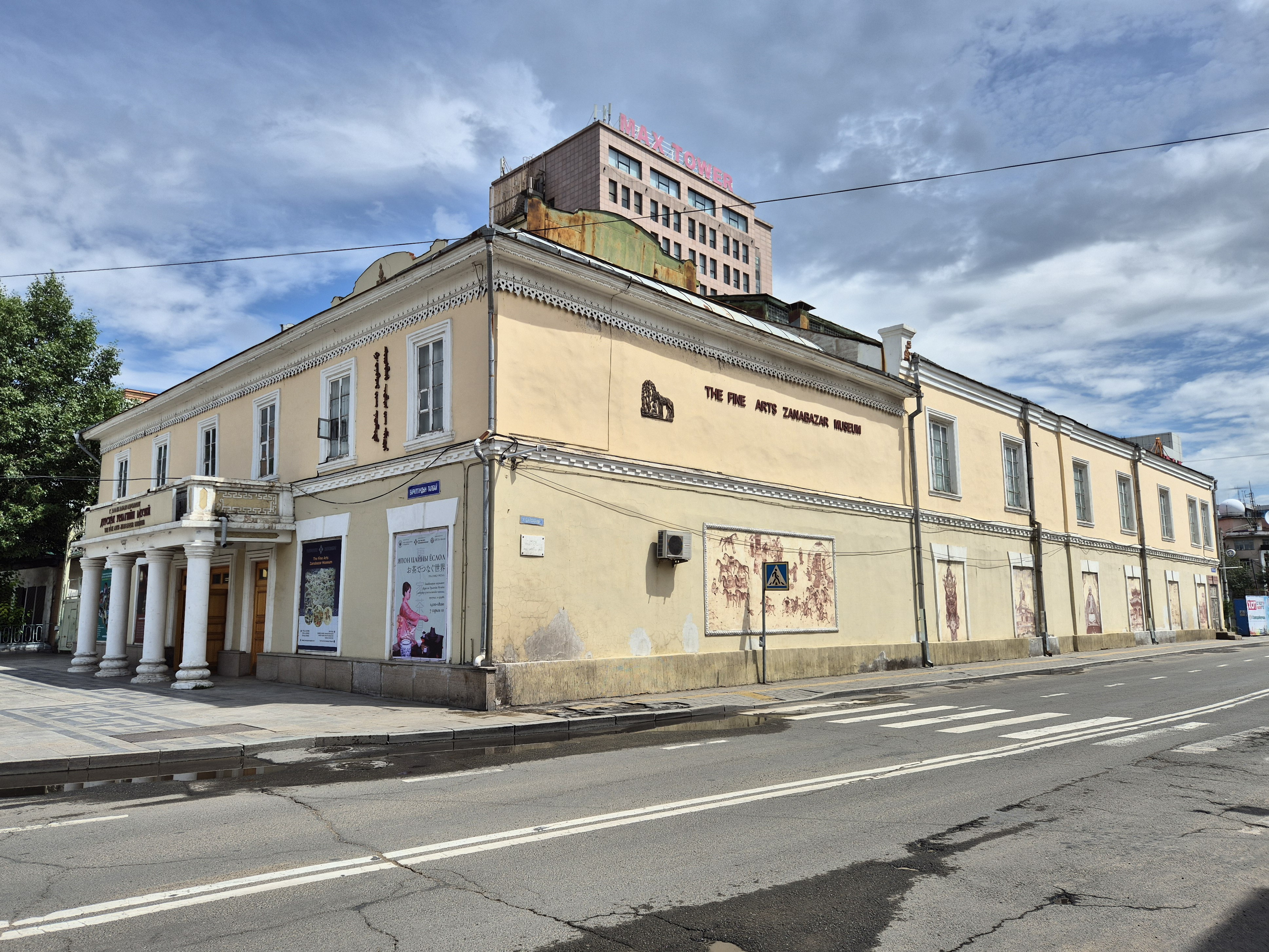
Zanabazar Museum

Today, Zanabazar is viewed as one of Mongolia's most prominent historical figures, celebrated for propagating Tibetan Buddhism throughout Mongolia while reshaping it to fit Mongolian sensibilities, thereby establishing for the Mongols a unique cultural identity. His artistic works are generally regarded as the apogee of Mongolian aesthetic development and spawned a cultural renaissance among Mongols in the late 17th century. Even during the country's socialist era (1921-1991) he was acknowledged to be as a prominent scholar (his religious roles quietly discarded) and recognized for his artistic and cultural achievements. As a political personality, however, socialist authorities portrayed Zanabazar as a traitor and deceiver of the masses, responsible for the loss of Mongolian sovereignty to the Manchu. In the post socialist era, however, there has been a reevaluation of his image to where his actions in negotiating the Khalkha's submission to the Qing are considered to have been in the long term interests of Mongolia, and he is generally exonerated for his role in 1691.

In 1965, the Fine Arts Zanabazar Museum was established in Ulaanbaatar, containing the largest collection of his works. Zanabazar Buddhist University was founded in 1970 in Ulaanbaatar and a major street Undur Gegen Zanabazar (Өндөр Гэгээн Занабазарын гудамж) is located in the center of the capital. In 2009 a genus of dinosaur Zanabazar, the remains of which were discovered in Mongolia, was named after him.

== See also ==
- Zanabazar square script – Abugida developed by the monk and scholar Zanabazar
