= Dulaankhaan, Selenge =

Bag in Shaamar, Selenge, Mongolia

Coordinates: 49°55′04″N 106°11′22″E

Dulaankhaan (Mongolian: Дулаанхаан) is a bag in Shaamar sum (district) of Selenge Province, Mongolia. It is 35 km (22 mi) southeast of Shaamar sum center, 50 km (31 mi) south (via Shaamar) of Sükhbaatar city, the capital of Selenge Province. Dulaankhaan is 60 km (37 mi) north of Darkhan city (Darkhan-Uul Province center).

As of 1994, the population was 1,997.

Dulaankhaan has a station on the Trans-Mongolian Railway.
