= Nomgon, Selenge =

Bag in Saikhan, Selenge, Mongolia

Coordinates: 49°11′57″N 105°39′59″E

Nomgon (Mongolian: Номгон) is a bag in Saikhan sum (district) of Selenge Province, Mongolia. In 2000, the settlement population was 2,200.
