= Shankh Monastery =

Monastery in Kharkhorin, Övörkhangai, Mongolia

Shankh Monastery Шанх хийд
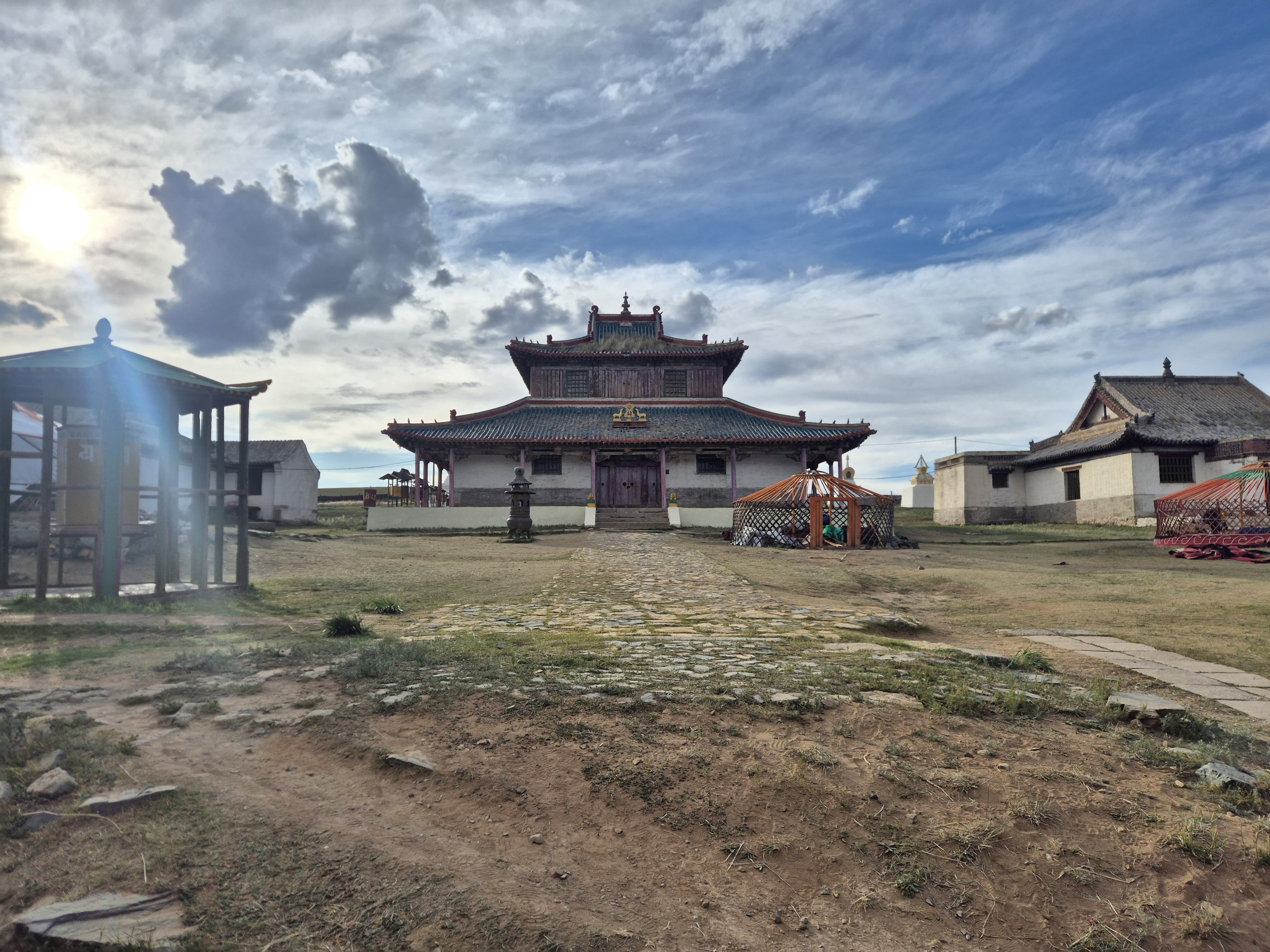

- Location within Mongolia

Religion
- Affiliation: Tibetan Buddhism

Location
- Location: Kharkhorin, Övörkhangai Province, Mongolia
- Country: Mongolia
- Interactive map of Shankh Monastery; Шанх хийд
- Coordinates: 47.0514°N 102.954°E

Architecture
- Style: Chinese, Mongol and Tibetan influences
- Established: 1647

Shankh Monastery (Mongolian: Шанх хийд, Shankh Khiid) is a monastery in Kharkhorin, Övörkhangai Province, Mongolia. It is one of Mongolia's oldest and most historically significant monasteries. It was founded in 1647 by Zanabazar, the first Jebtsundamba Khutuktu, or spiritual head of Tibetan Buddhism for the Khalkha in Outer Mongolia, around the same time as the establishment of the nearby Tövkhön Monastery.

The monastery belongs to the Gelupa, or Yellow Hat Sect, school of Tibetan Buddhism. Its main temple is famous for its seven Kalachakra Mandalas which portray all 722 Kalachakra deities, the only ones of their kind in Mongolia.

The meaning of the word shankh is unclear, with some speculating it refers to the small mountain range between the monastery and Erdene Zuu Monastery, while others claim it refers to “a group of objects arranged in a particular order”.

== History ==
Zanabazar founded Shankh Monastery in 1647 when he was just 12 years old. For many years it was known as the “Monastery of the West” (Baruun Khüree). It began as a ger monastery, and moved several times before settling in its current location in 1787 and taking on its current name. Nevertheless, a large number of monks continued to maintain the traveling camp until the late 19th century.

According to the Russian ethnographer Aleksei M. Pozdneev, who visited the monastery in 1892, in addition to the main temple, built between 1710 and 1790, it consisted of five large beautifully decorated gers that could accommodate nearly 200 people. It is said that the black military banner of Genghis Khan was housed at the monastery for a time, although the current whereabouts of the banner are unknown.

At its height the monastery included several schools that practiced Tantric rituals, especially Kalachakra, Buddhist philosophy and astrology. By 1921, the year of the Mongolian People's Revolution, it consisted of some 20 buildings and housed over 1500 monks.

Like most of Mongolia's religious centers, Shankh Monastery was closed down in 1937 and most of its standing structures destroyed by the country's communist regime as part of violent Stalinist purges. Many of its monks were executed or sent to labor camps in Siberia while 5 young novices were permitted to return to their families. The main temple, which had escaped major damage, was later used as a warehouse. Fortunately, most of the monastery's precious relics were removed and hidden away by one of the young novices, Gombo, and thus survived the destruction of the monastery.

== Restoration ==
After the 1990 Democratic Revolution in Mongolia, the surviving novices returned to Shankh and began restoration efforts on the main temple. In 1993, the 14th Dalai Lama sent three monks to Shankh as part of efforts to again cultivate Buddhism in the country.
