= Khötöl, Selenge =

Bag in Saikhan, Selenge, Mongolia

Coordinates: 49°05′46″N 105°33′09″E

Mongolian name
- Mongolian Cyrillic: Хөтөл
- Mongolian script: ᠬᠥᠲᠥᠯ
Transcriptions
- SASM/GNC: Khötöl

Khötöl (Mongolian: Хөтөл) is a bag in Saikhan sum (district) of Selenge Province, Mongolia. The cement production plant is in the town.
