= Javkhlant =

Javkhlant may refer to:

- Javkhlant, Selenge, a sum of Selenge Province, Mongolia
- Sümber, Töv (also known as Javkhlant), a sum of Töv Province, Mongolia
- Uliastai (sometimes known as Javkhlant, a city in Zavkhan Province, Mongolia
- Javkhlant Formation, where the Haya dinosaur was discovered
