= Orkhon, Selenge =

District in Selenge Province, Mongolia

Coordinates: 49°08′43″N 105°23′46″E

Orkhon District Орхон сум ᠣᠷᠬᠤᠨᠰᠤᠮᠤ
- District
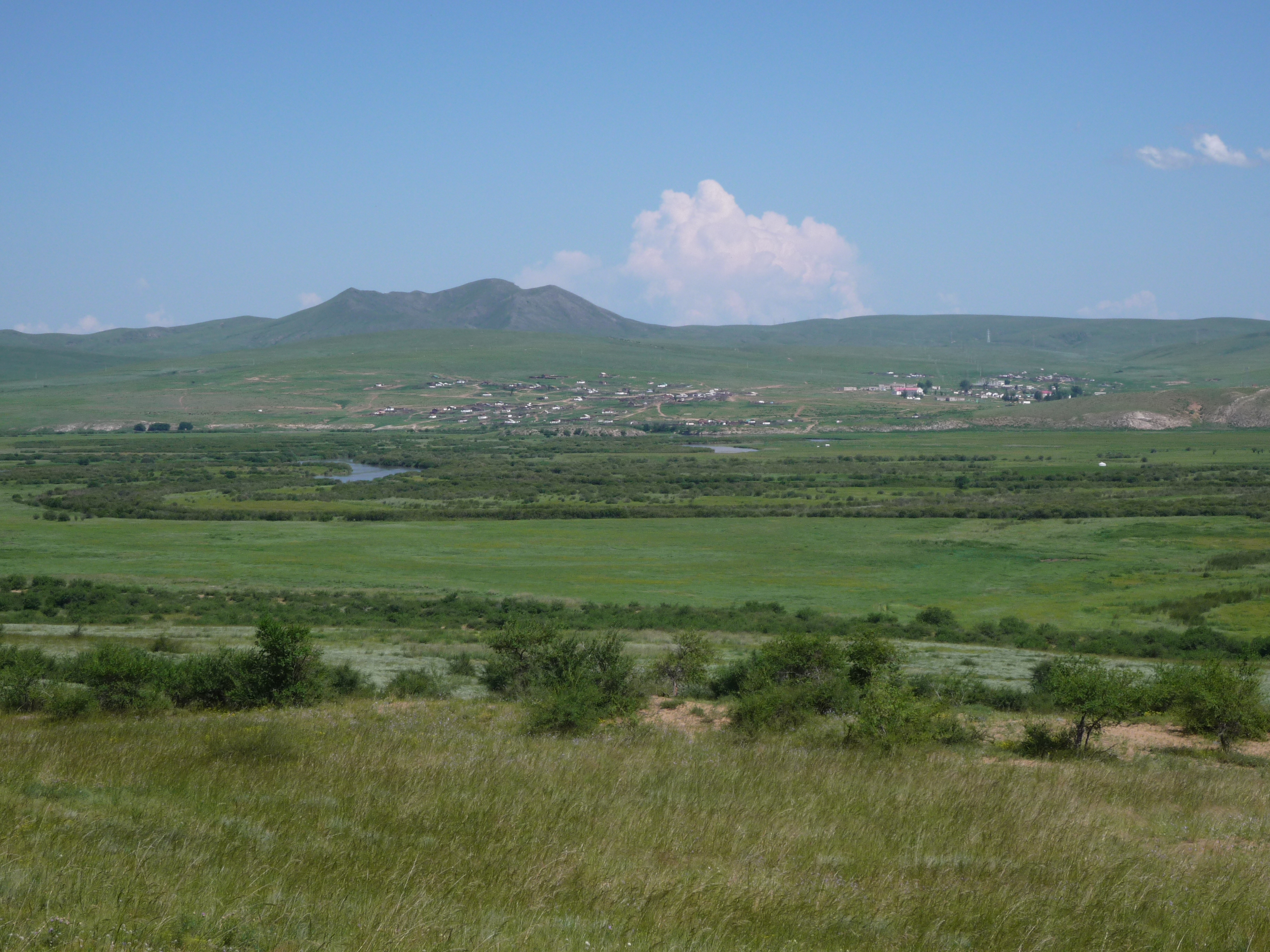
- Interactive map of Orkhon District
- Country: Mongolia
- Province: Selenge Province

Area
  - Total: 1,306.27 km^{2} (504.35 sq mi)
- Time zone: UTC+8 (UTC + 8)

Orkhon (Mongolian: Орхон) is a sum (district) of Selenge Province in northern Mongolia. In 2008, its population was 2,165.

== Administrative divisions ==
The district is divided into two bags, which are:

- Belendalai
- Orkhon
