= Baruunbüren =

District in Selenge Province, Mongolia

Coordinates: 49°10′12″N 104°50′12″E

Baruunbüren District Баруунбүрэн сум ᠪᠠᠷᠠᠭᠤᠨᠪᠦ᠋ᠷᠢᠨᠰᠤᠮᠤ
- District
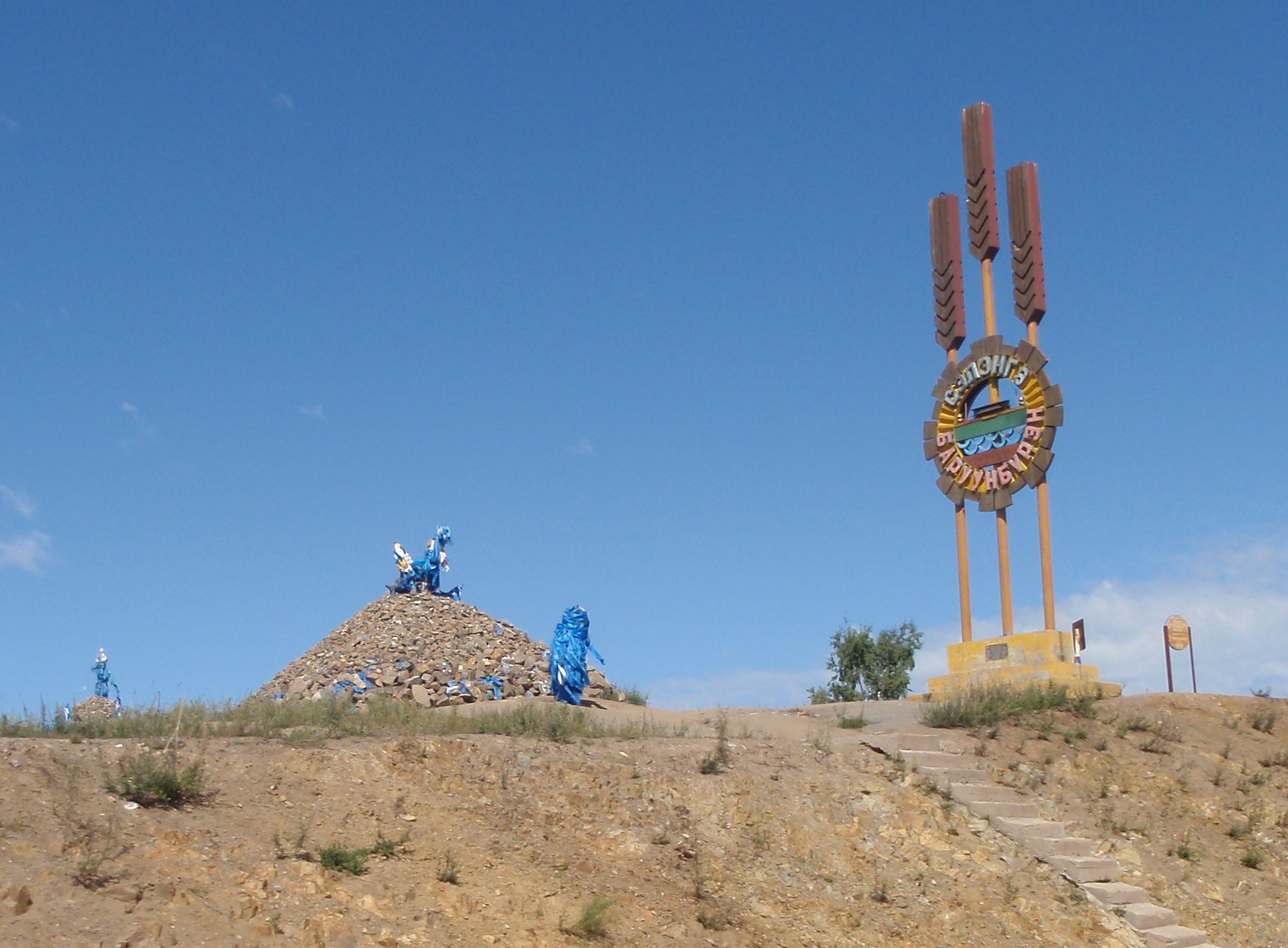
- Baruunbüren - Symbol at the district entrance

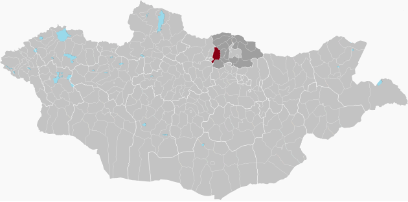
- Baruunbüren District in Selenge Province
- Country: Mongolia
- Province: Selenge Province

Area
  - Total: 2,814.54 km^{2} (1,086.70 sq mi)
- Time zone: UTC+8 (UTC + 8)
- Climate: Dwb
- Website: http://baruunburen.se.gov.mn/

Baruunbüren (Mongolian: Баруунбүрэн "Fully Eastern") is a sum (district) of Selenge Province in northern Mongolia. Amarbayasgalant Monastery is located 48 km NE from the sum center. In 2008, its population was 2,702.

== Administrative divisions ==
The district is divided into three bags, which are:

- Burgaltai
- Iven
- Tsagaan-Ovoo

== Tourist attractions ==
- Amarbayasgalant Monastery
