= Khüder =

District in Selenge Province, Mongolia

Coordinates: 49°46′35″N 107°30′58″E

Khüder District Хүдэр сум ᠬᠦᠳᠡᠷᠢᠰᠤᠮᠤ
- District
- Interactive map of Khüder District
- Country: Mongolia
- Province: Selenge Province

Area
  - Total: 2,838.65 km^{2} (1,096.01 sq mi)
- Time zone: UTC+8 (UTC + 8)

Khüder (Mongolian: Хүдэр "Musk Deer") is a sum (district) of Selenge Province in northern Mongolia. In 2008, its population was 2,078.

== Administrative divisions ==
The district is divided into two bags, which are:

- Bayantsagaan
- Tarvagatai
