= Züünbüren =

District in Selenge Province, Mongolia

Coordinates: 50°04′11″N 105°53′23″E

Züünbüren District Зүүнбүрэн сум ᠵᠡᠭᠦᠨᠪᠦ᠋ᠷᠢᠨᠰᠤᠮᠤ
- District
- Interactive map of Züünbüren District
- Country: Mongolia
- Province: Selenge Province

Area
  - Total: 1,204.94 km^{2} (465.23 sq mi)
- Time zone: UTC+8 (UTC + 8)

Züünbüren (Mongolian: Зүүнбүрэн) is a sum (district) of Selenge Province in northern Mongolia. In 2008, its population was 2,468.

== Administrative divisions ==
The district is divided into three bags, which are:

- Belchir
- Jargalant
- Mangirt
