= Saikhan, Selenge =

District in Selenge Province, Mongolia

Coordinates: 49°05′47″N 105°33′13″E

Saikhan District Сайхан сум ᠰᠠᠶᠢᠬᠠᠨᠰᠤᠮᠤ
- District
- Interactive map of Saikhan District
- Country: Mongolia
- Province: Selenge Province

Area
  - Total: 1,311.87 km^{2} (506.52 sq mi)
- Time zone: UTC+8 (UTC + 8)

Saikhan (Mongolian: Сайхан, beautiful) is a sum (district) of the Selenge Province in northern Mongolia. The center of the sum is the Khötöl city. The Nomgon urban-type settlement is 14 km NE from Khötöl.

== History ==
Saikhan District was established in 1977 and total square meters is around 137.5. The city was established to support the Khutul lime mine and cement plant. It is bordered by Darkhan-Uul province, Bayangol district, Orkhon Province and Hushaat District. Saikhan district has approximately 8795 population and 2068 householders living there. Eventually the official name of the 'Khotol' town was established in 1984.

== Geography ==
The Khotol town is 260 km away from the Capital city Ulanbator, 165 km from Sukhbaatar province, Darkhan-Uul Province it 58 km and 148 км from Orkhon Province.

== Administrative divisions ==
The district is divided into four bags, which are:

- Dumbun
- Gavshgai
- Khötöl
- Nomgon

== Transportation ==
The town is a stop on a branch line of the Trans-Mongolian Railway connecting the copper mine in Erdenet.
