= Sant, Selenge =

District in Selenge Province, Mongolia

Coordinates: 49°14′54″N 105°22′49″E

Sant District Сант сум ᠰᠠᠩᠲᠤᠰᠤᠮᠤ
- District
- Interactive map of Sant District
- Country: Mongolia
- Province: Selenge Province

Area
  - Total: 1,387.06 km^{2} (535.55 sq mi)
- Time zone: UTC+8 (UTC + 8)

Sant (Mongolian: Сант) is a sum (district) of Selenge Province in northern Mongolia. In 2008, its population was 2,056.

== Administrative divisions ==
The district is divided into two bags, which are:

- Iven
- Khushaat
