= Tsagaannuur, Selenge =

District in Selenge Province, Mongolia

Coordinates: 50°06′54″N 105°26′46″E

Tsagaannuur District Цагааннуур сум ᠴᠠᠭᠠᠨᠨᠠᠭᠤᠷᠰᠤᠮᠤ
- District
- Interactive map of Tsagaannuur District
- Country: Mongolia
- Province: Selenge Province

Area
  - Total: 3,814.72 km^{2} (1,472.87 sq mi)
- Time zone: UTC+8 (UTC + 8)

Tsagaannuur (Mongolian: Цагааннуур, white lake) is a sum (district) of Selenge Province in northern Mongolia. In 2008, its population was 4,257.

== Administrative divisions ==
The district is divided into three bags, which are:

- Khuurch
- Orgikh
- Tiireg
