= Khushaat =

District in Selenge Province, Mongolia

Coordinates: 49°40′34″N 105°49′49″E

Khushaat District Хушаат сум ᠬᠠᠰᠢᠶ᠋ᠠᠲᠤᠰᠤᠮᠤ
- District
- Interactive map of Khushaat District
- Country: Mongolia
- Province: Selenge Province

Area
  - Total: 2,010.15 km^{2} (776.12 sq mi)
- Time zone: UTC+8 (UTC + 8)

Khushaat (Mongolian: Хушаат) is a sum (district) of Selenge Province in northern Mongolia. In 2008, its population was 1,585.

== Administrative divisions ==
The district is divided into two bags, which are:

- Daagat
- Munkhtolgoi
