= Yesönzüil, Övörkhangai =

District in Övörkhangai Province, Mongolia

Coordinates: 46°45′27″N 103°31′10″E

Yesönzüil District Есөнзүйл сум ᠶ᠋ᠢᠰᠦᠨᠵᠦᠢᠯᠰᠤᠮᠤ
- District
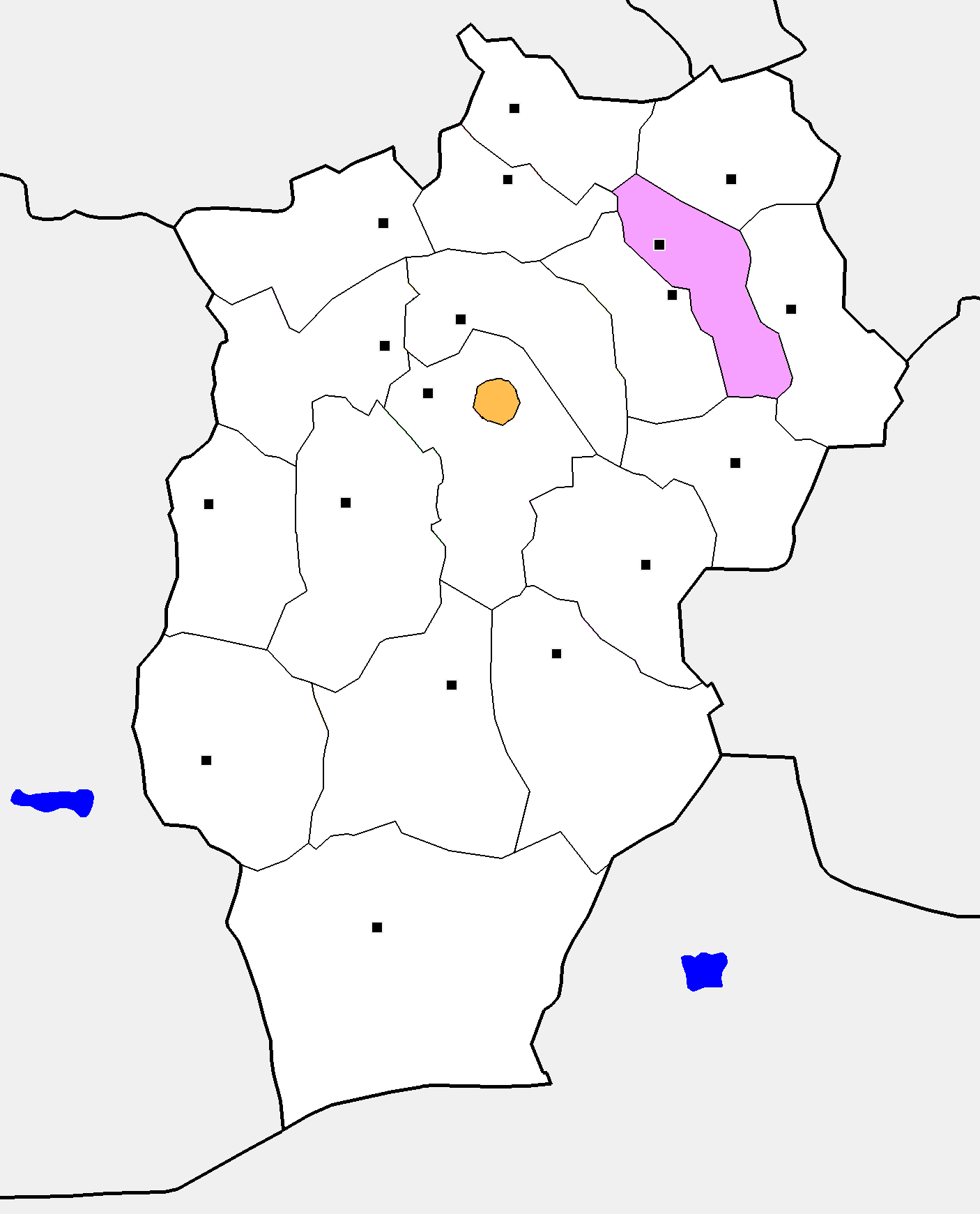
- Yesönzüil District in Övörkhangai Province
- Country: Mongolia
- Province: Övörkhangai Province
- Time zone: UTC+8 (UTC + 8)

Yesönzüil (Mongolian: Есөнзүйл "Nine Kinds") is a sum (district) of Övörkhangai Province in southern Mongolia. In 2008, its population was 3,422.

== Administrative divisions ==
The district is divided into four bags, which are:

- Ereen
- Khairkhan
- Munkhbulag
- Takhilga
