= Shaamar, Selenge =

District of Selene Province, Mongolia

Coordinates: 50°04′47″N 106°10′57″E

Shaamar District Шаамар сум ᠱᠠᠮᠠᠷᠰᠤᠮᠤ
- District
- Interactive map of Shaamar District
- Country: Mongolia
- Province: Selenge Province

Area
  - Total: 671.91 km^{2} (259.43 sq mi)
- Time zone: UTC+8 (UTC + 8)

Shaamar (Mongolian: Шаамар) is a sum (district) of Selenge Province in northern Mongolia. The Dulaankhaan urban-type settlement is 35 km S from Shaamar sum center. In 2008, its population was 4,158.

The sum center settlement of Shaamar is divided into two parts, about 8 miles apart. Upper Shaamar is located on a flat part of a hill and lower Shaamar on the banks of the Selenge River. Lower Shaamar has access to the railway station and water from the river.

Shaamar was established as a negdel (agricultural cooperative) during the agricultural movement of the 1930s in Mongolia. Today, the local economy is mainly supported by vegetables, cattle, pork, poultry, and lumber.

== Administrative divisions ==
The district is divided into three bags, which are:

- Delgerkhaan
- Dulaankhaan
- Okhindii
