= Tövkhön Monastery =

Buddhist monastery in Övörkhangai, Mongolia

Tövkhön Monastery Төвхөн хийд
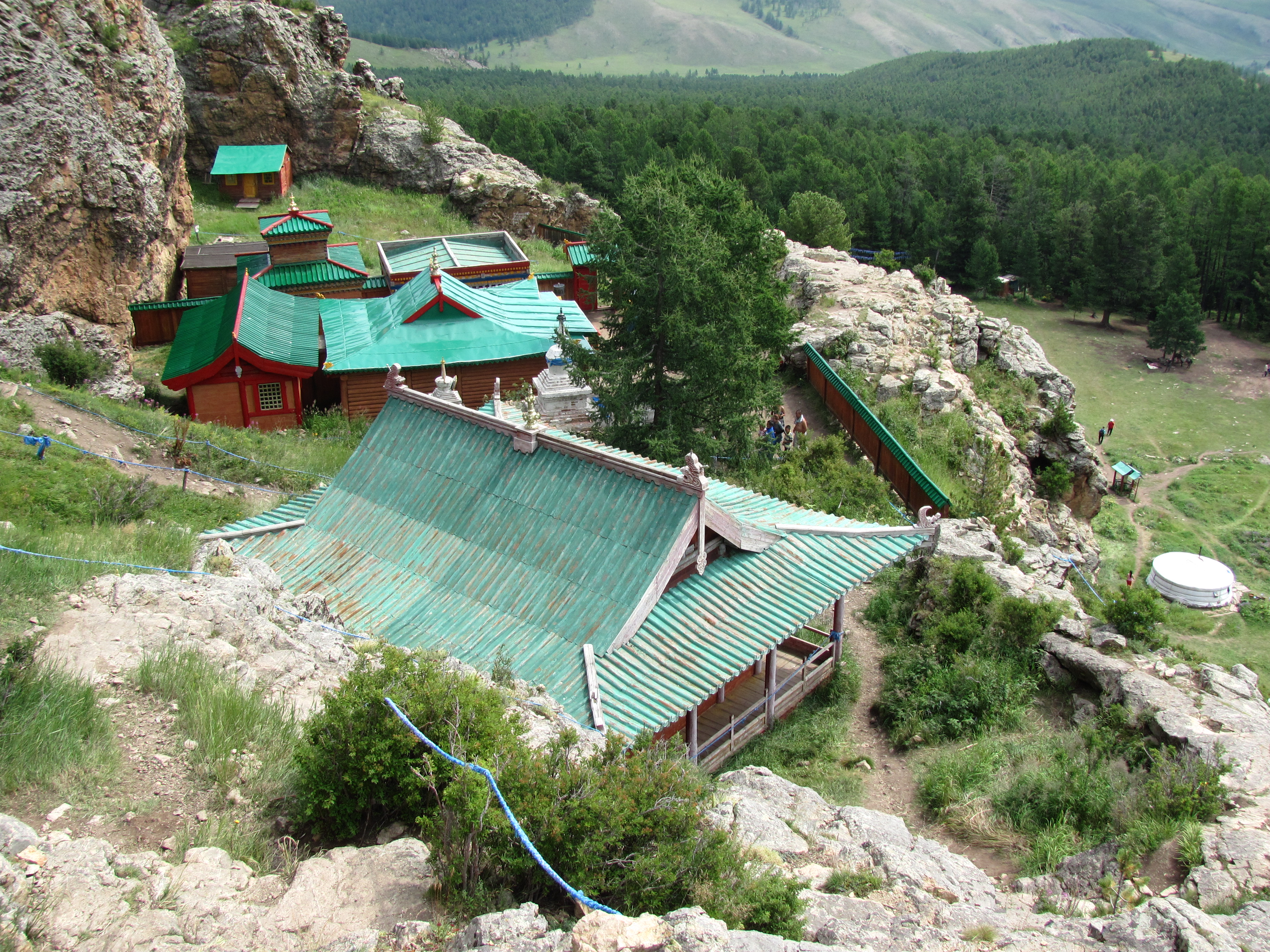

- Location within Mongolia

Religion
- Affiliation: Tibetan Buddhism

Location
- Location: Övörkhangai, Mongolia
- Country: Mongolia
- Interactive map of Tövkhön Monastery; Төвхөн хийд
- Coordinates: 47.012215°N 102.254992°E

Architecture
- Style: Chinese, Mongol and Tibetan influences
- Founder: Zanabazar
- Established: 1648

Tövkhön Monastery (Mongolian: Төвхөн хийд), one of Mongolia's oldest Buddhist monasteries, is located in Övörkhangai Province, Mongolia, about 47 km (29 mi) southwest of Kharkhorin.

The monastery was first established in 1648, by the then-14-year-old Zanabazar, the first Jebtsundamba Khutuktu and spiritual head of Tibetan Buddhism for the Khalkha in Outer Mongolia. He determined that the location on the Shireet Ulaan Uul mountain, overlooking a hill at 2,600 meters above sea-level, was an auspicious location. The first physical structures were built upon his return from studying in Tibet in 1653. Zanabazar, who was a gifted sculptor, painter, and musician, used the monastery, originally called Bayasgalant Aglag Oron (Happy Secluded Place), as his personal retreat over the course of 30 years. While there he created many of his most famous works. It was also where he developed the soyombo script.

The monastery was destroyed in 1688 by the Oirat Mongols, during their military campaign against Eastern Khalkha Mongols. Restored in 1773, the monastery suffered severe damage during the Stalinist purges of the late 1930s, as Mongolia's communist regime sought to destroy the Buddhist religion in the country.

Religious activities at the monastery restarted in 1992, and restoration of the monastery's grounds was completed in 1997. Two original temples and two stupas from the 17th century still stand, along with additional temples built in the 18th century. Ceremonies were staged to re-consecrate the monastery and a new statue of Gombo Makhagal (Mahakala) was carved and placed there. The monastery was inscribed as a UNESCO World Cultural Heritage site, in 1996. Several monks now reside and practice at the monastery full-time.

== Gallery ==
Tövkhön Monastery

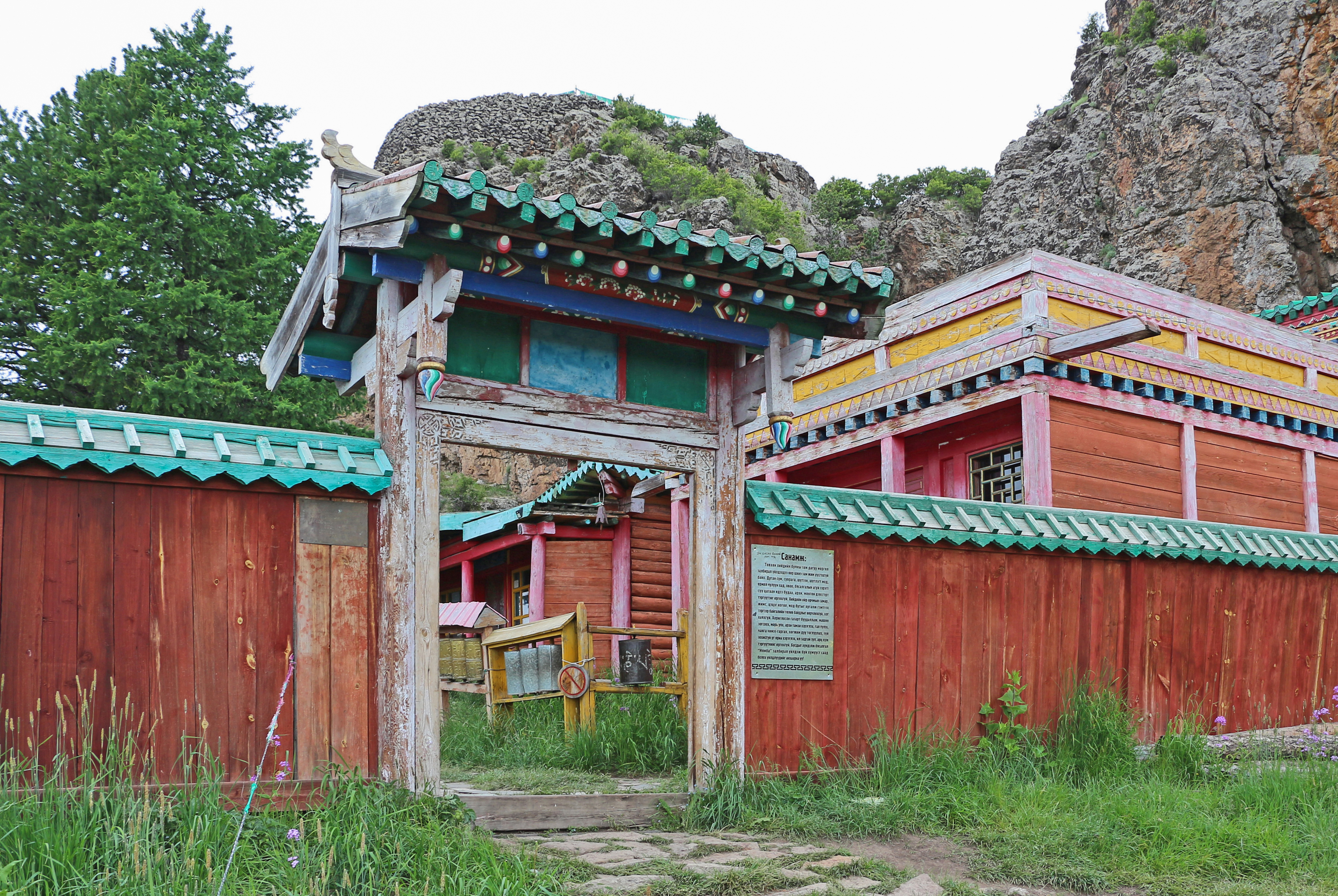
Entrance

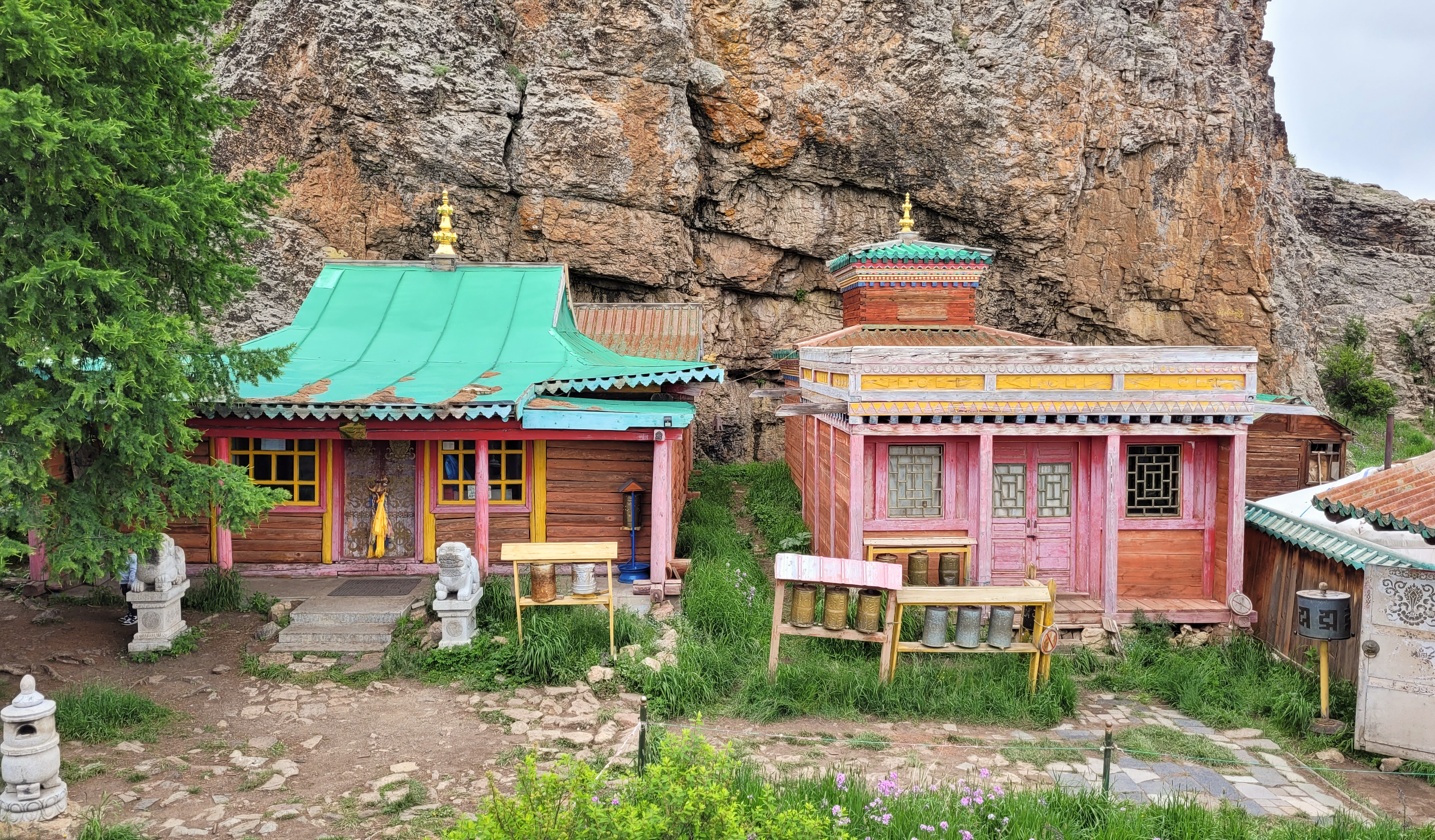
Tövkhön Monastery

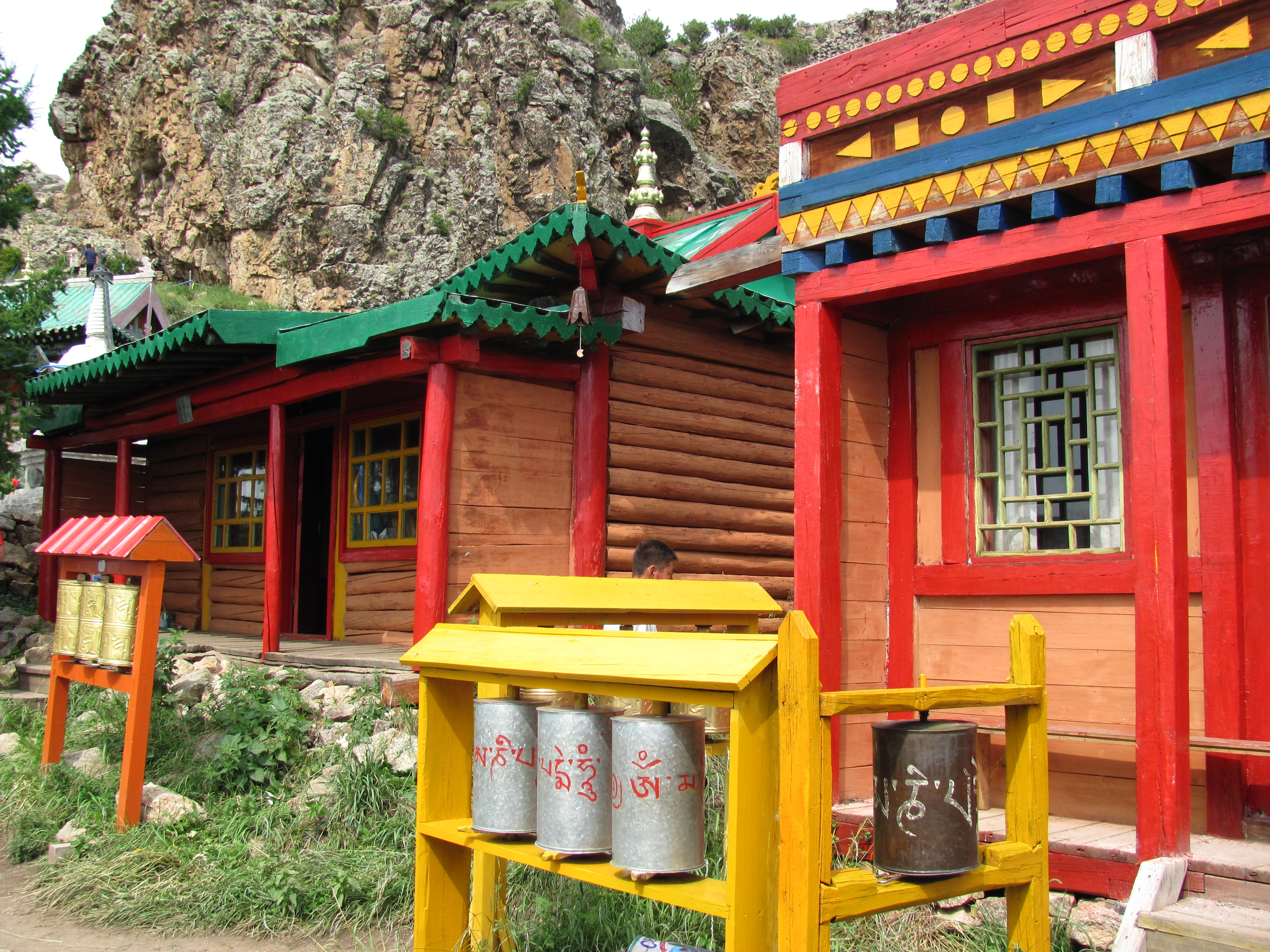
Tövkhön Monastery

Zanabazar's name in soyombo script

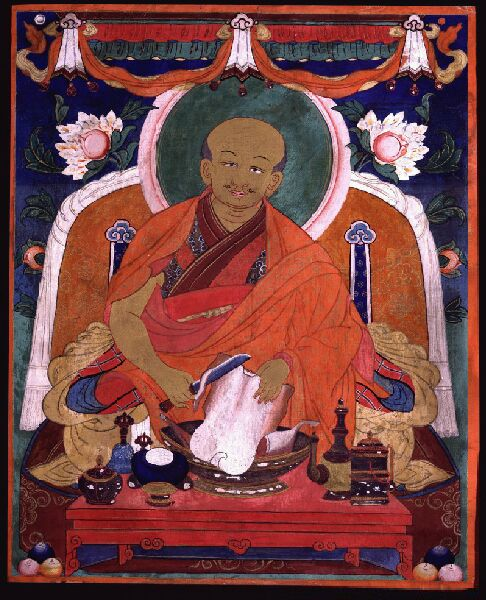
Depiction of Zanabazar

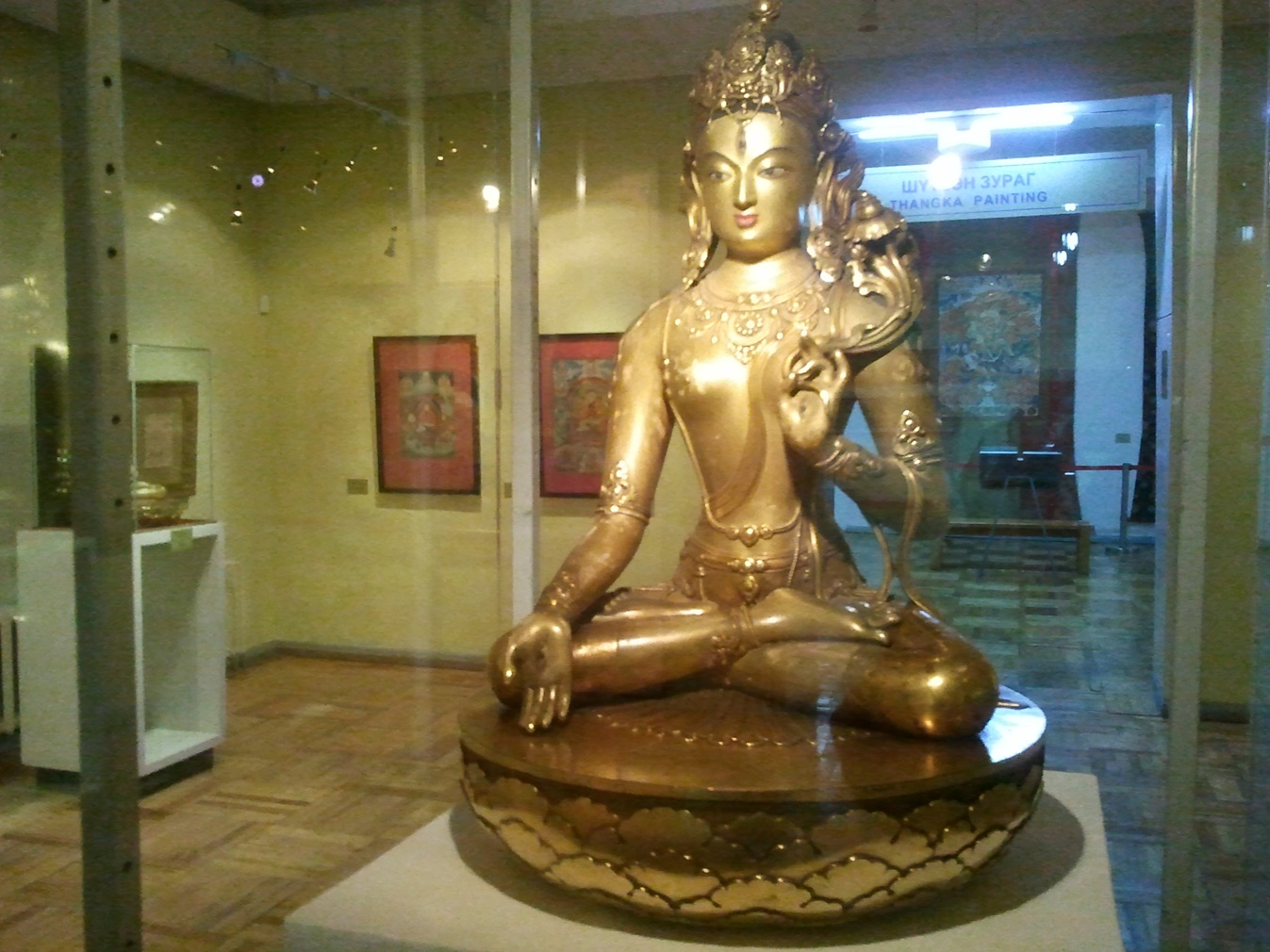
White Tara: Sculpted by Zanabazar
