= Bayangol, Selenge =

District in Selenge Province, Mongolia

Bayangol District Баянгол сум ᠪᠠᠶ᠋ᠠᠩᠭ᠋ᠣᠤᠯᠰᠤᠮᠤ
- District
- Location in Mongolia
- Coordinates: 48°54′53″N 106°5′15″E
- Country: Mongolia
- Province: Selenge Province

Area
  - Total: 1,976.28 km^{2} (763.05 sq mi)
- Elevation: 760 m (2,490 ft)

Population (2008)
  - Total: 5,028
- Time zone: UTC+8 (UTC + 8)
- Climate: Dwb

Bayangol (Mongolian: Баянгол, Mongolian: rich river) is a sum (district) of Selenge Province in northern Mongolia. The capital town of the district is officially named Baruunkharaa. In 2008, its population was 5,028.

== Administrative divisions ==
The district is divided into three bags, which are:

- Khan Shakhait
- Shar Tal
- Ulziit

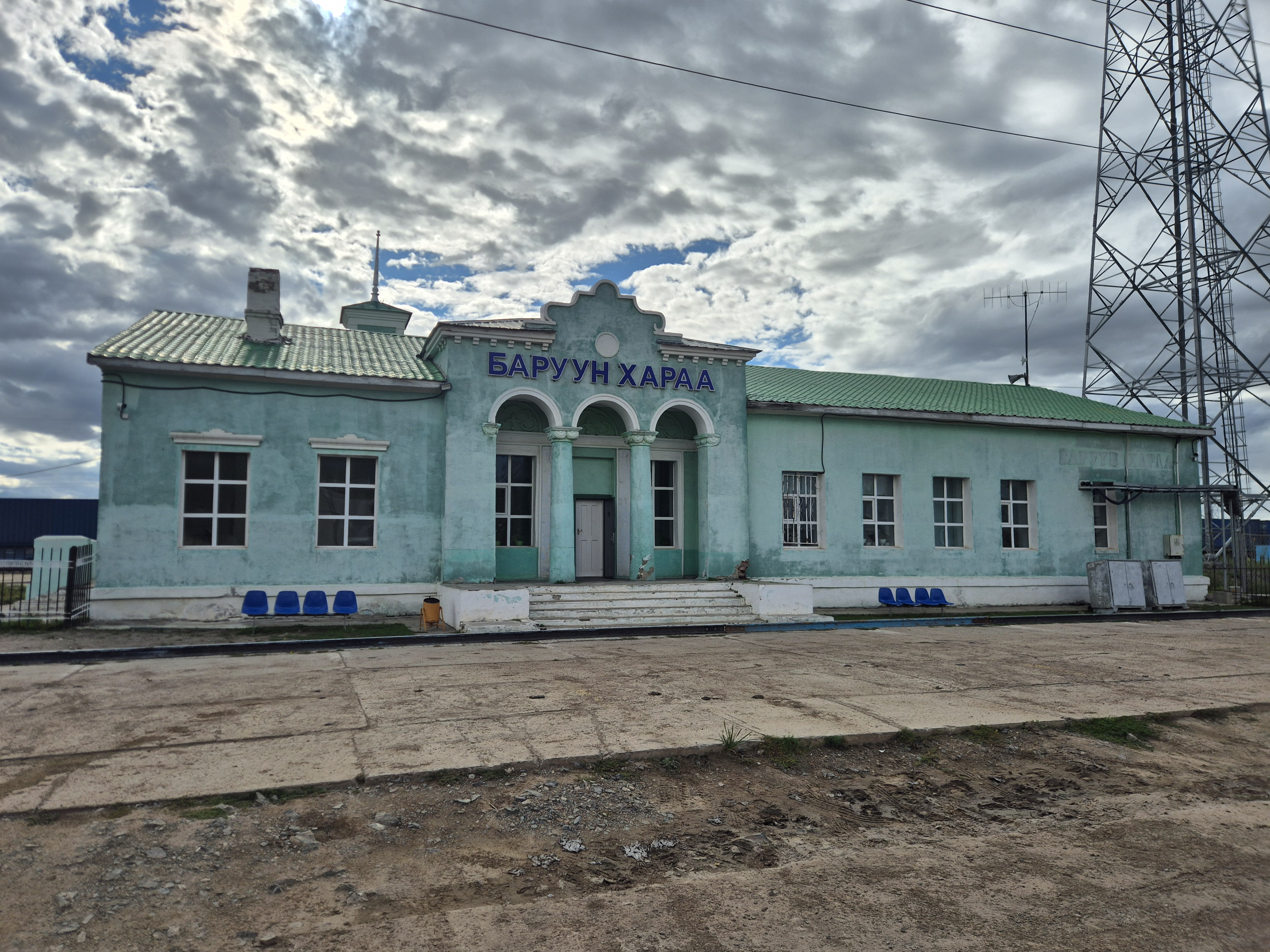
Baruunkharaa Railway Station

== Climate ==
Bayangol has a humid continental climate (Köppen climate classification Dwb) with warm summers and severely cold winters. Most precipitation falls in the summer as rain, with some snow in the adjacent months of May and September. Winters are mostly dry, with occasional snowfalls.

Climate data for Baruunkharaa (Bayangol), elevation 809 m (2,654 ft), (1991–2020 normals, extremes 1940–present)
Month	Jan	Feb	Mar	Apr	May	Jun	Jul	Aug	Sep	Oct	Nov	Dec	Year
Record high °C (°F)	2.0 (35.6)	12.6 (54.7)	21.8 (71.2)	33.2 (91.8)	36.0 (96.8)	40.2 (104.4)	43.2 (109.8)	41.0 (105.8)	33.8 (92.8)	28.0 (82.4)	17.5 (63.5)	6.4 (43.5)	43.2 (109.8)
Mean daily maximum °C (°F)	−17.8 (0.0)	−10.6 (12.9)	1.4 (34.5)	11.0 (51.8)	19.6 (67.3)	24.3 (75.7)	27.1 (80.8)	23.3 (73.9)	18.2 (64.8)	9.7 (49.5)	−3.0 (26.6)	−13.9 (7.0)	7.4 (45.4)
Daily mean °C (°F)	−24.7 (−12.5)	−19.0 (−2.2)	−6.2 (20.8)	4.5 (40.1)	11.7 (53.1)	18.1 (64.6)	20.5 (68.9)	17.9 (64.2)	11.0 (51.8)	1.4 (34.5)	−10.5 (13.1)	−20.9 (−5.6)	0.3 (32.6)
Mean daily minimum °C (°F)	−30.1 (−22.2)	−25.8 (−14.4)	−14.6 (5.7)	−4.6 (23.7)	2.7 (36.9)	9.2 (48.6)	13.7 (56.7)	11.4 (52.5)	3.2 (37.8)	−6.1 (21.0)	−17.6 (0.3)	−27.0 (−16.6)	−7.1 (19.2)
Record low °C (°F)	−47 (−53)	−43.9 (−47.0)	−38.9 (−38.0)	−23.0 (−9.4)	−15.0 (5.0)	−3.9 (25.0)	−1.0 (30.2)	−7.0 (19.4)	−11.4 (11.5)	−25.0 (−13.0)	−36.2 (−33.2)	−40.9 (−41.6)	−47.0 (−52.6)
Average precipitation mm (inches)	3.9 (0.15)	3.2 (0.13)	4.3 (0.17)	8.7 (0.34)	18.5 (0.73)	47.8 (1.88)	62.3 (2.45)	59.6 (2.35)	34.6 (1.36)	11.4 (0.45)	5.8 (0.23)	5.0 (0.20)	265.1 (10.44)
Average precipitation days (≥ 1.0 mm)	1.0	0.8	1.0	2.0	3.7	6.6	9.3	9.5	4.8	2.5	1.6	1.7	44.5
Source 1: Pogoda.ru.net
Source 2: NOAA (precipitation 1961-1990), Meteo Climat (record highs and lows)
