= Javkhlant, Selenge =

District in Selenge Province, Mongolia

Coordinates: 49°44′22″N 106°15′37″E

Javkhlant District Жавхлант сум ᠵᠢᠪᠬᠤᠯᠠᠩᠲᠤᠰᠤᠮᠤ
- District
- Interactive map of Javkhlant District
- Country: Mongolia
- Province: Selenge Province

Area
  - Total: 1,189.70 km^{2} (459.35 sq mi)
- Time zone: UTC+8 (UTC + 8)
- Climate: Dwb

Javkhlant (Mongolian: Жавхлант) is a sum (district) of Selenge Province in northern Mongolia. In 2008, its population was 1,827.

== Administrative divisions ==
The district is divided into two bags, which are:

- Bumbat
- Monostoi
