= Selenge Province =

Province (aimag) of Mongolia

Selenge aimag Сэлэнгэ аймаг ᠰᠡᠯᠡᠩᠭᠡᠠᠶᠢᠮᠠᠭ
- Province
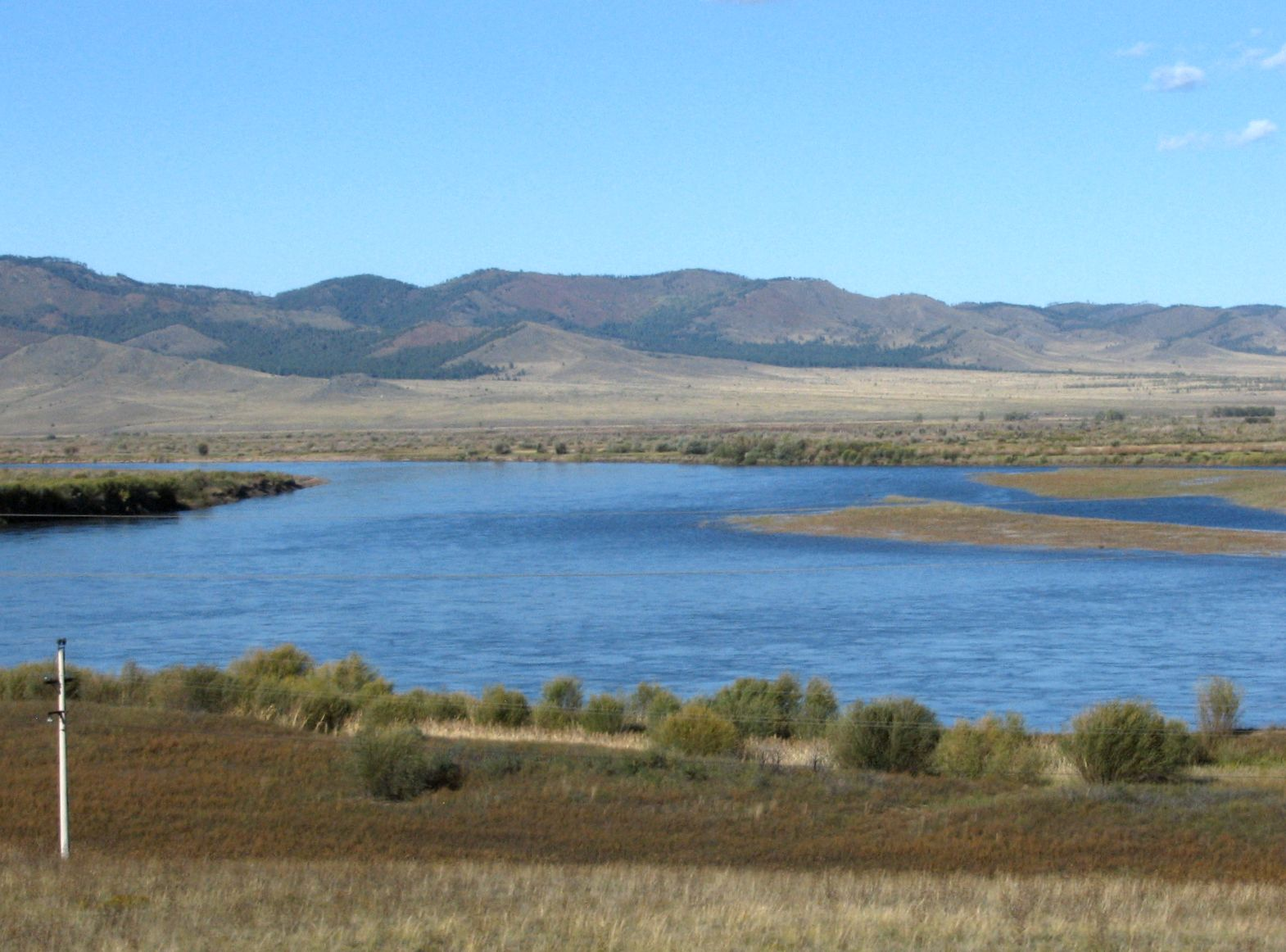
- The Selenge River

- Flag Coat of arms

- Coordinates: 49°45′N 106°30′E
- Country: Mongolia
- Established: 1934
- Capital: Sükhbaatar

Area
  - Total: 41,152.63 km^{2} (15,889.12 sq mi)

Population (2025)
  - Total: 103,831
  - Density: 2.52307/km^{2} (6.53472/sq mi)

GDP
  - Total: MNT 10,024 billion US$ 0.3 billion (2022)
  - Per capita: MNT 21,692,300; US$ 3,026 (2022)
- Time zone: UTC+8
- Area code: +976 (0)136
- ISO 3166 code: MN-049
- Vehicle registration: СЭ_
- Website: selenge.gov.mn

Selenge (Mongolian: Сэлэнгэ) is one of the 21 aimags (provinces) of Mongolia, located in the north of the country, directly bordering Russia. It lies in the broad, fertile river basins of the Selenge and Orkhon rivers, which are among Mongolia's most important waterways. The name is derived from the Selenge river. The capital is Sükhbaatar.

The province of Darkhan-Uul, and its capital Darkhan, is an enclave inside Selenge.

== History ==
In 1994, a portion of its area was taken out to form the Darkhan-Uul Province.

== Geology ==
The province covers roughly ~41,000 km², with a landscape dominated by forest-steppe plains, rolling hills, and river basins. Elevations typically range between ~800 – 1,200 m above sea level in the major valleys.

The province has a total forest area of 19,000 km^{2}.

== Administrative subdivisions ==
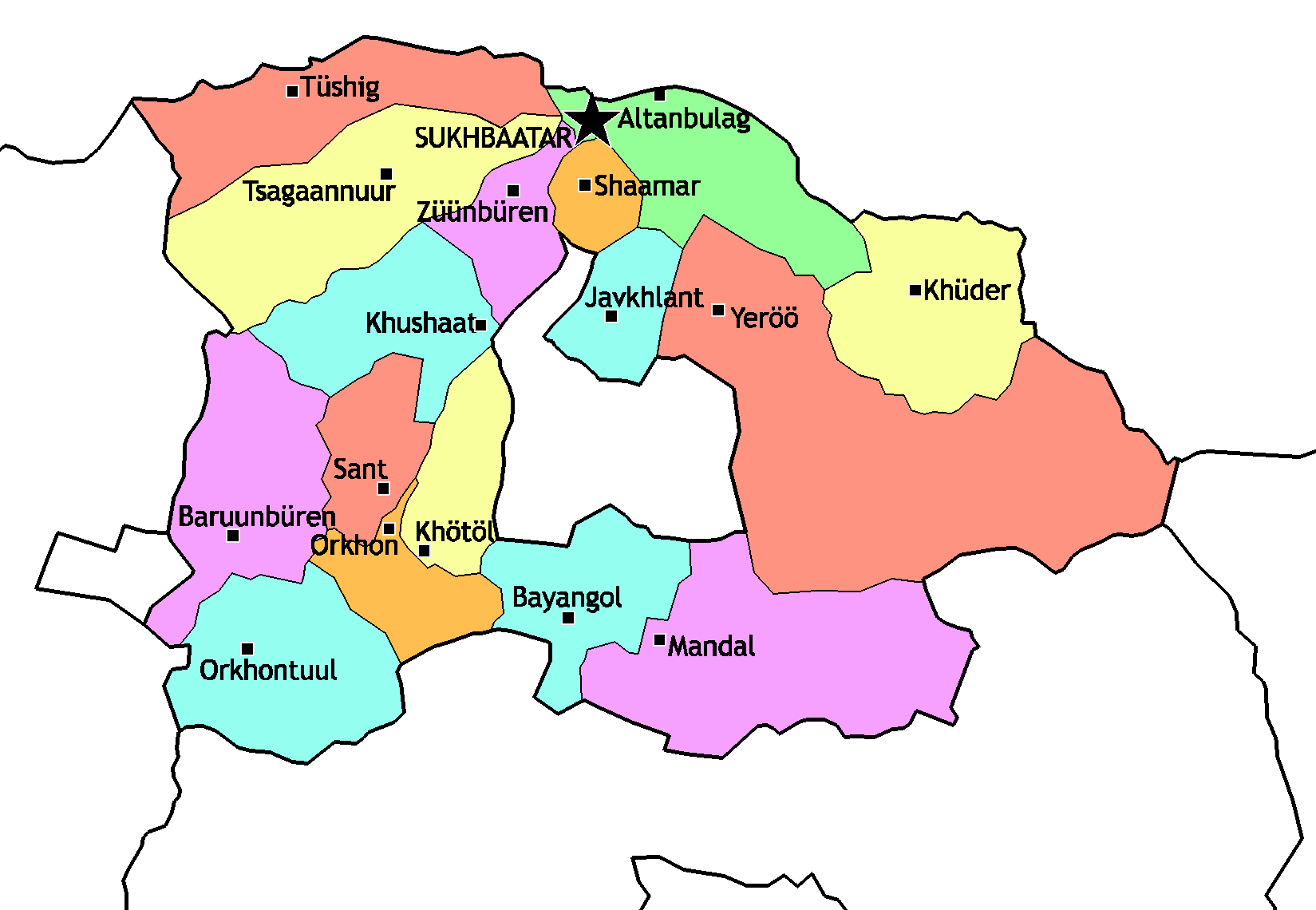
Sums of Selenge

The Sums of Selenge aimag
Sum	Selenge	Population (2000)	Population (2002)	Population (2004)	Population (2006)	Population (2008)	Area (km^{2})	Density (/km^{2})
Altanbulag	Алтанбулаг	3,489	4,003	3,783	4,255	4,545	2100.30	2.16
Baruunbüren	Баруунбүрэн	2,939	2,430	2,430	2,378	2,702	2814.54	0.96
Bayangol	Баянгол	5,391	5,015	4,264	4,512	5,028	1976.28	2.54
Javkhlant	Жавхлант	1,767	1,921	1,838	1,704	1,827	1189.70	1.54
Khüder	Хүдэр	1,799	1,772	1,838	1,936	2,078	2838.65	0.73
Khushaat	Хушаат	1,406	1,679	1,946	1,654	1,585	2010.15	0.79
Mandal	Мандал	23,964	22,645	22,864	22,975	23,646	4843.73	4.88
Orkhon	Орхон	2,817	2,467	2,106	2,006	2,165	1306.27	1.66
Orkhontuul	Орхонтуул	3,760	4,016	3,398	3,248	2,952	2940.83	1.00
Sant	Сант	2,062	2,050	2,033	2,054	2,056	1387.06	1.48
Saikhan	Сайхан	8,737	8,795	8,282	8,100	8,285	1311.87	6.32
Shaamar	Шаамар	4,809	4,157	3,783	3,944	4,158	671.91	6.19
Sükhbaatar^{*}	Сүхбаатар	22,374	21,076	20,025	19,916	19,626	45.35	432.77
Tsagaannuur	Цагааннуур	4,153	4,221	3,919	4,005	4,257	3814.72	1.12
Tüshig	Түшиг	1,899	1,725	1,608	1,552	1,420	2492.82	0.57
Yeröö	Ерөө	6,077	5,677	5,531	5,630	5,792	8203.51	0.71
Züünbüren	Зүүнбүрэн	2,507	2,226	2,373	2,201	2,468	1204.94	2.05
Züünkharaa	Зүүнхараа	-	-	-	-	-	-	-

^{*} The aimag capital Sükhbaatar.

== Economy ==
In 2018, the province contributed to 2.12% of the total national GDP of Mongolia.

== Government ==
=== Governors ===
- Jargaltulgyn Erdenebat (2008–2012)
