= Sant, Övörkhangai =

District in Övörkhangai Province, Mongolia

Coordinates: 46°05′27″N 103°50′23″E

Sant District Сант сум ᠰᠠᠩᠲᠤᠰᠤᠮᠤ
- District
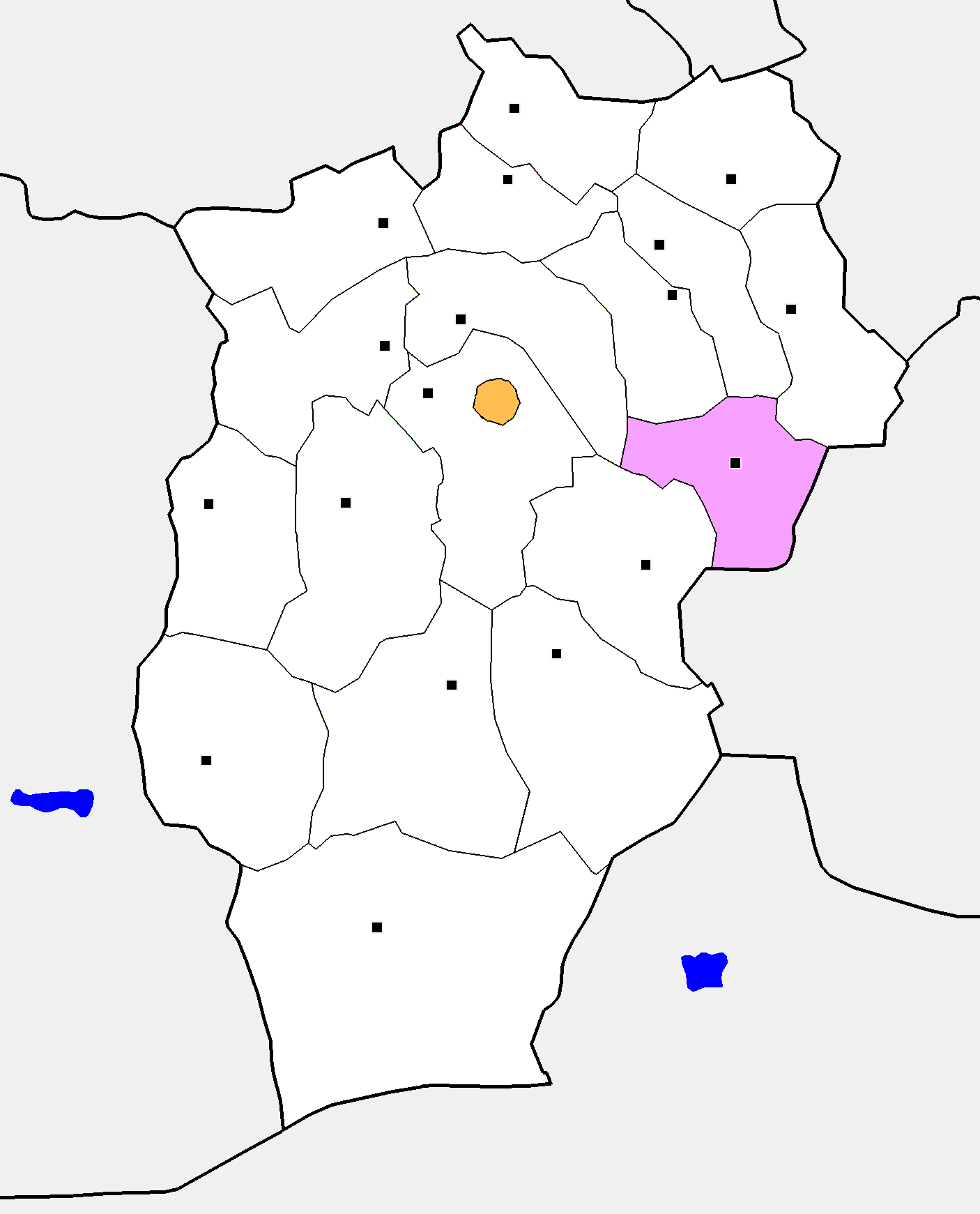
- Sant District in Övörkhangai Province
- Country: Mongolia
- Province: Övörkhangai Province
- Time zone: UTC+8 (UTC + 8)

Sant (Mongolian: Сант "protected") is a sum (district) of Övörkhangai Province in southern Mongolia. In 2008, its population was 3,525.

== Administrative divisions ==
The district is divided into five bags, which are:

- Maikhan
- Tsakhiurt
- Tsargi
- Ulaan-Ovoo
- Zalaa
