= Tögrög, Övörkhangai =

District in Övörkhangai Province, Mongolia

Coordinates: 45°32′23″N 102°59′46″E

Tögrög District Төгрөг сум ᠲᠥᠭᠦᠷᠢᠭᠰᠤᠮᠤ
- District
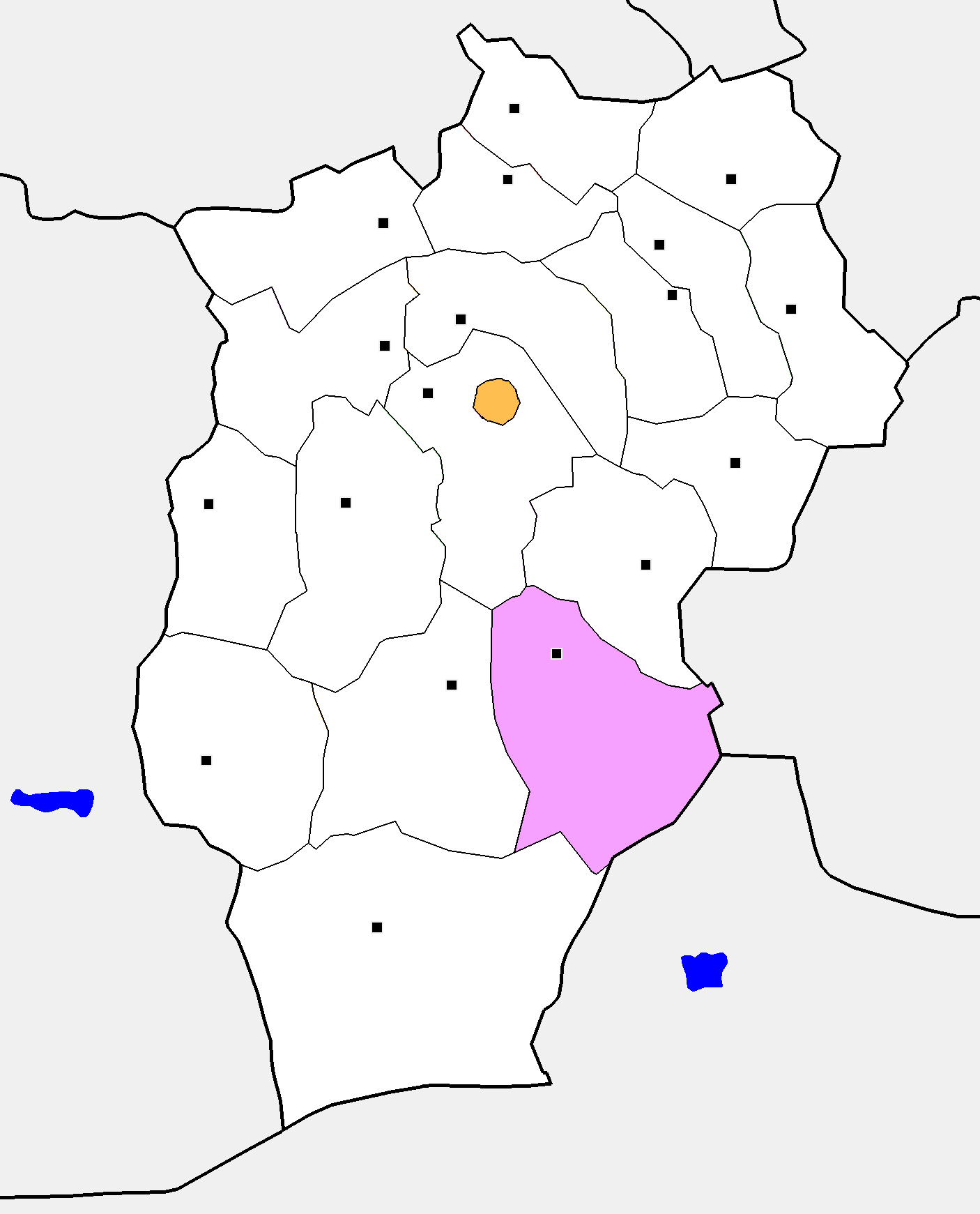
- Tögrög District in Övörkhangai Province
- Country: Mongolia
- Province: Övörkhangai Province
- Time zone: UTC+8 (UTC + 8)

Tögrög (Mongolian: Төгрөг) is a sum (district) of Övörkhangai Province in south-central Mongolia. In 2008, its population was 2,689.

== Administrative divisions ==
The district is divided into five bags, which are:

- Bayan
- Ikh-Us
- Khoolt
- Mazar
- Sain tugrug
