= Bayan-Öndör, Övörkhangai =

District in Övörkhangai, Mongolia

Coordinates: 46°29′47″N 104°07′11″E

Bayan-Öndör District Баян-Өндөр сум ᠪᠠᠶ᠋ᠠᠨᠥᠨᠳᠦᠷᠰᠤᠮᠤ
- District
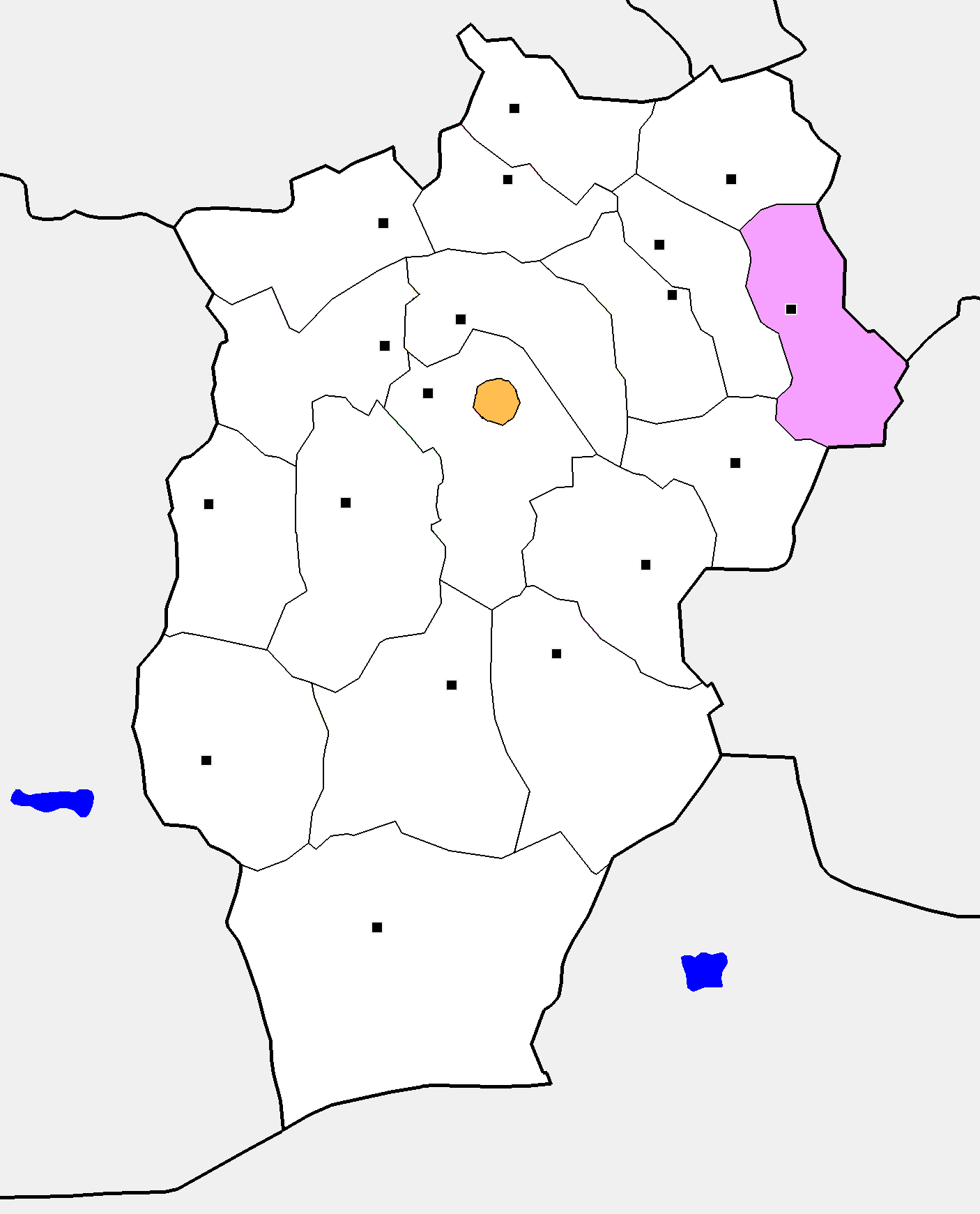
- Bayan-Öndör District in Övörkhangai Province
- Country: Mongolia
- Province: Övörkhangai Province
- Time zone: UTC+8 (UTC + 8)

Bayan-Öndör (Mongolian: Баян-Өндөр, Rich tall) is a sum (district) of Övörkhangai Province in southern Mongolia.

== Administrative divisions ==
The district is divided into five bags, which are:

- Batkhaan
- Bumbat
- Bumbii
- Khar toirom
- Uvur zulegt
