= Khairkhandulaan, Övörkhangai =

District in Övörkhangai Province, Mongolia

Coordinates: 45°57′42″N 102°03′42″E

Khairkhandulaan District Хайрхандулаан сум ᠬᠠᠶᠢᠷᠬᠠᠨᠳᠤᠯᠠᠭᠠᠨᠰᠤᠮᠤ
- District
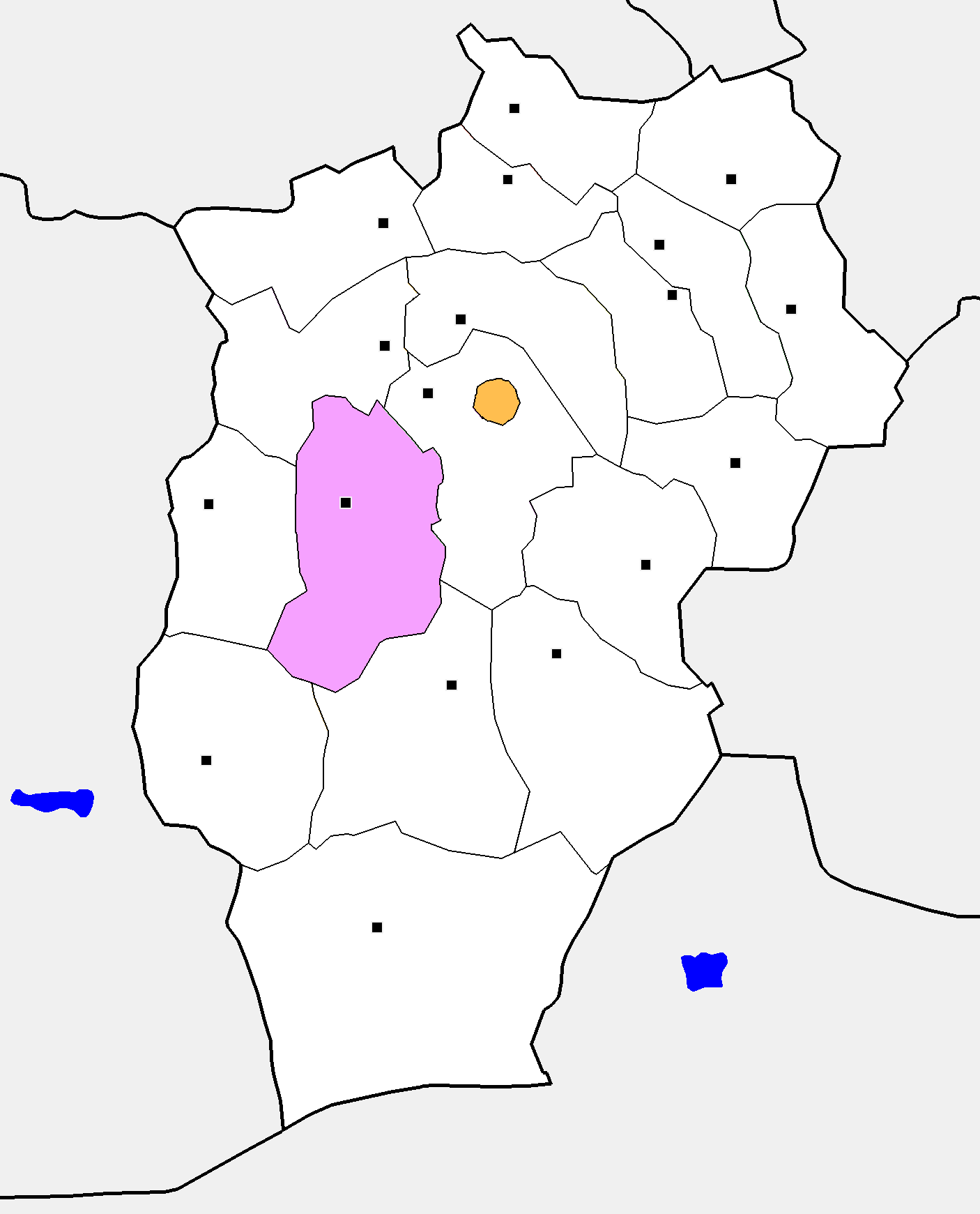
- Khairkhandulaan District in Övörkhangai Province
- Country: Mongolia
- Province: Övörkhangai Province
- Time zone: UTC+8 (UTC + 8)

Khairkhandulaan (Mongolian: Хайрхандулаан, Mountain warm) is a sum (district) of Övörkhangai Province in southern Mongolia. In 2008, its population was 3,510.

== Administrative divisions ==
The district is divided into six bags, which are:

- Ar Aguit
- Burkhant
- Dersen Khonkhor
- Emeelt
- Marzat
- Nart
