= Övörkhangai Province =

Province (aimag) of Mongolia

Övörkhangai Province Өвөрхангай аймаг ᠥᠪᠦᠷᠬᠠᠩᠭ᠋ᠠᠢᠠᠶᠢᠮᠠᠭ
- Province
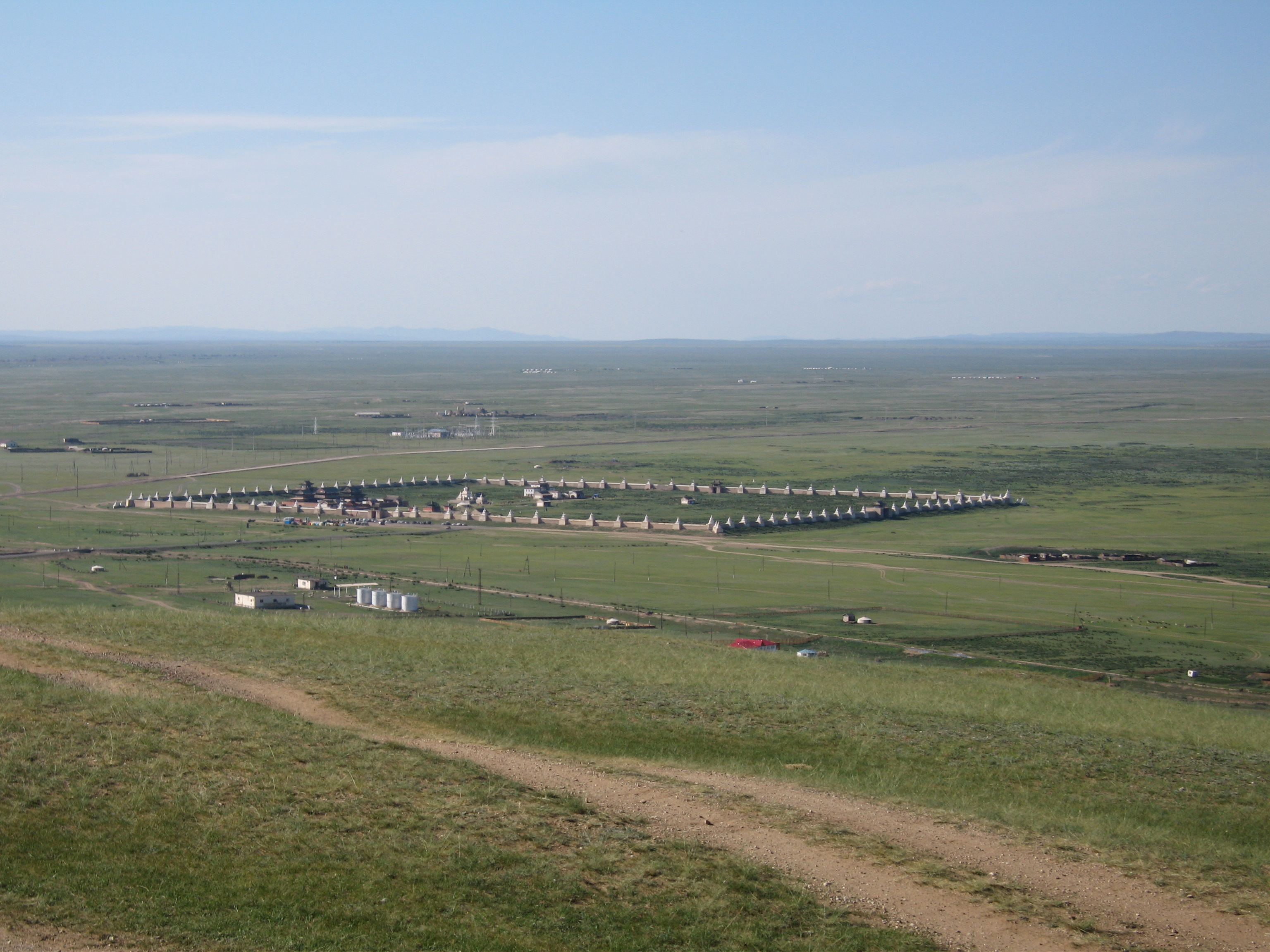
- Scenery around Erdene Zuu monastery

- Flag Seal

- Coordinates: 45°45′N 102°45′E
- Country: Mongolia
- Established: 1931
- Capital: Arvaikheer

Area
  - Total: 62,895.33 km^{2} (24,284.02 sq mi)

Population (2025)
  - Total: 113,486
  - Density: 1.80436/km^{2} (4.67328/sq mi)

GDP
  - Total: MNT 804 billion US$ 0.3 billion (2022)
  - Per capita: MNT 6,857,800; US$ 2,196 (2022)
- Time zone: UTC+8
- Area code: +976 (0)132
- ISO 3166 code: MN-055
- Vehicle registration: ӨВ_
- Website: gate1.pmis.gov.mn/uvurkhangai

Övörkhangai (Mongolian: Өвөрхангай; lit. "South Khangai") is one of the 21 aimags (provinces) of Mongolia. Its capital is Arvaikheer.

The Shankh Monastery, one of the oldest and most important monasteries, is located in this province, as well as Erdene Zuu monastery and Tövkhön Monastery. Karakorum, the ancient capital of the Mongol Empire, was located adjacent to the Erdene Zuu monastery.

== Geography ==
The province is located in central Mongolia. The Khangai Mountains cover its northern and northwestern parts. A steppe plain stretches to the south, and the extreme south enters the foothills of the Mongolian part of the Altai Mountains.

== Administrative subdivisions ==
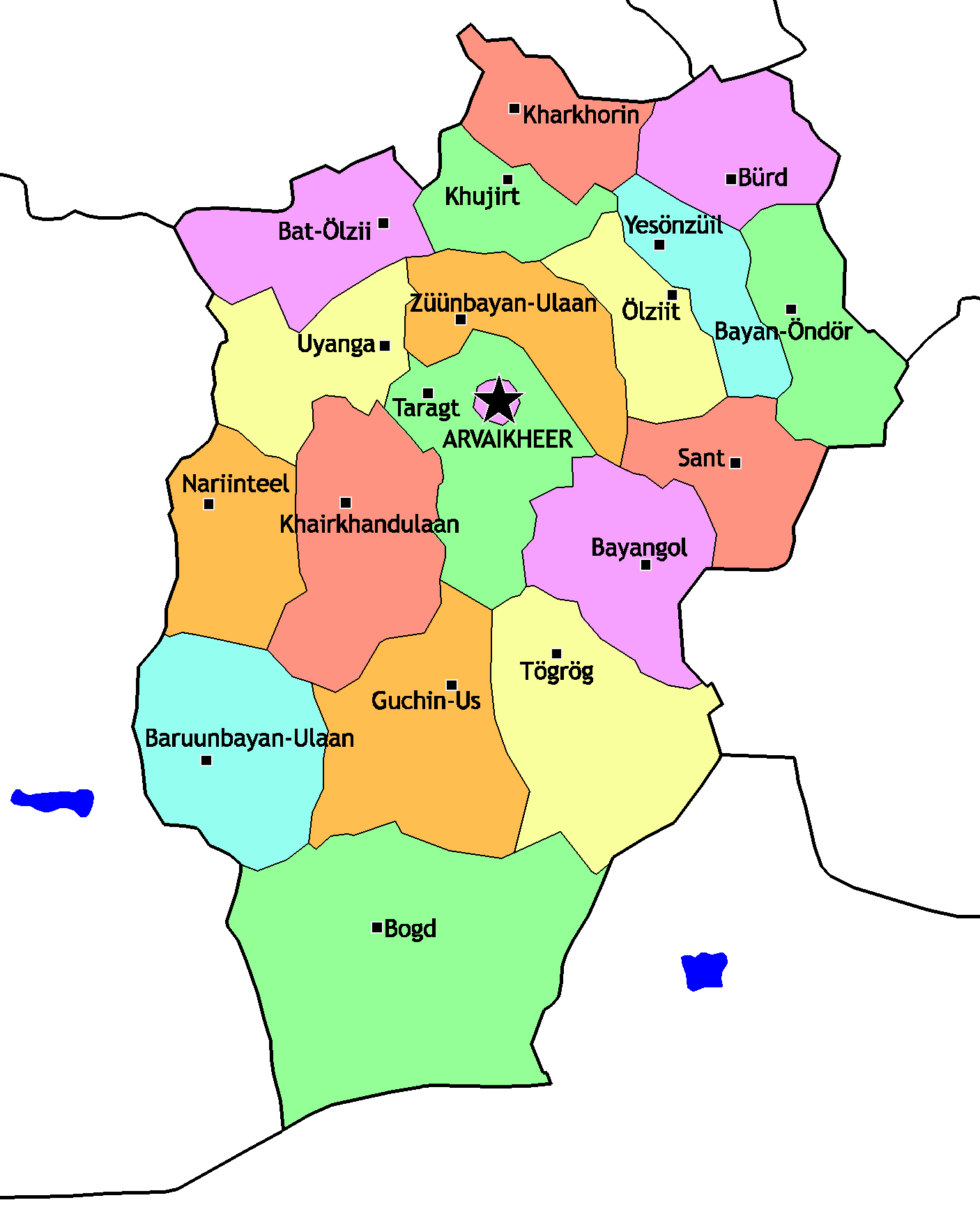
Sums of Övörkhangai

As of 2009, the aimag is subdivided into 19 sums.

The sums of Övörkhangai Aimag
| Sum | Mongolian | Population 2004 est. | Population 2006 est. | Population 2008 est. |
|---|---|---|---|---|
| Arvaikheer | Арвайхээр | 22,546 | 24,954 | 25,622 |
| Baruun Bayan-Ulaan | Баруун Баян-Улаан | 2,586 | 2,502 | 2,556 |
| Bat-Ölzii | Бат-Өлзий | 5,932 | 5,878 | 6,189 |
| Bayan-Öndör | Баян-Өндөр | 3,734 | 4,077 | 4,261 |
| Bayangol | Баянгол | 4,103 | 3,933 | 4,572 |
| Bogd | Богд | 5,708 | 5,395 | 5,342 |
| Bürd | Бүрд | 3,171 | 3,258 | 3,135 |
| Guchin-Us | Гучин-Ус | 2,290 | 2,279 | 2,260 |
| Khairkhandulaan | Хайрхандулаан | 3,388 | 3,462 | 3,510 |
| Kharkhorin | Хархорин | 12,546 | 13,270 | 12,901 |
| Khujirt | Хужирт | 6,781 | 6,749 | 6,649 |
| Nariinteel | Нарийнтээл | 3,797 | 3,792 | 3,736 |
| Ölziit | Өлзийт | 2,805 | 2,678 | 2,741 |
| Sant | Сант | 3,706 | 3,540 | 3,525 |
| Taragt | Тарагт | 3,860 | 3,424 | 3,313 |
| Tögrög | Төгрөг | 2,839 | 2,691 | 2,689 |
| Uyanga | Уянга | 10,003 | 10,510 | 9,581 |
| Yesönzüil | Есөнзүйл | 3,584 | 3,415 | 3,422 |
| Züünbayan-Ulaan | Зүүнбаян-Улаан | 4,268 | 4,343 | 4,436 |

== Economy ==
In 2018, the province contributed to 1.52% of the total national GDP of Mongolia.

== Culture ==
Övörkhangai Province held Mongolia area's first Special Olympics Games events in 2015.

== Transportation ==
The Arvaikheer Airport (AVK/ZMAH) has one unpaved runway and is served by regular flights to Ulaanbaatar and Altai.

Bus travels from Arvaikheer to Ulaanbaatar.
