= Districts of Mongolia =

Administrative subdivision of Mongolia

A district or sum (/sʊm/; Mongolian: сум ᠰᠤᠮᠤ) is a second-level administrative subdivision of Mongolia. The 21 provinces of Mongolia are divided into 330 sums.

On average, each district administers a territory of 4,200 km^{2} (1,600 sq mi) with about 5,000 inhabitants, primarily nomadic herders. Its total revenue is 120 million Tögrög, 90% of which comes from national subsidies.

Each district is again subdivided into bags (brigades; sometimes spelled baghs). Most bags are of an entirely virtual nature. Their purpose is to sort the families of nomads in the district into groups, without a permanent human settlement.

Officially, and occasionally on maps, many district seats (sum centers) bear a name different from that of the district. However, in practice the district seat (sum center) is most often referred to under the name of the district, to the point of the official name of the district seat (sum center) being unknown even to the locals.

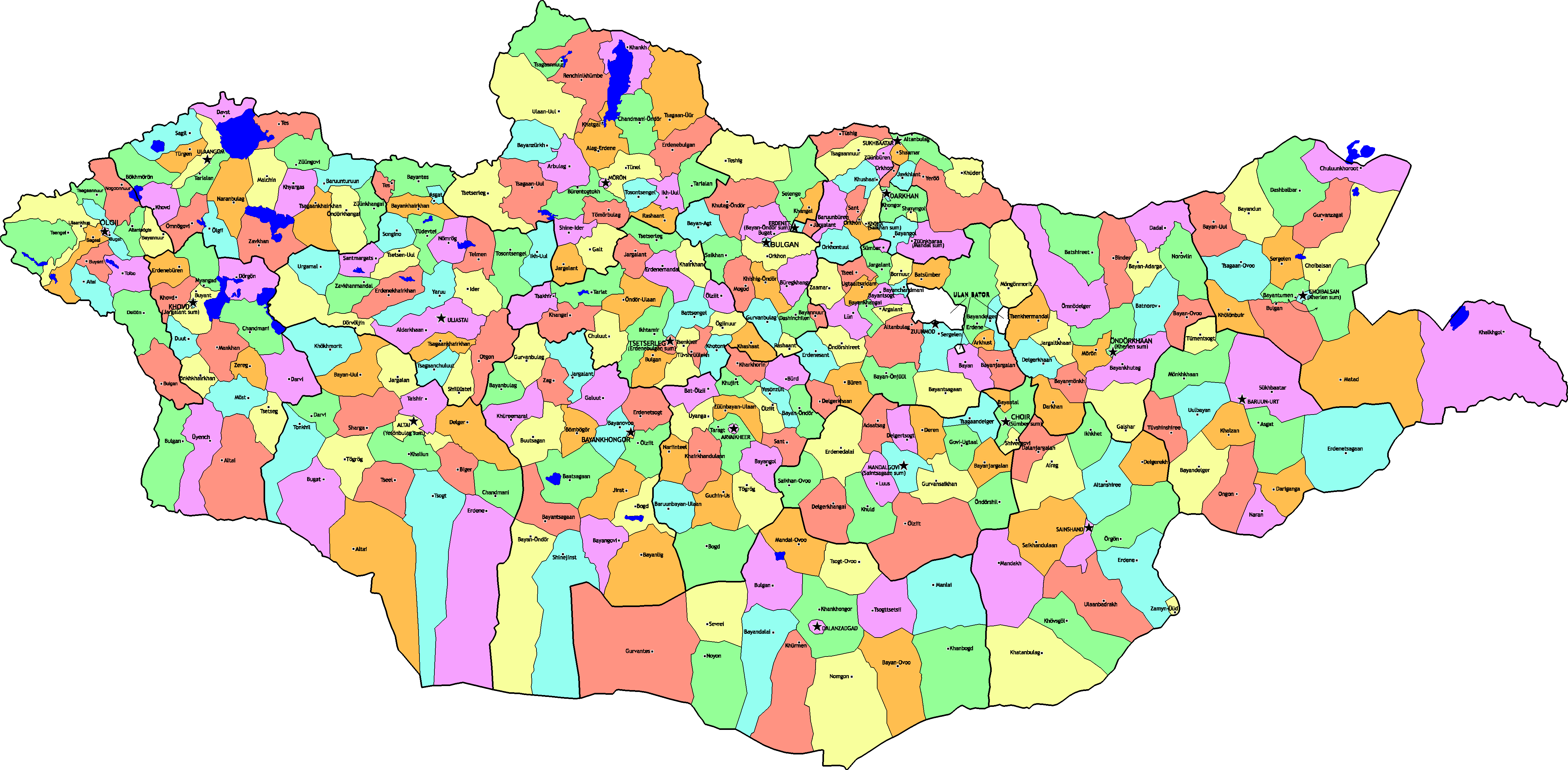
Districts map of Mongolia

== Arkhangai Province ==
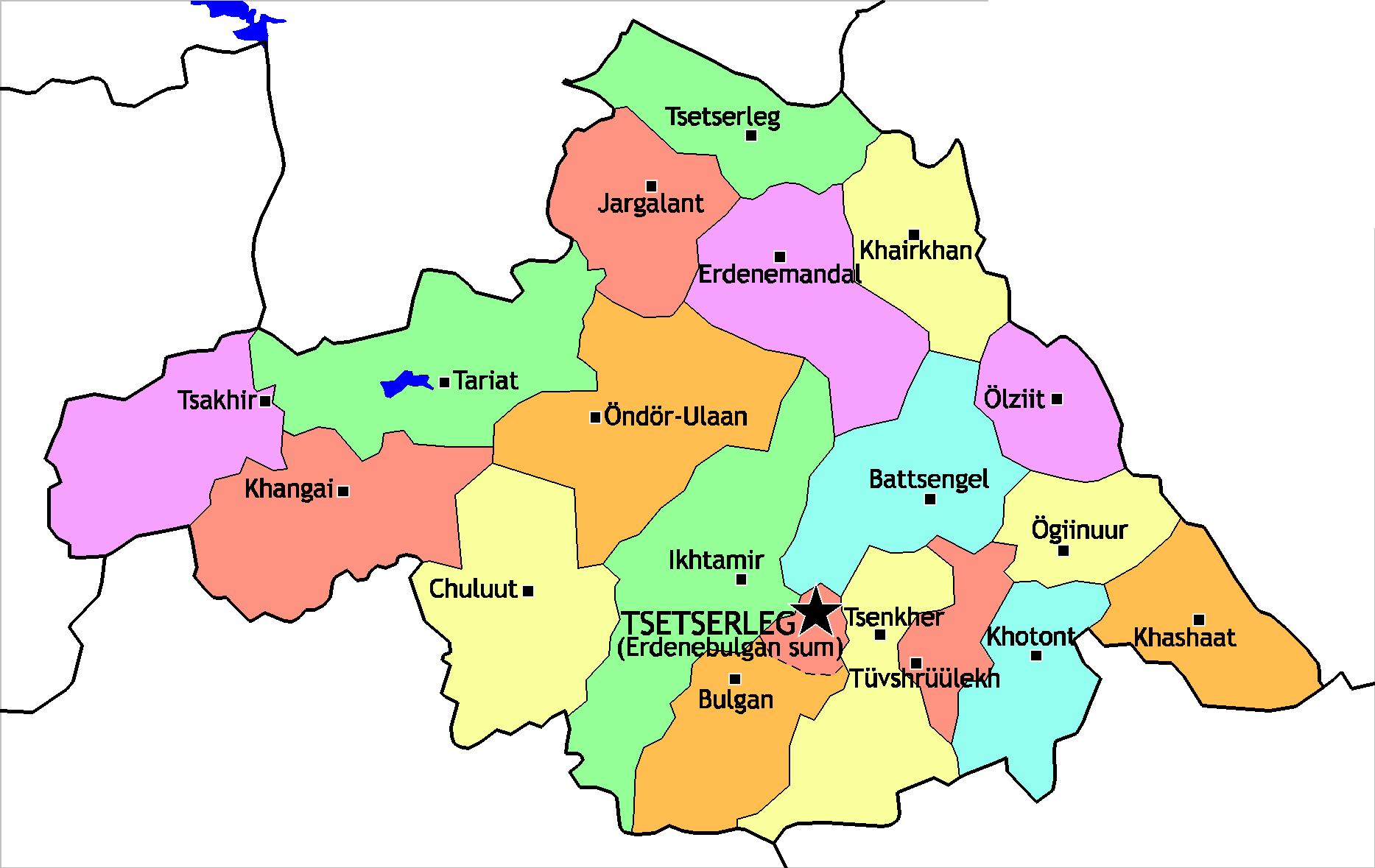
Districts of Arkhangai Province

19 sum

- Battsengel
- Bulgan
- Chuluut
- Erdenebulgan
- Erdenemandal
- Ikh-Tamir
- Jargalant
- Khangai
- Khashaat
- Khairkhan
- Khotont
- Ögii nuur
- Ölziit
- Öndör-Ulaan
- Tariat
- Tsakhir
- Tsenkher
- Tsetserleg
- Tüvshrüülekh

== Bayan-Ölgii Province ==
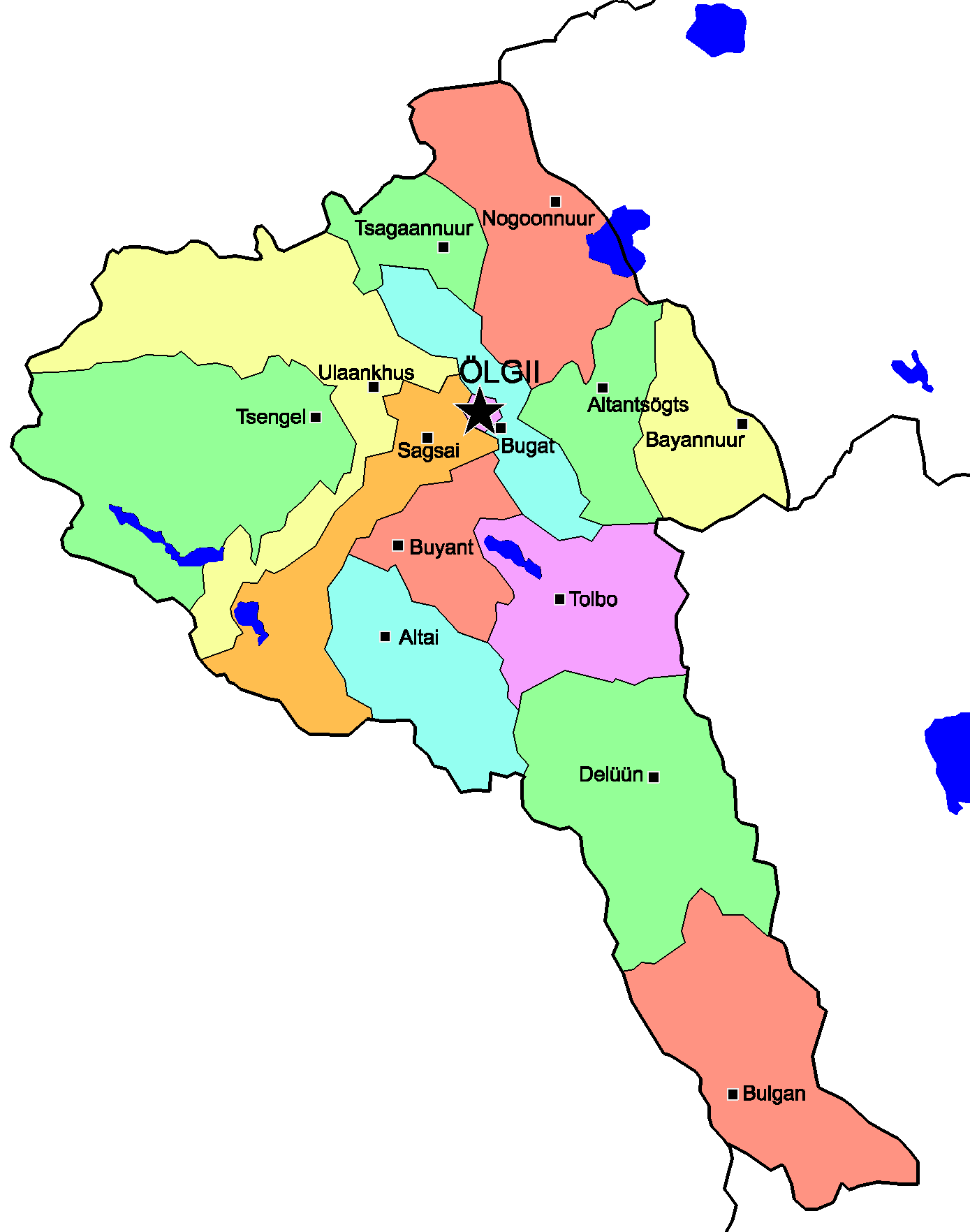
Districts of Bayan-Ölgii Province

13 district, 1 village

- Altantsögts
- Altai
- Bayannuur
- Bugat
- Bulgan
- Buyant
- Delüün
- Nogoonnuur
- Ölgii
- Sagsai
- Tolbo
- Tsagaannuur (village)
- Tsengel
- Ulaankhus

== Bayankhongor Province ==
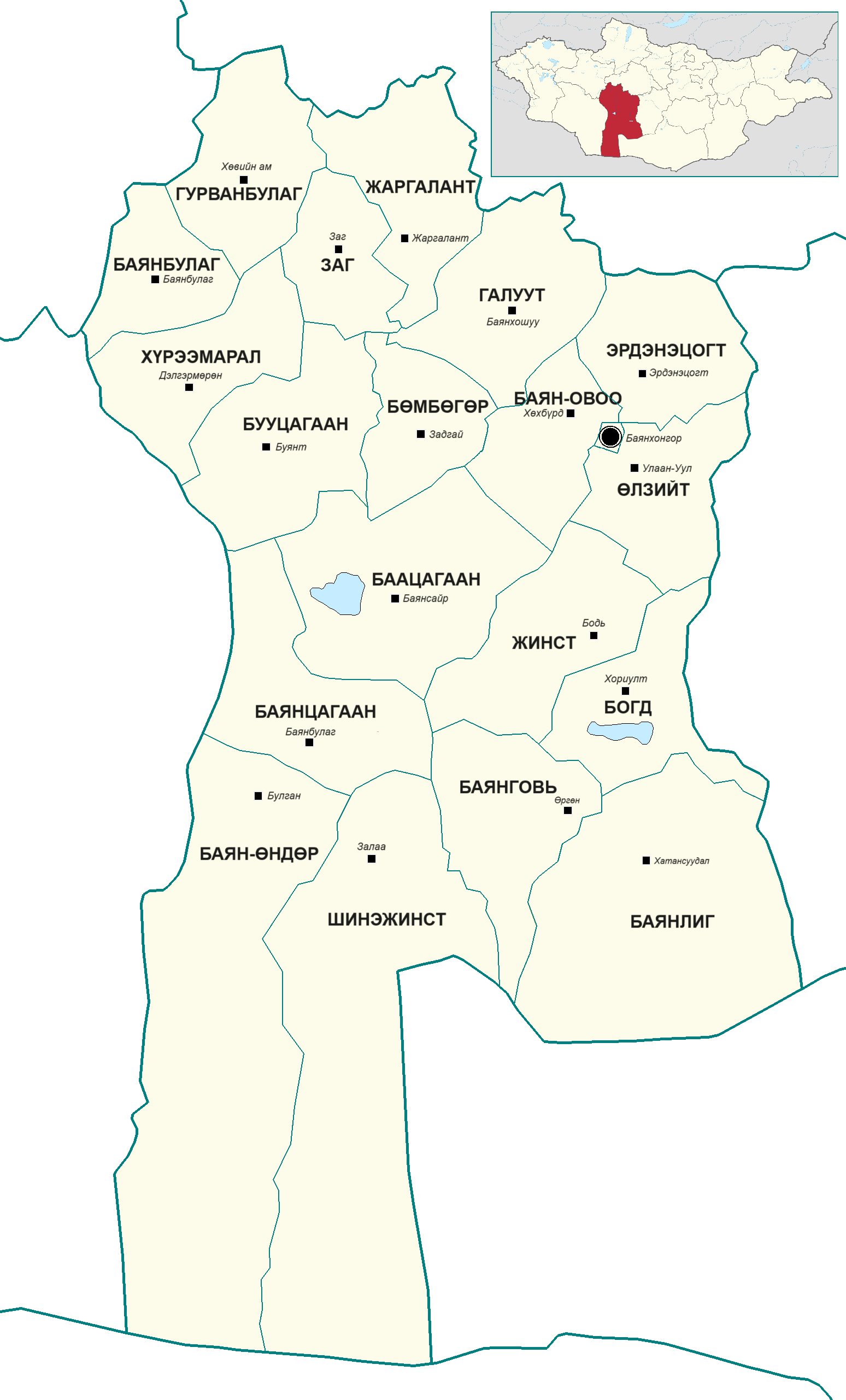
Districts of Bayankhongor Province

20 sum

- Baatsagaan
- Bayan-Öndör
- Bayan-Ovoo
- Bayanbulag
- Bayangovi
- Bayankhongor
- Bayanlig
- Bayantsagaan
- Bogd
- Bömbögör
- Buutsagaan
- Erdenetsogt
- Galuut
- Gurvanbulag
- Jargalant
- Jinst
- Khüreemaral
- Ölziit
- Shinejinst
- Zag

== Bulgan Province ==
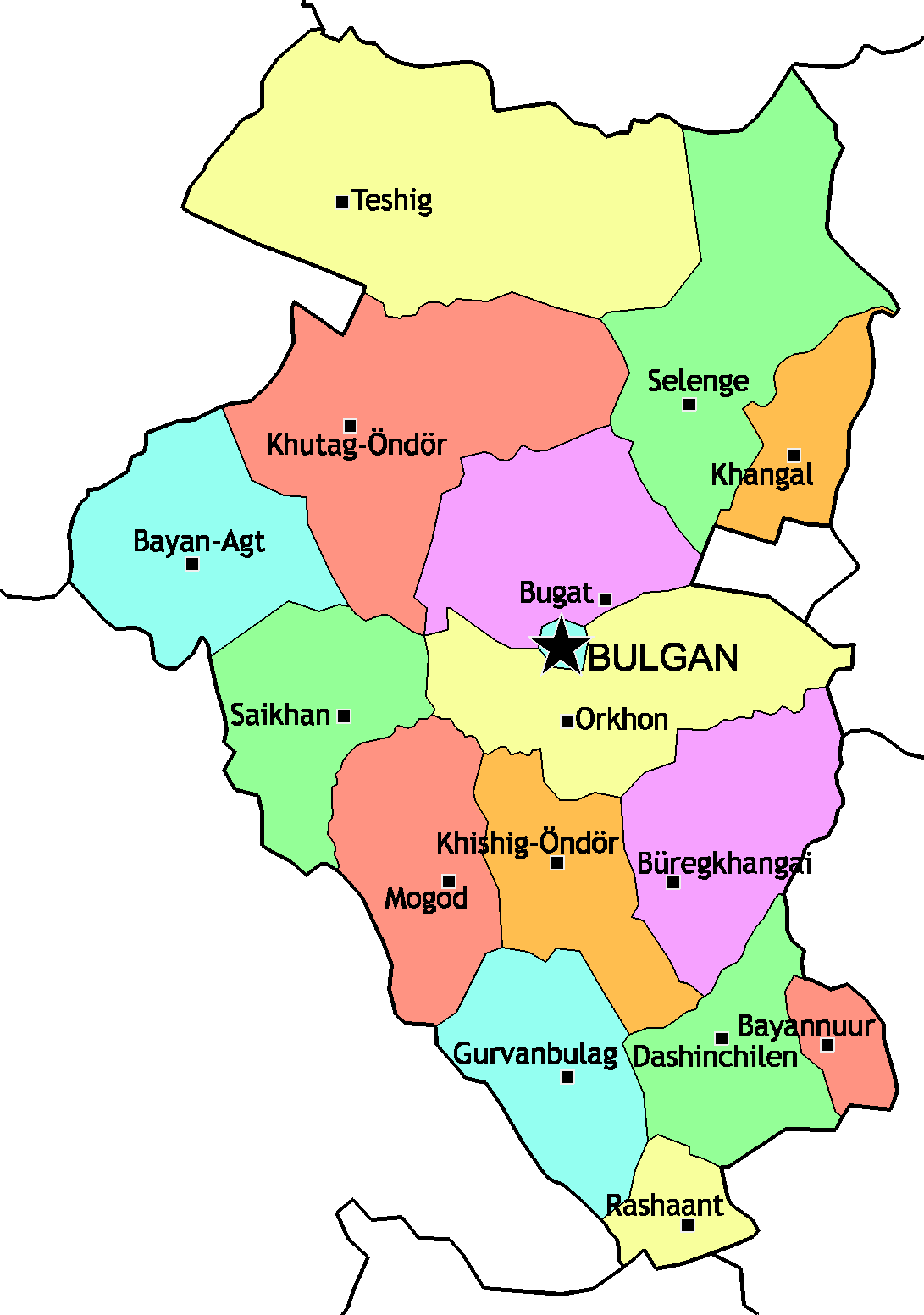
Districts of Bulgan Province

16 sum

- Bayan-Agt
- Bayanuur
- Bugat
- Bulgan
- Büregkhangai
- Dashinchilen
- Gurvanbulag
- Khangal
- Khishig-Öndör
- Khutag-Öndör
- Mogod
- Orkhon
- Rashaant
- Saikhan
- Selenge
- Teshig

== Darkhan-Uul Province ==
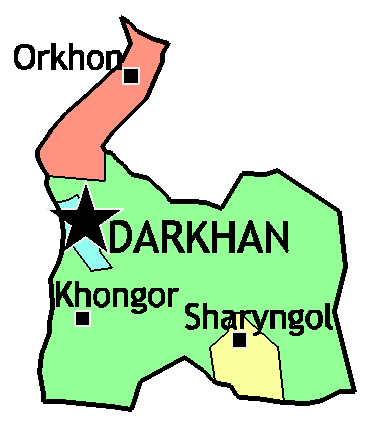
Districts of Darkhan-Uul Province

4 sum

- Darkhan
- Khongor
- Orkhon
- Sharyngol

== Dornod Province ==
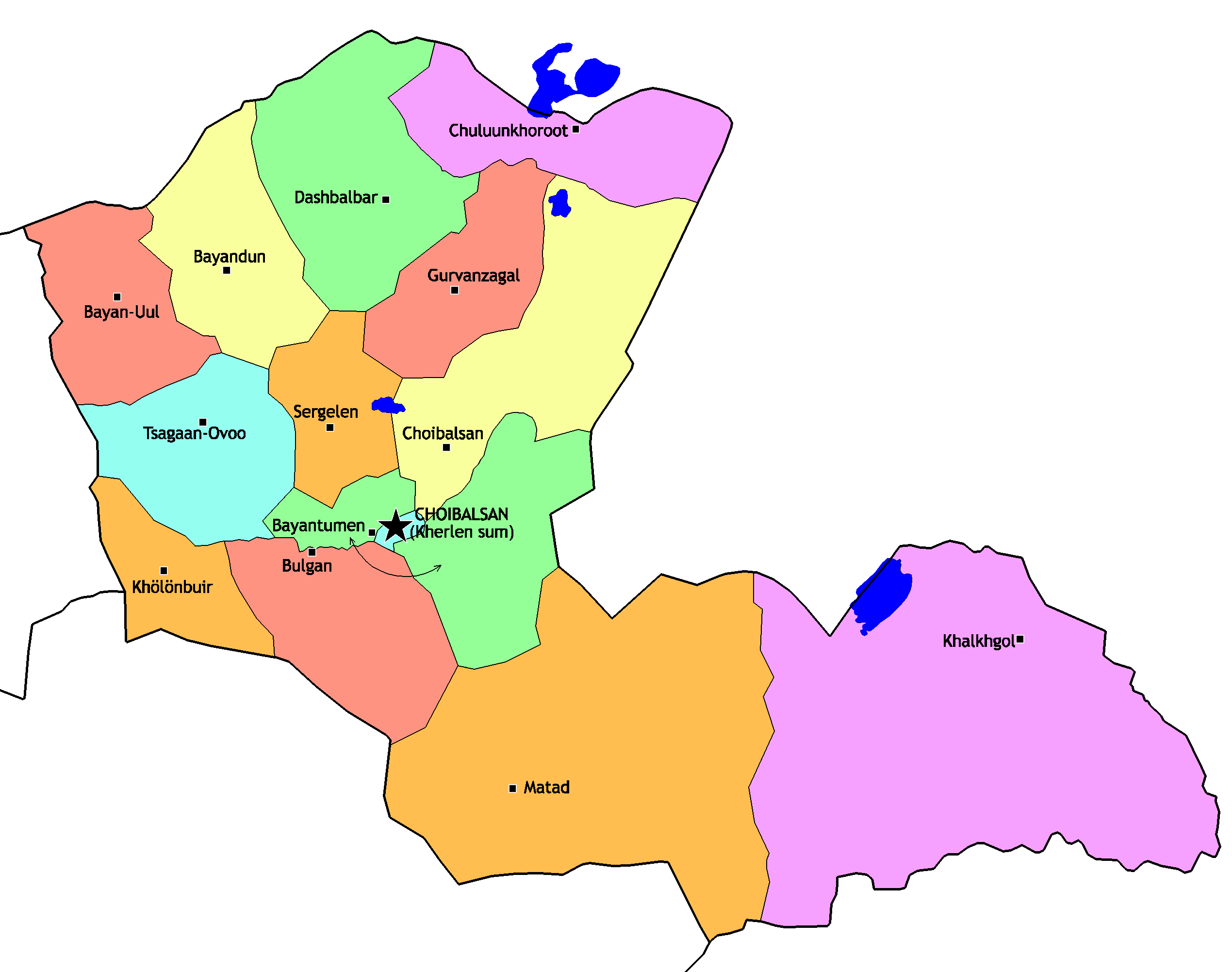
Districts of Dornod Province

14 sum

- Bayan-Uul
- Bayandun
- Bayantümen
- Bulgan
- Choibalsan
- Chuluunkhoroot
- Dashbalbar
- Gurvanzagal
- Khalkhgol
- Kherlen
- Khölönbuir
- Matad
- Sergelen
- Tsagaan-Ovoo

== Dornogovi Province ==
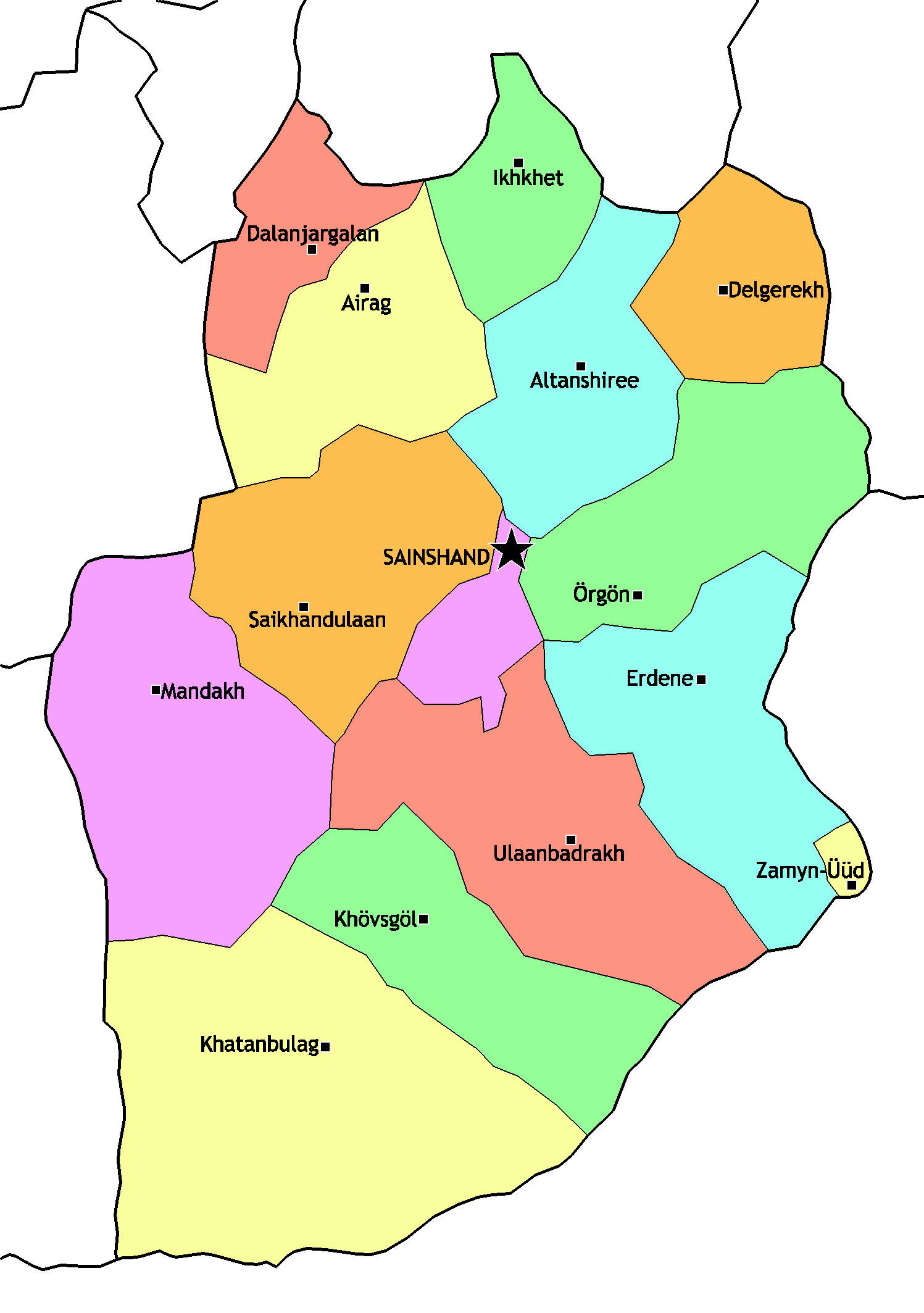
Districts of Dornogovi Province

14 sum

- Altanshiree
- Airag
- Dalanjargalan
- Delgerekh
- Erdene
- Khatanbulag
- Khövsgöl
- Ikhkhet
- Mandakh
- Örgön
- Saikhandulaan
- Sainshand
- Ulaanbadrakh
- Zamyn-Üüd

== Dundgovi Province ==
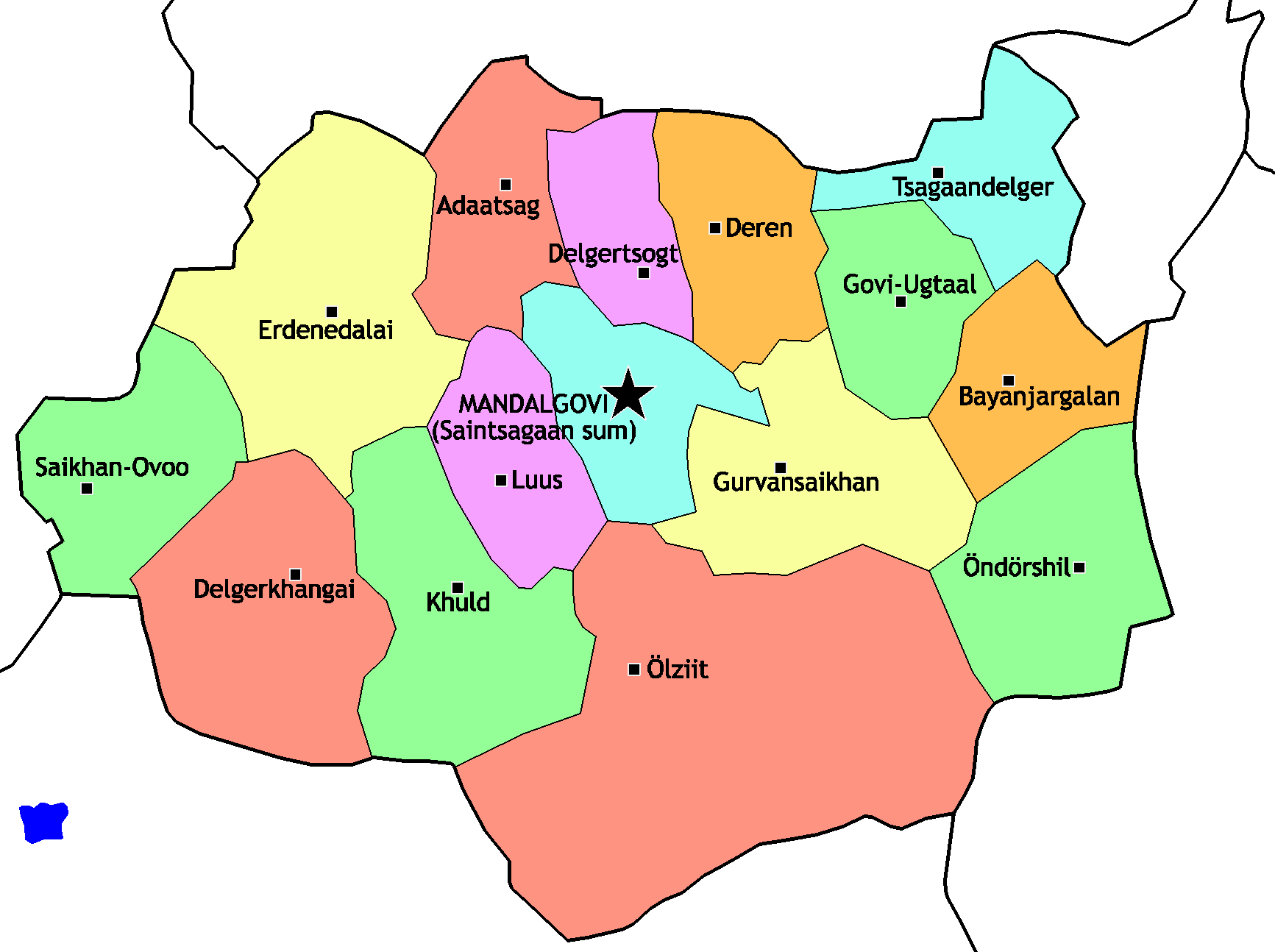
Districts of Dundgovi Province

15 sum

- Adaatsag
- Bayanjargalan
- Delgerkhangai
- Delgertsogt
- Deren
- Erdenedalai
- Govi-Ugtaal
- Gurvansaikhan
- Khuld
- Luus
- Ölziit
- Öndörshil
- Saikhan-Ovoo
- Saintsagaan
- Tsagaandelger

== Govi-Altai Province ==
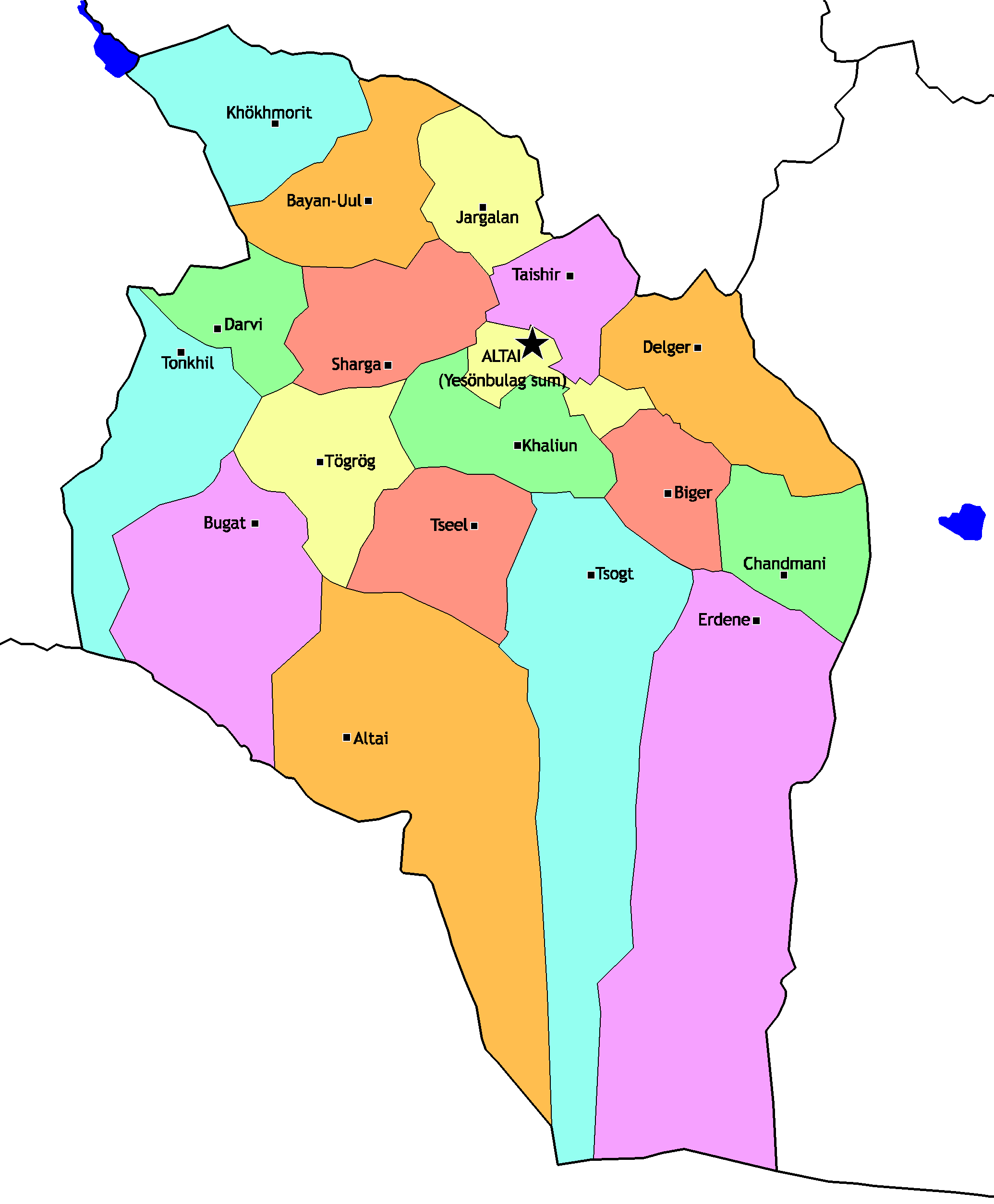
Districts of Govi-Altai Province

18 sum

- Altai
- Bayan-Uul
- Biger
- Bugat
- Chandmani
- Darvi
- Delger
- Erdene
- Khaliun
- Khökh morit
- Jargalan
- Sharga
- Taishir
- Tögrög
- Tonkhil
- Tseel
- Tsogt
- Yesönbulag

== Govisümber Province ==
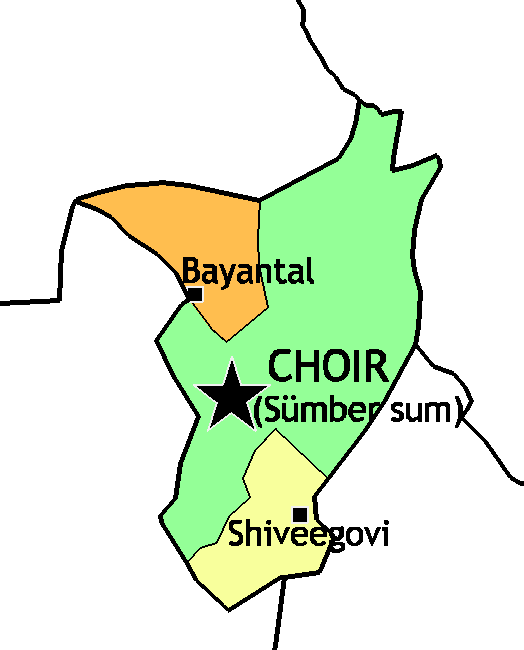
Districts of Govisümber Province

3 sum

- Bayantal
- Shiveegovi
- Sümber (Choir)

== Khentii Province ==
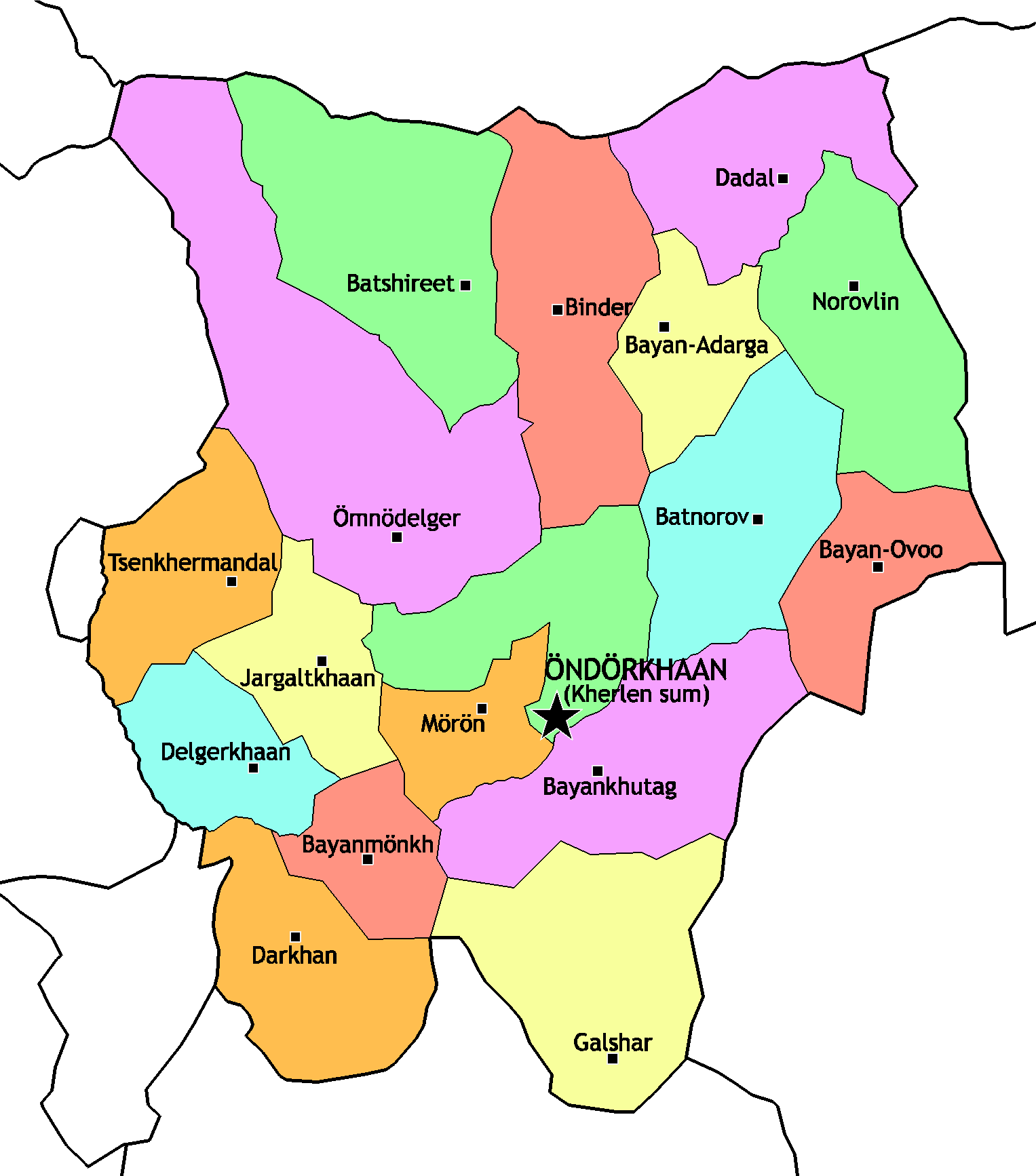
Districts of Khentii Province

17 sum

- Batnorov
- Bayan-Adarga
- Bayankhutag
- Bayanmönkh
- Bayan-Ovoo
- Binder
- Dadal
- Darkhan
- Delgerkhaan
- Eg
- Galshar
- Kherlen
- Jargaltkhaan
- Mörön
- Norovlin
- Ömöndelger
- Tsenkhermandal

== Khovd Province ==
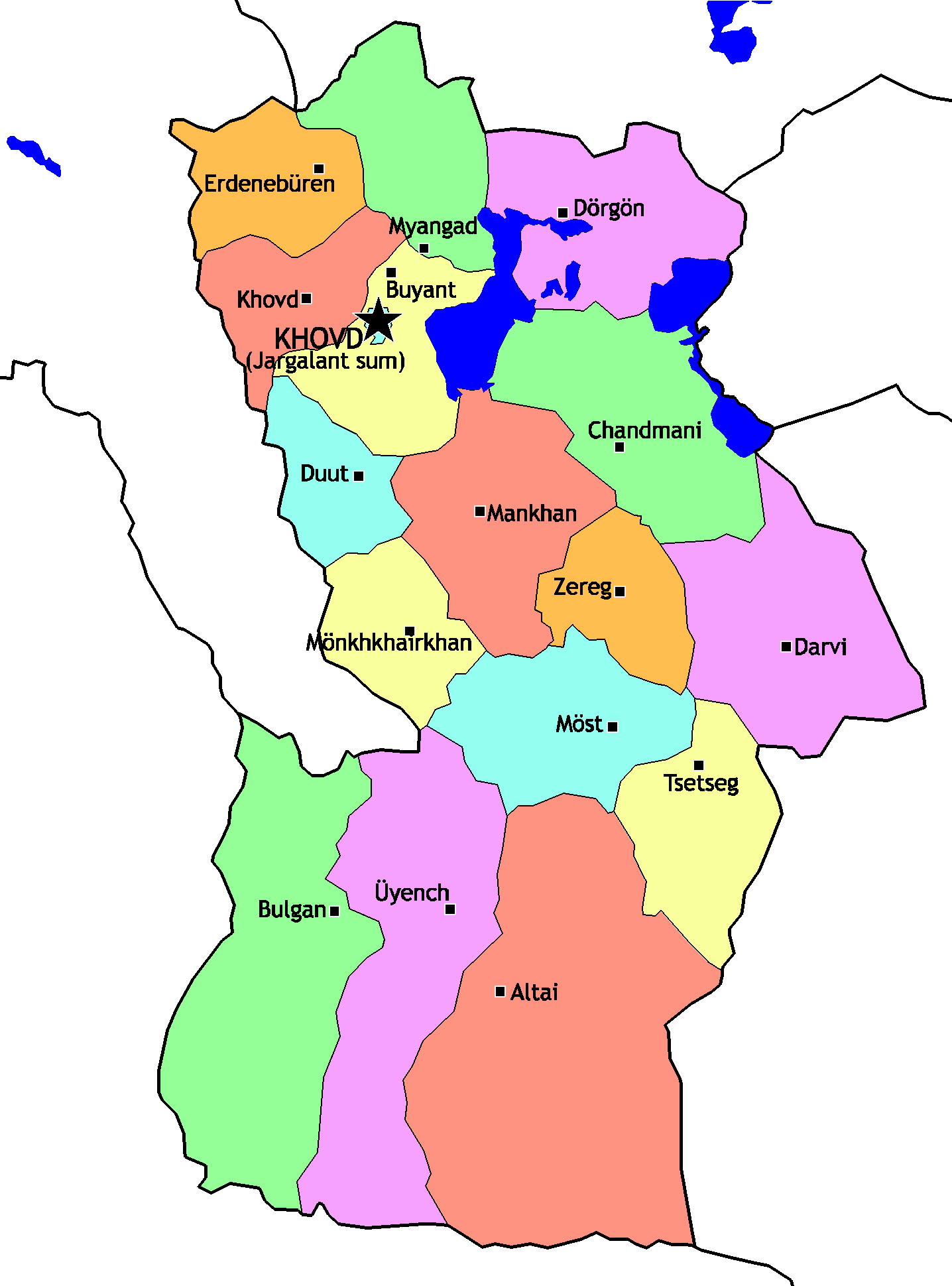
Districts of Khovd Province

17 sum

- Altai
- Bulgan
- Buyant
- Chandmani
- Darvi
- Dörgön
- Duut
- Erdenebüren
- Jargalant (Khovd city)
- Khovd (sum)
- Mankhan
- Mönkhkhairkhan
- Möst
- Myangad
- Tsetseg
- Üyench
- Zereg

== Khövsgöl Province ==
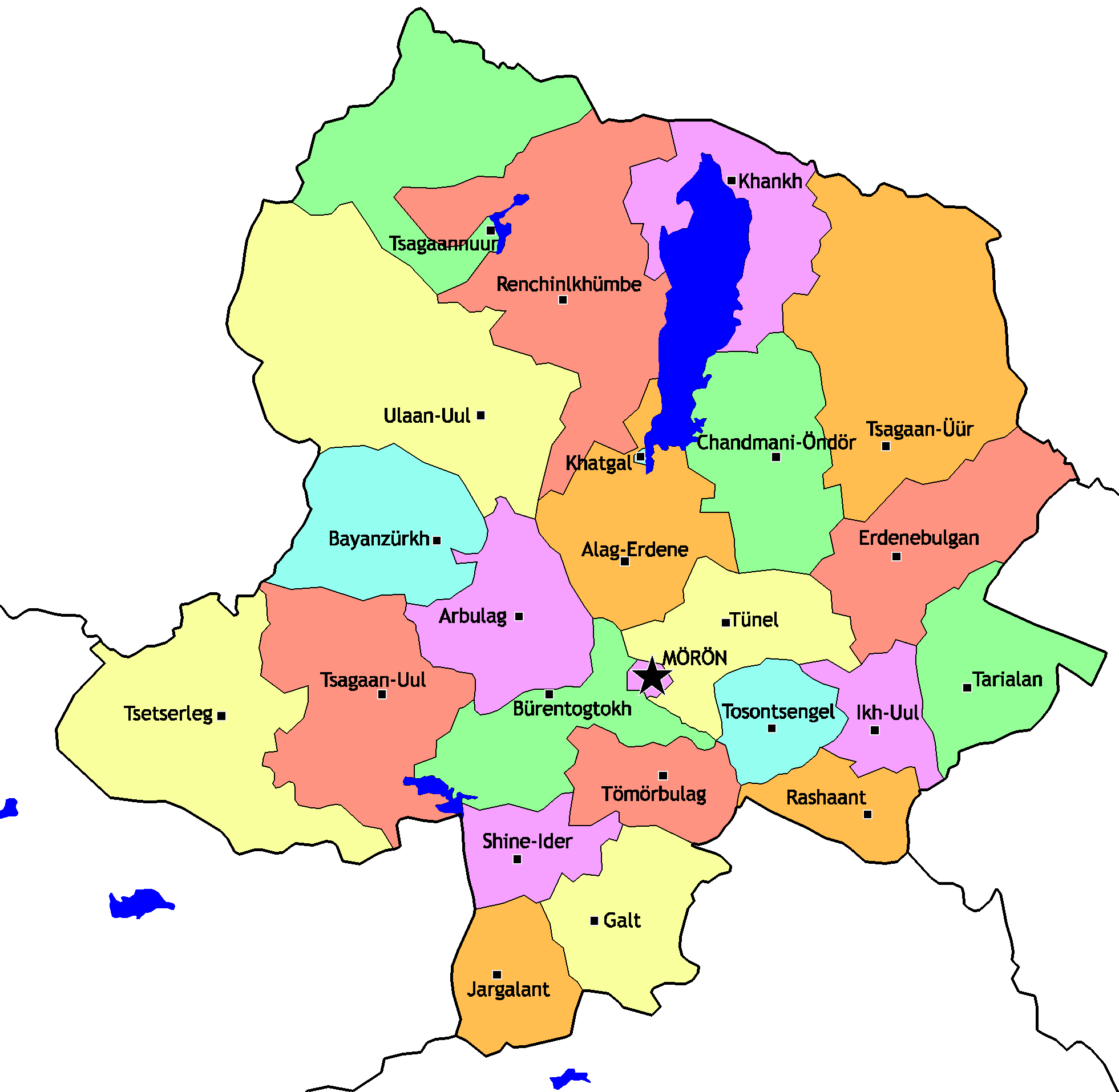
Districts of Khövsgöl Province

23 sum

- Alag-Erdene
- Arbulag
- Bayanzürkh
- Bürentogtokh
- Chandmani-Öndör
- Erdenebulgan
- Galt
- Khankh
- Ikh-Uul
- Jargalant
- Mörön
- Rashaant
- Renchinlkhümbe
- Shine-Ider
- Tarialan
- Tömörbulag
- Tosontsengel
- Tsagaan-Uul
- Tsagaannuur
- Tsagaan-Üür
- Tsetserleg
- Tünel
- Ulaan-Uul

== Ömnögovi Province ==
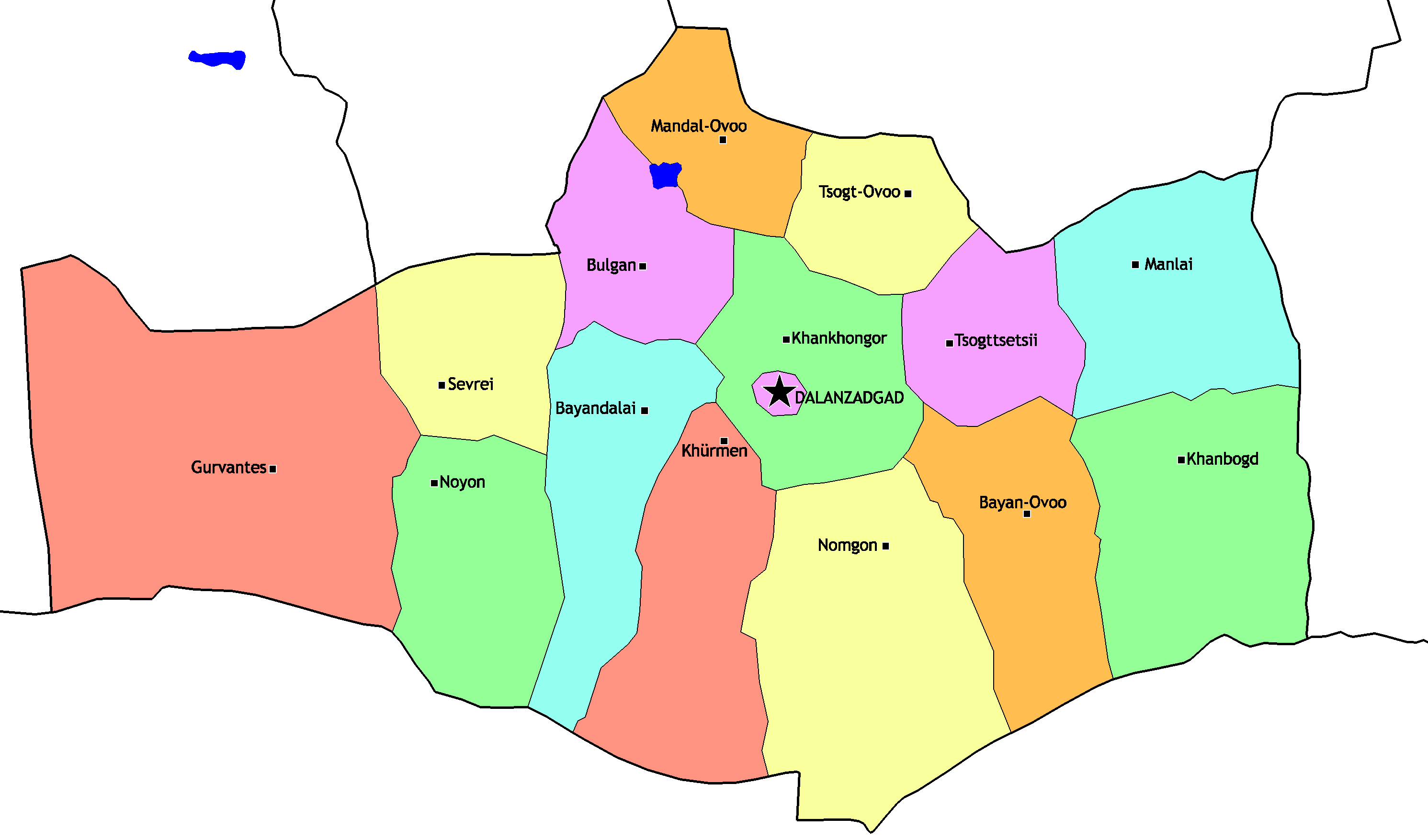
Districts of Ömnögovi Province

15 sum

- Bayan-Ovoo
- Bayandalai
- Bulgan
- Dalanzadgad
- Gurvan tes
- Khanbogd
- Khan khongor
- Khürmen
- Mandal-Ovoo
- Manlai
- Nomgon
- Noyon
- Sevrei
- Tsogt-Ovoo
- Tsogttsetsii

== Orkhon Province ==
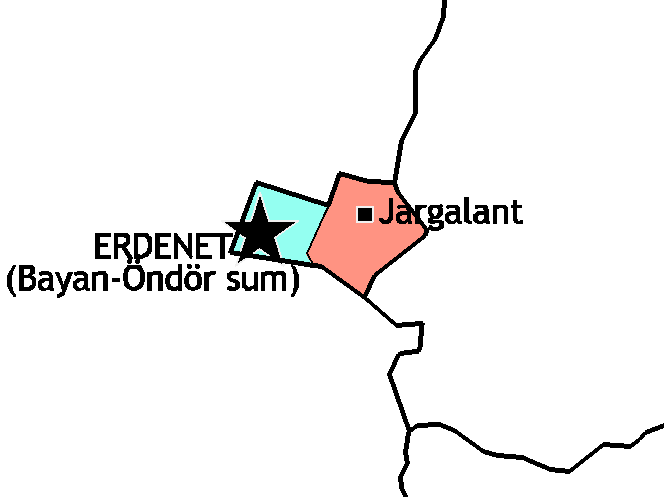
Districts of Orkhon Province

2 sum

- Bayan-Öndör
- Jargalant

== Övörkhangai Province ==
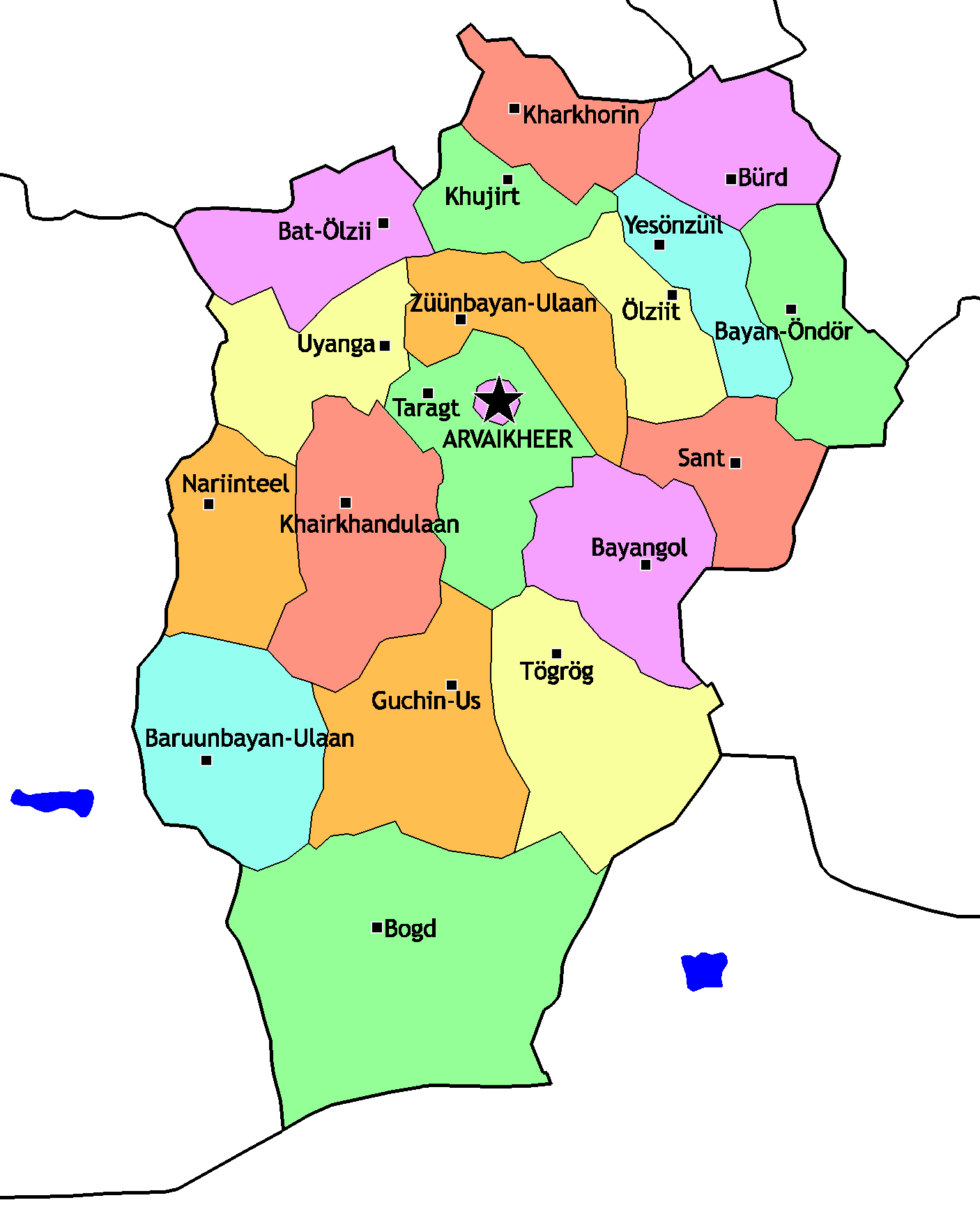
Districts of Övörkhangai Province

19 sum

- Arvaikheer
- Baruun Bayan-Ulaan
- Bat-Ölzii
- Bayan-Öndör
- Bayangol
- Bogd
- Bürd
- Guchin-Us
- Kharkhorin
- Khairkhandulaan
- Khujirt
- Nariinteel
- Ölziit
- Sant
- Taragt
- Tögrög
- Uyanga
- Yesönzüil
- Züünbayan-Ulaan

== Selenge Province ==
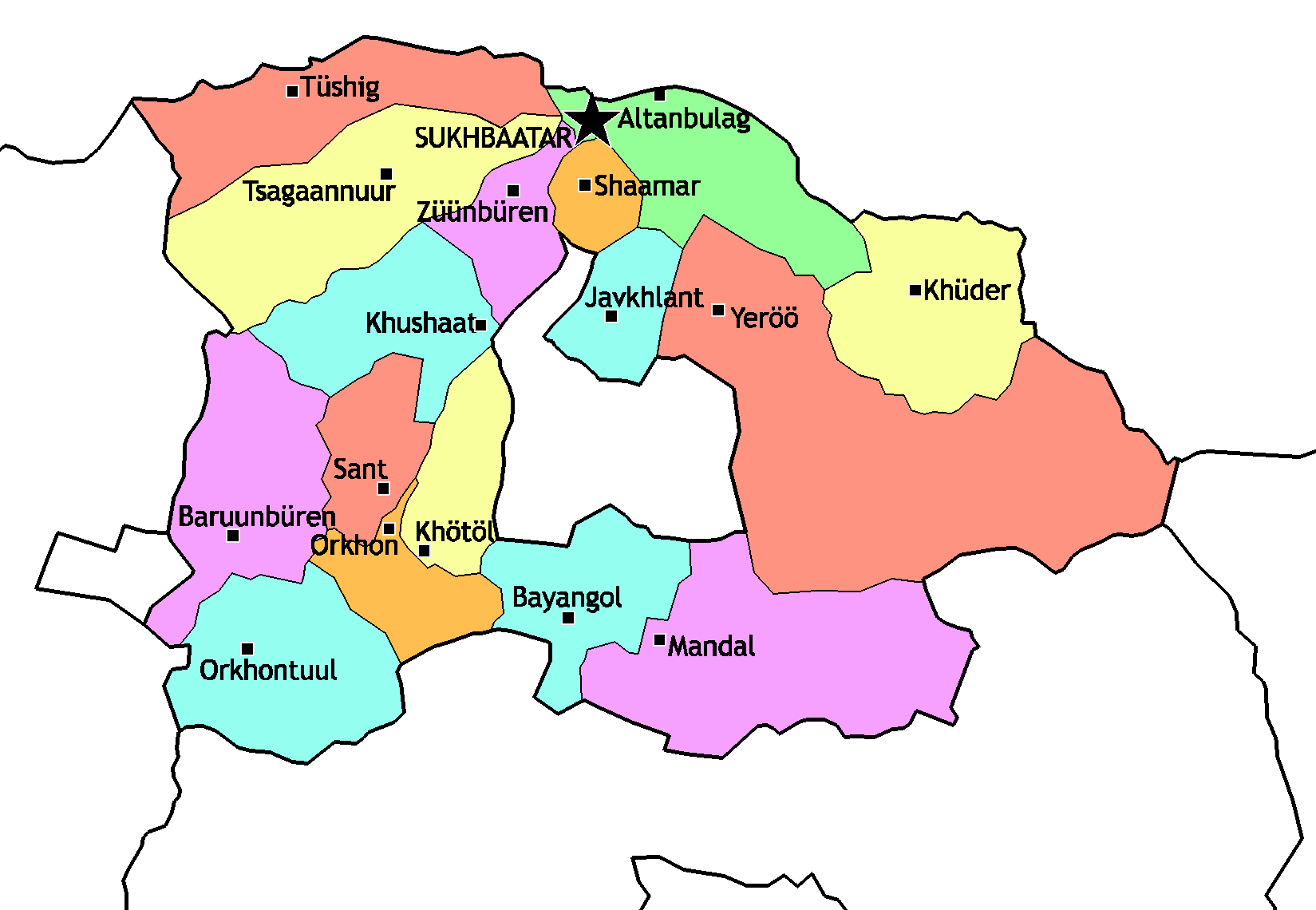
Districts of Selenge Province

17 sum

- Altanbulag
- Baruunbüren
- Bayangol
- Javkhlant
- Khüder
- Khushaat
- Mandal
- Orkhon
- Orkhontuul
- Sant
- Saikhan
- Shaamar
- Sükhbaatar
- Tsagaannuur
- Tüshig
- Yeröö
- Züünbüren

== Sükhbaatar Province ==
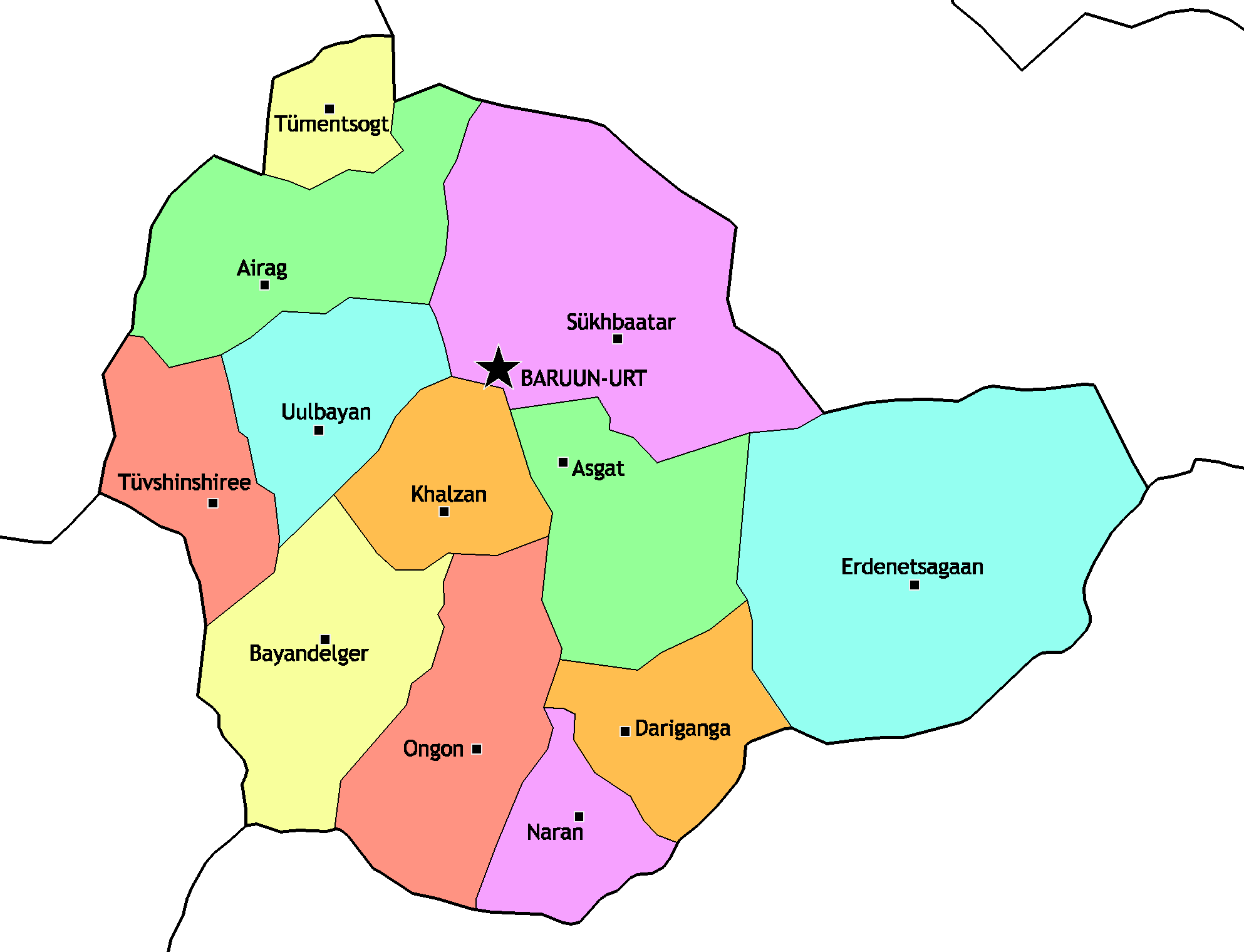
Districts of Sükhbaatar Province

13 sum

- Asgat
- Baruun-Urt
- Bayandelger
- Dariganga
- Erdenetsagaan
- Khalzan
- Mönkhkhaan
- Naran
- Ongon
- Sükhbaatar
- Tüvshinshiree
- Tümentsogt
- Uulbayan

== Töv Province ==
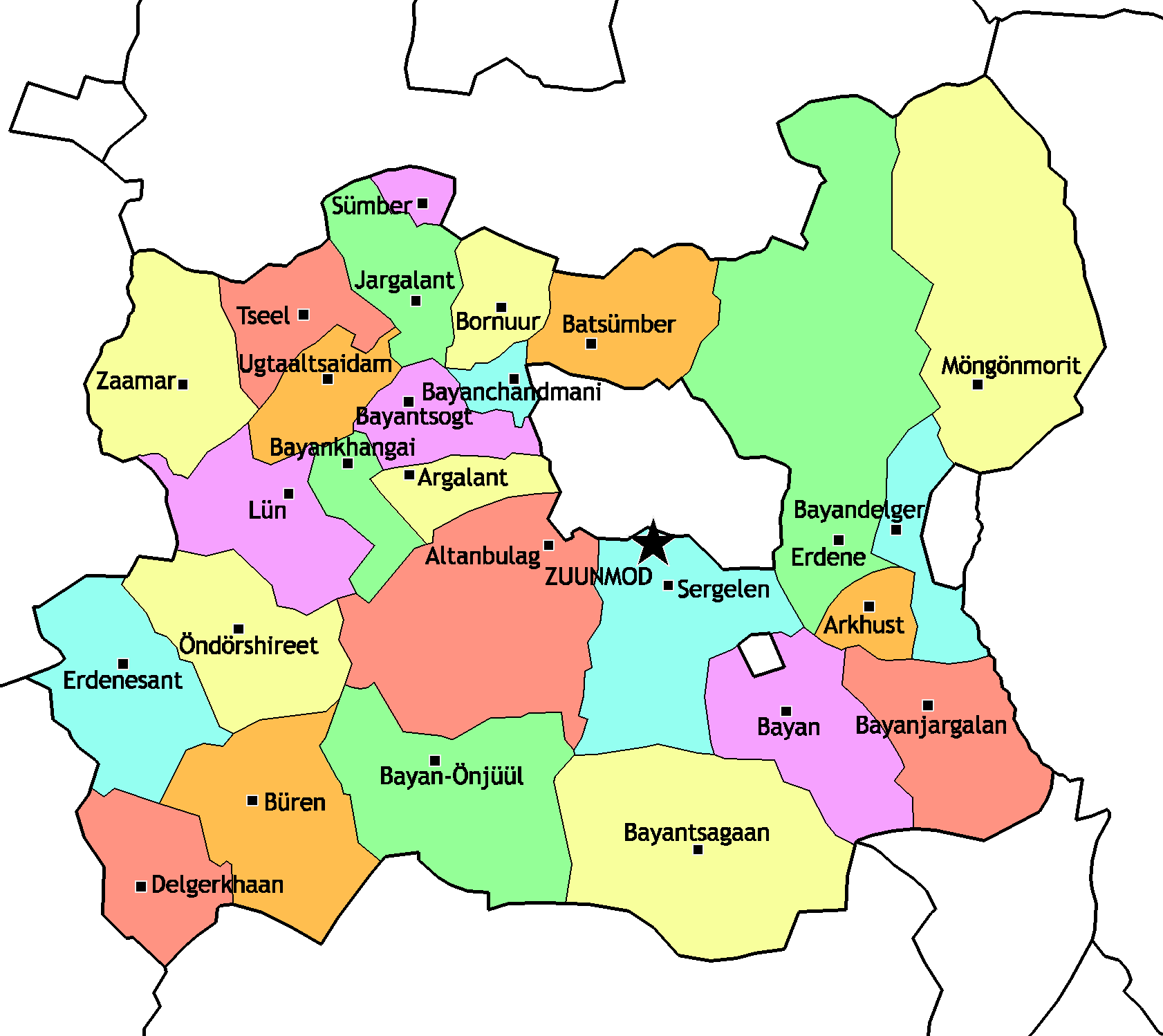
Districts of Töv Province

27 sum

- Altanbulag
- Argalant
- Arkhust
- Batsümber
- Bayan
- Bayan-Önjüül
- Bayanchandmani
- Bayandelger
- Bayanjargalan
- Bayankhangai
- Bayantsagaan
- Bayantsogt
- Bornuur
- Büren
- Delgerkhaan
- Erdene
- Erdenesant
- Jargalant
- Lün
- Möngönmort
- Öndörshireet
- Sergelen
- Sümber
- Tseel
- Ugtaal
- Zaamar
- Zuunmod

== Uvs Province ==
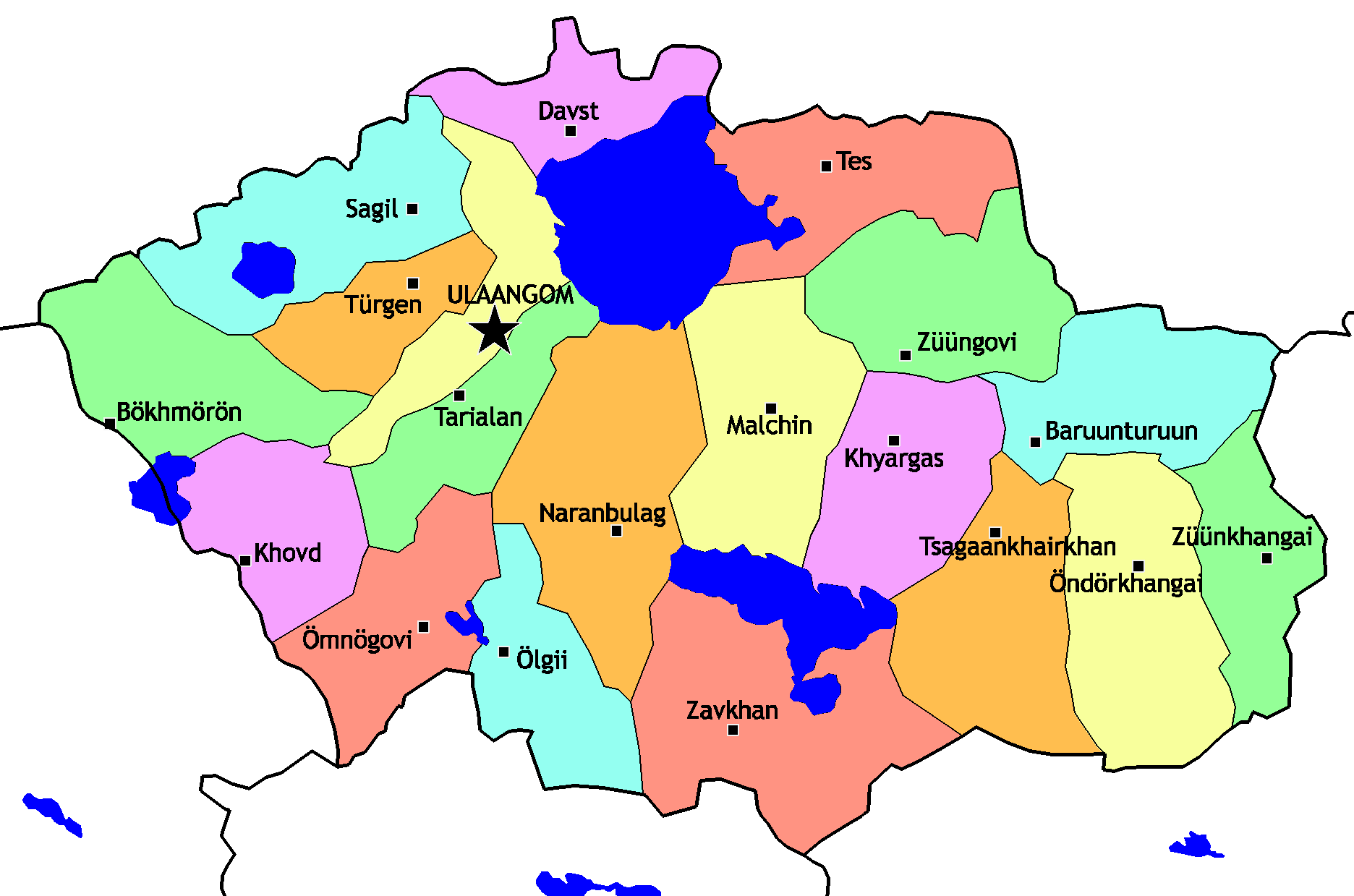
Districts of Uvs Province

19 sum

- Baruunturuun
- Bökhmörön
- Davst
- Khovd
- Khyargas
- Malchin
- Naranbulag
- Ölgii
- Ömnögovi
- Öndörkhangai
- Sagil
- Tarialan
- Tes
- Tsagaankhairkhan
- Türgen
- Ulaangom
- Zavkhan
- Züüngovi
- Züünkhangai

== Zavkhan Province ==
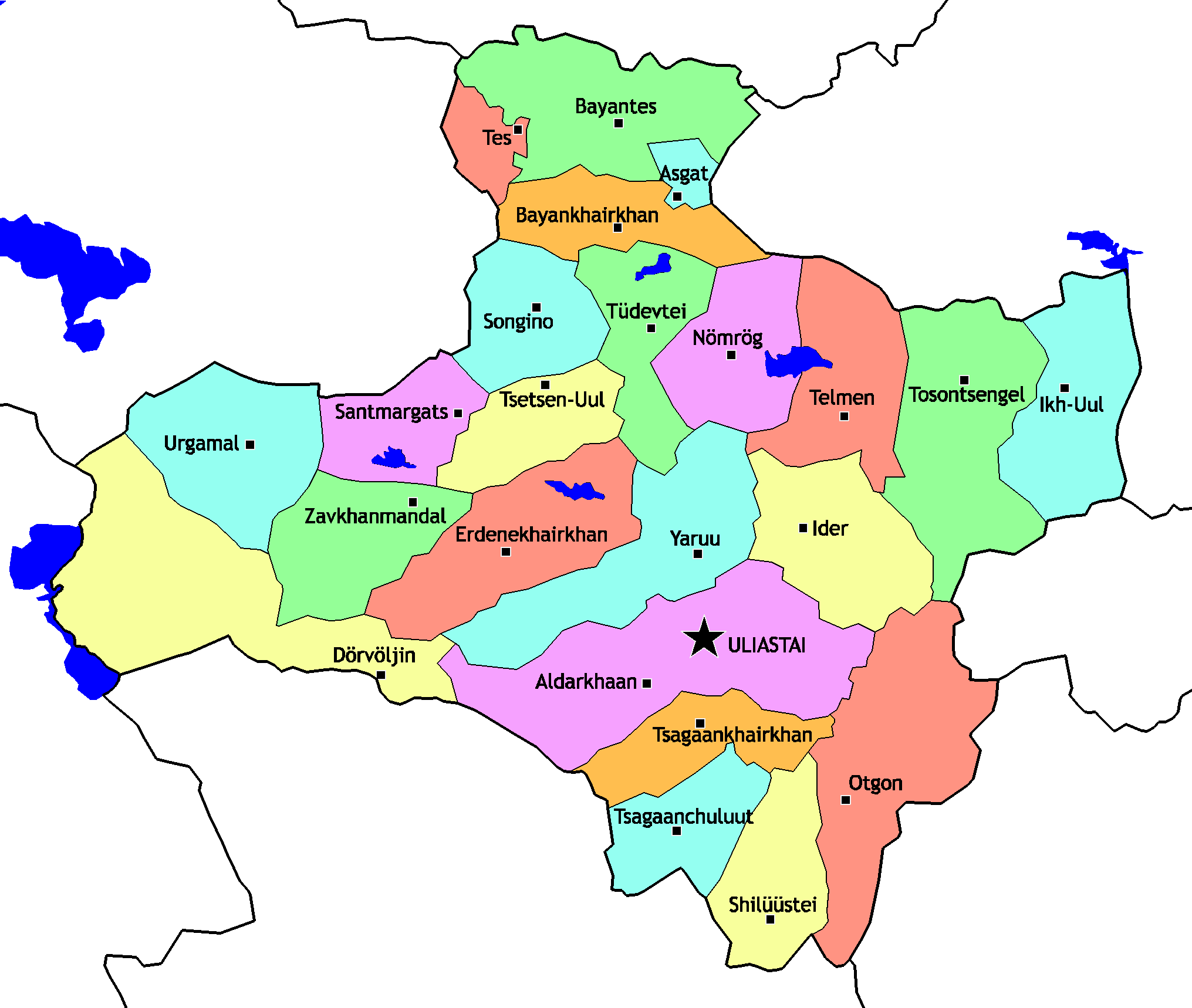
Districts of Zavkhan Province

24 sum

- Aldarkhaan
- Asgat
- Bayankhairkhan
- Bayantes
- Dörvöljin
- Erdenekhairkhan
- Ider
- Ikh-Uul
- Nömrög
- Otgon
- Santmargats
- Shilüüstei
- Songino
- Telmen
- Tes
- Tosontsengel
- Tsagaanchuluut
- Tsagaankhairkhan
- Tsetsen-Uul
- Tüdevtei
- Uliastai
- Urgamal
- Yaruu
- Zavkhanmandal

== References and external links ==
- All Mongolian sums population 2009.12.31
