= Guchin-Us, Övörkhangai =

District in Övörkhangai Province, Mongolia

Coordinates: 45°27′42″N 102°25′27″E

Guchin-Us Soum Гучин-Ус сум ᠭᠤᠴᠢᠨᠤᠰᠤᠰᠤᠮᠤ
- District
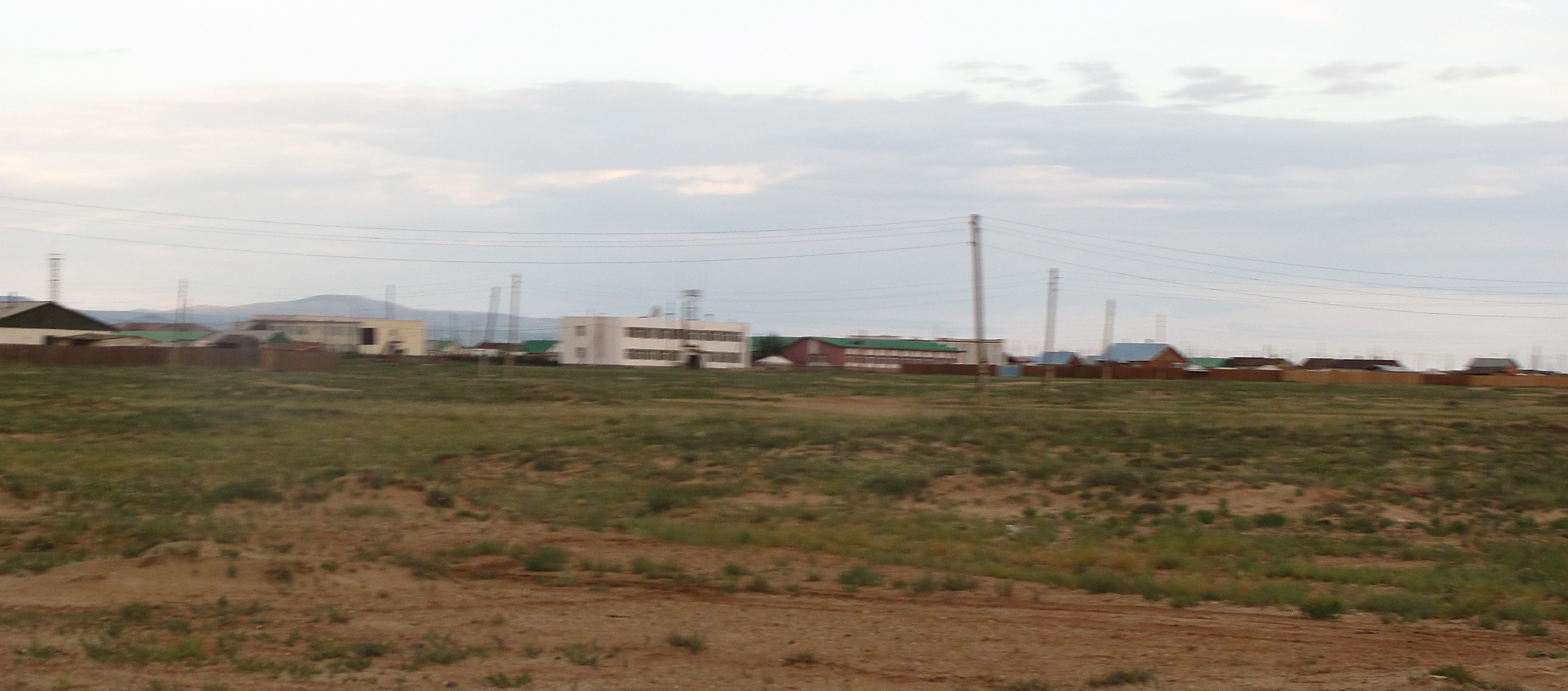
- General view of Arguut

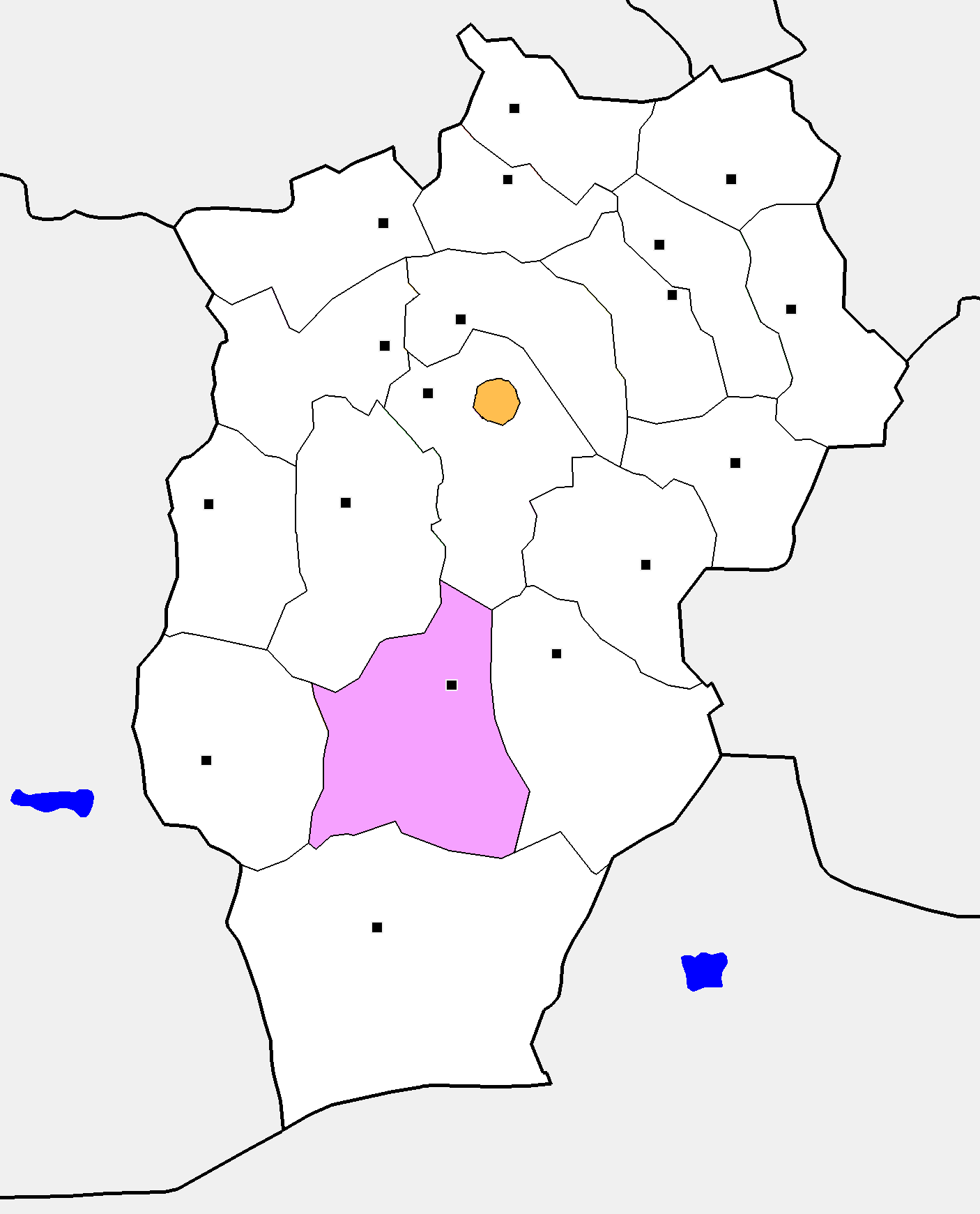
- Guchin-Us District in Övörkhangai Province
- Country: Mongolia
- Province: Övörkhangai Province
- Time zone: UTC+8 (UTC + 8)

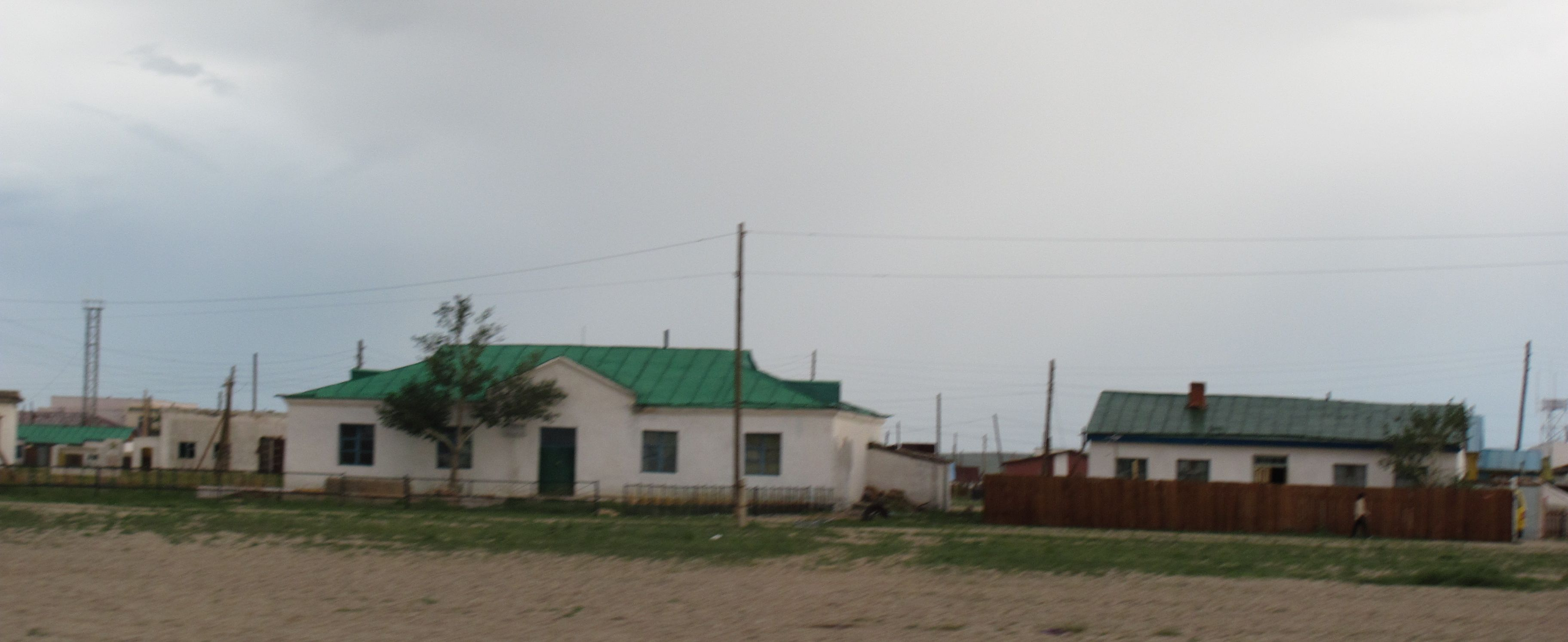
Center of Arguut

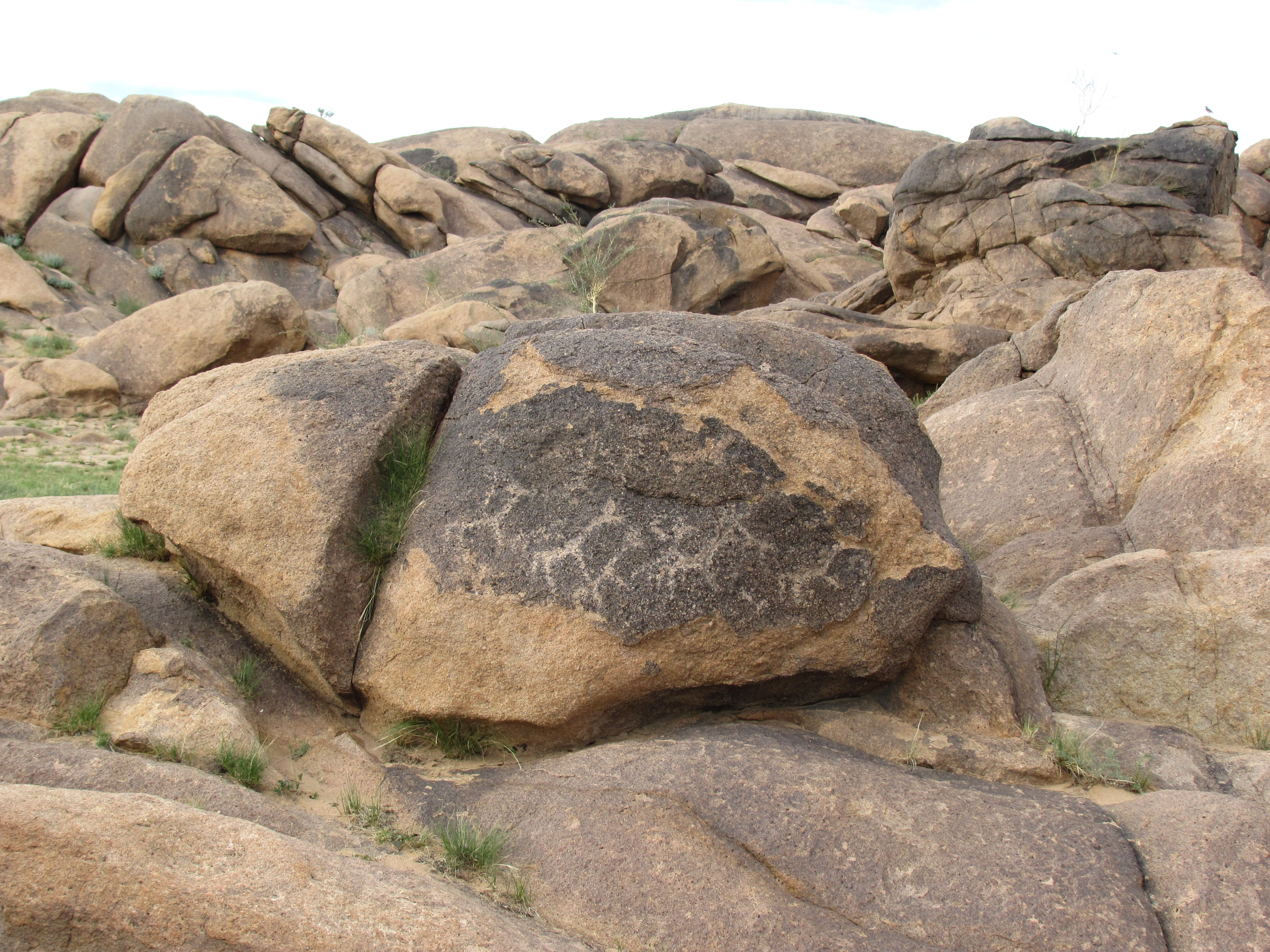
Rock paintings

Guchin-Us (Mongolian: Гучин-Ус, meaning is Thirty water) is a sum (district) of Övörkhangai Province in southern Mongolia. It had an estimated 2,260 inhabitants in 2008.

The town of Arguut, 104 km from the Province capital Arvaikheer, is the administrative center of the soum, but mostly it is called "Guchin Us" as well.

There are several prehistoric rock paintings and buddhist inscriptions in the north-east of the town, close to the unpaved road to Arvaikheer.

== Administrative divisions ==
The district is divided into four bags, which are:

- Argalant
- Arguit
- Guchin
- Khuuvur
