= Züünbayan-Ulaan, Övörkhangai =

District in Övörkhangai Province, Mongolia

Coordinates: 46°31′20″N 102°35′45″E

Züünbayan-Ulaan District Зүүнбаян-Улаан сум ᠵᠡᠭᠦᠨ ᠪᠠᠶ᠋ᠠᠨ ᠤᠯᠠᠭᠠᠨ ᠰᠤᠮᠤ
- District
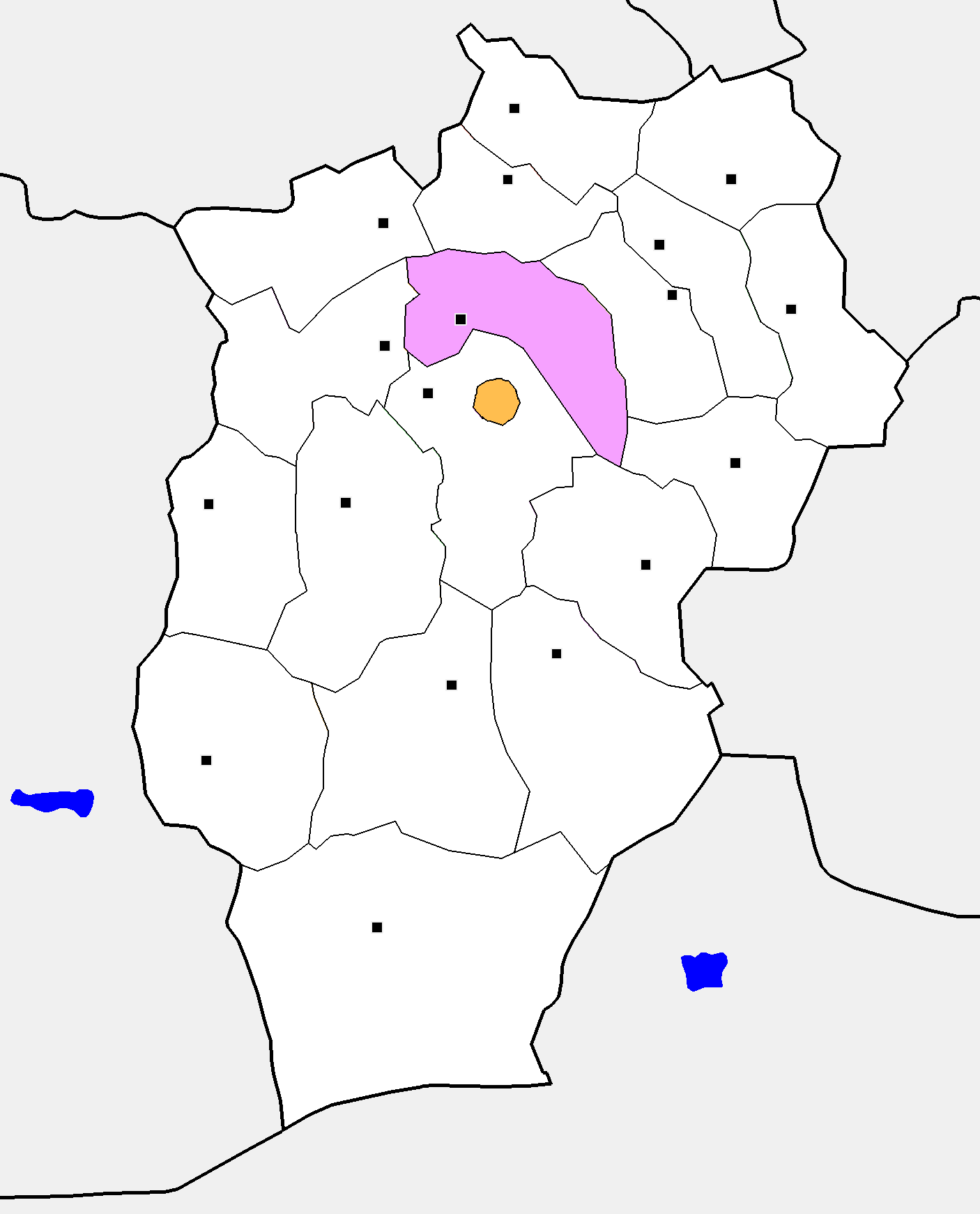
- Züünbayan-Ulaan District in Övörkhangai Province
- Country: Mongolia
- Province: Övörkhangai Province
- Time zone: UTC+8 (UTC + 8)

Züünbayan-Ulaan (Mongolian: Зүүн Баян-Улаан, East rich red) is a sum (district) of Övörkhangai Province in southern Mongolia. In 2008, its population was 4,436.

== Administrative divisions ==
The district is divided into six bags, which are:

- Bayan-Ulaan
- Devshil
- Emged
- Khad
- Tsakhiurt
- Tsokhiot
