= Baruun Bayan-Ulaan, Övörkhangai =

District in Övörkhangai, Mongolia

Baruun Bayan-Ulaan District Баруунбаян-Улаан сум ᠪᠠᠷᠠᠭᠤᠨᠪᠠᠶ᠋ᠠᠨᠤᠯᠠᠭᠠᠨᠰᠤᠮᠤ
- District
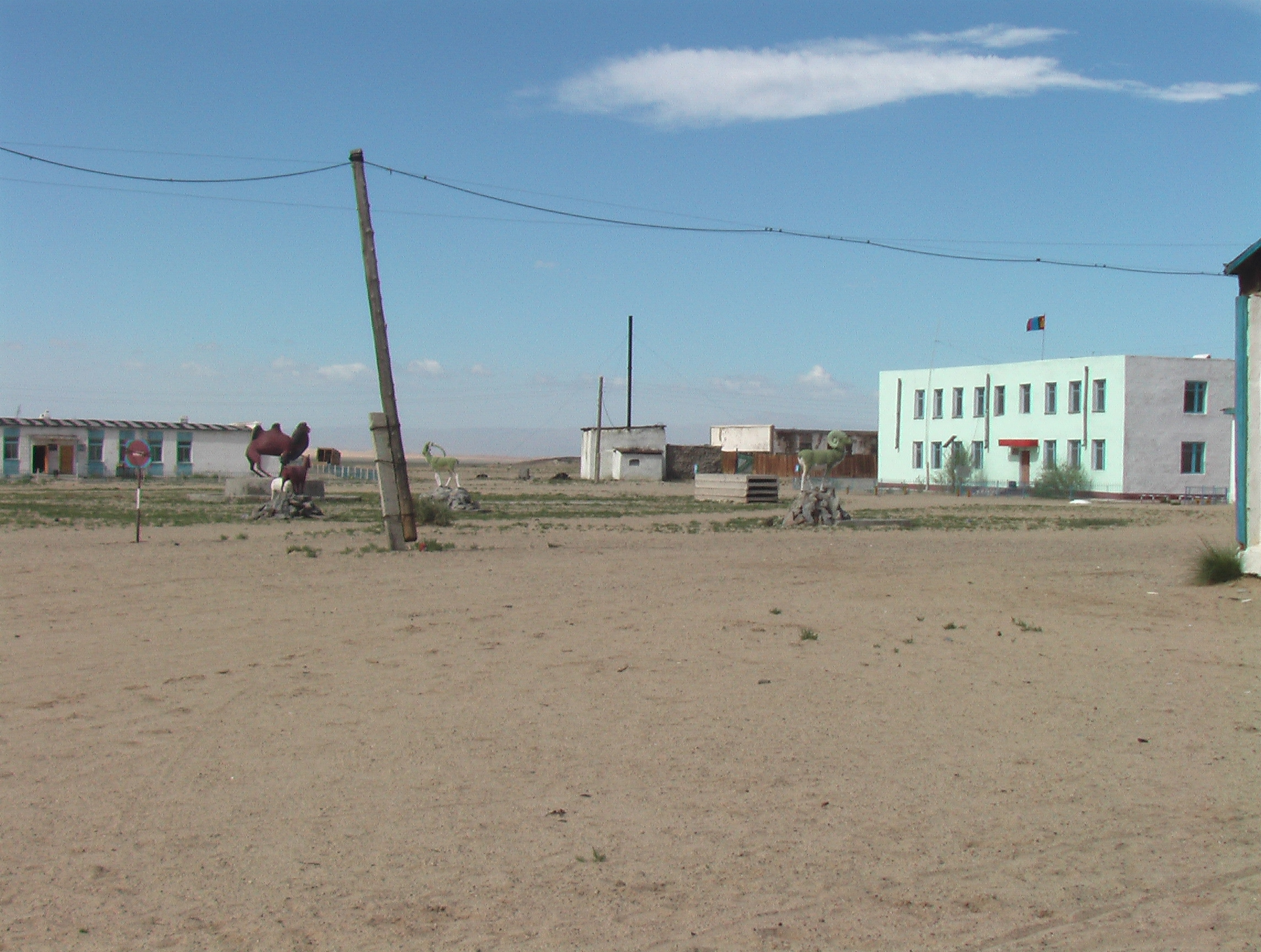
- Baruun Bayan-Ulaan sum centre

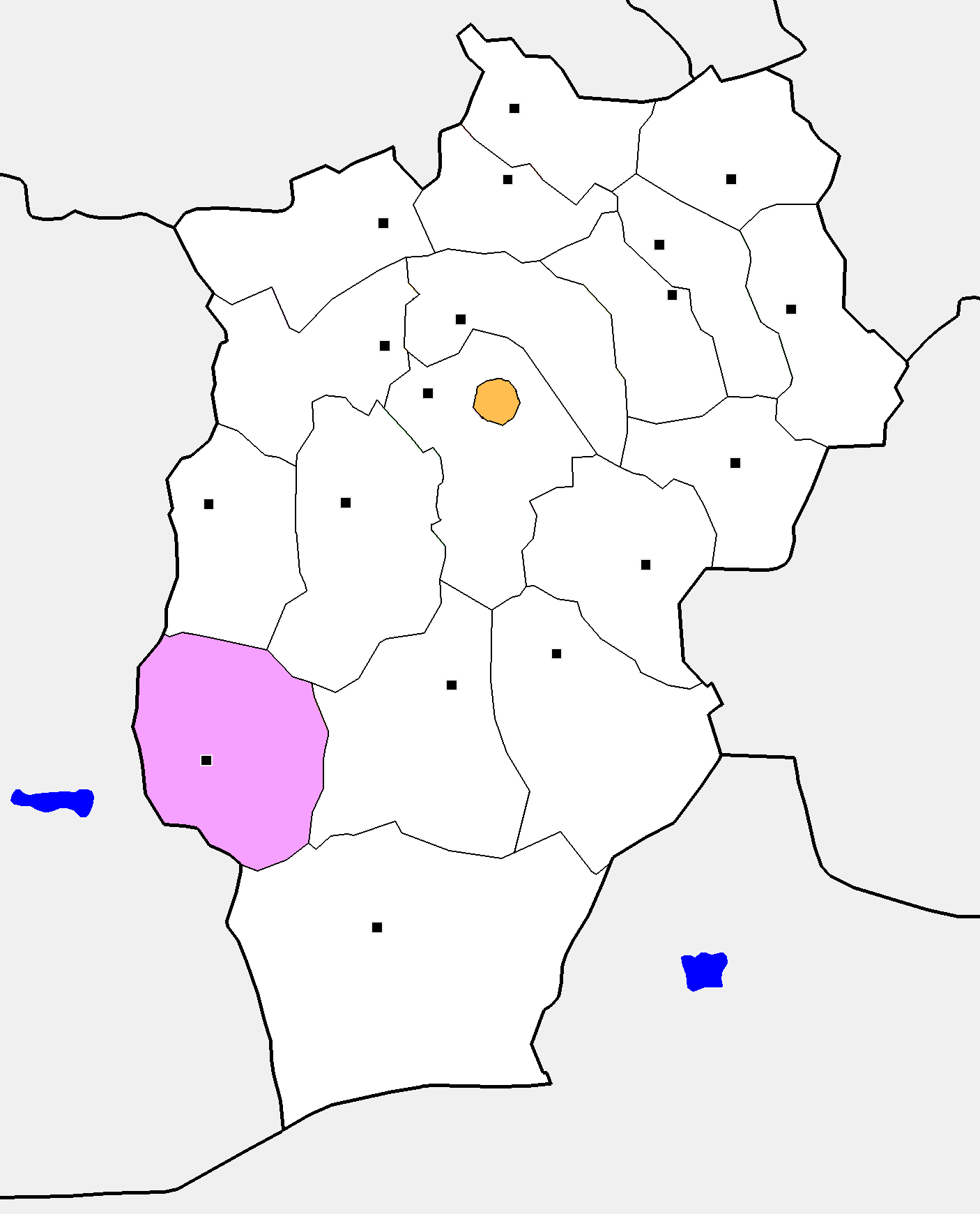
- Baruun Bayan-Ulaan District in Övörkhangai Province

- Location within Mongolia
- Coordinates: 45°10′37″N 101°25′11″E
- Country: Mongolia
- Province: Övörkhangai Province
- Time zone: UTC+8 (UTC + 8)

Baruun Bayan-Ulaan (Mongolian: Баруун Баян-Улаан, West rich red) is a sum (district) of Övörkhangai Province in southern Mongolia. In 2008, its population was 2,556.

== Geography ==
Baruun Bayan-Ulaan is the western most district in Övörkhangai Province.

== Administrative divisions ==
The district is divided into four bags:

- Khuukhdiin-Us
- Khuuvur
- Tsagaan Ovoo
- Ulziit Khoshuu
