= Bürd, Övörkhangai =

District in Övörkhangai Province, Mongolia

Coordinates: 46°58′56″N 103°47′11″E

Bürd District Бүрд сум ᠪᠦᠷᠢᠳᠦᠰᠤᠮᠤ
- District
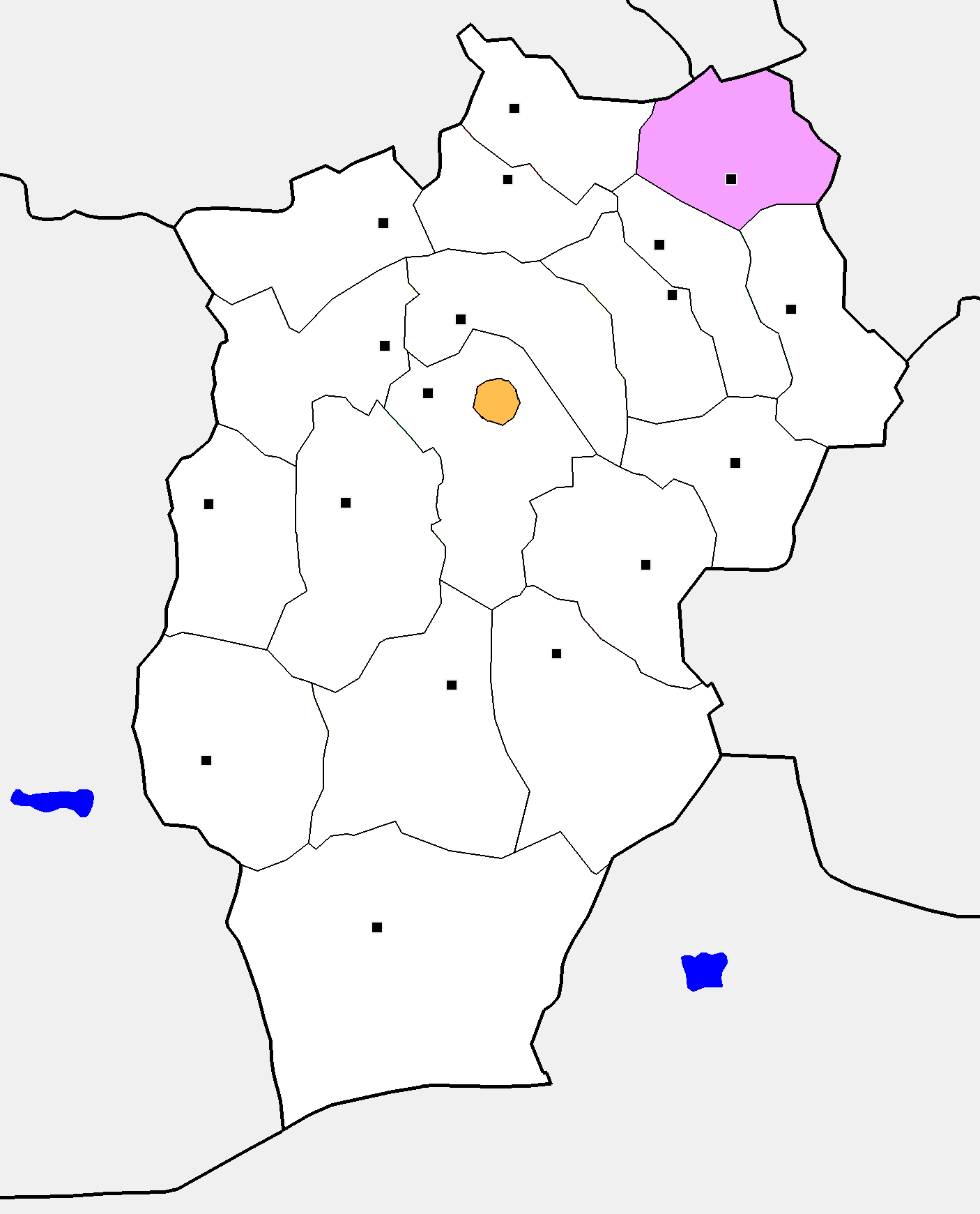
- Bürd District in Övörkhangai Province
- Country: Mongolia
- Province: Övörkhangai Province
- Time zone: UTC+8 (UTC + 8)

Bürd (Mongolian: Бүрд "Oasis") is a sum (district) of Övörkhangai Province in southern Mongolia. In 2008, its population was 3,135.

Bürd sum was where what would become the modern Mongolian capital of Ulaanbaatar was founded. It was established near Shireet Tsagaan Nuur, a lake in the north of the sum in 1639, to be the seat of Zanabazar.

== Administrative divisions ==
The district is divided into five bags, which are:

- Ar Jargalant
- Ar Khushuut
- Dongit
- Ikh Borigdoi
- Ongon
