= Bayangol, Övörkhangai =

District in Övörkhangai Province, Mongolia

Bayangol District Баянгол сум ᠪᠠᠶ᠋ᠠᠩᠭ᠋ᠣᠤᠯᠰᠤᠮᠤ
- District
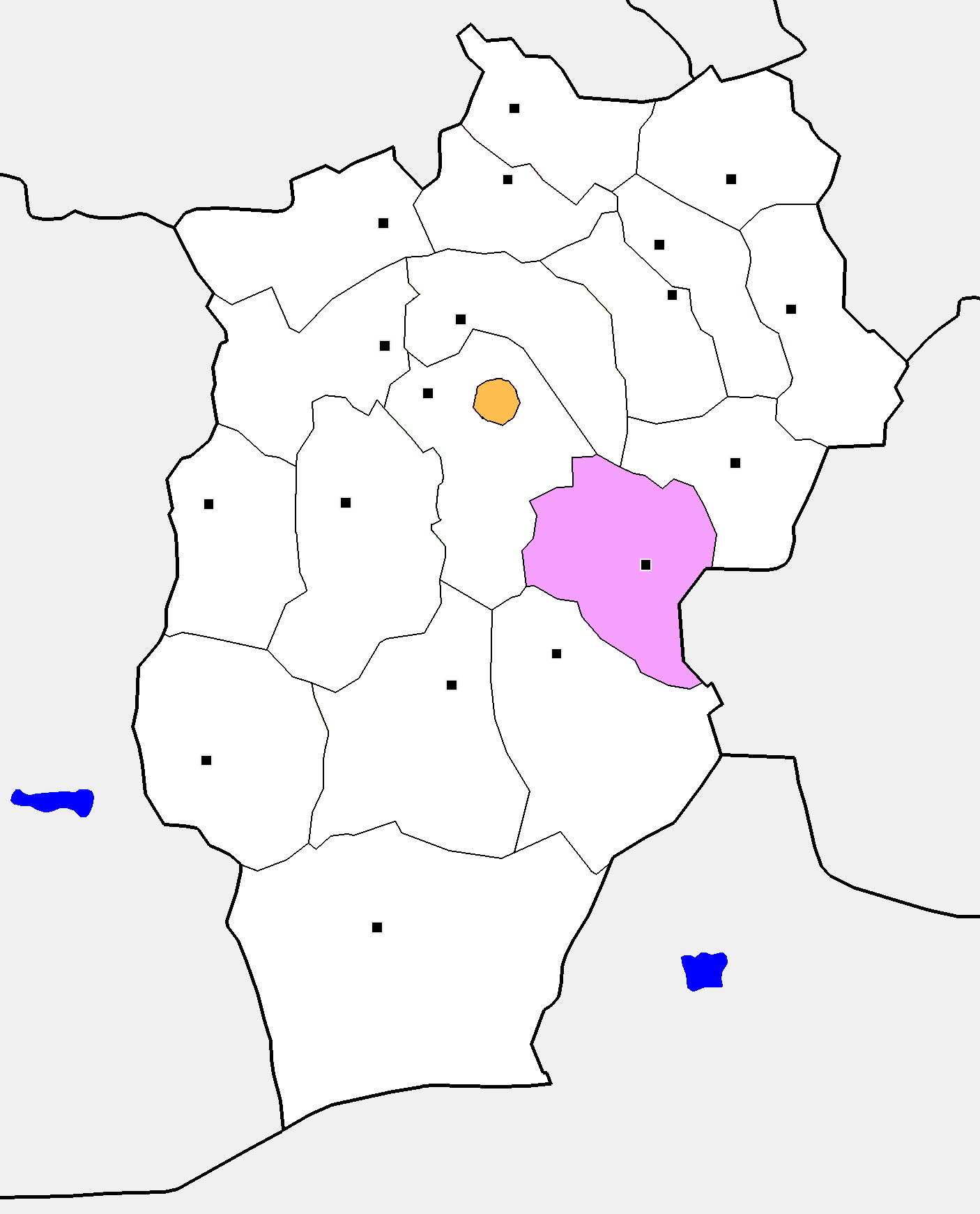
- Bayangol District in Övörkhangai Province

- Location in Mongolia
- Coordinates: 45°48′35″N 103°26′59″E
- Country: Mongolia
- Province: Övörkhangai Province

Area
  - Total: 3,543 km^{2} (1,368 sq mi)

Population (2008)
  - Total: 4,572
- Time zone: UTC+8 (UTC + 8)

Bayangol (Mongolian: Баянгол, Mongolian: rich river) is a sum (district) of Övörkhangai Province in southern Mongolia. In 2008, its population was 4,572.

== Administrative divisions ==
The district is divided into six bags, which are:

- Ergen denj
- Khayaa
- Shiree
- Tsagaan bulan
- Tsaviin-Ikher
- Undur unts
