= Bogd, Övörkhangai =

District in Övörkhangai Province, Mongolia

Coordinates: 44°40′11″N 102°10′28″E

Bogd District Богд сум ᠪᠣᠭᠳᠠᠰᠤᠮᠤ
- District
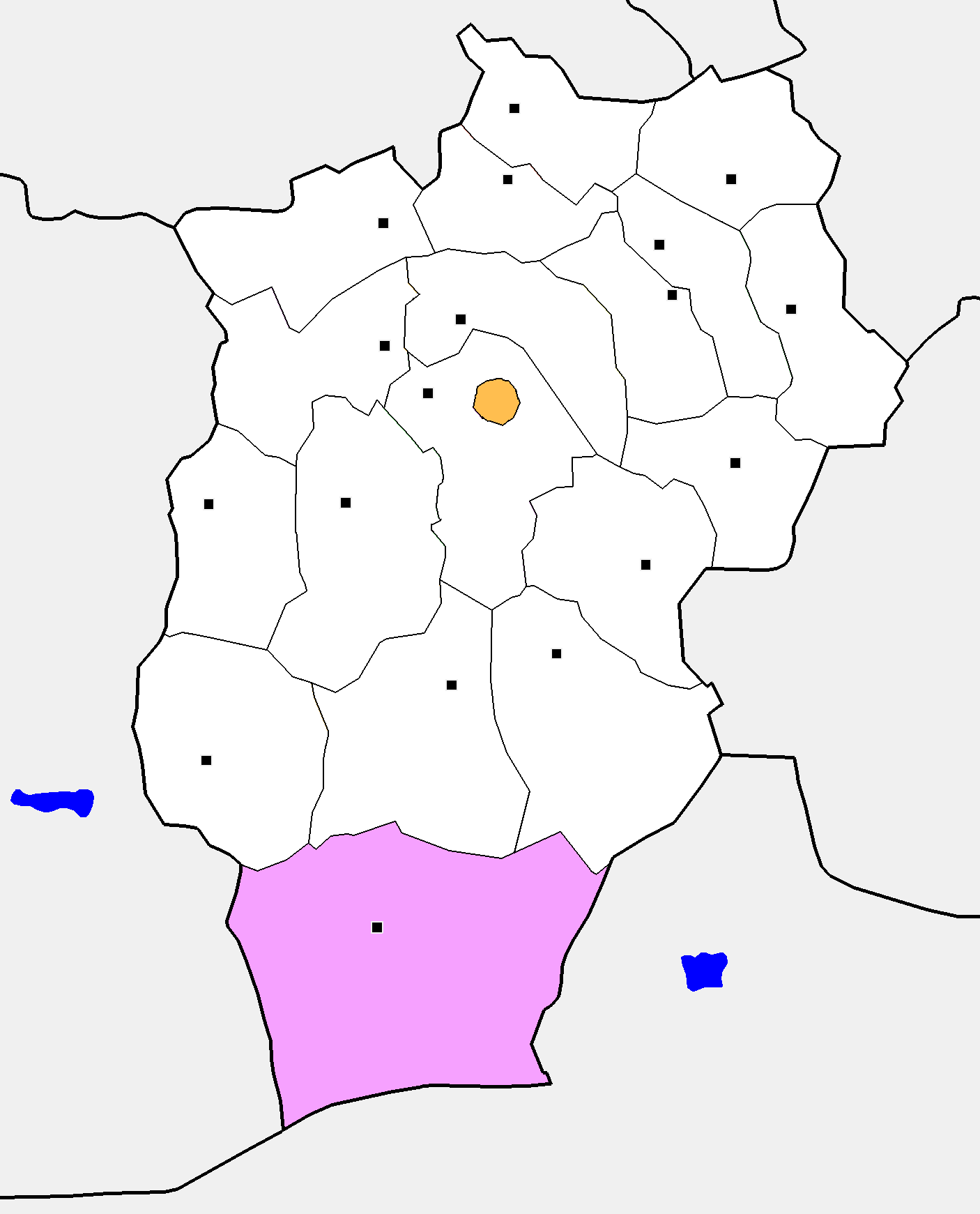
- Bogd District in Övörkhangai Province
- Country: Mongolia
- Province: Övörkhangai Province
- Time zone: UTC+8 (UTC + 8)

Bogd (Mongolian: Богд "holy") is a sum (district) of Övörkhangai Province in southern Mongolia. In 2008, its population was 5,342.

== Geography ==
Bogd is the largest and southern most district in Övörkhangai Province.

== Administrative divisions ==
The district is divided into seven bags, which are:

- Bayan Tukhum
- Dalan
- Gun-Us
- Khovd
- Khuuvur
- Ulziit Khoshuu
- Yalaatai
