= Telephone numbers in Mongolia =

- Country: Mongolia
- Continent: Asia
- NSN length: 8
- Country code: 976
- International access: 001, 002, 003, 008, 009
- Long-distance: 01, 02

976 is the telephone country code for Mongolia.

== Numbering ==
National significant numbers (NSN) consist of eight digits. The national telephone numbering plan defines two domestic long-distance access codes: 01 (Mongolia Telecom network) and 02 (Mongolian Railway network).

Type of service	Numbering	Examples
Emergency and special calls	1XX; 1XXX; 1XXXX	101 – Fire; 1610 – “Speed” Information Agency of Mongolian Radio
Fixed telephone services	Access code + area code + exchange code + subscriber number	Mongolia Telecom subscribers 01+1+45+2222 (+976 1 145 2222); 01+21+2+2222; 01+372+2+2222; 01+3741+2+222; Mongolian Railway subscribers 02+1+94+2222 (+976 2 194 2222); 02+21+4+2222; 02+372+4+2222; 02+3741+4+222
Cellular telephone services	Mobile phone numbers in Mongolia consist of 8 digits, starting with 9, 8 or 6.	90 XXXXXX - Skytel; 91 XXXXXX - Skytel; 92 XXXXXX - Skytel; 93 XXXXXX - G-Mobile; 94 XXXXXX - Mobicom; 95 XXXXXX - Mobicom; 96 XXXXXX - Skytel; 97 XXXXXX - G-Mobile; 98 XXXXXX - G-Mobile; 99 XXXXXX - Mobicom 80 XXXXXX - Unitel; 81 XXXXXX - unallocated 82 XXXXXX - unallocated 83 XXXXXX - G-Mobile; 84 XXXXXX - unallocated 85 XXXXXX - Mobicom; 86 XXXXXX - Unitel; 87 XXXXXX - unallocated 88 XXXXXX - Unitel; 89 XXXXXX - Unitel 69 6XXXXX - Skytel; 66 XXXXXX - ONDO; 60 XXXXXX - ONDO
VoIP services	VoIP operator prefix + subscriber number	70+112222 72+112222 75+112222 77+112222
Wireless local loops	Service identification code + operator selection + subscriber number or operator selection code + subscriber number	0+5B+XXXXXX

Number Format
Type of network	Access code length	Trunk code length	Subscriber number length (with exchange code)	Total length
PSTN	two three	one (Ulaanbaatar) two (Baganuur) three (Aimag centers) four (Sum centers)	six six or five five four	nine – ten
Cellular telephone services		three (with SIC) two (without SIC)	five six	eight

== Area codes ==
The following is a list of area codes in the provinces of Mongolia.

Area codes since 2004/2005
Area code	Region	Area code	Region	Area code	Region
	capital region				
1	Ulaanbaatar				
21	Baganuur	22	Bagakhangai	23	Nalaikh
27**	Töv aimag				
272	Zuunmod city				
2741	Altanbulag	2751	Bayantsagaan	2761	Möngönmorit
2742	Argalant	2752	Bayantsogt	2762	Öndörshireet
2743	Arkhust	2753	Bayanchandmani	2763	Sümber
2744	Batsümber	2754	Bornuur	2764	Sergelen
2745	Bayan	2755	Büren	2765	Ugtaal
2746	Bayandelger	2756	Delgerkhaan	2766	Tseel
2747	Bayanjargalan	2757	Jargalant	2767	Erdene
2748	Bayan-Önjüül	2758	Zaamar (Khailaast)	2768	Erdenesant
2749	Bayankhangai	2759	Lün		
32**	Övörkhangai aimag				
322	Arvaikheer city				
3241	Baruun Bayan-Ulaan	3251	Nariinteel		
3242	Bat-Ölzii	3252	Ölziit		
3243	Bayangol	3253	Sant		
3244	Bayan-Öndör	3254	Taragt		
3245	Bogd	3255	Tögrög		
3246	Bürd	3256	Uyanga		
3247	Guchin-Us	3257	Khairkhandulaan		
3248	Yesönzüil	3258	Kharkhorin		
3249	Züünbayan-Ulaan	3259	Khujirt		
33**	Arkhangai aimag				
332	Tsetserleg city (Bulgan sum)				
3341	Battsengel	3351	Khairkhan		
3342	Bulgan	3352	Khangai		
3343	Jargalant	3353	Khashaat		
3344	Ikh-Tamir	3354	Khotont		
3345	Ögii nuur	3355	Tsakhir		
3346	Ölziit	3356	Tsenkher		
3347	Öndör-Ulaan	3357	Tsetserleg		
3348	Tariat	3358	Chuluut		
3349	Tüvshrüülekh	3359	Erdenemandal		
34**	Bulgan aimag				
342	Bulgan city				
3441	Bayan-Agt	3451	Saikhan (Saikhan-Ovoo)		
3442	Bayannuur	3452	Selenge (Khyalganat)		
3443	Bugat	3453	Teshig		
3444	Büregkhangai	3454	Khangal		
3445	Gurvanbulag	3455	Khishig-Öndör		
3446	Dashinchilen	3456	Khutag-Öndör		
3447	Mogod				
3448	Orkhon				
3449	Rashaant				
35**	Orkhon aimag				
352	Erdenet city (Bayan-Öndör sum)				
3541	Jargalant				
36**	Selenge aimag				
362	Sükhbaatar city				
3641	Altanbulag	3651	Saikhan (Khötöl)		
3642	Baruunbüren	3652	Sant		
3643	Bayangol	3653	Tüshig		
3644	Yeröö (Bugant)	3654	Khüder		
3645	Javkhlant	3655	Khushaat		
3646	Züünbüren	3656	Tsagaannuur		
3647	Mandal (Züünkharaa, Tünkhel, Kherkh)	3657	Shaamar (Dulankhaan)		
3648	Orkhon				
3649	Orkhontuul				
37**	Darkhan-Uul aimag				
372	Darkhan city				
3741	Orkhon	3742	Khongor (Salkhit)	3743	Sharyngol
38**	Khövsgöl aimag				
382	Mörön city				
3841	Alag-Erdene (Khatgal)	3851	Tarialan	3861	Tsagaan-Üür
3842	Arbulag	3852	Tosontsengel	3862	Tsetserleg (Mogoin gol)
3843	Bayanzürkh	3853	Tömörbulag	3863	Chandmani-Öndör
3844	Bürentogtokh	3854	Tünel	3864	Shine-Ider
3845	Galt	3855	Ulaan-Uul	3865	Erdenebulgan
3846	Jargalant	3856	Khankh		
3847	Ikh-Uul	3857	Khatgal		
3848	Rashaant	3858	Tsagaannuur		
3849	Renchinlkhümbe	3859	Tsagaan-Uul		
42**	Bayan-Ölgii aimag				
422	Ölgii city				
4241	Altai	4251	Tolbo		
4242	Altantsögts	4252	Ulaankhus		
4243	Bayannuur	4253	Tsengel		
4244	Bugat				
4245	Bulgan				
4246	Buyant				
4247	Delüün				
4248	Nogoonnuur, Tsagaannuur				
4249	Sagsai				
43**	Khovd aimag				
432	Khovd city (Jargalant sum)				
4341	Altai	4351	Möst		
4342	Bulgan	4352	Myangad		
4343	Buyant	4353	Üyench		
4344	Darvi	4354	Khovd sum		
4345	Dörgön	4355	Tsetseg (Khushuut)		
4346	Duut	4356	Chandmani		
4347	Zereg	4357	Erdenebüren		
4348	Mankhan				
4349	Mönkhkhairkhan				
44**	Bayankhongor aimag				
442	Bayankhongor city				
4441	Baatsagaan	4451	Buutsagaan	4461	Erdenetsogt (Shaigaljuut)
4442	Bayanbulag	4452	Galuut		
4443	Bayangovi	4453	Gurvanbulag		
4444	Bayanlig	4454	Jargalant		
4445	Bayan-Ovoo	4455	Jinst		
4446	Bayan-Öndör	4456	Zag		
4447	Bayantsagaan	4457	Ölziit		
4448	Bogd	4458	Khüreemaral		
4449	Bömbögör	4459	Shinejinst		
45**	Uvs aimag				
452	Ulaangom city				
4541	Baruunturuun	4551	Ömnögovi		
4542	Bökhmörön	4552	Öndörkhangai		
4543	Davst	4553	Sagil		
4544	Zavkhan	4554	Tarialan (Khar Tarvagatai)		
4545	Züüngovi	4555	Türgen		
4546	Züünkhangai	4556	Tes		
4547	Malchin	4557	Khovd		
4548	Naranbulag	4558	Khyargas		
4549	Ölgii	4559	Tsagaankhairkhan		
46**	Zavkhan aimag				
462	Uliastai city				
4641	Aldarkhaan	4651	Nömrög	4651	Tsagaanchuluut
4642	Asgat	4652	Otgon	4652	Tsetsen-Uul
4643	Bayantes	4653	Santmargats	4653	Shilüüstei
4644	Bayankhairhan	4654	Songino	4654	Erdenekhairkhan
4645	Tosontsengel (Bulnai)	4655	Tüdevtei	4655	Yaruu
4646	Dörvöljin	4656	Telmen		
4647	Zavkhanmandal	4657	Tes		
4648	Ider	4658	Urgamal		
4649	Ikh-Uul	4659	Tsagaankhairkhan		
48**	Govi-Altai aimag				
482	Altai city (Yesönbulag sum)				
4841	Altai sum	4851	Tögrög		
4842	Bayan-Uul	4852	Khaliun		
4843	Biger	4853	Khökh morit		
4844	Bugat	4854	Tsogt (Bayantooroi)		
4845	Darvi	4855	Tseel		
4846	Delger (Guulin)	4856	Chandmani (Zeegt)		
4847	Jargalan	4857	Sharga		
4848	Taishir	4858	Erdene		
4849	Tonkhil				
51**	Sükhbaatar aimag				
512	Baruun-Urt city				
5141	Asgat	5151	Uulbayan		
5142	Bayandelger	5152	Halzan		
5143	Dariganga	5153	Erdenetsagaan		
5144	Mönhhaan				
5145	Naran				
5146	Ongon				
5147	Sükhbaatar				
5148	Tüvshinshiree				
5149	Tümentsogt				
52**	Dornogovi aimag				
522	Sainshand city				
5241	Airag	5251	Ulaanbadrakh		
5242	Altanshiree	5252	Khatanbulag		
5243	Dalanjargalan	5253	Khövsgöl		
5244	Delgerekh	5254	Erdene		
5245	Zamyn-Üüd				
5246	Ikhkhet (Zülegt, Khajuu-Ulaan)				
5247	Mandakh				
5248	Örgön				
5249	Saikhandulaan				
53**	Ömnögovi aimag				
532	Dalanzadgad city				
5341	Bayandalai	5351	Khanbogd		
5342	Bayan-Ovoo	5352	Khan khongor		
5343	Bulgan	5353	Khürmen		
5344	Gurvan tes	5354	Tsogt-Ovoo		
5345	Mandal-Ovoo	5355	Tsogttsetsii (Tavan Tolgoi)		
5346	Manlai				
5347	Noyon				
5348	Nomgon				
5349	Sevrei				
54**	Govisümber aimag				
542	Choir city (Sümber sum)				
5441	Bayantal	5442	Shiveegovi		
56**	Khentii aimag				
562	Öndörkhaan city				
5641	Batnorov (Berkh)	5651	Darkhan (Bor-Öndör)		
5642	Batshireet	5652	Delgerkhaan		
5643	Bayan-Adarga	5653	Jargaltkhaan		
5644	Bayanmönkh	5654	Mörön (Chandgana Tal)		
5645	Bayan-Ovoo	5655	Norovlin		
5646	Bayankhutag	5656	Ömnödelger		
5647	Binder	5657	Tsenkhermandal		
5648	Galshar				
5649	Dadal				
58**	Dornod aimag				
582	Choibalsan city				
5841	Bayandun	5851	Khölönbuir		
5842	Bayantümen	5852	Tsagaan-Ovoo		
5843	Bayan-Uul (Ereen)	5853	Choibalsan		
5844	Bulgan	5854	Chuluunkhoroot		
5845	Gurvanzagal				
5846	Dashbalbar (Erdes)				
5847	Matad				
5848	Sergelen				
5849	Khalhgol				
59**	Dundgovi aimag				
592	Mandalgovi city				
5941	Adaatsag	5951	Öndörshil		
5942	Bayanjargalan	5952	Saikhan-Ovoo		
5943	Govi-Ugtaal	5953	Khuld		
5944	Gurvansaikhan	5954	Tsagaandelger		
5945	Delgerkhangai	5955	Erdenedalai		
5946	Delgertsogt				
5947	Deren				
5948	Luus				
5949	Ölziit				
