= Zavkhan =

Zavkhan may refer to:

- Zavkhan Province, Mongolia
- several sums (districts) in different aimags of Mongolia:
  - Zavkhan, Uvs
  - Zavkhanmandal, Zavkhan
- Zavkhan River, a river
