= Tosontsengel, Zavkhan =

District in Zavkhan Province, Mongolia

Tosontsengel District Тосонцэнгэл сум ᠲᠣᠰᠤᠨᠴᠡᠩᠭᠡᠯᠰᠤᠮᠤ
- District
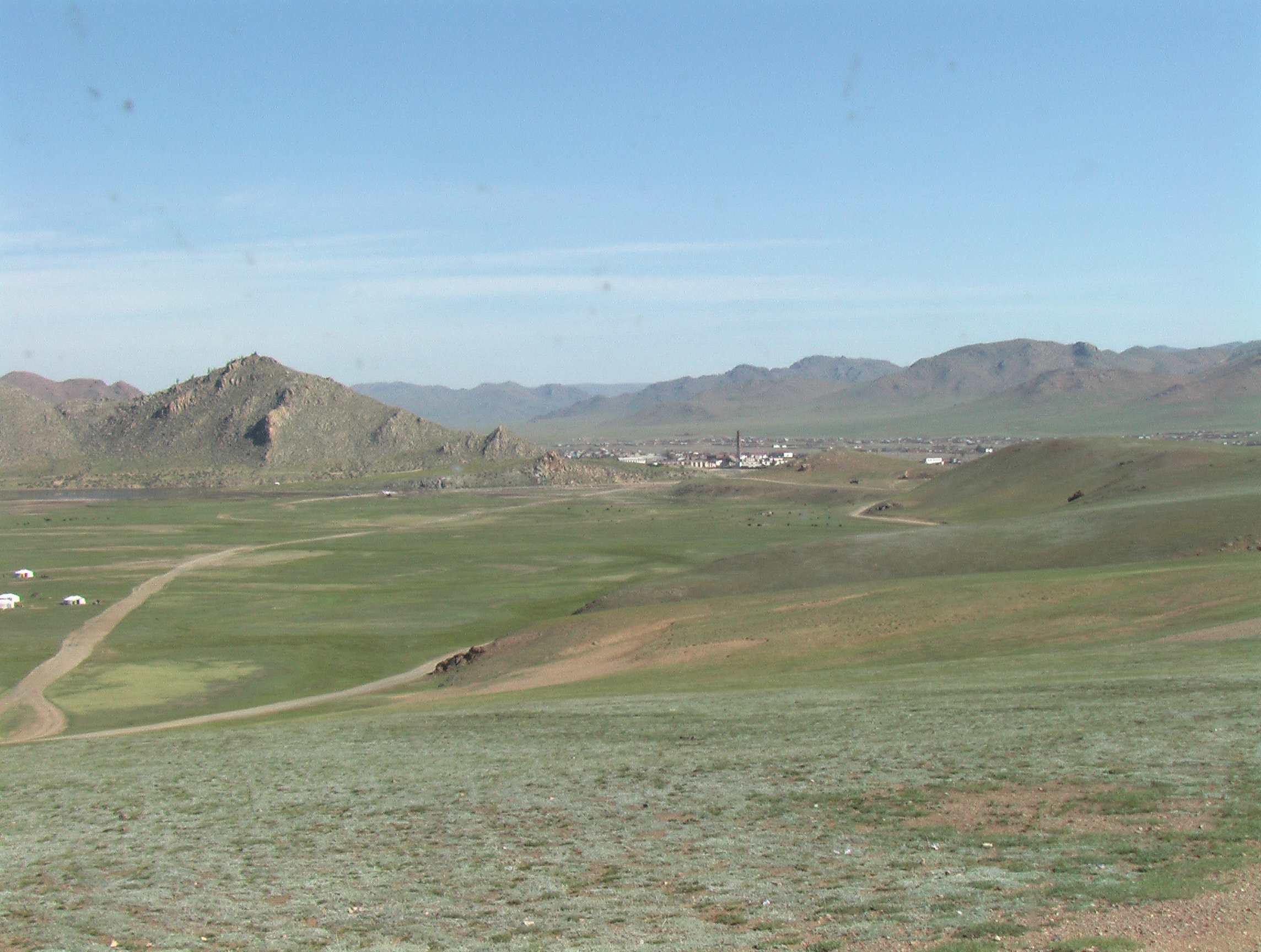
- View of the Tosontsengel sum centre

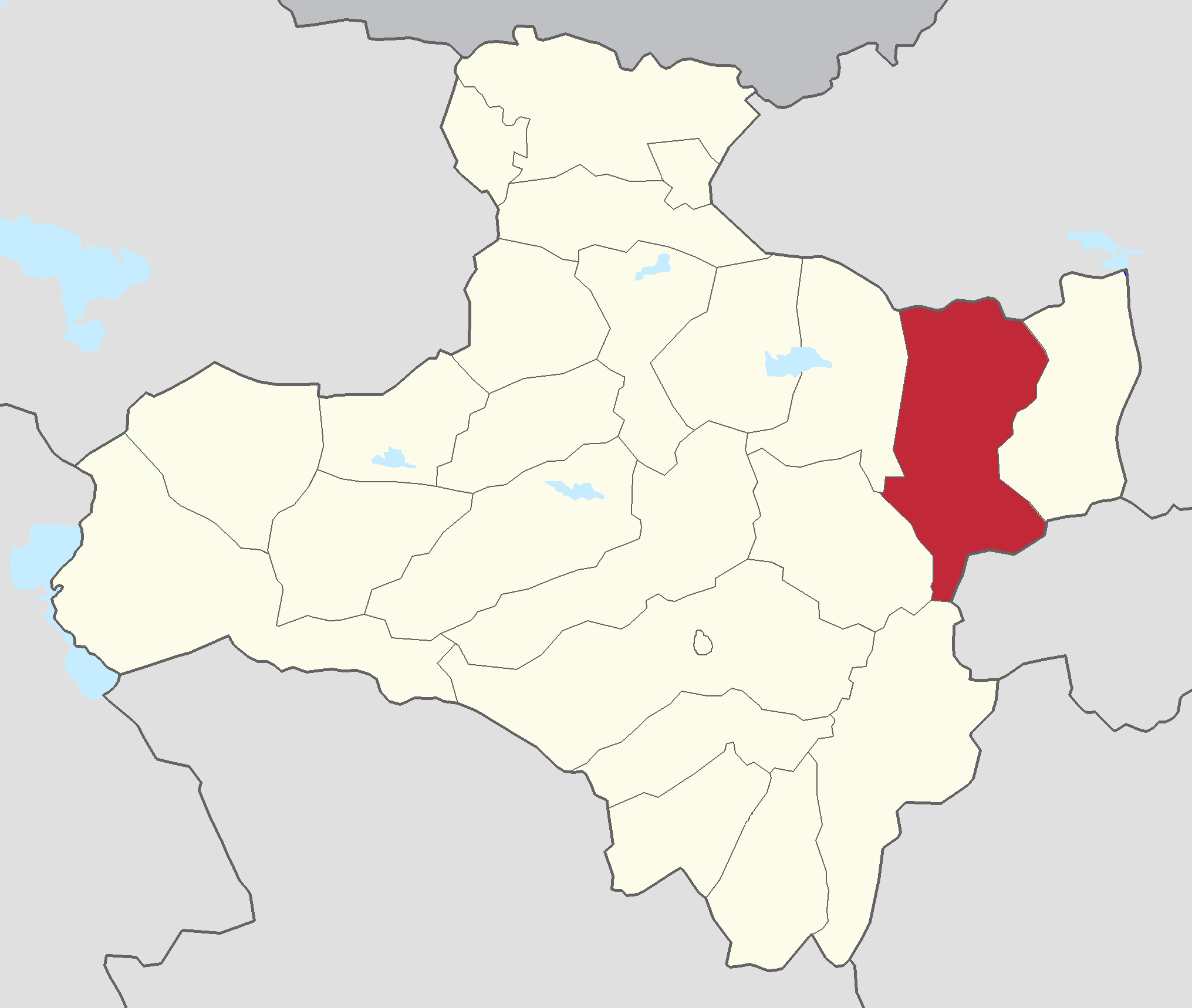

- Location within Mongolia
- Coordinates: 48°45′23″N 98°16′17″E
- Country: Mongolia
- Province: Zavkhan Province
- Elevation: 1,708 m (5,604 ft)
- Time zone: UTC+8 (UTC + 8)
- Climate: Dwc

Tosontsengel (Mongolian: Тосонцэнгэл, meaning 'Oil happiness') is a sum of Zavkhan Province (aimag) in western Mongolia. It is the largest sum and sum centre in Zavkhan aimag after its capital, Uliastai.

== Geography ==
Founded in 1923, Tosontsengel sum is located in the northeastern part of Zavkhan province. It is bordered by Ider, Ikh-Uul, Otgon, and Telmen sums of Zavkhan province; Tsetserleg sum of Khuvsgul province; and Tsakhir sum of Arkhangai province.

The Ider River divides Tosontsengel into two parts. The southern part of the sum is located at the head of the Tarvagatai mountain range, a branch of the Khangai Mountains, which belongs to the forest steppe and steppe zone. The main part of the Khangai Mountains occupies most of the sum.

== Administrative divisions ==
The district is divided into seven bags, which are:

- Bayan-Ulaan
- Darkhan-Uul
- Ider
- Khairkhan
- Orgikh
- Rashaant
- Ulaantolgoi

== Climate ==
Tosontsengel has a subarctic climate (Köppen climate classification Dwc) with mild summers and bitterly cold winters. The average minimum temperature in January is −36.2 °C (−33.2 °F), and temperatures as low as −52.9 °C (−63.2 °F) have been recorded. Most precipitation falls in the summer as rain, with some snow in the adjacent months of May and September. Winters are very dry. The wind causes the snow to drift, making it difficult for the nomadic herders to keep their animals alive.

Climate data for Tosontsengel, elevation 1,713 m (5,620 ft), (1991–2020 normals, extremes 1964–present)
Month	Jan	Feb	Mar	Apr	May	Jun	Jul	Aug	Sep	Oct	Nov	Dec	Year
Record high °C (°F)	−0.8 (30.6)	8.9 (48.0)	13.8 (56.8)	25.6 (78.1)	30.4 (86.7)	33.0 (91.4)	36.0 (96.8)	32.7 (90.9)	28.7 (83.7)	26.0 (78.8)	10.9 (51.6)	4.7 (40.5)	36.0 (96.8)
Mean daily maximum °C (°F)	−24.7 (−12.5)	−18.2 (−0.8)	−5.6 (21.9)	8.3 (46.9)	15.9 (60.6)	21.6 (70.9)	23.1 (73.6)	21.0 (69.8)	15.1 (59.2)	5.5 (41.9)	−9.2 (15.4)	−21.0 (−5.8)	2.7 (36.8)
Daily mean °C (°F)	−31.5 (−24.7)	−26.9 (−16.4)	−14.7 (5.5)	0.6 (33.1)	7.8 (46.0)	13.8 (56.8)	15.8 (60.4)	13.2 (55.8)	6.5 (43.7)	−2.8 (27.0)	−16.1 (3.0)	−27.1 (−16.8)	−5.1 (22.8)
Mean daily minimum °C (°F)	−36.2 (−33.2)	−33.0 (−27.4)	−22.2 (−8.0)	−6.1 (21.0)	−0.1 (31.8)	6.1 (43.0)	9.0 (48.2)	6.4 (43.5)	−0.9 (30.4)	−9.3 (15.3)	−21.5 (−6.7)	−31.8 (−25.2)	−11.6 (11.1)
Record low °C (°F)	−52.9 (−63.2)	−48.9 (−56.0)	−43.5 (−46.3)	−30.0 (−22.0)	−14.3 (6.3)	−5.7 (21.7)	−1.9 (28.6)	−5.2 (22.6)	−14.2 (6.4)	−32.1 (−25.8)	−42.1 (−43.8)	−48.9 (−56.0)	−52.9 (−63.2)
Average precipitation mm (inches)	3 (0.1)	3 (0.1)	4 (0.2)	9 (0.4)	18 (0.7)	38 (1.5)	62 (2.4)	50 (2.0)	24 (0.9)	10 (0.4)	7 (0.3)	6 (0.2)	234 (9.2)
Average precipitation days (≥ 1.0 mm)	1.2	0.7	1.1	1.9	3.3	7.0	10.5	9.0	4.6	3.1	2.0	1.5	45.9
Source 1: Pogoda.ru.net
Source 2: NOAA (1973-1990)

=== Barometric pressure record ===
The highest barometric pressure ever recorded on Earth was 1085.7 millibars (32.06 inHg), measured in Tosontsengel on 19 December 2001. The actual reading was 846.5 millibars or 25.00 inches of mercury, before adjustment to sea level.

== Population ==
The population of Tosontsengel is about 9,000. The population of the sum center is about 920 families (about 5,000 people) in winter and about 680 in summer. There are two schools (elementary through high school), a trade school, and a hospital in the sum center. Outside of the main sum are two large fields owned by a foreigner, Tom Phillips, which provide most of the vegetables for the town.

== Economy ==
In the socialist period Tosontsengel was one of the largest timber processing centres in Mongolia. A new small hydropower station was built on the Ider close to the sum centre.

Most residents are nomadic herders moving between their summer locations, often by a river, to their Uveljus (winter homes) to protect their animals from the harsh Mongolia winter. The people who live in the sum center operate stores, drive trucks, or leave to mine in the summer months. As the nomadic lifestyle becomes more difficult, more young people are leaving the sum for the capital city to attend university and find jobs.

== Transportation ==
Tosontsengel sum has relatively good road connections to Uliastai city (181 kilometres (112 mi)), Mörön city (213 kilometres (132 mi)), Tsetserleg city (361 kilometres (224 mi)), and Ulaangom city (573 kilometres (356 mi)); and to the Russian border crossing (307 kilometres (191 mi)) and the Russian cities Kyzyl (Tyva respublic) and Krasnoyarsk (Krasnoyarsk Krai).

There is a small airport called Tosontsengel Airport in the sum centre. It is located on the right bank of the Ider. The airport has not been used often since 2007, with the main users being a medical airplane flown by Blue Sky and the annual crop duster plane that has been combatting the moths that are destroying the forests.

== Infrastructure ==
- Toson Thermal Power Plant
