= Chuluu =

Chuluu (Mongolian: Чулуу, stone; inflexions Chuluut or Chuluun) is a common Mongolian geographical name, specifying:

- The Chuluut River.
- several sums (districts) in different Mongolian aimags (provinces):
  - Chuluut, Arkhangai
  - Chuluunkhoroot, Dornod
  - Tsagaanchuluut, Zavkhan
