= Toson Thermal Power Plant =

Coal-fired power plant in Tosontsengel, Zavkhan, Mongolia

- Official name: Тосон Цахилгаан Станц
- Country: Mongolia
- Location: Tosontsengel, Zavkhan
- Coordinates: 48°45′17.1″N 98°14′46.1″E
- Status: Operational
- Commission date: January 2025
- Owner: Gem International LLC

Thermal power station
- Primary fuel: Coal
- Turbine technology: Steam turbine

Power generation
- Nameplate capacity: 24 MW

External links
- Website: Official website (in Mongolian)

The Toson Thermal Power Plant (Mongolian: Тосон Цахилгаан Станц) is a coal-fired power station in Tosontsengel District, Zavkhan Province, Mongolia. It is the first privately owned power station in the country.

== History ==
The power station was commissioned in January 2025, making it the first privately owned power station in Mongolia.

== Technical specifications ==
The power station has an installed capacity of 24 MW. It produces both heat and electricity.

== Management ==
The power station is owned by Gem International LLC.

== See also ==
- List of power stations in Mongolia
