= Yaruu, Zavkhan =

District in Zavkhan Province, Mongolia

Coordinates: 48°06′53″N 96°45′51″E

Yaruu District Яруу сум ᠢᠷᠠᠭᠤᠰᠤᠮᠤ
- District
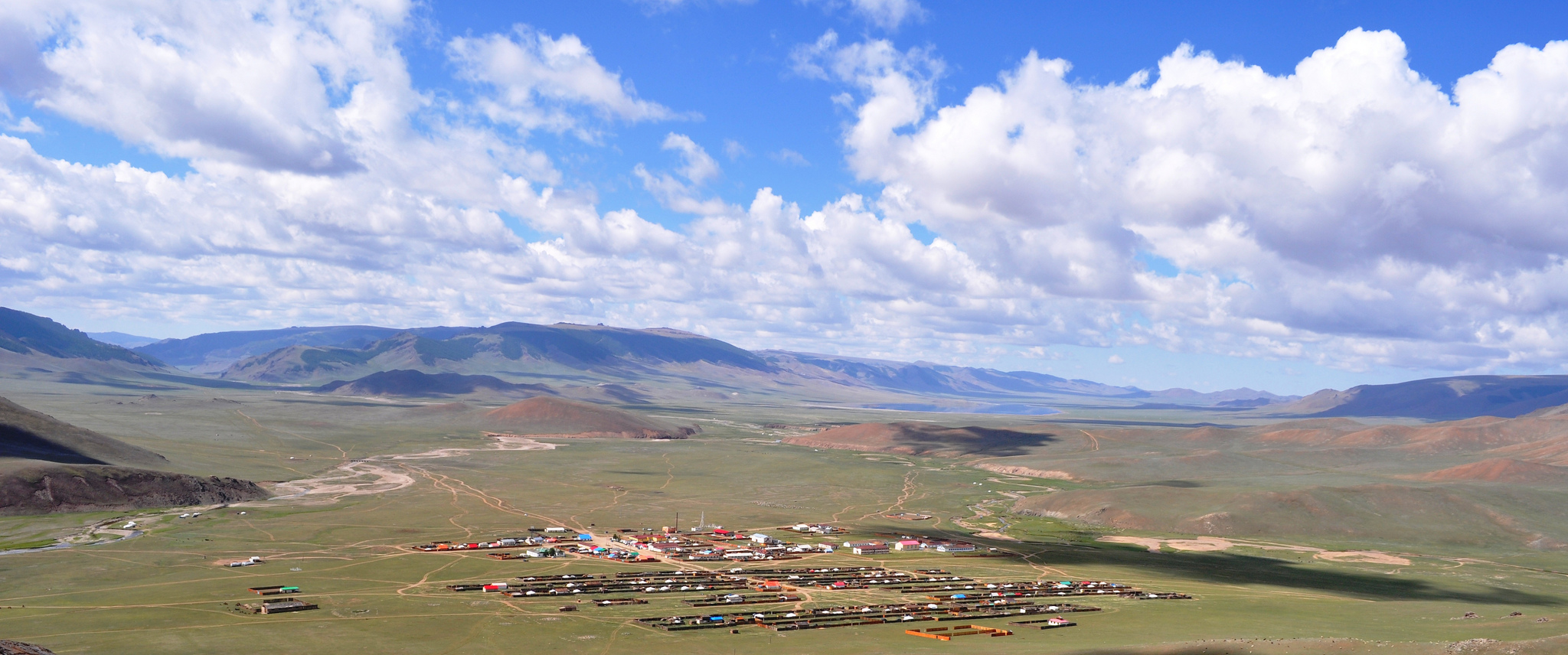

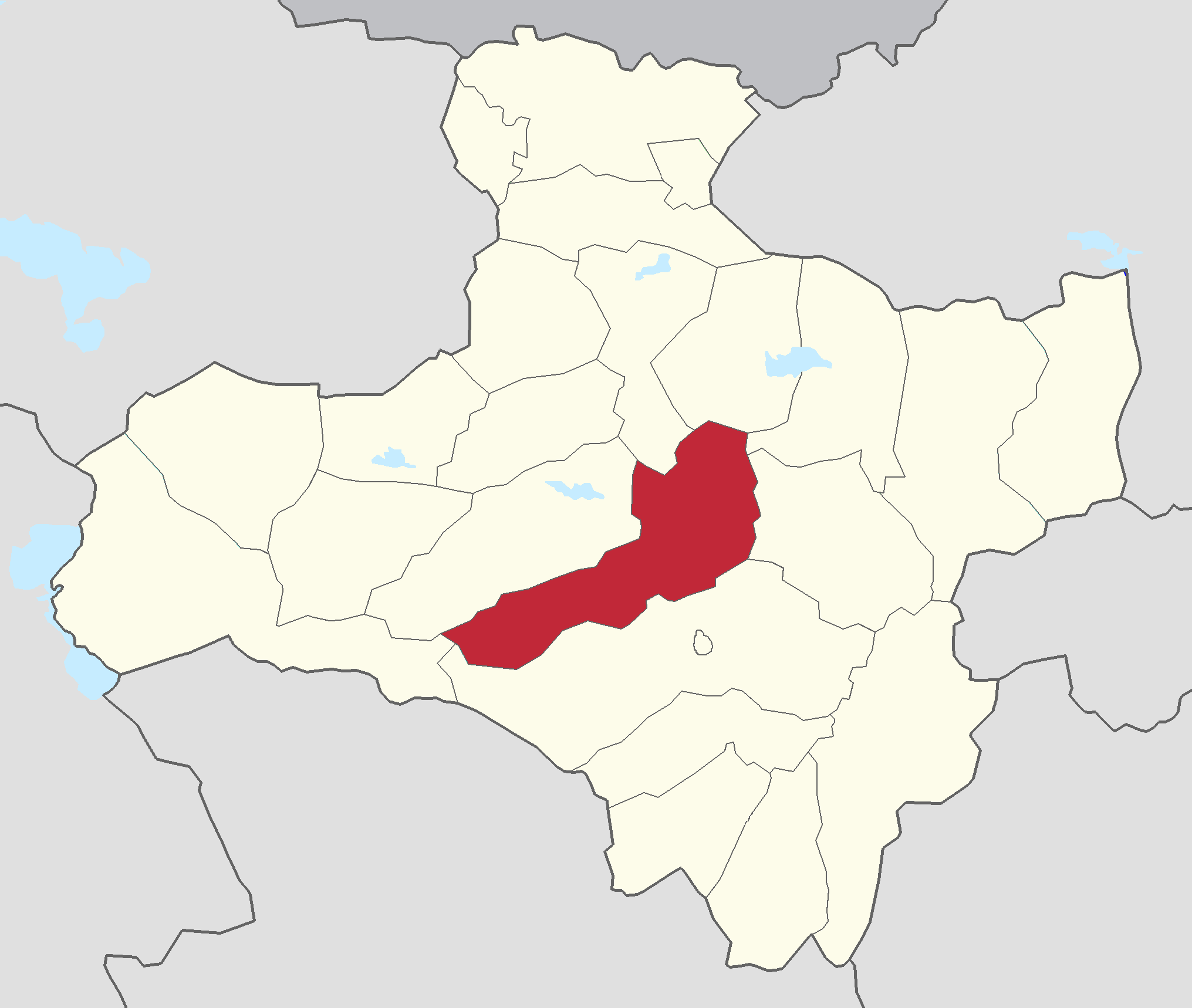
- Country: Mongolia
- Province: Zavkhan Province
- Time zone: UTC+8 (UTC + 8)
- Climate: Dwc

Yaruu (Mongolian: Яруу) is a sum of Zavkhan Province in western Mongolia. An unpaved road connects Yaruu sum centre to Zavkhanmandal sum. In 2005, its population was 2,547.

== Administrative divisions ==
The district is divided into five bags, which are:

- Chandmani
- Jargalant
- Khets-Ulaan
- Urgun
- Zuil

== Notable natives ==
- Natsagiin Bagabandi, president of Mongolia
