= Otgontenger =

Highest peak in the Khangai Mountains of Mongolia

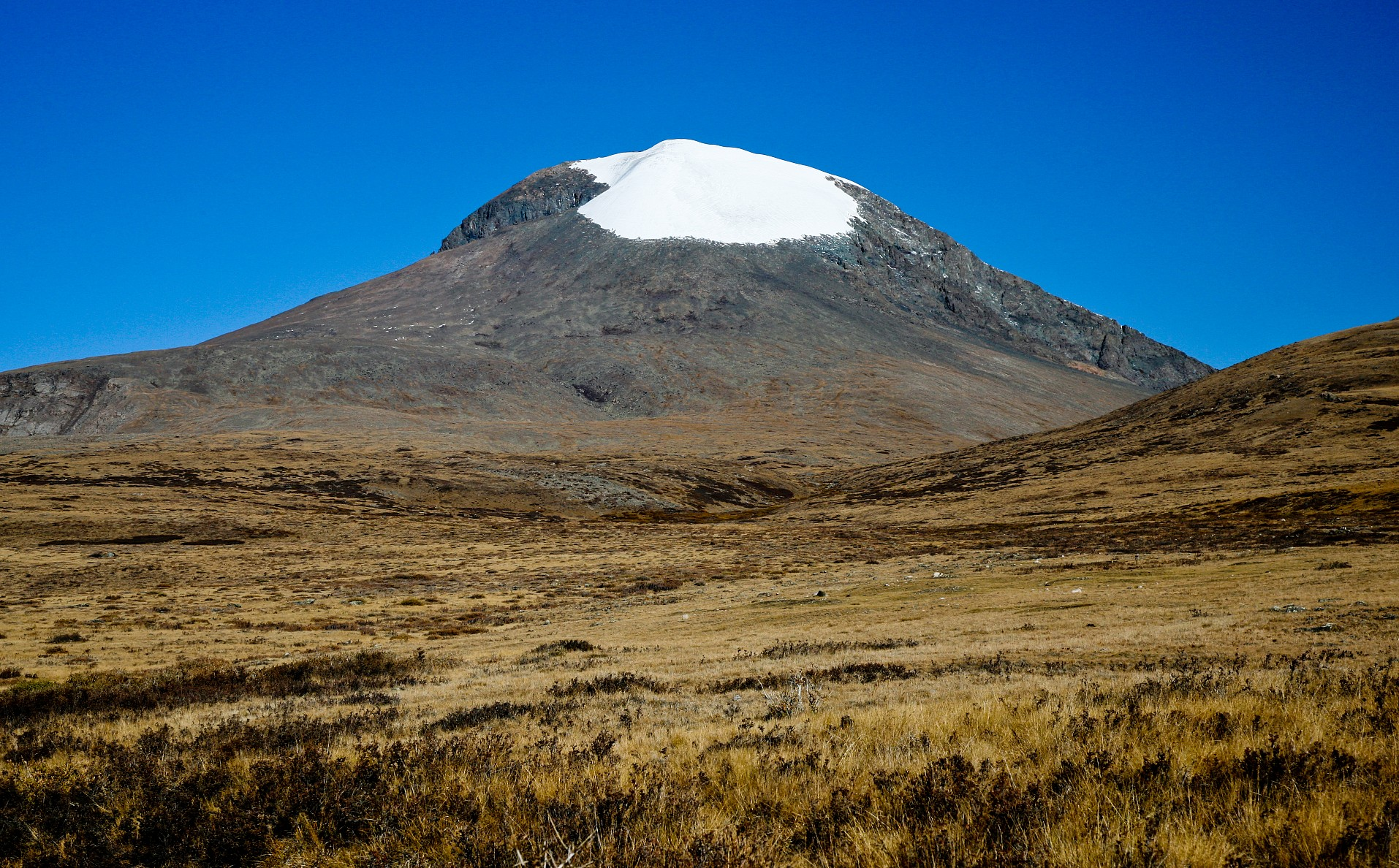
- Otgontenger in September 2009

Highest point
- Elevation: 4,010 m (13,160 ft)
- Prominence: 2,269 m (7,444 ft)
- Listing: Ultra, Ribu
- Coordinates: 47°36′30″N 97°33′9″E

Geography
- Location within Mongolia
- Location: Otgon, Zavkhan, Mongolia
- Parent range: Khangai Mountains

Otgontenger (/ˌɒtɡɒnˈtɛŋɡər/; Mongolian: Отгонтэнгэр [ˈɔʰtχɞɴtʰɪŋɡɪ̆r]; lit. 'the youngest sky') is the highest peak in the Khangai Mountains of Mongolia. Its summit is calculated to reach an elevation of 4,021 meters above mean sea level. The mountain is located in Zavkhan Province and is the only peak in the Khangai range that is capped with a permanent glacier.

== History ==
Mongols have worshipped Otgontenger since ancient times. In 1779, the mountain's state-led worship was revived but later forgotten. In 1911, under Bogd Khan's rule, annual Buddhist ceremonies were reinstated. However, these practices were again discontinued over time due to the Mongolian People's Republic's anti-religious policies. In 1992, the State Great Khural declared the Otgontenger area a Strictly Protected Zone to preserve its natural and spiritual significance. In 1995, the president of Mongolia, Punsalmaagiin Ochirbat, who was born in Zavkhan Province, issued a decree officially restoring Otgontenger's status as a state-sanctioned sacred mountain, mandating that state rituals be held every four years.

Climbing Otgontenger has been banned since 2015, for environmental protection.

=== Incidents ===
On 4 August 1963, MIAT Mongolian Airlines Avia 14 Super MONGOL-105 struck the side of Otgontenger, killing at least two people. According to a Mongolian journalist, the aircraft had departed Buyant-Ukhaa International Airport for Uvs and Khovd with more than 40 people on board. In 2005, the wreckage, which was still in good condition, was removed from the mountain and dragged and slid into a nearby canyon.

In October 2017, 27 hikers climbed the mountain despite the ban and a call from the inspector for environmental protection of Zavkhan Province, and after being hit by an avalanche, only ten returned. Deputy Prime Minister Ölziisaikhany Enkhtüvshin led a search and rescue operation involving over 200 people and two helicopters. All remaining 17 climbers were found dead.

== See also ==
- List of mountains in Mongolia
- List of ultras of Central Asia
