= Dörvöljin, Zavkhan =

District in Zavkhan Province, Mongolia

Coordinates: 47°38′55″N 95°00′01″E

Dörvöljin District Дөрвөлжин сум ᠳᠥᠷᠪᠡᠯᠵᠢᠨᠰᠤᠮᠤ
- District
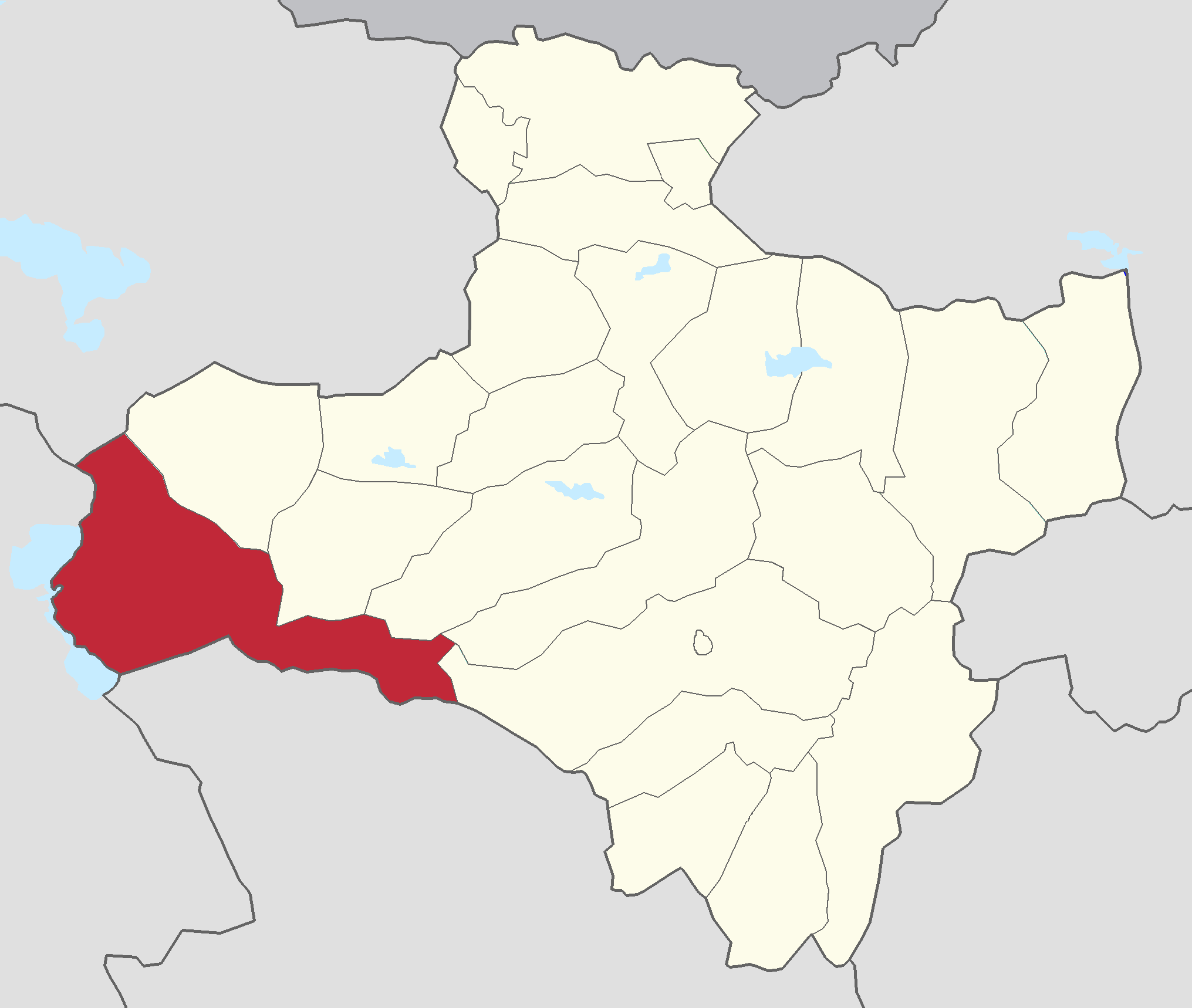
- Country: Mongolia
- Province: Zavkhan Province
- Time zone: UTC+8 (UTC + 8)
- Climate: BWk

Dörvöljin (Mongolian: Дөрвөлжин, Square) is a sum of Zavkhan Province in western Mongolia. In 2005, its population was 2,323.

== Geography ==
Dörvöljin is the western most district in Zavkhan Province.

== Administrative divisions ==
The district is divided into five bags, which are:

- Buga
- Buural
- Onts
- Tavantolgoi
- Tsogt
