= Asgat, Zavkhan =

District in Zavkhan Province, Mongolia

Coordinates: 49°24′26″N 96°36′32″E

Asgat District Асгат сум ᠠᠰᠠᠭᠲᠤᠰᠤᠮᠤ
- District
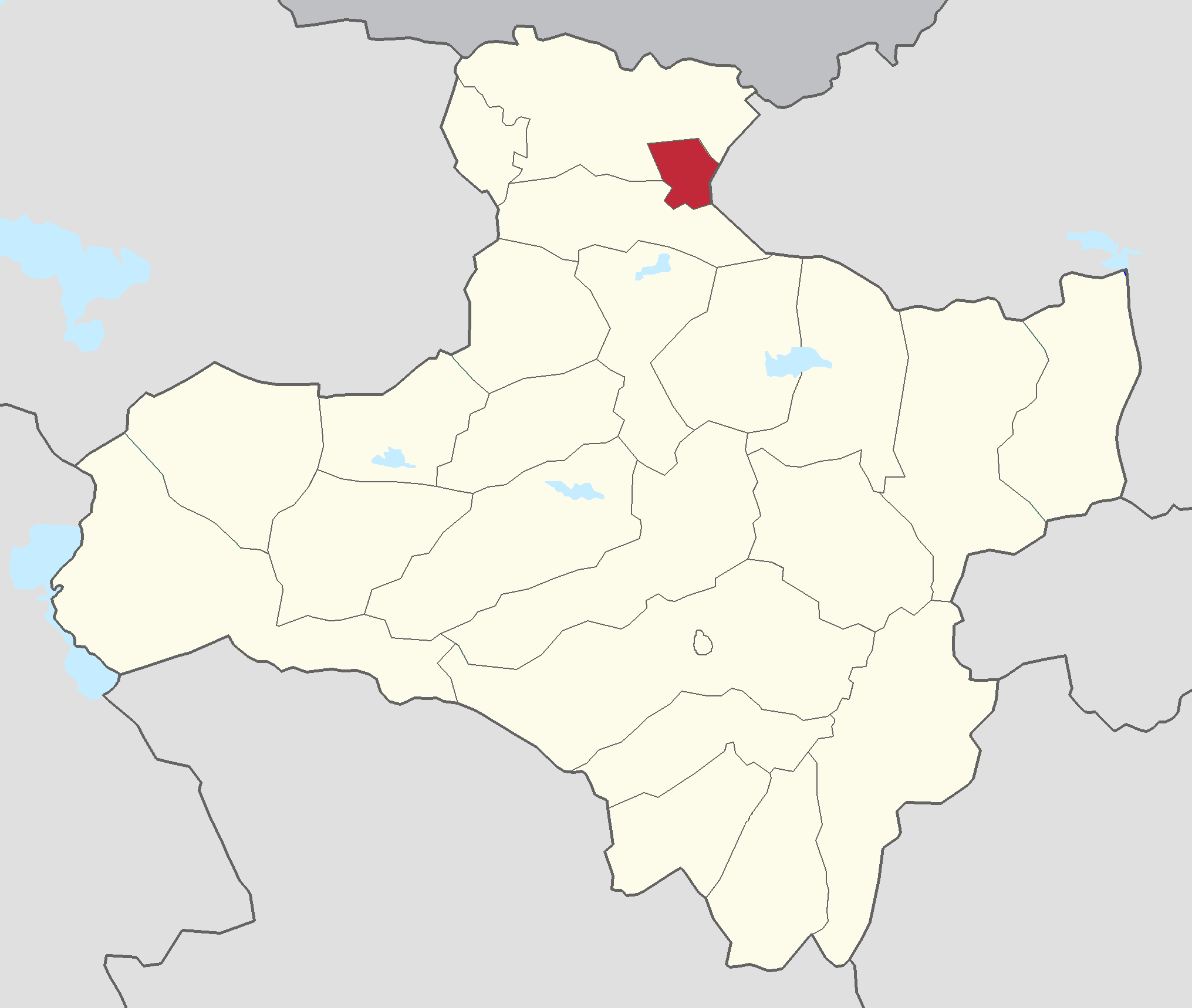
- Country: Mongolia
- Province: Zavkhan Province

Area
  - Total: 600 km^{2} (230 sq mi)

Population
  - Total: 913
- Time zone: UTC+8 (UTC + 8)
- Climate: Dwc

Asgat (Mongolian: Асгат "Rocky Area") is a sum of Zavkhan Province in western Mongolia. In 2005, its population was 1,125.

== Geography ==
The district has a total area of 600 km^{2}.

== Administrative divisions ==
The district is divided into three bags, which are:

- Argalant
- Khairkhan
- Suvarga

== Demographics ==
The district has a population of 913 people.
