= Tsagaankhairkhan, Zavkhan =

District in Zavkhan Province, Mongolia

Coordinates: 47°29′48″N 96°48′07″E

Tsagaankhairkhan District Цагаанхайрхан сум ᠴᠠᠭᠠᠨᠬᠠᠢᠢᠷᠬᠠᠨᠰᠤᠮᠤ
- District
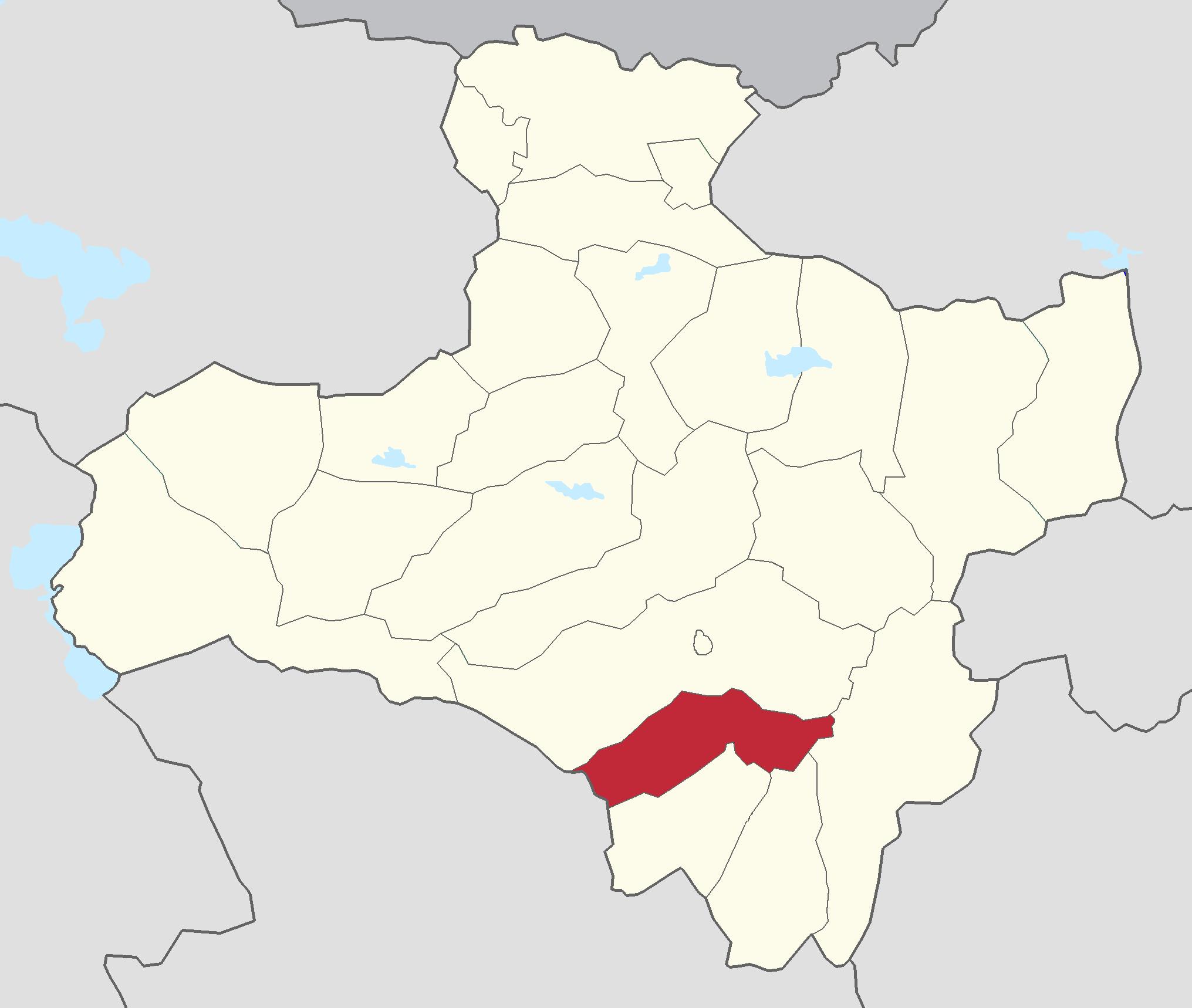
- Country: Mongolia
- Province: Zavkhan Province
- Time zone: UTC+8 (UTC + 8)
- Climate: BSk

Tsagaankhairkhan (Mongolian: Цагаанхайрхан, White mountain) is a sum of Zavkhan Province in western Mongolia. In 2005, its population was 1,823.

== Administrative divisions ==
The district is divided into four bags, which are:

- Agit
- Bayanbulag
- Onts
- Tsetserleg
