= Ider, Zavkhan =

District in Zavkhan Province, Mongolia

Coordinates: 48°13′13″N 97°22′40″E

Ider District Идэр сум ᠢᠳᠡᠷᠰᠤᠮᠤ
- District
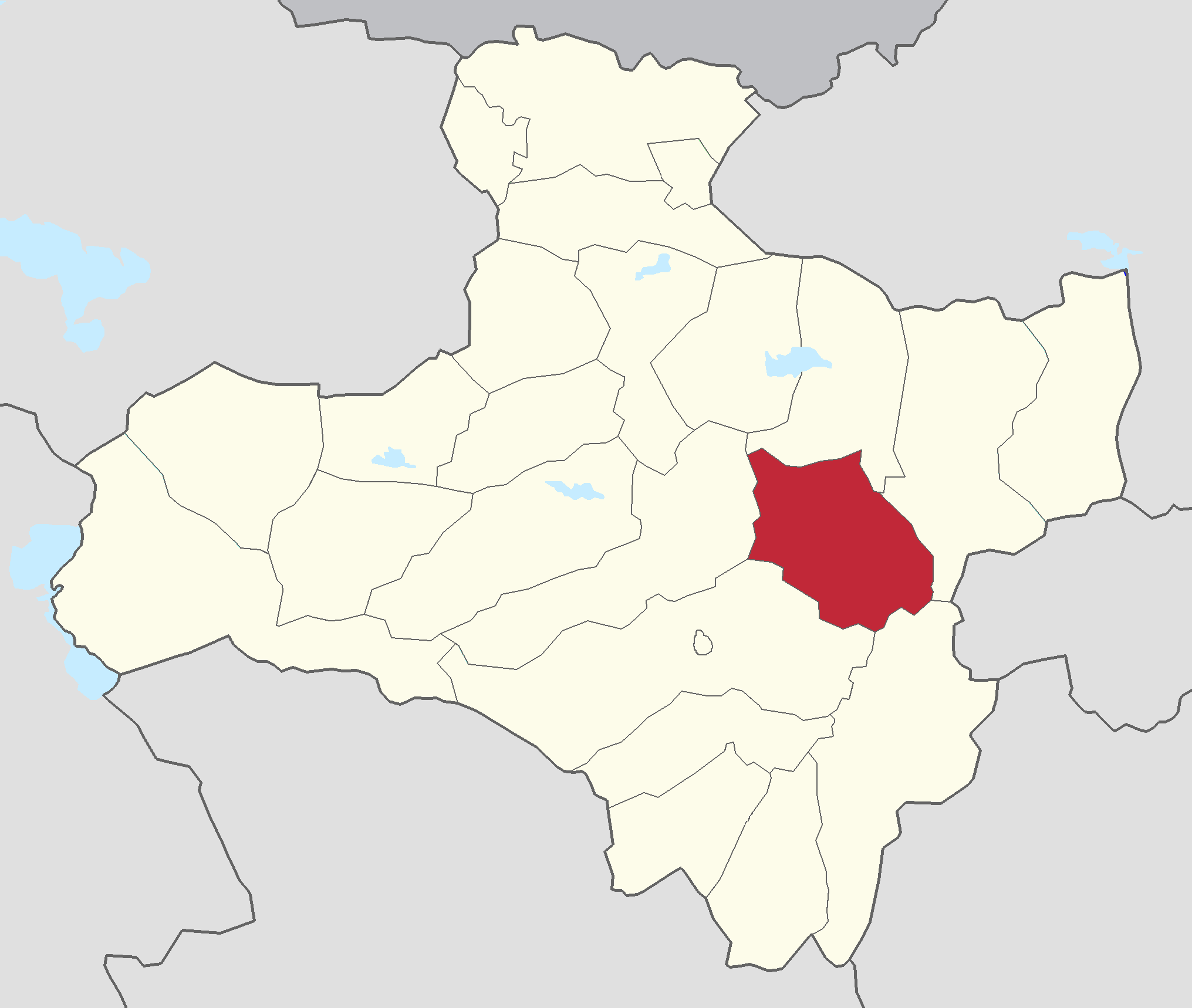
- Country: Mongolia
- Province: Zavkhan Province
- Time zone: UTC+8 (UTC + 8)
- Climate: Dwc

Ider (Mongolian: Идэр) is a sum of Zavkhan Province in western Mongolia. In 2005, its population was 2,714.

== Administrative divisions ==
The district is divided into four bags, which are:

- Darkhan-Uul
- Manuustai
- Tsetserleg
- Zagastai
