= Bayantes, Zavkhan =

District in Zavkhan Province, Mongolia

Coordinates: 49°42′05″N 96°21′39″E

Bayantes District Баянтэс сум ᠪᠠᠶᠠᠨ ᠲᠡᠰᠰᠤᠮᠤ
- District
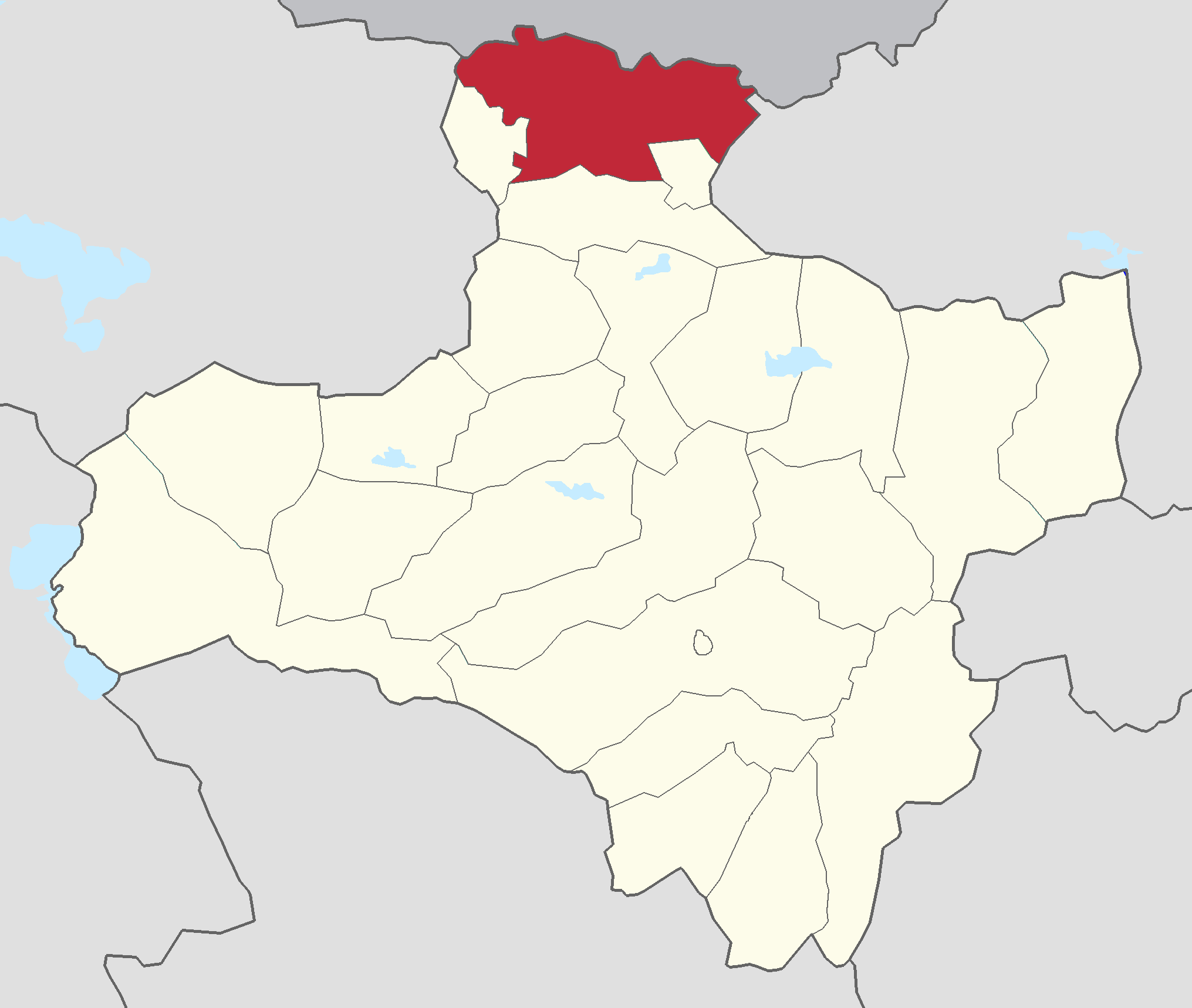
- Country: Mongolia
- Province: Zavkhan Province
- Time zone: UTC+8 (UTC + 8)
- Climate: Dwc

Bayantes (Mongolian: Баянтэс = Rich over Tes river) is a sum of Zavkhan Province in western Mongolia. In 2005, its population was 3,024.

== Geography ==
Bayantes is the northern most district in Zavkhan Province.

== Administrative divisions ==
The district is divided into four bags, which are:

- Bujir
- Javkhlan
- Khachig
- Zaigal
