= Urgamal, Zavkhan =

District in Zavkhan Province, Mongolia

Coordinates: 48°30′55″N 94°17′38″E

Urgamal District Ургамал сум ᠤᠷᠭᠤᠮᠠᠯᠰᠤᠮᠤ
- District
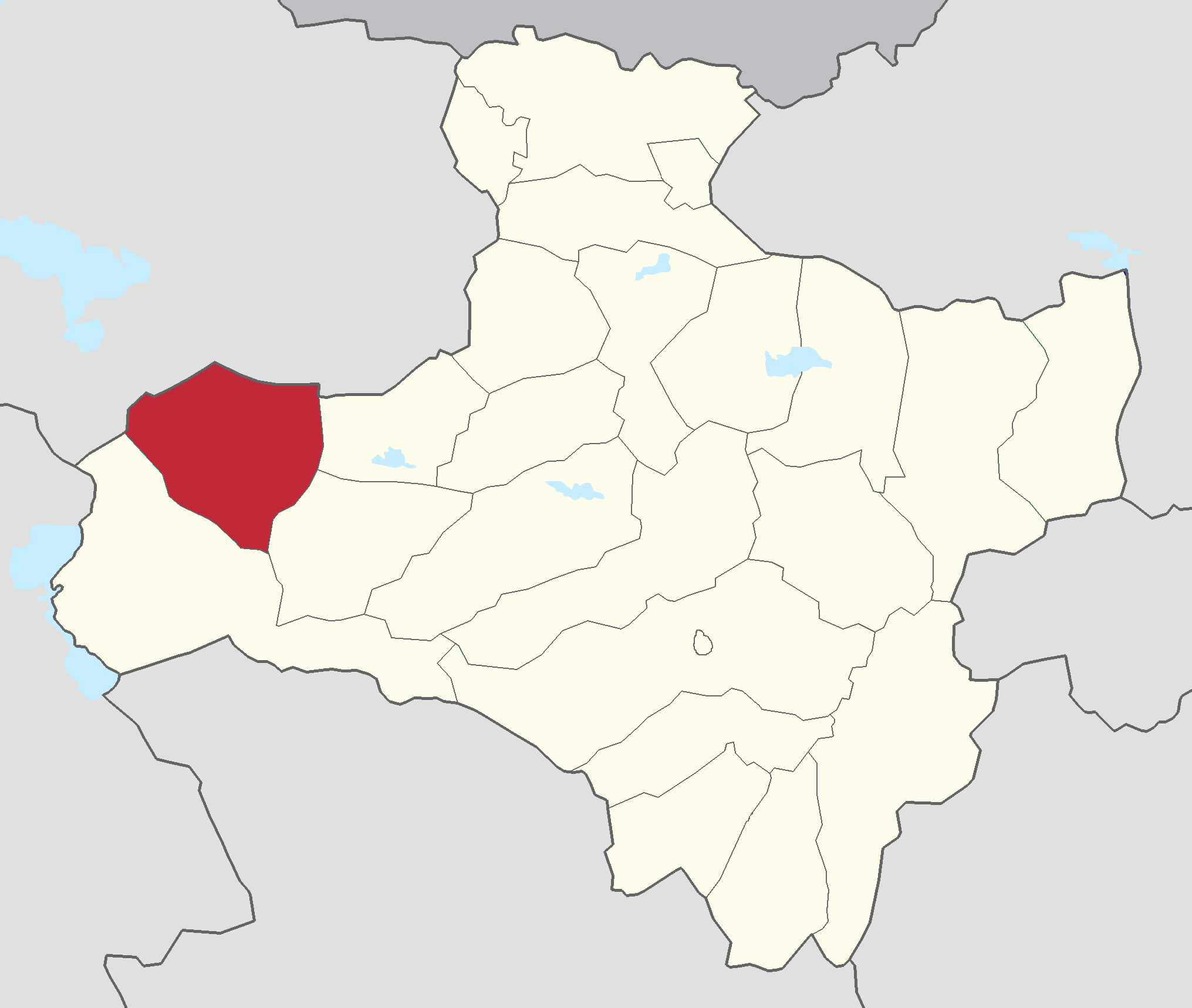
- Country: Mongolia
- Province: Zavkhan Province
- Time zone: UTC+8 (UTC + 8)
- Climate: BWk

Urgamal (Mongolian: Ургамал, Plant/grow) is a sum (district) of Zavkhan Province in western Mongolia. In 2005, its population was 1,822.

== Administrative divisions ==
The district is divided into five bags, which are:

- Bayan-Ulaan
- Khulij
- Khungii
- Nuur zuukhii
- Tosguur
