= Songino, Zavkhan =

District in Zavkhan Province, Mongolia

Coordinates: 49°01′17″N 95°55′45″E

Songino District Сонгино сум ᠰᠣᠩᠭᠢᠨ᠎ᠠᠰᠤᠮᠤ
- District
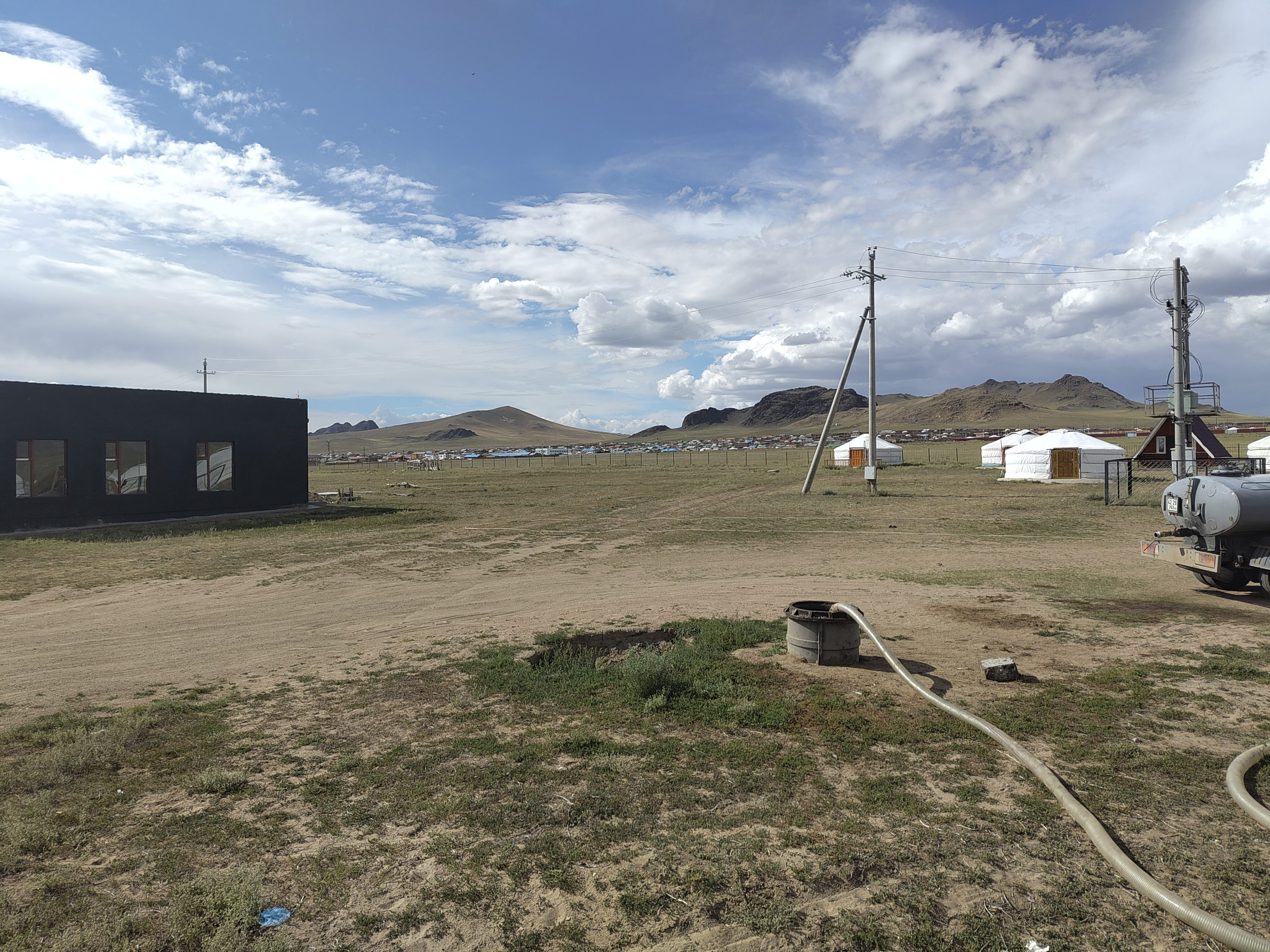

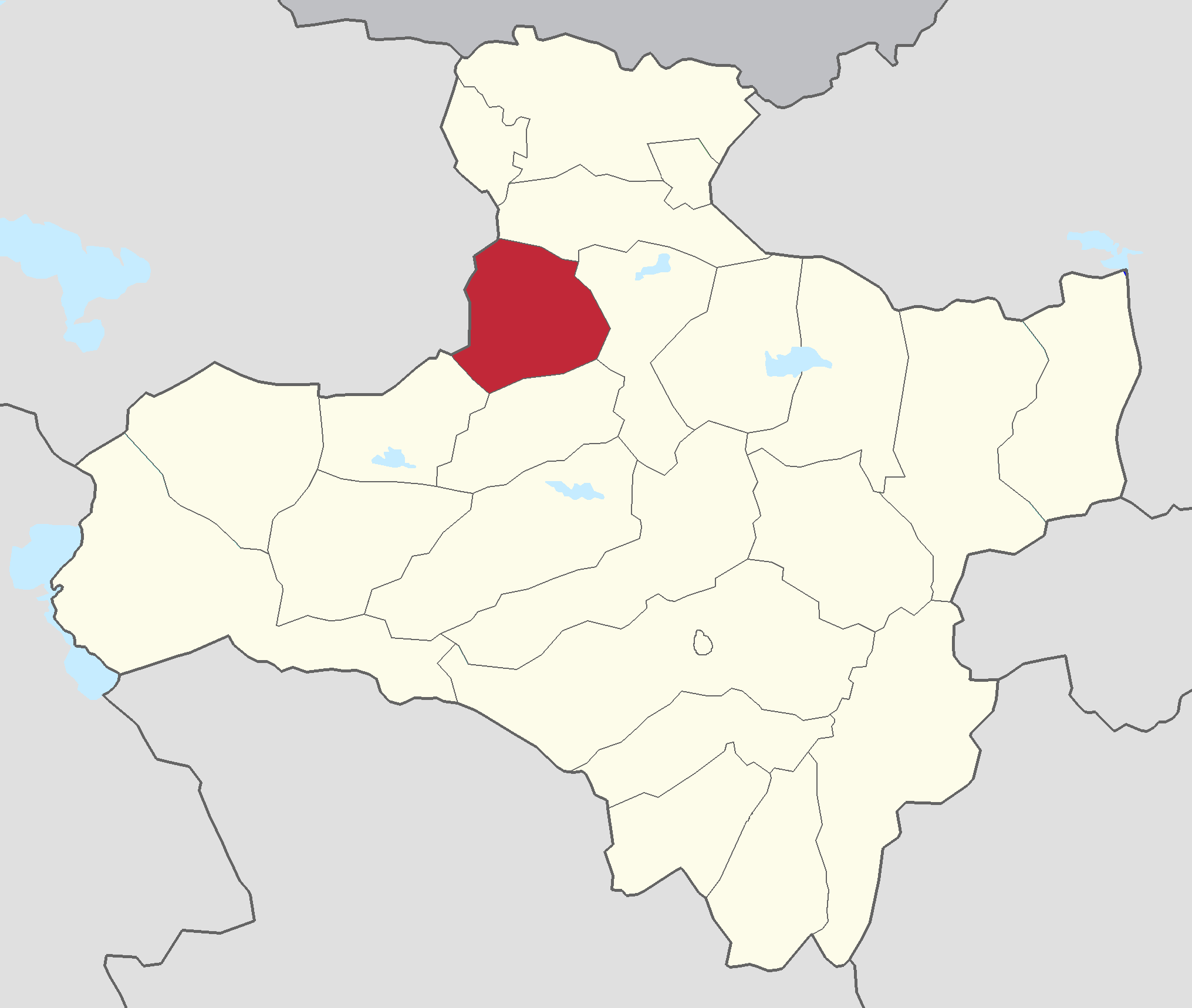
- Country: Mongolia
- Province: Zavkhan Province
- Time zone: UTC+8 (UTC + 8)
- Climate: Dwc

Songino (Mongolian: Сонгино, Onion) is a sum of Zavkhan Province in western Mongolia. The sum center former location was 48 53 10 N 95 52 34 E. In 2005, its population was 1,921.

== Administrative divisions ==
The district is divided into five bags, which are:

- Airag nuur
- Bayan-Airag
- Bor-Undur
- Shar nuruu
- Tariat
