= Tsetsen-Uul, Zavkhan =

District in Zavkhan Province, Mongolia

Coordinates: 48°45′02″N 95°59′59″E

Tsetsen-Uul District Цэцэн-Уул сум ᠴᠡᠴᠡᠨᠠᠭᠤᠯᠠᠰᠤᠮᠤ
- District
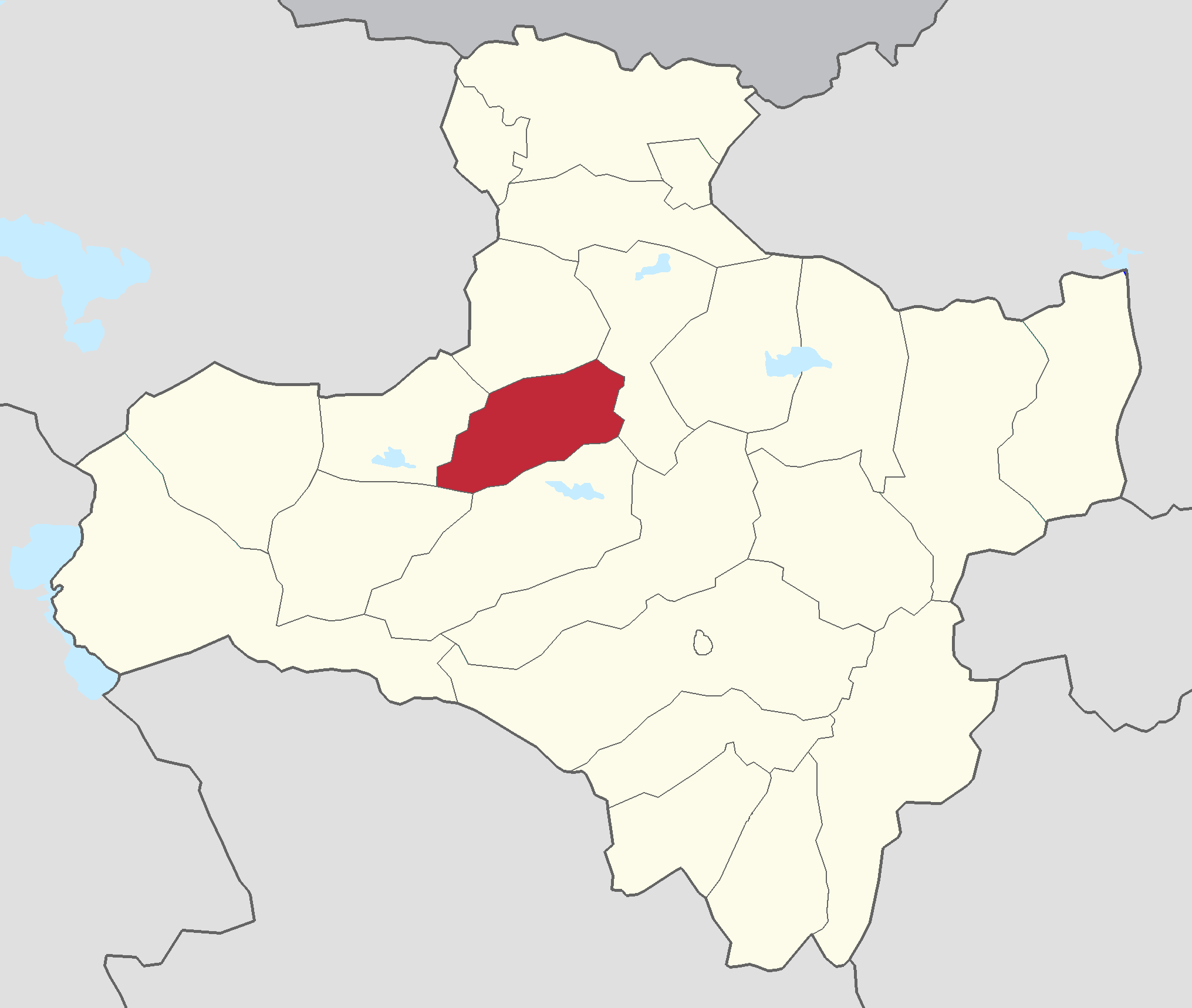
- Country: Mongolia
- Province: Zavkhan Province
- Time zone: UTC+8 (UTC + 8)
- Climate: Dwc

Tsetsen-Uul (Mongolian: Цэцэн-Уул "Wise Mountain") is a sum of Zavkhan Province in western Mongolia. In 2008, its population was 2,114.

On January 21, 2016 at 15:00 UTC, the place recorded the world's highest sea-level pressure of 1,094.7 hectopascals or 32.33 inches of mercury, which was the origin of the January 2016 East Asia cold wave that brought the coldest weather in decades to many Chinese, Taiwanese and Thai cities.

== Administrative divisions ==
The district is divided into five bags, which are:

- Batsuuri
- Jargalant
- Oroin tovgor
- Sangiin dalai
- Shotoi
