= Shilüüstei, Zavkhan =

District in Zavkhan Province, Mongolia

Coordinates: 46°48′00″N 97°11′51″E

Shilüüstei District Шилүүстэй сум ᠰᠢᠯᠢᠭᠦᠰᠦᠲᠡᠢᠰᠤᠮᠤ
- District
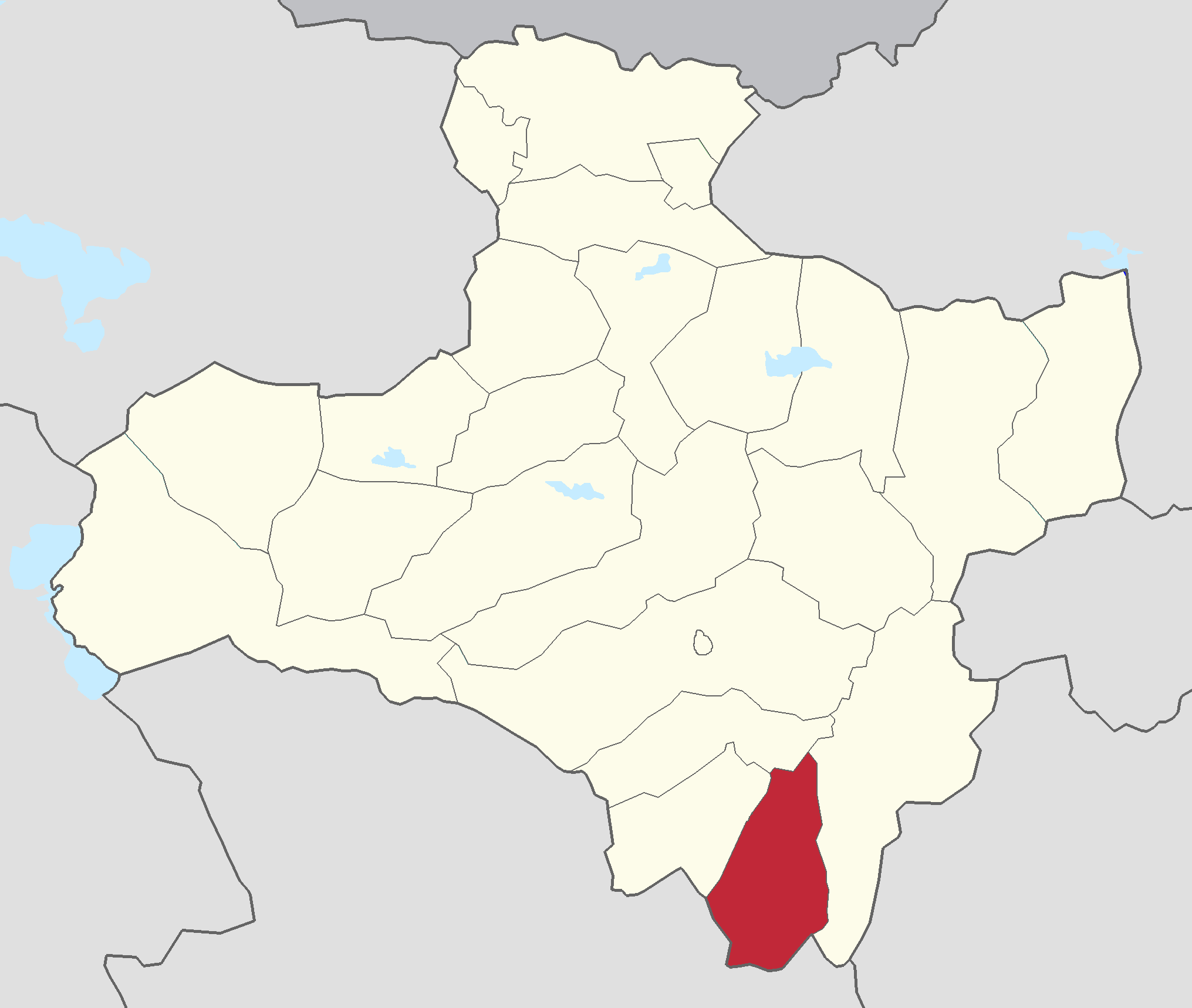
- Country: Mongolia
- Province: Zavkhan Province
- Time zone: UTC+8 (UTC + 8)
- Climate: BSk

Shilüüstei (Mongolian: Шилүүстэй) is a sum of Zavkhan Province in western Mongolia. In 2005, its population was 2,450.

== Administrative divisions ==
The district is divided into four bags, which are:

- Bayan-Ulaan
- Chandmani
- Khugjil
- Saikhan
