= Tes, Zavkhan =

District in Zavkhan Province, Mongolia

Coordinates: 49°39′26″N 95°47′38″E

Tes District Тэс сум ᠲᠡᠰᠰᠤᠮᠤ
- District
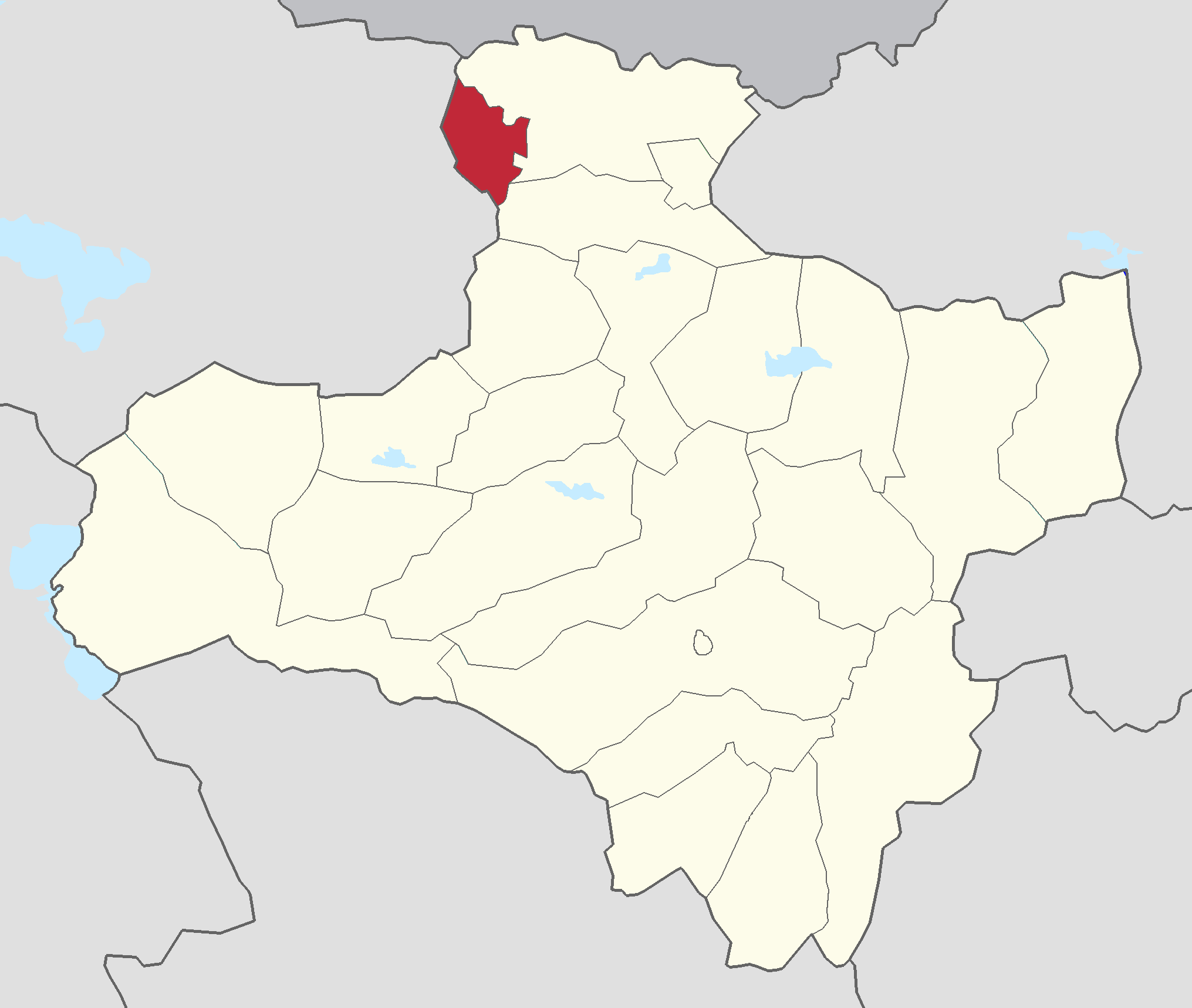
- Country: Mongolia
- Province: Zavkhan Province
- Time zone: UTC+8 (UTC + 8)
- Climate: Dwc

Tes (Mongolian: Тэс) is a sum of Zavkhan Province in western Mongolia. In 2005, its population was 3,230.

== Administrative divisions ==
The district is divided into four bags, which are:

- Bayan-Uul
- Doono
- Niseg
- Zur
