= Bayankhairkhan, Zavkhan =

District in Zavkhan Province, Mongolia

Coordinates: 49°18′27″N 96°20′31″E

Bayankhairkhan District Баянхайрхан сум ᠪᠠᠶᠠᠨᠬᠠᠢᠢᠷᠬᠠᠨᠰᠤᠮᠤ
- District
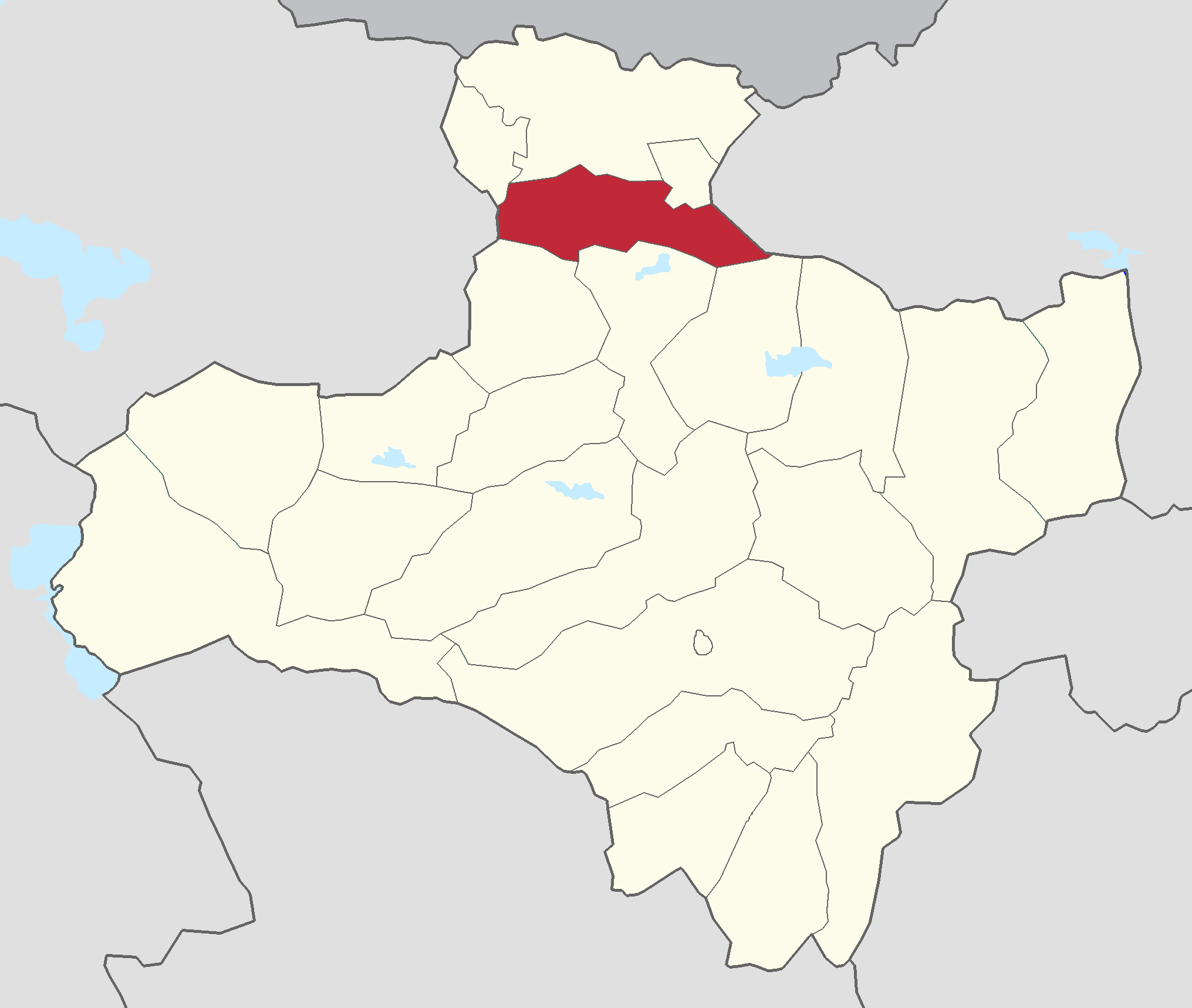
- Country: Mongolia
- Province: Zavkhan Province
- Time zone: UTC+8 (UTC + 8)
- Climate: Dwc

Bayankhairkhan (Mongolian: Баянхайрхан, Rich mountain) is a sum of Zavkhan Province in western Mongolia. In 2005, its population was 1,968.

== Administrative divisions ==
The district is divided into four bags, which are:

- Asgat
- Minj
- Naran
- Tuunt
