= Telmen, Zavkhan =

District in Zavkhan Province, Mongolia

Coordinates: 48°38′33″N 97°36′43″E

Telmen District Тэлмэн сум ᠲᠡᠯᠡᠮᠡᠨ ᠰᠤᠮᠤ
- District
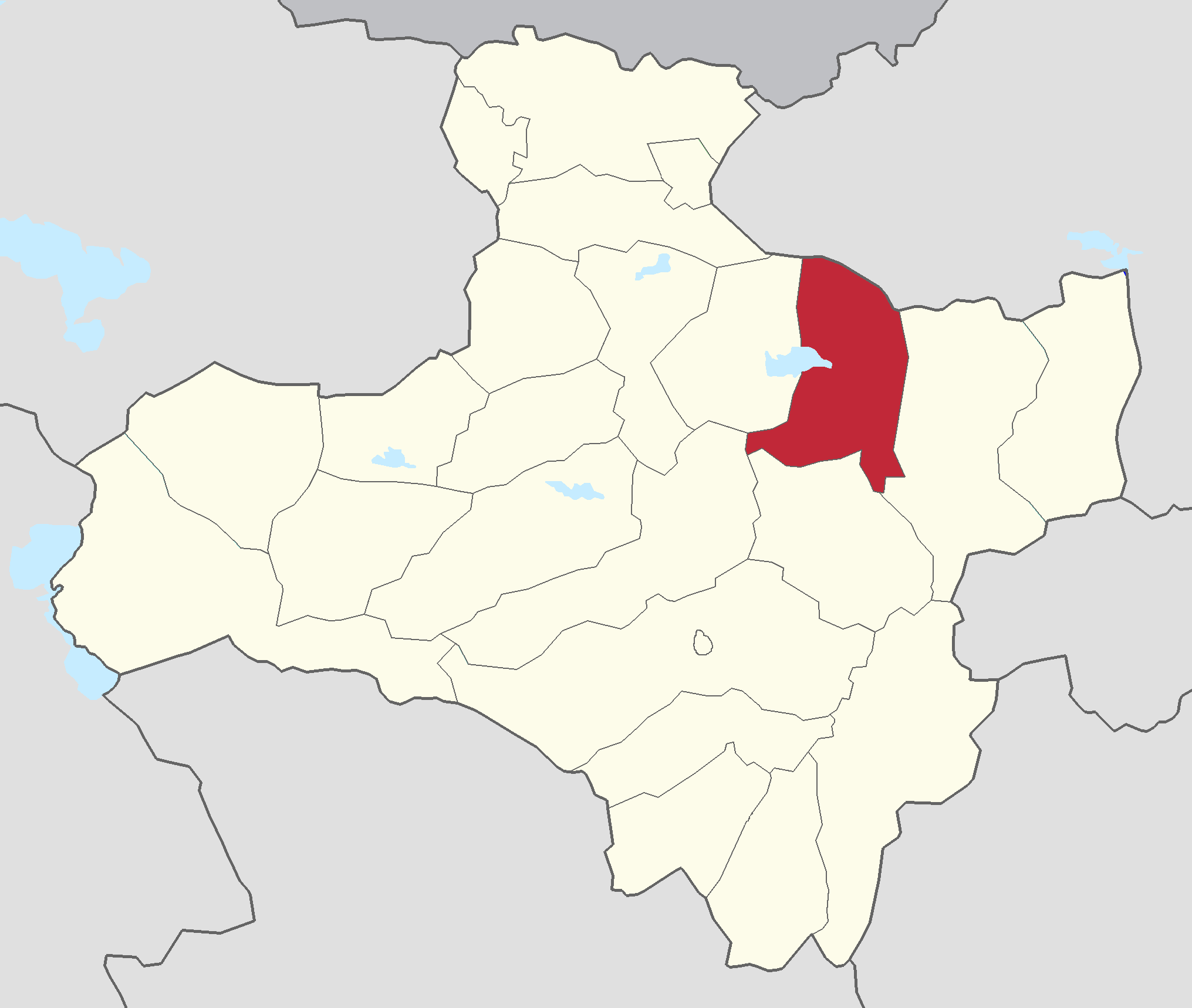
- Country: Mongolia
- Province: Zavkhan Province
- Time zone: UTC+8 (UTC + 8)
- Climate: Dwc

Telmen (Mongolian: Тэлмэн) is a sum of Zavkhan Province in western Mongolia. In 2005, its population was 2,820.

== Geology ==
- Telmen Lake

== Administrative divisions ==
The district is divided into six bags, which are:

- Bayan-Airag
- Bayantegsh
- Nuur
- Shurgakh
- Uguumur
- Uvugdii
