= Ikh-Uul, Zavkhan =

District in Zavkhan Province, Mongolia

Coordinates: 48°43′02″N 98°47′52″E

Ikh-Uul District Их-Уул сум ᠶᠡᠬᠡᠠᠭᠤᠯᠠᠰᠤᠮᠤ
- District
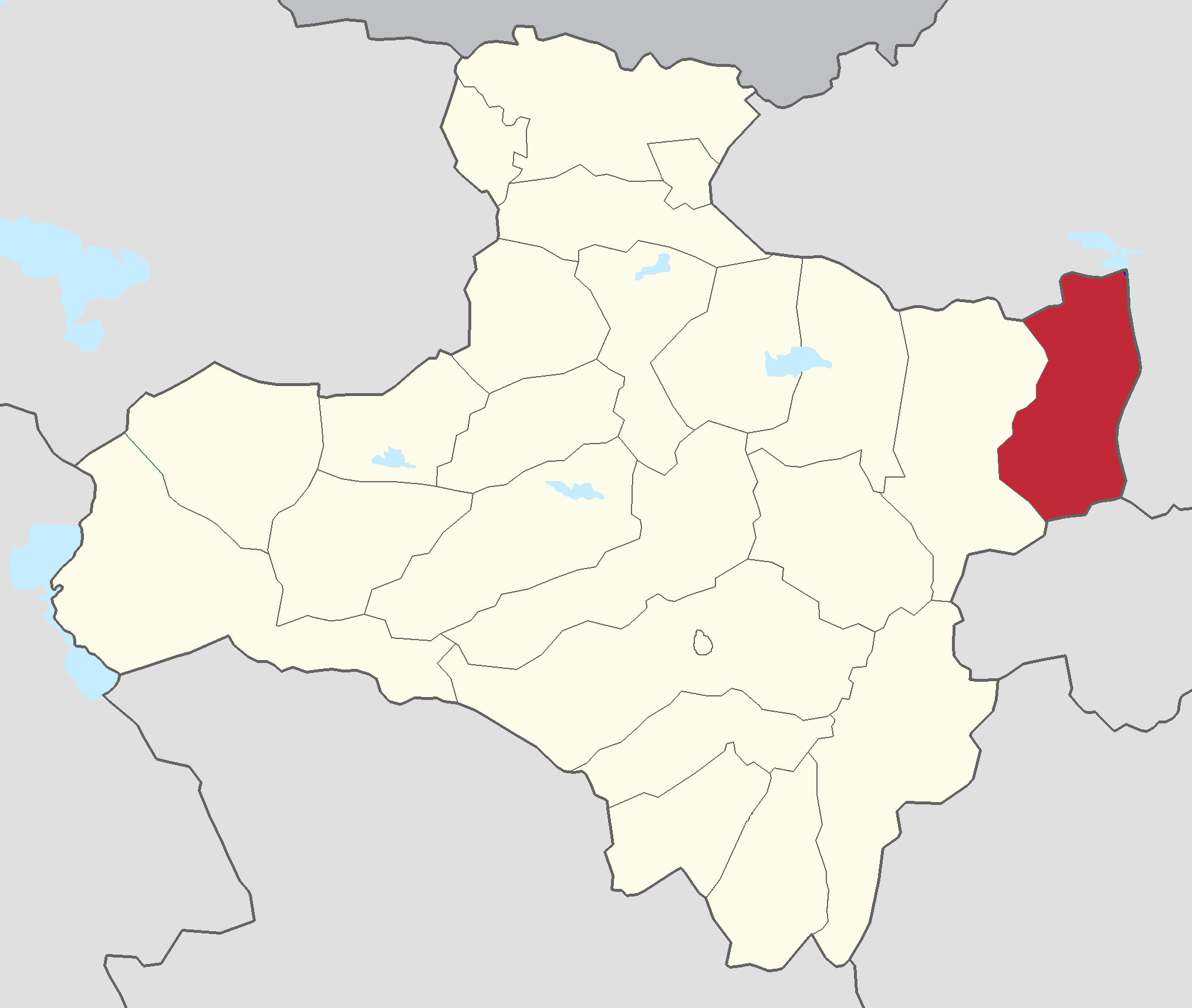
- Country: Mongolia
- Province: Zavkhan Province
- Time zone: UTC+8 (UTC + 8)
- Climate: Dwc

Ikh-Uul (Mongolian: Их-Уул) is a sum of Zavkhan Province in western Mongolia. In 2005, its population was 6,271.

== Geography ==
Ikh-Uul is the easternmost district in Zavkhan Province.

== Administrative divisions ==
The district is divided into six bags, which are:

- Bayan-Ukhaa
- Urjil
- Khuyagt (Mongolian: Хуягт)
- Khongor
- Tsetsuukh
- Zart
