= Tsagaanchuluut, Zavkhan =

District in Zavkhan Province, Mongolia

Coordinates: 47°06′42″N 96°40′20″E

Tsagaanchuluut District Цагаанчулуут сум ᠴᠠᠭᠠᠨ ᠴᠢᠯᠠᠭᠤᠳᠤ ᠰᠤᠮᠤ
- District
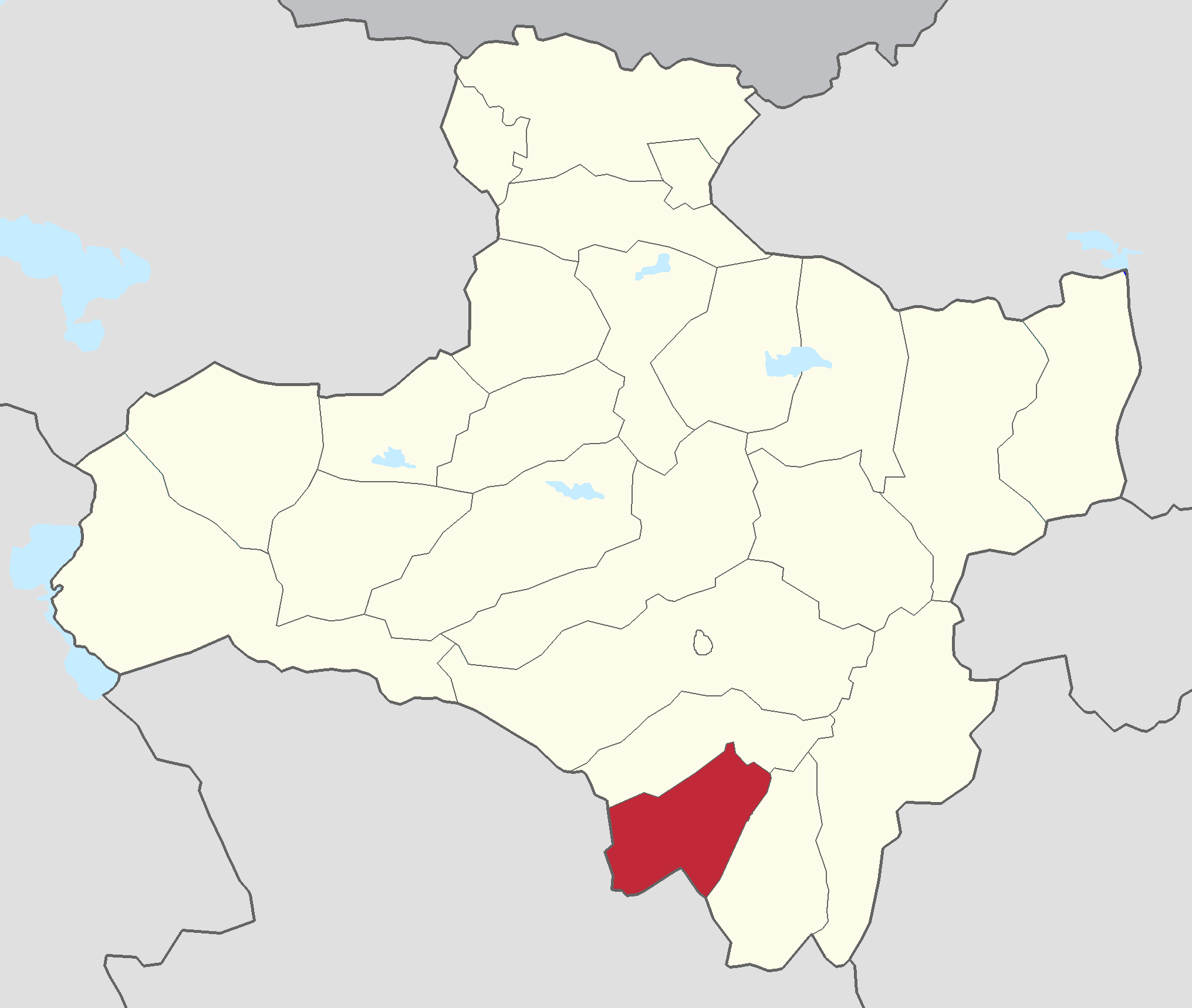
- Country: Mongolia
- Province: Zavkhan Province
- Time zone: UTC+8 (UTC + 8)
- Climate: BSk

Tsagaanchuluut (Mongolian: Цагаанчулуут [t͡sʰaʁá(ː)ɲt͡ɕʰʊɮʊ́(ː)tʰ]; lit. 'White Rock') is a district of Zavkhan Province in western Mongolia. In 2005, its population was 1,496. In the 2010's an gem thats in the shape of othontenger it sits outside of tsagaanchuluut in a caged place you can go and see it anytime

== Administrative divisions ==
The district is divided into four bags, which are:

- Arts
- Bayankhairkhan
- Delger
- Javtsag
