= Chuluut, Arkhangai =

District in Arkhangai Province, Mongolia

Coordinates: 47°32′12″N 100°13′34″E

Chuluut District Чулуут сум ᠴᠢᠯᠠᠭᠤᠲᠤᠰᠤᠮᠤ
- District
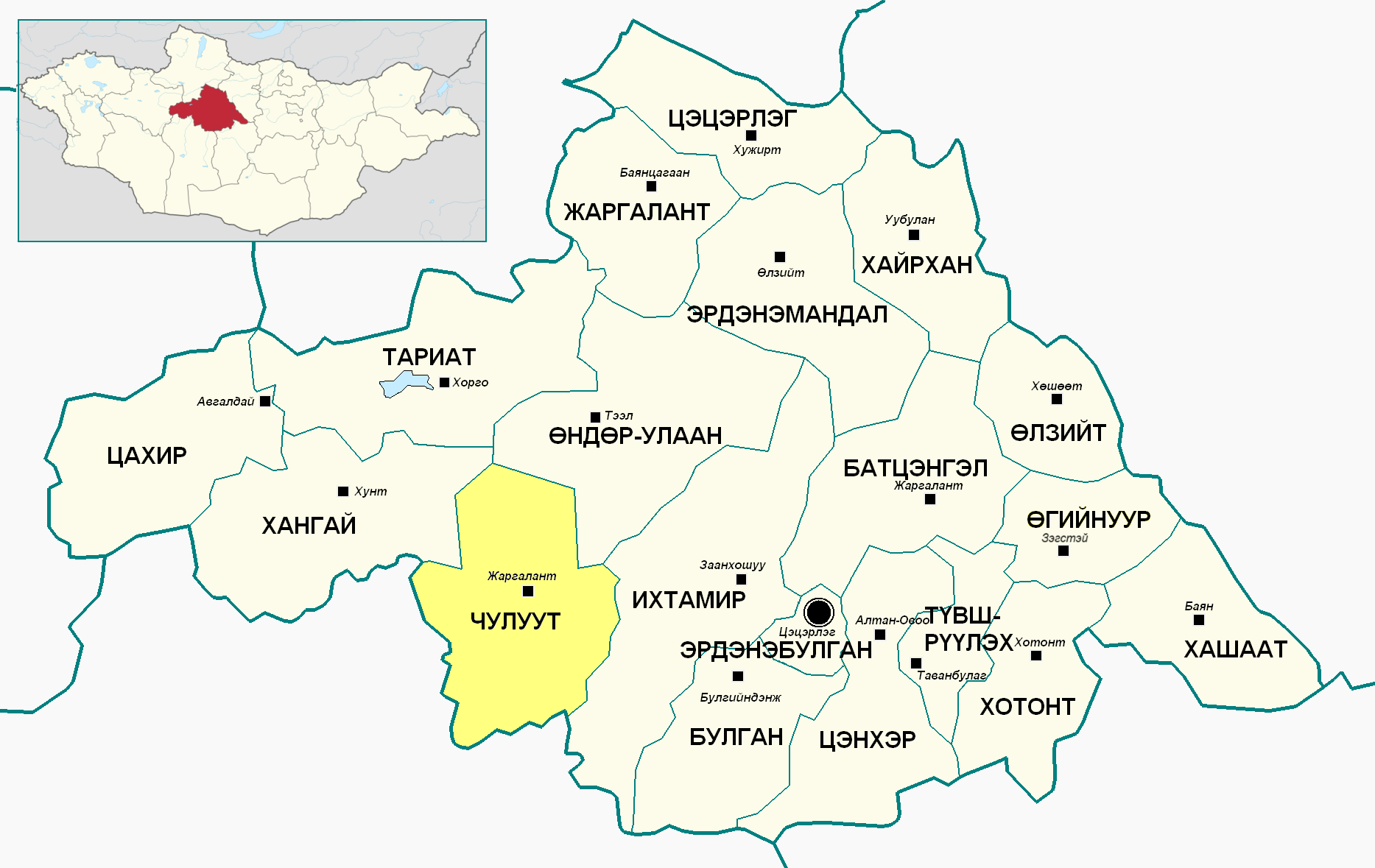
- Chuluut in Arkhangai
- Country: Mongolia
- Province: Arkhangai Province

Area
  - Total: 3,900 km^{2} (1,500 sq mi)
- Time zone: UTC+8 (UTC + 8)

Chuluut (Mongolian: Чулуут [t͡ɕʰʊɮʊ́(ː)tʰ]; lit. 'Rocky') is a district of Arkhangai Province in central Mongolia. It is named after the Chuluut River. In 2009, its population was 3,744.

== Administrative divisions ==
The district is divided into five bags, which are:

- Khairkhain
- Khaluun-Us
- Khurem
- Ulziit gol
- Zuunmod
