= Zavkhan, Uvs =

District in Uvs Province, Mongolia

Coordinates: 48°49′19″N 93°06′04″E

Zavkhan District Завхан сум ᠵᠠᠪᠬᠠᠨᠰᠤᠮᠤ
- District
- Interactive map of Zavkhan District
- Country: Mongolia
- Province: Uvs Province
- Time zone: UTC+7 (UTC + 7)

Zavkhan (Mongolian: Завхан [t͡sáʊχəɴ]) is a district of Uvs Province in western Mongolia.

== Geography ==
Zavkhan is the southern most district in Uvs Province.

== Administrative divisions ==
The district is divided into four bags, which are:

- Airag Nuur
- Kharmagt
- Khyargas Nuur
- Shar Bulag

== Tourist attractions ==
- Airag Lake
