= Zavkhanmandal, Zavkhan =

District in Zavkhan Province, Mongolia

Coordinates: 48°19′31″N 95°06′22″E

Zavkhanmandal District Завханмандал сум ᠵᠠᠪᠬᠠᠨᠮᠠᠨᠳᠠᠯᠰᠤᠮᠤ
- District
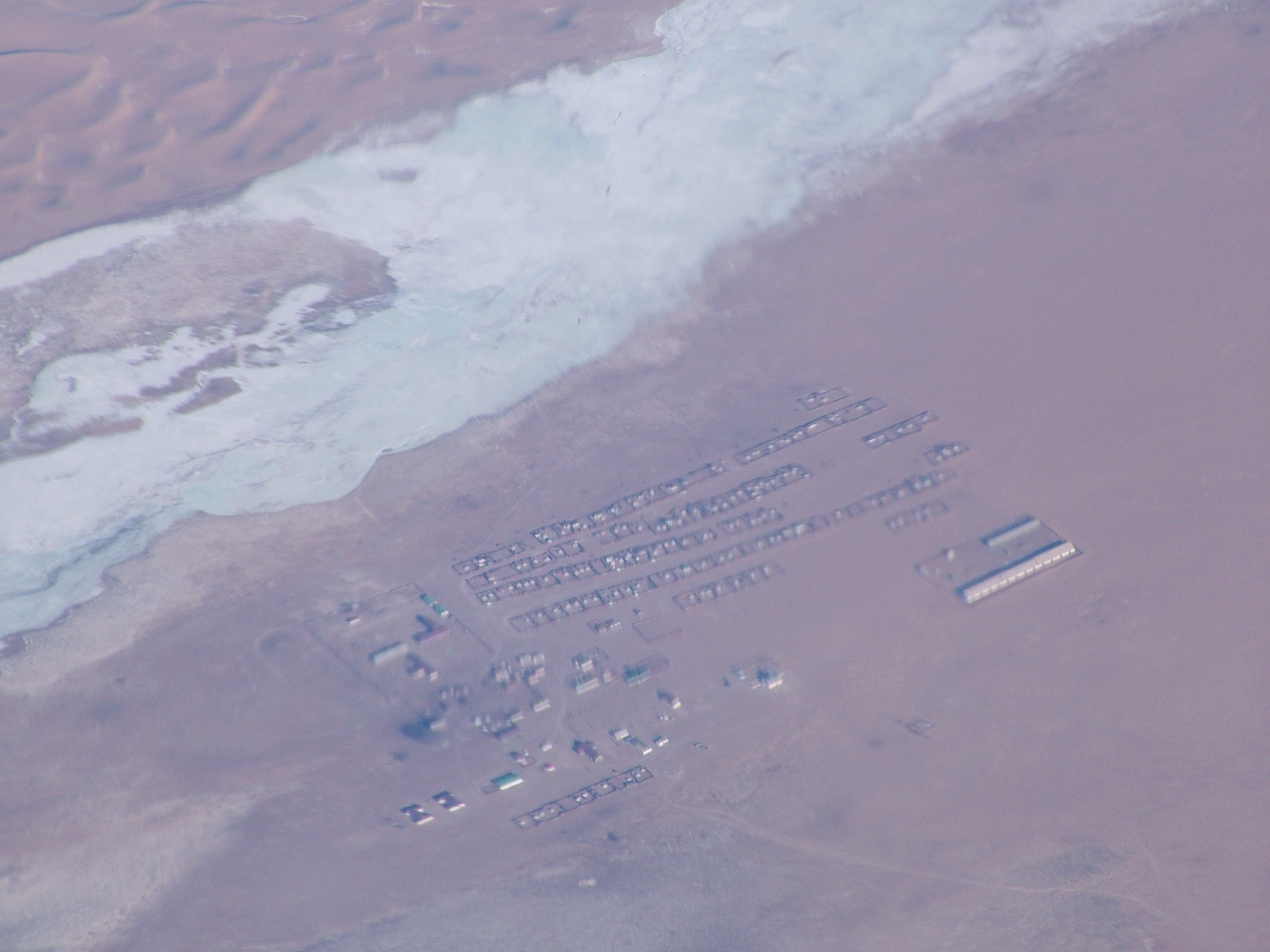
- Zavkhanmandal village from onboard a commercial airliner

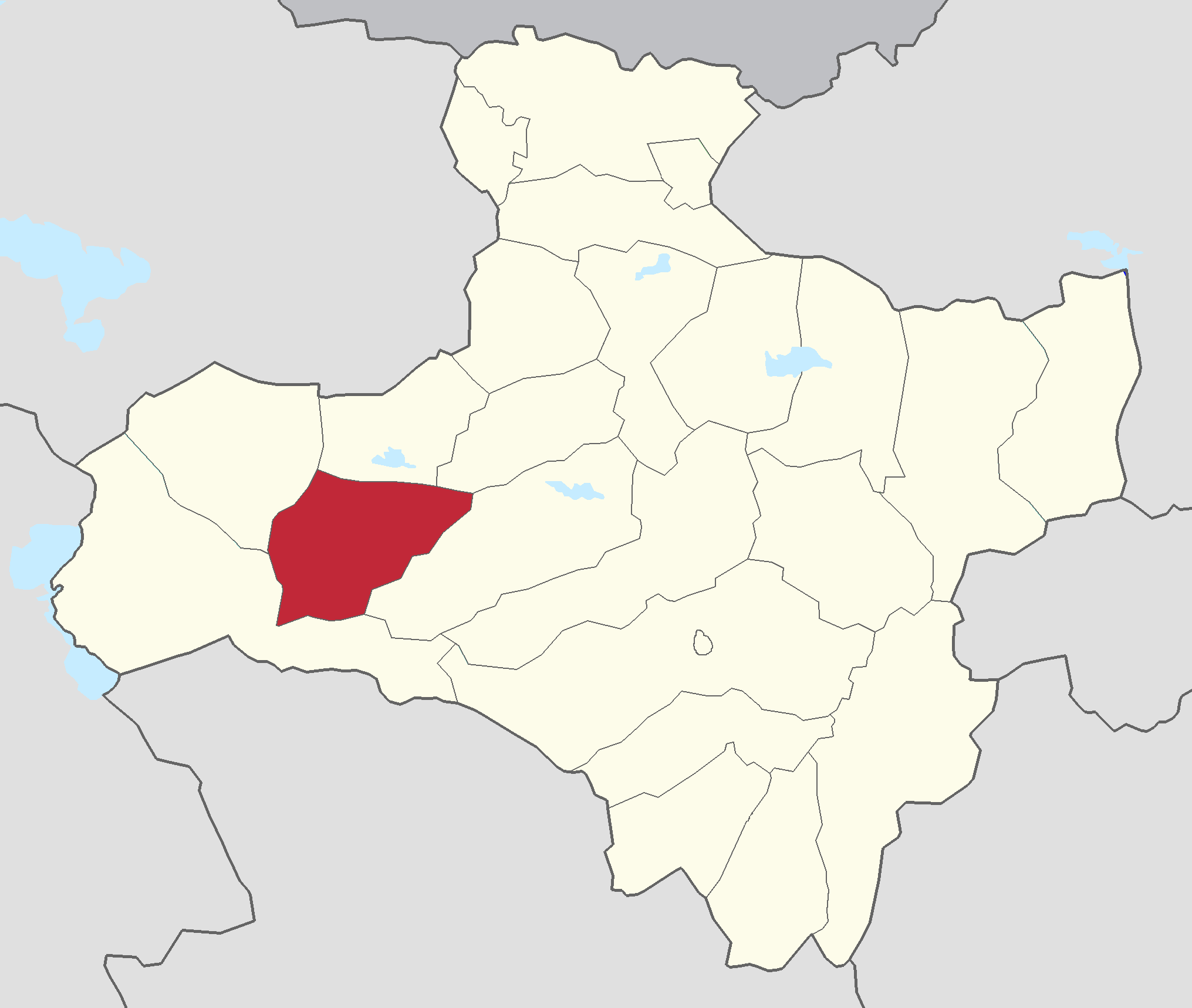
- Country: Mongolia
- Province: Zavkhan Province
- Time zone: UTC+8 (UTC + 8)
- Climate: BSk

Zavkhanmandal (Mongolian: Завханмандал) is a sum of Zavkhan Province in western Mongolia. The sum centre is 12 km south of Khar Lake. In 2005, its population was 1,324.

== Administrative divisions ==
The district is divided into four bags, which are:

- Mandal
- Nuga
- Olonbulag
- Olonturuu
