= Otgon, Zavkhan =

District in Zavkhan Province, Mongolia

Coordinates: 47°12′38″N 97°36′28″E

Otgon District Отгон сум ᠣᠳᠬᠠᠨᠰᠤᠮᠤ
- District
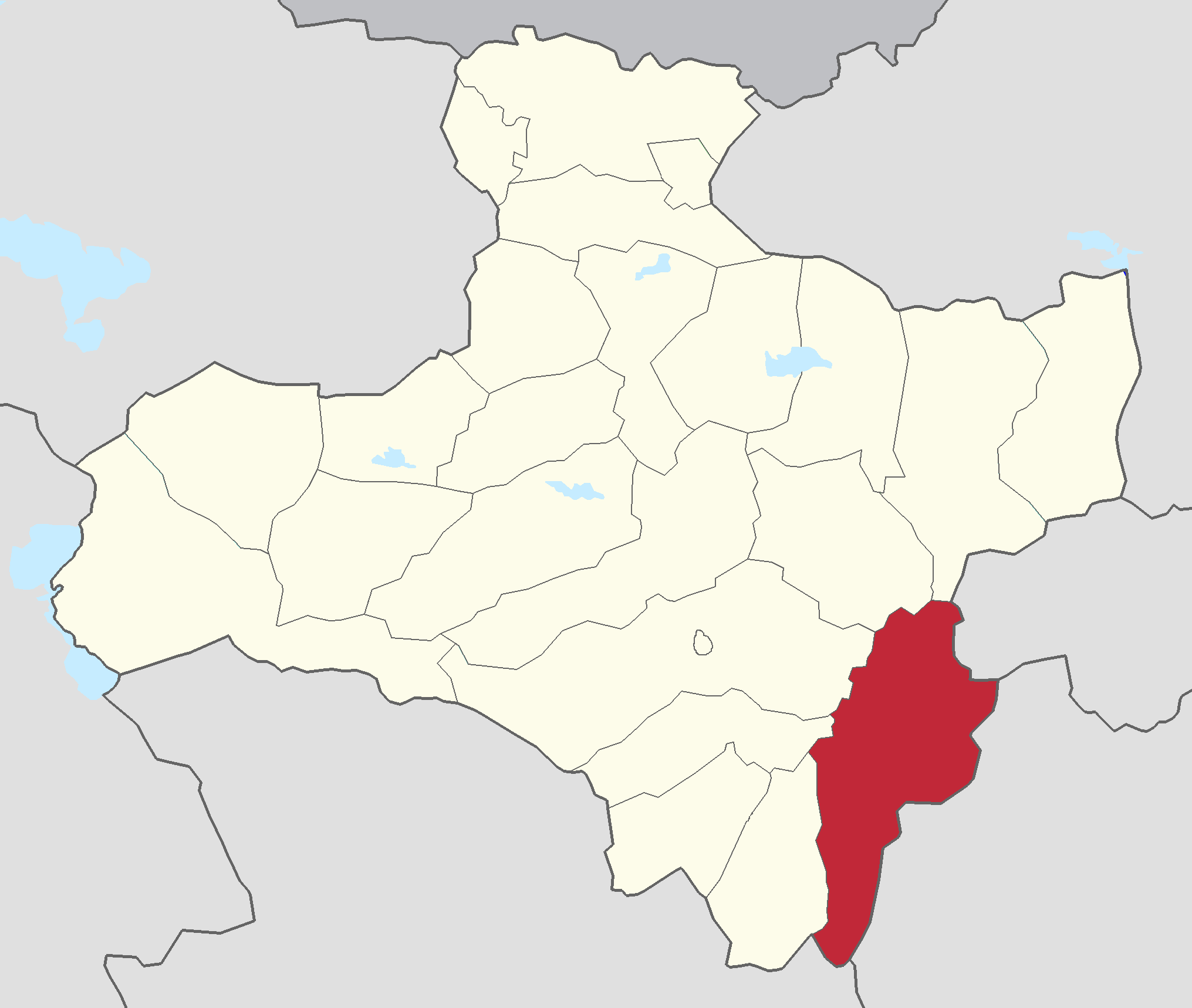
- Country: Mongolia
- Province: Zavkhan Province
- Time zone: UTC+8 (UTC + 8)
- Climate: BSk

Otgon (Mongolian: Отгон, The young) is a sum of Zavkhan Province in western Mongolia. In 2005, its population was 3,478.

== Administrative divisions ==
The district is divided into six bags, which are:

- Badral
- Bayanbulag
- Buyant
- Khujirt
- Onts
- Soyol
