= Zavkhan Province =

Mongolian province

Zavkhan Province Завхан аймаг (Mongolian) ᠵᠠᠪᠬᠠᠨᠠᠶᠢᠮᠠᠭ
- Province
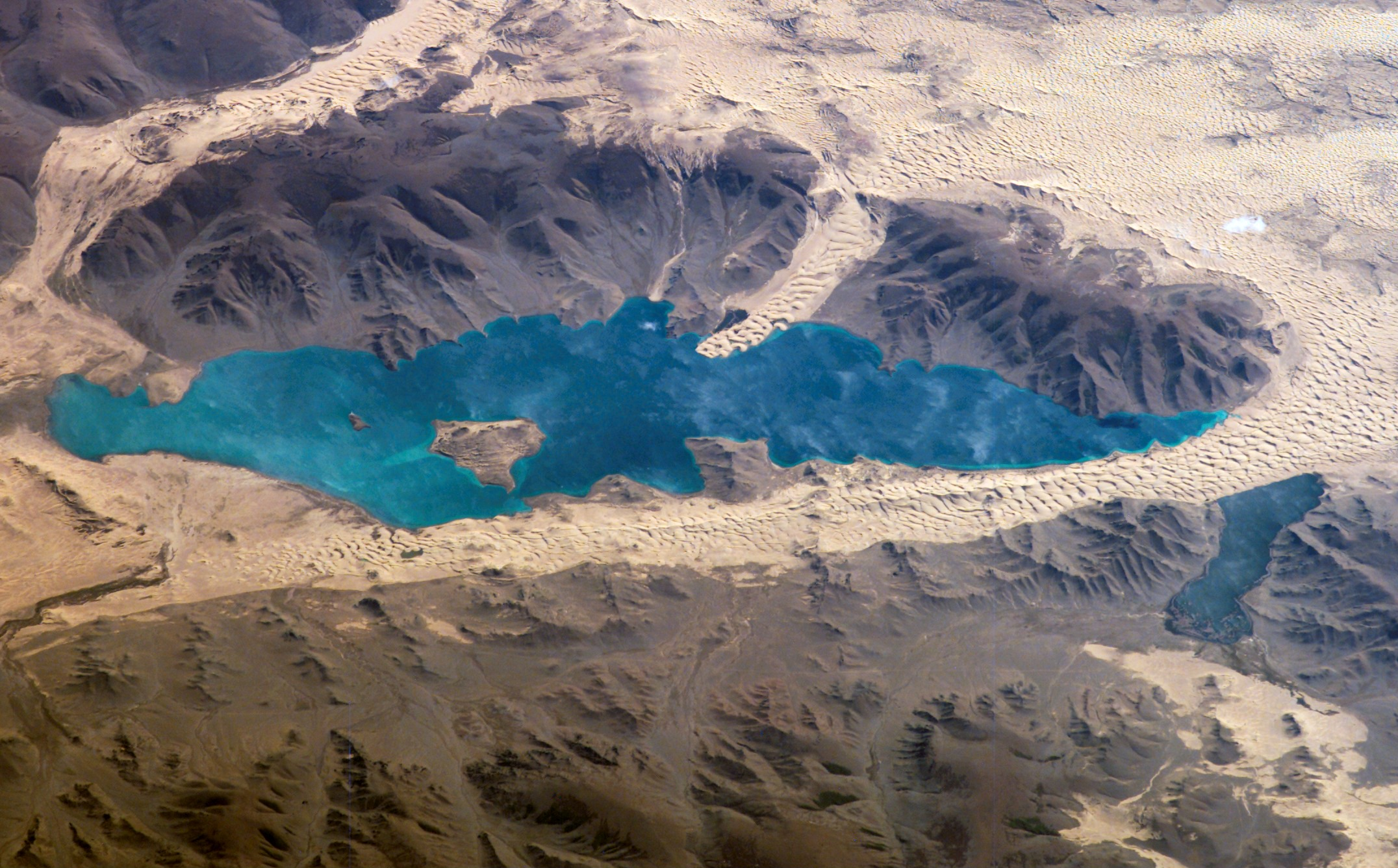
- Khar Lake from the International Space Station, 2006

- Flag Coat of arms

- Coordinates: 48°0′N 96°15′E
- Country: Mongolia
- Established: 1931
- Capital: Uliastai

Area
  - Total: 82,455.66 km^{2} (31,836.31 sq mi)
- Elevation: 1,886 m (6,188 ft)

Population (2025)
  - Total: 70,032
  - Density: 0.84933/km^{2} (2.1998/sq mi)

GDP
  - Total: MNT 652 billion US$ 0.2 billion (2022)
  - Per capita: MNT 8,856,280; US$ 2,836 (2022)
- Time zone: UTC+7
- Area code: +976 (0)146
- ISO 3166 code: MN-057
- Vehicle registration: ЗА_
- Website: www.zavkhan.gov.mn

Zavkhan (/ˈzaʊxɑːn/; Mongolian: Завхан ᠵᠠᠪᠬᠠᠨ [ˈt͡saw̜χəɴ]), also spelt Zaukhan or Zabhkhan is one of the 21 aimags (provinces) of Mongolia, located in the west of the country, 1,104 km from Ulaanbaatar. Its capital is Uliastai. The aimag is named after the Zavkhan River, which forms the border between Zavkhan and Gobi-Altai aimag.

== Environment ==
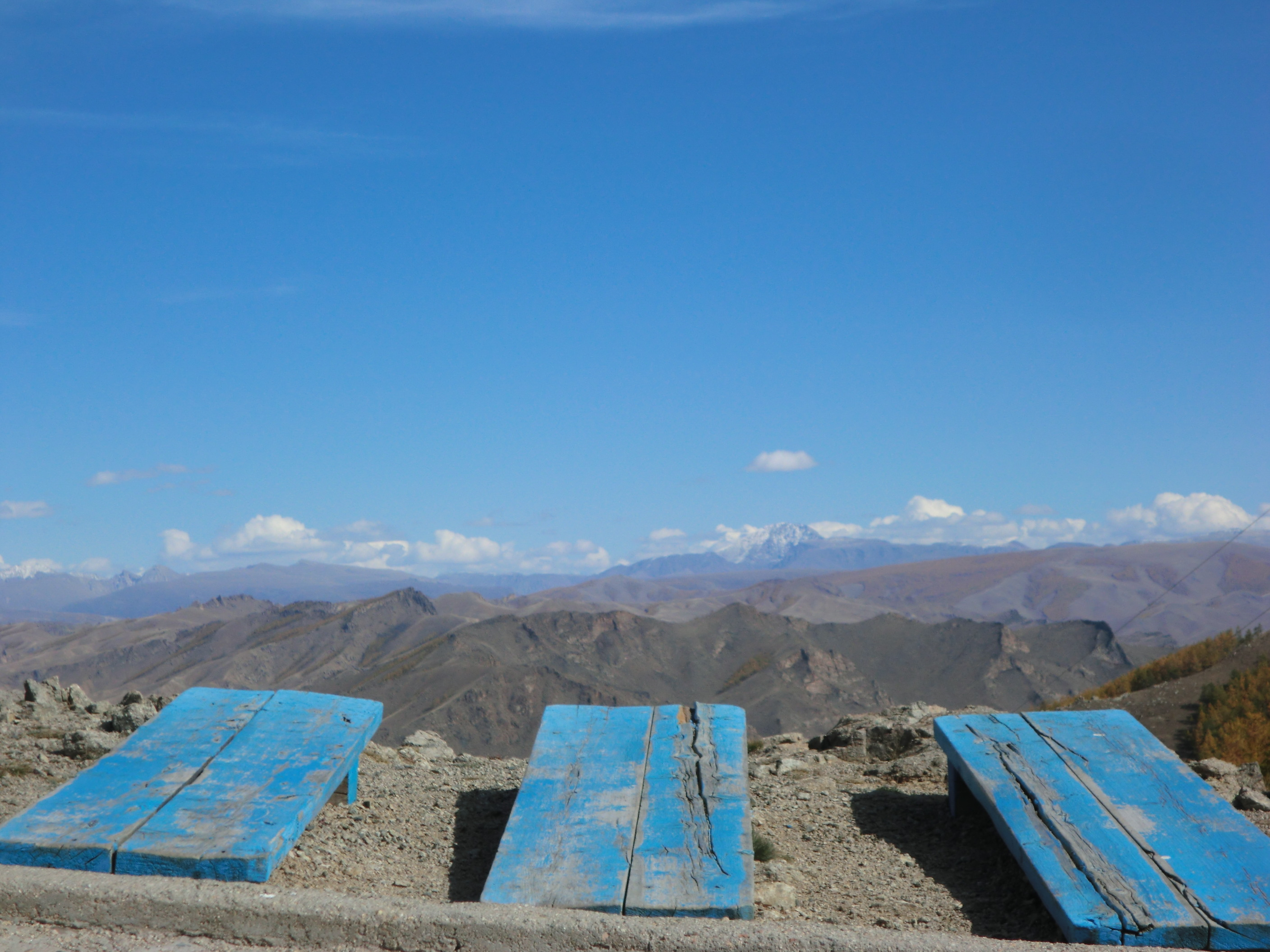
Boards used for prayer towards the sacred mountain Otgontenger, from a viewing point 15km outside of Uliastai, Zavkhan aimag, Mongolia

Locally, Zavkhan's environment is considered "Gobi-Khangai" (Говь хангай), since it connects the Gobi Desert in the south with the western Khangai Mountain Range and the broad lake basin of Khovd aimag.

The highest peak in the province is Otgontenger (Отгонтэнгэр, lit. "youngest sky") both the highest (4,031 m) and only peak in the Khangai range capped with a permanent glacier. The mountain is located in the 95,510 hectare Otgon Tenger Strictly Protected Area, about 60 km east of Uliastai. An image of the mountain can be seen on the aimag's coat of arms. Otgontenger is associated with the Bodhisattva Ochirvaani (Очирваань).

The western and south-western regions of Zavkhan contain the massive Bor Khyarin Els sand dunes that stretch for over 100 km within the Zavkhan, down into Gobi-Altai aimag. One of the largest lakes in Zavkhan, Bayan Nuur (баян нуур, "rich lake") is nestled among the dunes.

== Climate ==
Zavkhan has some of the coldest winter temperatures in Mongolia. It has even been known to snow in summer. In Tosontsengel, the largest sum in Zavkhan, winter temperatures as low as −52.9 °C (−63.2 °F) have been recorded. That sum also holds the record for the highest mean sea level barometric pressure ever recorded on Earth 1,085.7 hectopascals or 32.061 inches of mercury, measured on 19 December 2001.

Most precipitation falls in the summer months as rain, with some snow in the adjacent months of May and September. Winters are typically very dry.

== Wildlife ==
Aside from having massive livestock populations, Zavkhan's broad ecological regions and deep forests are home to a diverse population of wildlife: Gobi bears, Mongolian khulans, wild boars, spotted deer, argali, wild goats, ibexes, Mongolian wolves, Corsac foxes, marmots, mongooses, Eurasian lynxes, hares, and both Mongolian and goitered gazelle.

Many forest, mountain and migratory birds can be found in the aimag, including rare snowcocks and bobwhites, as well as swans, vultures, falcons and hawks.

Fishing is a popular pastime in Zavkhan. Khar Nuur and Bayan Nuur lakes are rich with fish, and many of the hundreds of smaller rivers throughout the province provide decent fishing.

== Population ==
Population growth in Zavkhan aimag stopped in 1994, then migration out of the aimag (approx. 40,000 in 1995-2005) reduced its population to the end of 1979 level. The majority of the population is ethnic Khalkha but there are sizable Khotgoid and Kazakh minorities.

Zavkhan aimag population
1956 census	1960 est.	1963 census	1969 census	1975 est.	1979 census	1981 est.	1989 census	1990 est.	1992 est.	1994 est.	1996 est.	1998 est.	2000 census	2002 est.	2005 est.	2008 est.
55,100	61,000	60,000	70,800	76,000	79,800	81,700	88,500	91,960	102,834	103,150	102,341	100,905	87,686	83,516	78,668	76,614

== Notable natives and residents ==
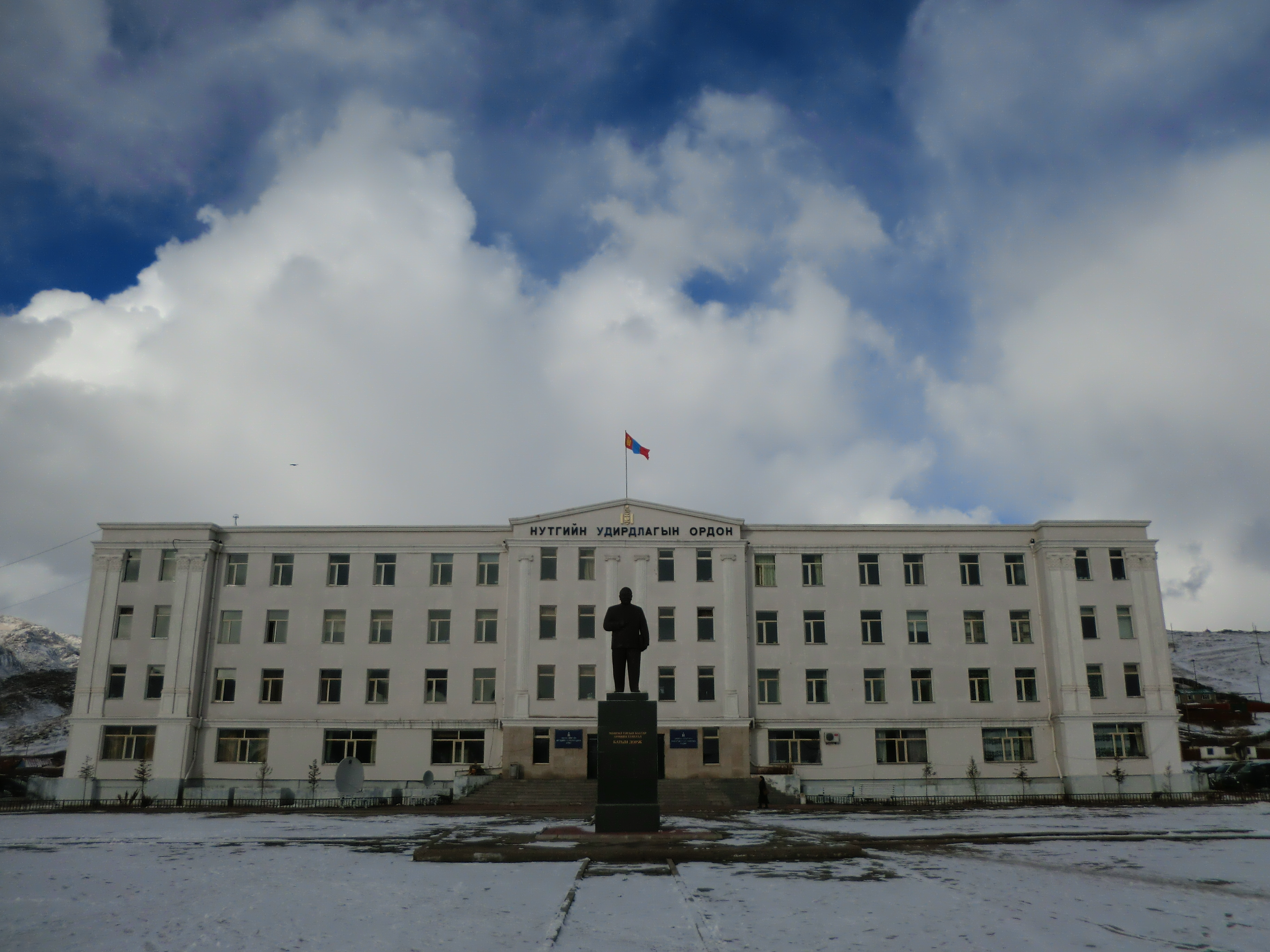
The Government Administration Building - Uliastai, Zavkhan aimag, Mongolia (A statue of Zavkhan-born, Mongolian Army General, Batiindorj is in the foreground)

- Punsalmaagiin Ochirbat, First President of Mongolia (1990-1997)
- Natsagiin Bagabandi, Second President of Mongolia (1997-2005)
- S. Damdinbazar Mongolian Jalkhanz Khotagt (Жалханз Хутагт, "reincarnated saint") Independence activist and Prime Minister of Mongolia (1922-1923)
- Begziin Yavuukhulan, Mongolian poet
- Noroviin Baatar, Mongolian ballet dancer and film actor
- B. Jamsranjav, Mongolian Saint, Lama
- S. Chimedtseren, Mongolian Saint, Lama

== Economy ==
Herders breed each of the "5 Kinds" (5-н хошуу мал) of animal in Zavkhan. In 2005, the aimag was home to 2.1 million head of livestock, among them 1.03 million sheep, 861,000 goats, 107,000 cattle and yaks, 101,000 horses, and 6,300 camels.

The area is also rich with mineral resources such as iron ore, tin, gold, copper, diamonds, molybdenum ore, and phosphorite. While Zavkhan's mineral wealth remains largely been unexploited, in 2012 the Golden Hill Project mine was built by Bayan Airag Exploration LLC outside of Durvuljin soum.

In 2018, the province contributed to 1.08% of the total national GDP of Mongolia.

== Transportation ==
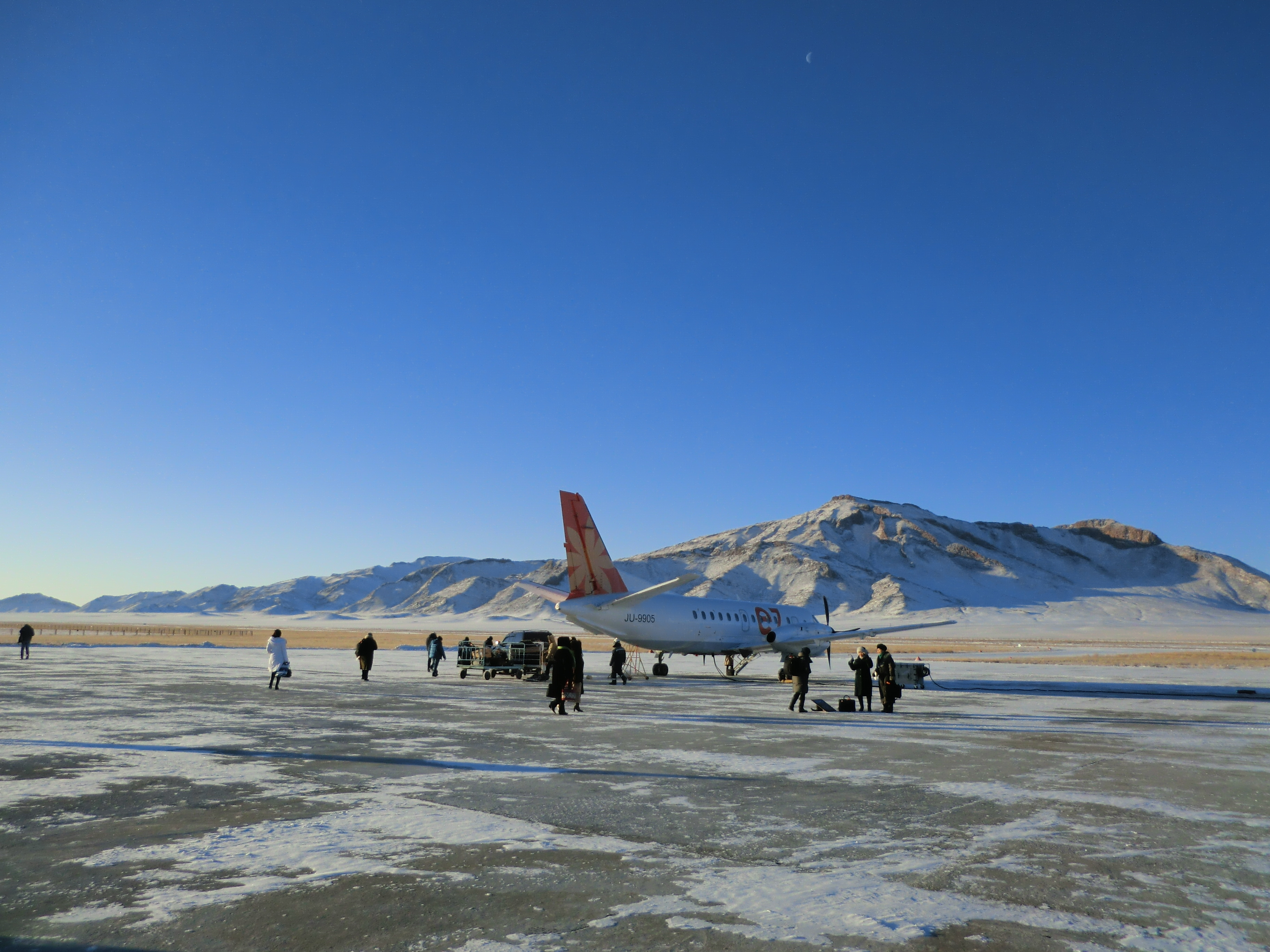
Passengers boarding a propeller plane to Ulaanbaatar at Donoi Airport (Uliastai) Zavkhan, Mongolia.

The old Uliastai Airport has two unpaved runways and is located close to the city, but it has no regular flights operating. Since 2002, the Donoi Airport (or "New Uliastai Airport") with one unpaved runway is located about 25 km west of the city and gets served by regular flights to and from Ulaanbaatar.

== Administrative subdivisions ==
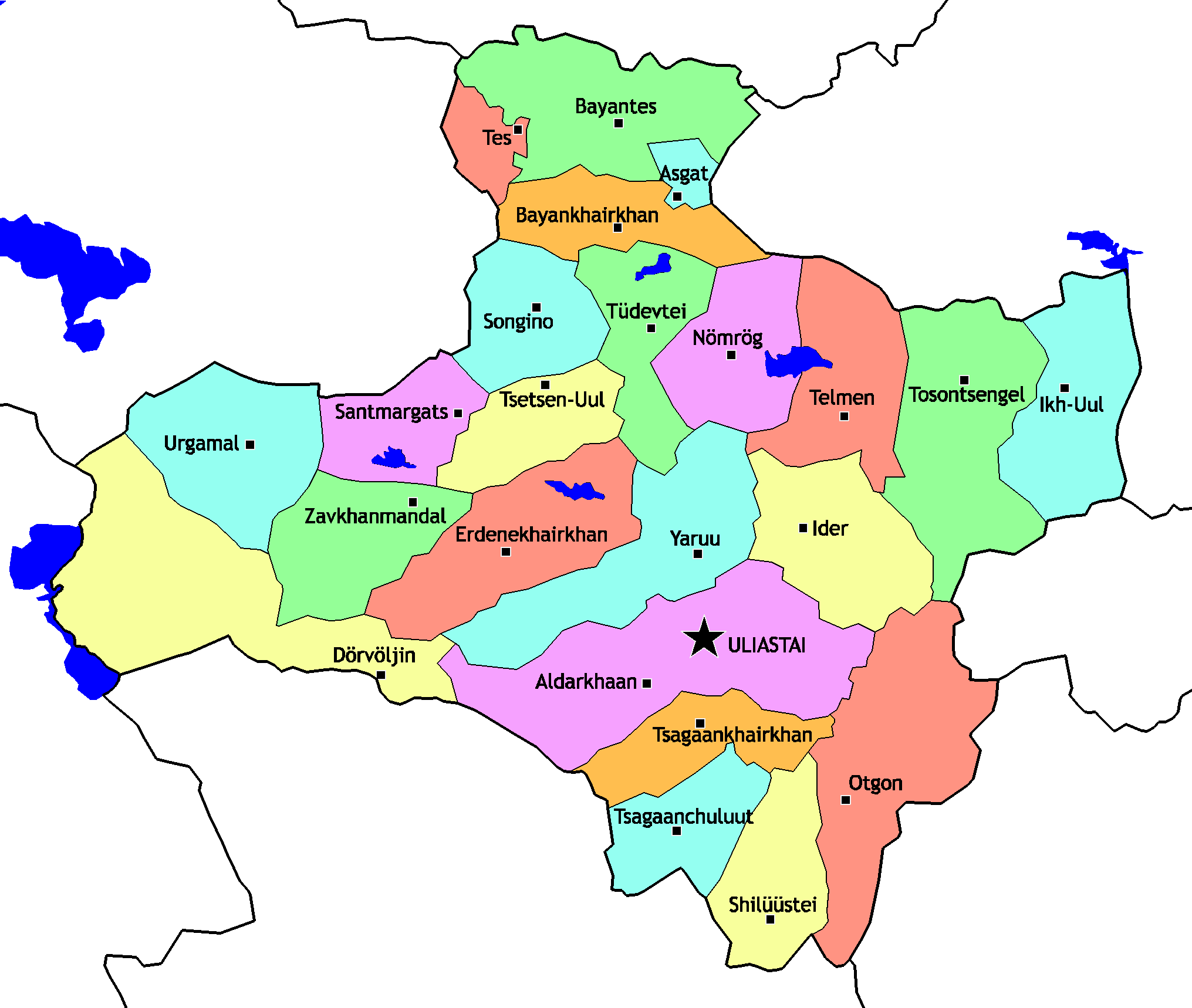
Sums of Zavkhan

The Sums of Zavkhan Aimag
Sum	Mongolian	Population (2005)
Aldarkhaan	Алдархаан	3,708
Asgat	Асгат	1,125
Bayankhairhan	Баянхайрхан	1,968
Bayantes	Баянтэс	3,024
Dörvöljin	Дөрвөлжин	2,323
Erdenekhairkhan	Эрдэнэхайрхан	1,771
Ider	Идэр	2,714
Ikh-Uul	Их-Уул	6,271
Nömrög	Нөмрөг	1,848
Otgon	Отгон	3,478
Santmargats	Сантмаргац	2,101
Shilüüstei	Шилүүстэй	2,450
Songino	Сонгино	1,921
Telmen	Тэлмэн	2,820
Tes	Тэс	3,230
Tosontsengel	Тосонцэнгэл	9,045
Tsagaanchuluut	Цагаанчулуут	1,496
Tsagaankhairkhan	Цагаанхайрхан	1,823
Tsetsen-Uul	Цэцэн-Уул	2,114
Tüdevtei	Түдэвтэй	2,003
Uliastai *	Улиастай	15,742
Urgamal	Ургамал	1,822
Yaruu	Яруу	2,547
Zavkhanmandal	Завханмандал	1,324

* The aimag capital is Uliastai
