= Bags of Mongolia =

Administrative subdivision of Mongolia

A bag (/bɑːɡ/ BAHG; Mongolian: баг [paq]) or bagh is a third-level subdivision of Mongolia. It forms a constituent of a sum.

Mongolia has a total of 1,664 bags.

== History ==
During the Qing dynasty, some banners in Outer Mongolia had Bagh organizations, though these were not recorded in official historical records. According to archives, certain banners under the Khalkha Mongol tribes, such as the Chechen Khan, Güshi Khan, and Sain Noyan, had Bagh organizations. During the Bogd Khanate period (the period of Mongolian autonomy), Bagh was established as an administrative unit. After the establishment of the Mongolian People's Republic, it continued as a village-level administrative division. In Inner Mongolia, during the Qing dynasty, the Alashan Erut Banner and Maomingan Banner also had Bagh organizations.

== Etymology ==
The word bag is derived from Persian باغ bāgh, meaning 'orchard' or 'garden'.
