= Zeneemyadar Batbayar =

Mongolian public servant

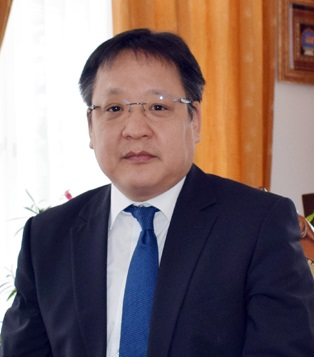

Head of Water Agency
- In office 2005–2012; 2024–Present

Mongolian Ambassador to Hungary
- In office 2016–2021

Personal details
- Born: February 19, 1974 Altai, Govi-Altai, Mongolia
- Education: Eötvös Loránd University(ELTE)
- Profession: Lawyer

Zeneemyadar Batbayar (Mongolian: Зэнээмядарын Батбаяр, born 19 February 1974) is a Mongolian government official and public servant currently serving as the Head of the Water Agency of Mongolia since 2024. He is known for his work in water resource management, drinking water quality, and environmental protection in Mongolia.

== Early life and education ==
Batbayar was born on February 19, 1974, in Altai, Gobi-Altai Province, Mongolia.

He completed his secondary education at School No. 1 in Ulaanbaatar from 1982 to 1992. From 1992 to 1993, he studied at the Law School of the National University of Mongolia.

He continued his studies in Hungary, attending a language preparatory school in Budapest from 1993 to 1994, and later the Faculty of Law at Eötvös Loránd University, where he obtained a Doctorate in Education in 1999. In 2003–2004, he completed the Executive MBA Program of Maastricht University held in Ulaanbaatar, Mongolia.

== Career ==
- 1999–2003 – Legal Advisor, Nomin Holding LLC
- 2003–2005 – Executive Director, State Department Store JSC
- 2005–2012 – Deputy Head, Water Agency of Mongolia
- 2012–2014 – Advisor to the Minister of Finance of Mongolia
- 2013–2016 – Secretary for Foreign Affairs, Mongolian parliamentary political party
- 2016–2021 – Ambassador Extraordinary and Plenipotentiary of Mongolia to Hungary
- 2022–2023 – Team Leader, Research Group, Shikhikhutug University
- 2024–present – Head of the Water Agency of Mongolia
