= Puntsagiin Jasrai =

Mongolian politician

- Пунцагийн Жасрай
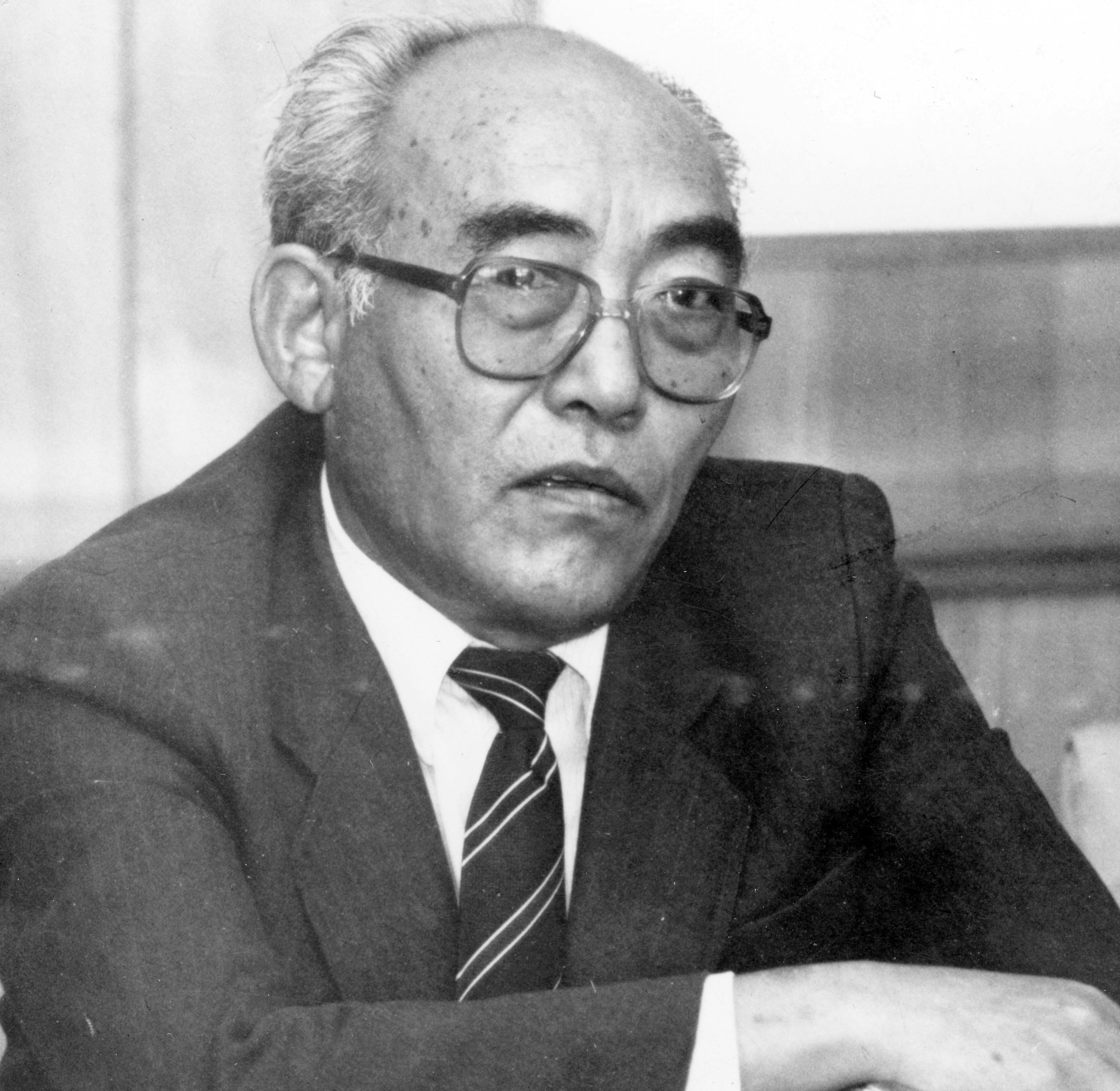
- Jasrai in 1996

17th Prime Minister of Mongolia
- In office 21 July 1992 – 19 July 1996
- President: Punsalmaagiin Ochirbat
- Preceded by: Dashiin Byambasüren
- Succeeded by: Mendsaikhany Enkhsaikhan

Member of the State Great Khural
- In office 28 June 1992 – July 2004

Personal details
- Born: 26 November 1933 Bugat, Govi-Altai, Mongolia
- Died: 25 October 2007 (aged 73) Ulaanbaatar, Mongolia
- Resting place: Altan-Ölgii National Cemetery
- Party: Mongolian People's Revolutionary Party (since 1951)
- Education: Moscow Higher School of Economics
- Profession: Politician, economist
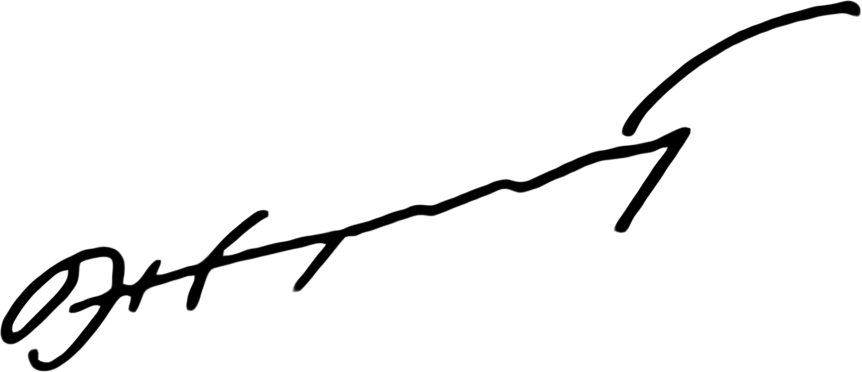
- Signature

Puntsagiin Jasrai (Mongolian: Пунцагийн Жасрай; 26 November 1933 – 25 October 2007) was a Mongolian politician and economist. He was the prime minister of Mongolia from 21 July 1992 to 19 July 1996, the first democratically elected prime minister after the ratification of the 1992 Constitution.

== Education and early career ==
Jasrai was born in 1933 in the sum (district) of Bugat in the Govi-Altai Province. In 1950, he graduated from high school in Tonkhil, Govi-Altai. He then worked for six years as an education inspector from 1950 to 1956. In 1951, he joined the Mongolian People's Revolutionary Party (MPRP), the sole legal party of the Mongolian People's Republic.

In 1961, he graduated from the Moscow Higher School of Economics in the Soviet Union with a degree in agricultural economics. From 1970 to 1975, he served as chairman of the State Prices Committee. During which he was also elected a deputy to the People's Great Khural, for the first of four times, from 1973 to 1986. From 1976 to 1978, he was head of the Planning and Finance Department of the MPRP Central Committee. In 1978, he became the first deputy chairman of the State Planning Commission, and in 1984, he was appointed deputy chairman of the Council of Ministers. Later in 1988, he became the first deputy chairman of the Council of Ministers and subsequently, a candidate member of the Politburo in 1989.

In the mid-1980s, Jasrai became one of Mongolia's earliest proponents of free market reforms.

Following the fall of communism in 1990, along with Chairman of the Council of Ministers Jambyn Batmönkh, Jasrai resigned from the government and the politburo of the MPRP and became president of the Association of Mongolian Production and Services Cooperatives. In this role, he made several consultative visits to foreign countries, establishing important contacts to support the development of Mongolia's economy. He was characterized as straightforward and honest.

== Prime minister ==
Jasrai was elected to the Mongolian State Great Khural on 28 June 1992, representing the 26th constituency of Ulaanbaatar. At the first parliamentary session on 20 July 1992, he was appointed prime minister. Before the nomination, Jasrai told members of the State Great Khural that he was "not a politician, rather a simple economist" and promised that, if elected, he would work towards expanding economic development and democracy in Mongolia.

In June 1993, Jasrai visited the United States and met with government representatives and took part in an economic symposium. He also met with World Bank and International Monetary Fund representatives and spoke at the National Press Club.

Later in the summer of 1993, opposition parties strongly criticized Jasrai and his government for not doing enough to prevent a worsening of the economy, and continued to call for his resignation throughout most of his term in office. During this period, opposition parties joined to create the Democratic Union Coalition (DUC). In the July 1996 parliamentary elections, the DUC won a landslide majority and formed the first non-MPRP government since 1921. Mendsaikhany Enkhsaikhan was subsequently appointed Prime Minister, succeeding Jasrai on 19 July. He retained his seat in the State Great Khural and served two consecutive full terms until 2004.

== Death ==
Jasrai died on 25 October 2007 in Ulaanbaatar at the age of 73.

Political offices
| Preceded by Dashiin Byambasüren | Prime Minister of Mongolia; July 21, 1992 – July 19, 1996 | Succeeded by Mendsaikhany Enkhsaikhan |
