= Govi-Altai Central Stadium =

Stadium in Altai, Govi-Altai, Mongolia

- Говь-Алтай Төв Цэнгэлдэх хүрээлэн
- Location within Mongolia
- Coordinates: 46°22′11.3″N 96°14′21.0″E
- Capacity: 3,500 seats
- Type: stadium

Construction
- Rebuilt: September 2023
- Cost: ₮7,068,920,368
- Architect: Al Aid Group LLC
- Main contractor: Arvin Belt LLC

The Govi-Altai Central Stadium (Mongolian: Говь-Алтай Төв Цэнгэлдэх хүрээлэн) is a stadium in Altai City, Govi-Altai Province, Mongolia.

== History ==
The construction of the stadium started in June 2020 to replace the old existing stadium. On 20 July 2023, the local government took over the ownership of the building. The construction of the stadium completed in September 2023.

== Architecture ==
The stadium was built by Arvin Belt LLC as the main developer. It was designed by Al Aid Group LLC architectural firm. It has a capacity of 3,500 seats.

== Finance ==
The stadium was constructed with a cost of ₮7,068,920,368. It was fully funded by the local government.
