= Erdene =

Erdene is a Mongolian word meaning "jewel".

== Places in Mongolia ==
- Erdene, Dornogovi, a district of Dornogovi Province
- Erdene, Govi-Altai, a district of Govi-Altai Province
- Erdene, Töv, a district of Töv Province

== People ==
- Erdene (given name)
- Sengiin Erdene (1929-2000), Mongolian novelist and writer
- Terunofuji Haruo, born Gantulgyn Gan-Erdene, a Japanese-Mongolian sumo wrestler
