= Tayan Nuur mine =

Mine in Tseel, Govi-Altai, Mongolia

Tayan Nuur
- Location in Mongolia
- Location: Tayan Nuur, Govi-Altai, Mongolia; 45°32′42″N 95°37′02″E
- Company: Altain Khuder LLC
- Website: altainkhuder.mn

The Tayan Nuur mine (Mongolian: Таян Нуур) is an open-pit iron ore mining project in Tseel district within the Govi-Altai Province of Mongolia, approximately 162 kilometres (146 mi) south of the Gobi Altai Province capital Altai. The site was discovered in 2006, and is being developed by Altain Khuder LLC of Mongolia, a Mongolian-registered mining and mineral exploration company. Since its initial drilling exploration, Altain Khuder LLC developed Tayan Nuur mine into one of the leading iron ore mines in Mongolia. Tayan Nuur mine produces over 60% Fe grade iron ore concentrates and exports it to steel mills in China.
