= Dariv Formation =

Geologic formation in Govi-Altai, Mongolia

- Stratigraphic range: Late Jurassic
- Type: Geological formation

Lithology
- Primary: Mudstone, sandstone

Location
- Coordinates: 46.3°N 94.1°E
- Approximate paleocoordinates: 48.3°N 95.8°E
- Region: Govi-Altai Province
- Country: Mongolia

Type section
- Named for: Dariv
- Dariv Formation (Mongolia)

The Dariv Formation is a Late Jurassic geologic formation in Govi-Altay, Mongolia. Dinosaur remains diagnostic to the genus level are among the fossils that have been recovered from the mudstones and sandstones of the formation.

== Fossil content ==
- Mamenchisaurus sp. (sauropod indet)

== See also ==
- List of dinosaur-bearing rock formations
  - List of stratigraphic units with few dinosaur genera
