= Zeegt Coal Mine =

Coal mine in Chandmani, Govi-Altai, Mongolia

- Location within Mongolia
- Location: Chandmani, Govi-Altai, Mongolia; 45°22′20.0″N 97°53′26.5″E
- Products: coal

The Zeegt Coal Mine is a coal mine in Chandmani District, Govi-Altai Province, Mongolia.

== History ==
The mine owner obtained license for a 25-hectare of coal deposit within the area in 1997. In 2006, it obtained another two more licences. The overburden removal was done in 2010.

== Geology ==
The mine as a proven reserve of 64 million tons. It covers an area of 584 hectares. The average thickness of the coal layer is 16 meters.

== Business ==
The mine is operated by Gobi Coal and Energy Company.

== See also ==
- Mining in Mongolia
