= Serven Solar Power Plant =

Photovoltaic power plant in Altai City, Dornogovi, Mongolia

- Official name: Сэрвэн Нарны Цахилгаан Станц
- Country: Mongolia
- Location: Altai City, Govi-Altai
- Coordinates: 46°25′31.8″N 96°18′56.0″E
- Status: Operational
- Commission date: 2023
- Construction cost: US$10.4 million

Power generation
- Nameplate capacity: 10 MW
- Annual net output: 20 GWh

The Serven Solar Power Plant (Mongolian: Сэрвэн Нарны Цахилгаан Станц) is a photovoltaic power station in Altai City, Govi-Altai Province, Mongolia.

== History ==
The project to construct the power plant was approved in September 2018. The power plant was commissioned in 2023 in an inaugural ceremony held on 3 September 2023 attended by Prime Minister Luvsannamsrain Oyun-Erdene.

== Technical specifications ==
The power plant has an installed generation capacity of 10 MW. It generates 20 GWh of energy annually.

== Finance ==
The power plant was constructed with a cost of US$10.4 million. It was funded by loan from the Asian Development Bank and co-financed by the Strategic Climate Fund and Joint Crediting Mechanism.

== See also ==
- List of power stations in Mongolia
