= Bayan-Uul =

Bayan-Uul is the name of two sums (districts) in Mongolia:

- Bayan-Uul, Dornod
- Bayan-Uul, Govi-Altai
