= Bandiin Dambiinyam =

Mongolian architect

Bandiin Dambiinyam Бандийн Дамбийням
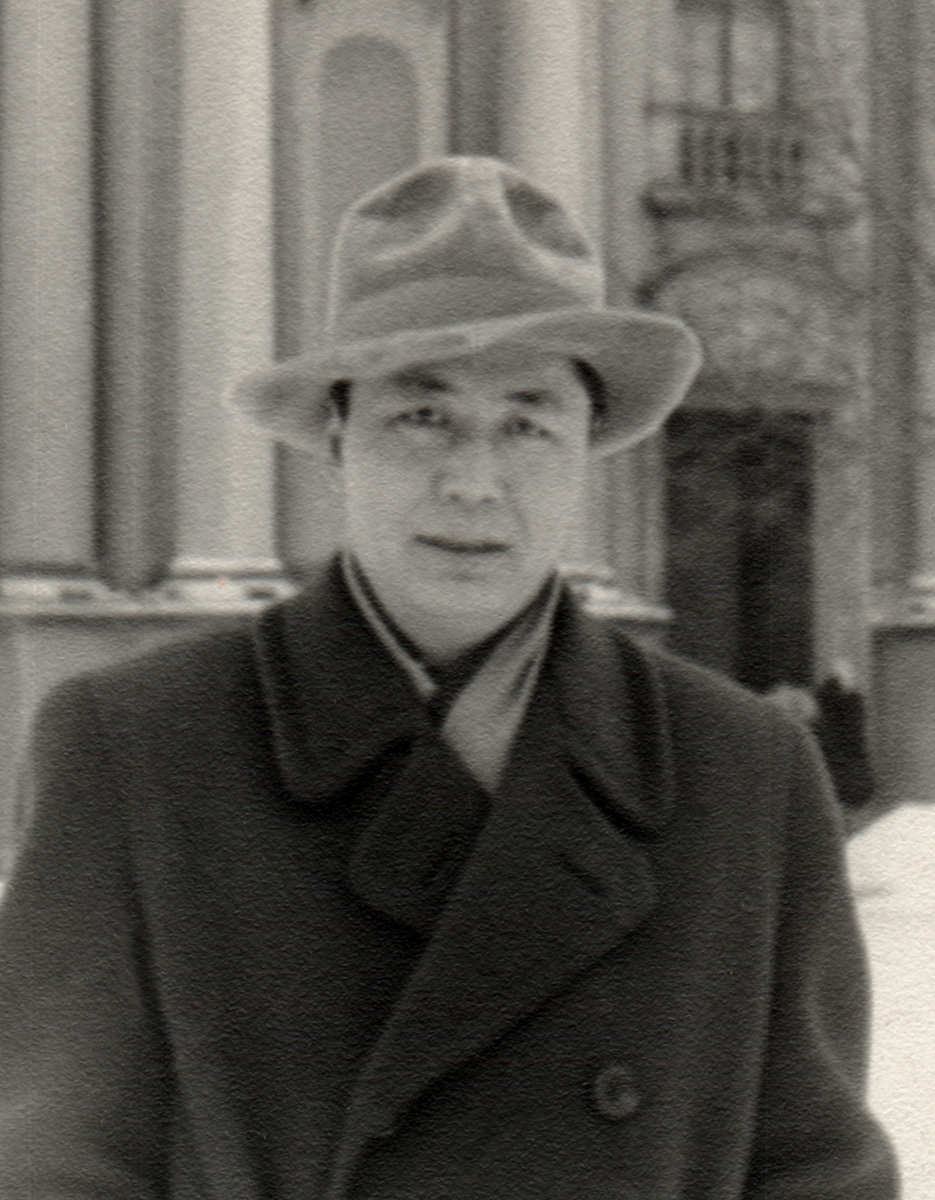
- Architect B. Dambiinyam, Moscow
- Born: July 15, 1924; Selenge Province, Mongolia
- Died: October 9, 2001 (aged 77); Ulaanbaatar, Mongolia
- Occupation: Architect
- Buildings: Ulaanbaatar: State Department Store facade; 'Urt Tsagaan' service district; Pioneer Palace pavilion; Vystavka Exhibition Center; 'Gutalyn 22' residential apartments; Bacteriological Institute; State Bank; Orphan Center and School; Mongolian National Chamber of Commerce; Chingeltei District Fire Station; Ministry of Geology, Mining, and Industry.

Bandiin Dambiinyam (Mongolian: Бандийн Дамбийням; July 15, 1924 – October 9, 2001) was a Mongolian architect.

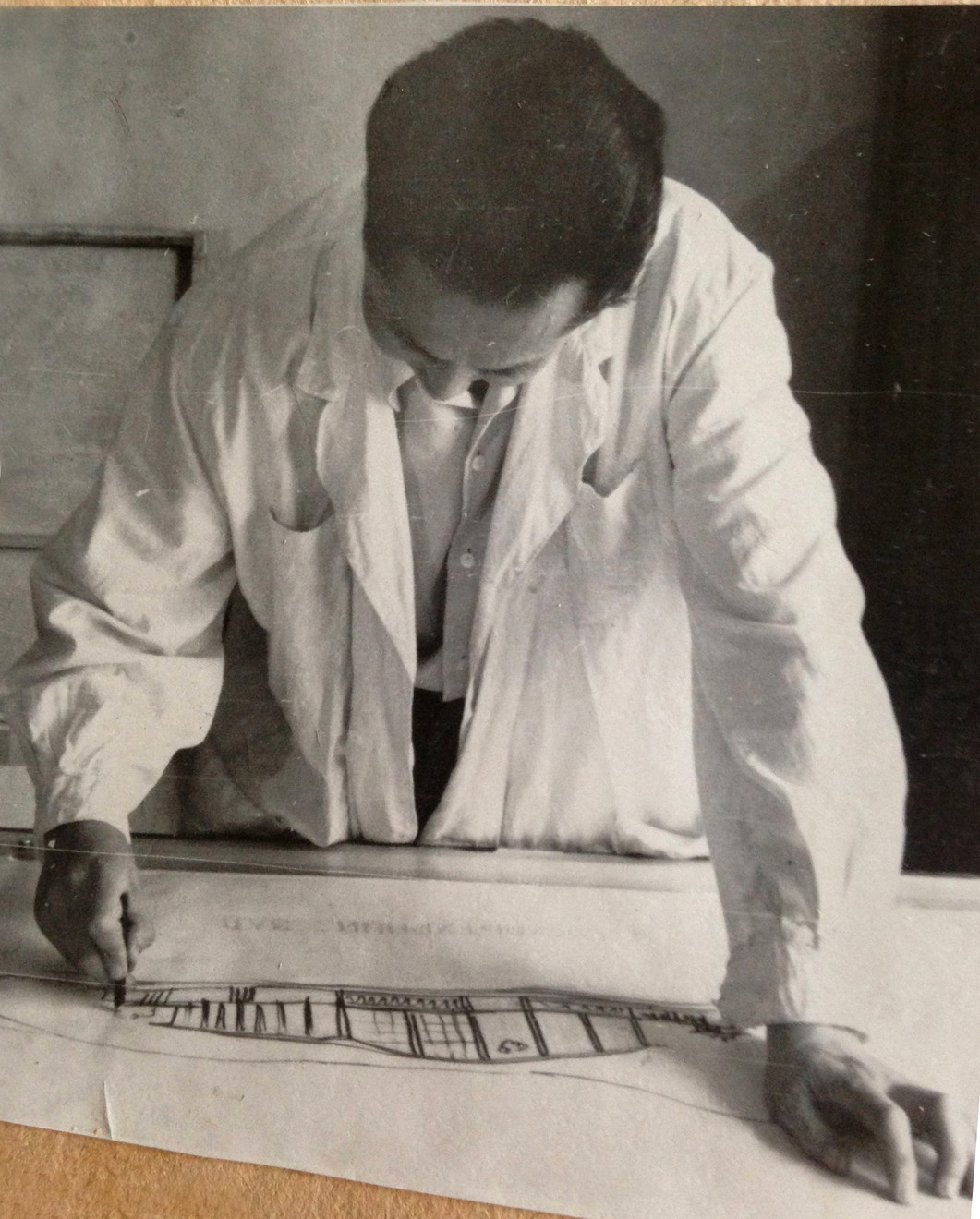

Throughout his long career as an architect, urban planner, and educator, B. Dambiinyam emphasized the use of design, architecture, and ongoing learning to enrich society, strengthen Mongolian identity and heritage, and support people's well-being through the spaces they lived and worked in.

Dambiinyam incorporated elements of traditional Mongolian design in his work, breaking from Soviet-influenced Socialist architecture of the time. Examples include the Urt Tsagaan commercial and service center; the pavilion for the Pioneer Palace; the B. Tserendorj monument; the State Bank building with its dome resembling the traditional Mongolian felt home, and the facades of the State Department Store, the Bacteriological Institute, and the "Gutalyn 22" mixed-used residential and commercial building and space.

Many of Dambiinyam's projects focused on public services such as the Orphan Center and School; the Ministry of Geology, Mining, and Industry; the Chingeltei District Fire Station; the Vystavka Exhibition Center; city halls; hotels; and health and wellness resorts throughout the Mongolian countryside.

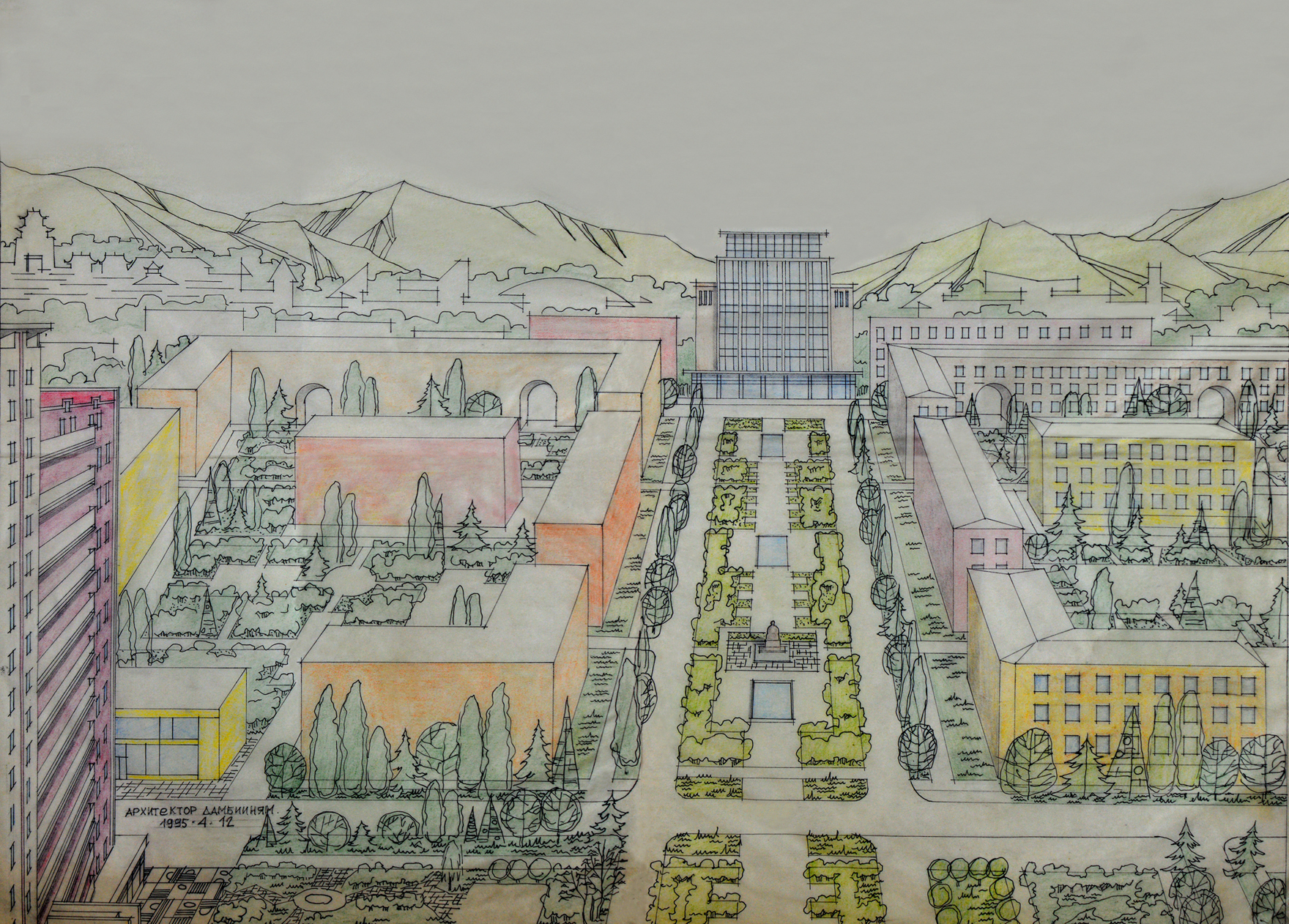
Architectural rendering of Prime Minister Tserendorj monument, Architect B. Dambiinyam.

In his 1971 article in the journal Arkhitektura, "Mongolian Architecture — Tradition and Present," Dambiinyam described Mongolia's architectural history as originating from the humble nomadic felt tent and its practical structural design, prefabricated components, extensive use of color, and harmonious integration with the natural landscape. With urban development gaining significant momentum in Mongolia in the 1960s and 70s, Dambiinyam championed avoiding the uniformity and monotony of standardized designs by revitalizing Mongolia's rich artistic traditions by integrating them appropriately with contemporary construction needs. He also called on present and future Mongolian architects to study Mongolia's architectural and artisitic heritage to preserve and highlight the uniquely Mongolian design within the context of new development. According to Dambiinyam, examples of Mongolia's architectural and artisitic heritage include Nogoon Ordon (Green Palace imperial winter residence), Choijin Lama Temple, and the monasteries of Erdene Zuu, Gandan Khiid, Amarbayasgalant Khiid, and Galbaiyn Gobi, with their defining characteristic of organic integration with the surrounding natural landscape.

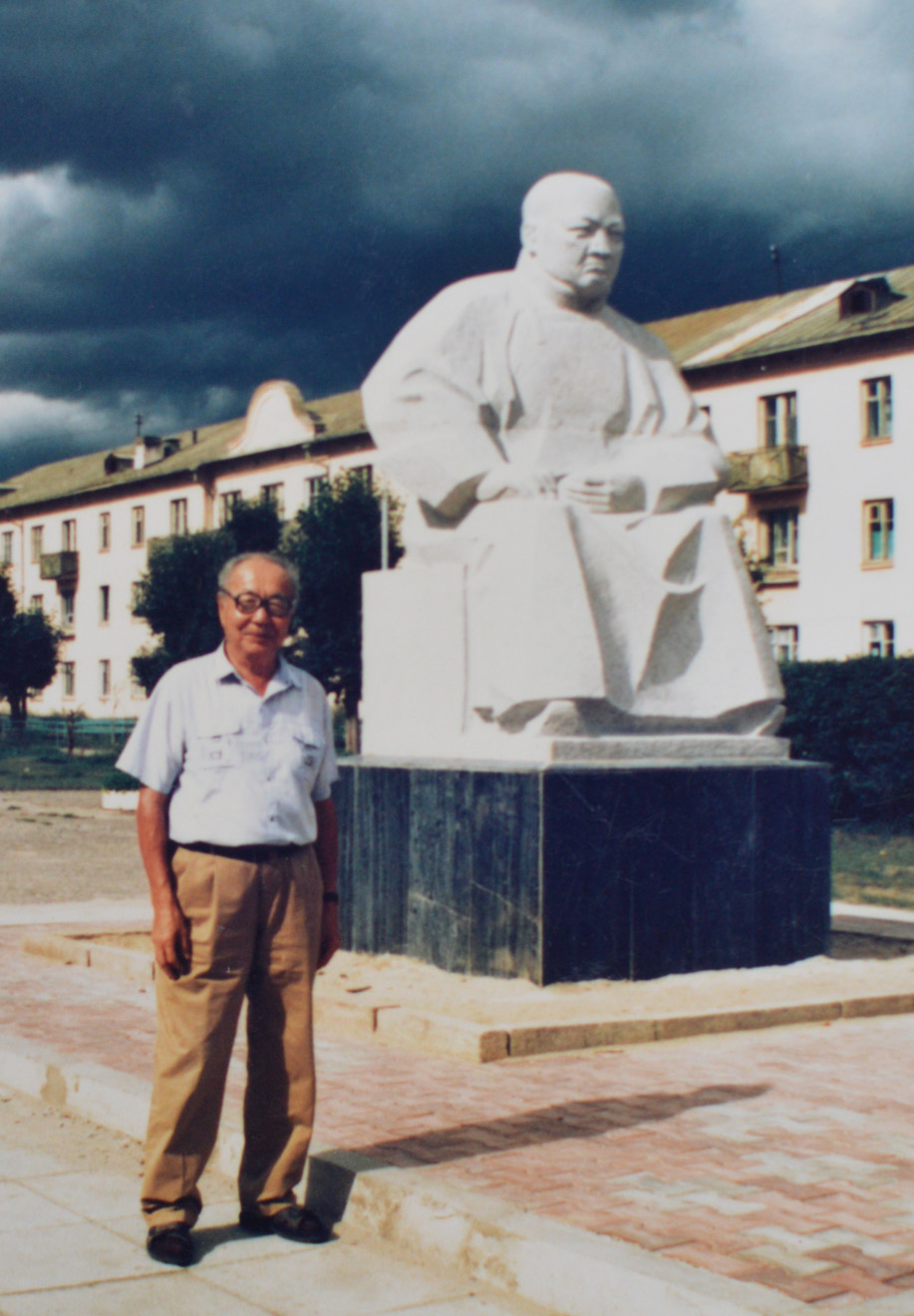
Architect B. Dambiinyam next to the B. Tserendorj monument he designed. Photo taken soon after completion of the project in July, 1998.

In a March 1982 interview, Dambiinyam described his participation in completing 150 buildings and urban plans for cities and towns across Mongolia as a collaborative effort. He mentioned some of the bigger projects he participated in up to 1982 as the Pioneer Palace buildings; the State Institute of Hygiene, Infection, and Bacteriology; the Central Fire Command; the Radiation Hospital; the Infectious Disease Hospital; the Songino Rest Center [a countryside sanatorium]; the Ulaanbaatar City Service Center (known as Urt Tsagaan or Long White); the Khovd Province Musical Drama Theater buildings; and others. Dambiinyam also shared his thoughts on what it took to be a successful architect:

To become an architect, one must first possess at least some aptitude for drawing. Furthermore, one needs to develop a keen sensitivity to one’s surroundings, the ability to constantly conceive new ideas, and the skill to make comparisons. To achieve this, one must read extensively and acquire a broad base of knowledge—in other words, one must continuously elevate one’s level of education. Most of our architects have mastered these skills. However, what we lack most is the quality of tireless, diligent hard work; I believe that only by cultivating this trait can one truly become a 'genuine' architect.

Архитектор болоход юуны түрүүнд бага ч гэсэн зураг зурах авьяас хэрэгтэй. Бас аливааг сонор соргогоор тусган авах мэдрэмж үргэлж шинийг бодож сэтгэж, харьцуулж сурах чадварыг эзэмших хэрэгтэй. Үүний тулд их ном уншиж их зүйл мэдэх ёстой. Өөрөө хэлбэл боловсролынхоо түвшинг дээшлүүлж байх шаардлагатай. Манай ихэнх архитекторууд дээрх чадваруудыг эзэмшсэн юм. Харин бидэнд хамгийн их дутагдаж байгаа зүйл бол уйгагүй хөдөлмөрч чанарыг эзэмшсэн цагт л 'жинхэнэ' архитектор болно гэж боддог.

— B. Dambiinyam, Beautiful Building — The Soul’s Decoration (1982)

1933-1941 Secondary school, Altanbulag, Selenge
1941-1946 Ministry of the Interior, Ulaanbaatar
1946-1956 Moscow Architectural Institute
1956-1957 Architect, City Planning, Ulaanbaatar
1956-1963 Founding Member, Union of Mongolian Architects
1957-1961 Director, Mongolian Architects Institute
1961-1967 Professor and Dean, Architecture, Mongolian State University, Ulaanbaatar
1967-1971 Director, Architectural Research Institute
1971-1984 Professor and Dean, Polytechnic University, Ulaanbaatar
1984-2001 Professor Emeritus, Mongolian State University, Ulaanbaatar
1984-2001 Architect Consultant, various projects

Architectural rendering of the Urt Tsagaan Service Center in Ulaanbaatar made by architect B. Dambiinyam.

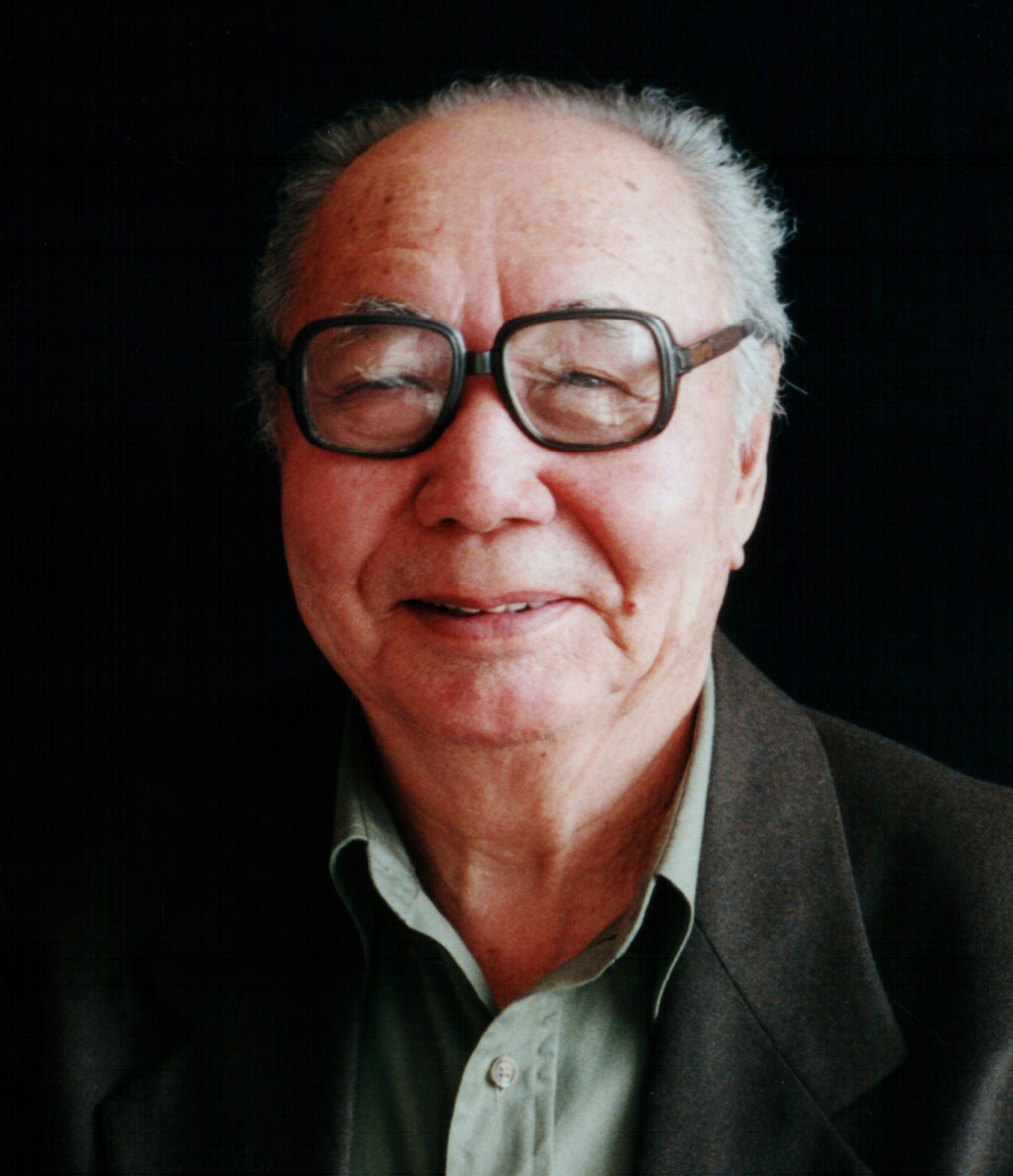
Architect B. Dambiinyam, San Diego, California, 2001
