= Museum of Govi-Altai Province =

Museum in Altai, Govi-Altai, Mongolia

- Говь-Алтай Aймгийн Mузей
- Established: 1967
- Location: Altai, Govi-Altai, Mongolia
- Coordinates: 46°22′29.9″N 96°15′39.2″E
- Type: museum
- Collection size: 2,537

The Museum of Govi-Altai Province (Mongolian: Говь-Алтай Aймгийн Mузей) is a museum in Altai City, Govi-Altai Province, Mongolia.

== History ==
The museum was originally established as the Local Studies Department in 1947. In 1967, it was transformed into a museum according to the resolution of the Ministry of Culture. In 1986, the museum established an exhibition hall named Ch.Lodoidamba.

== Architecture ==
The museum consists of the following exhibition halls, which are hall of minerals, nature-geography, history-ethnicity, religion, traditional crafts, patriots and Ch.Lodoidamba.

== Exhibitions ==
The museum has a total of 2,537 exhibits.
