= Gremix =

Mongolian YouTuber (born 1996)

Ganbayar
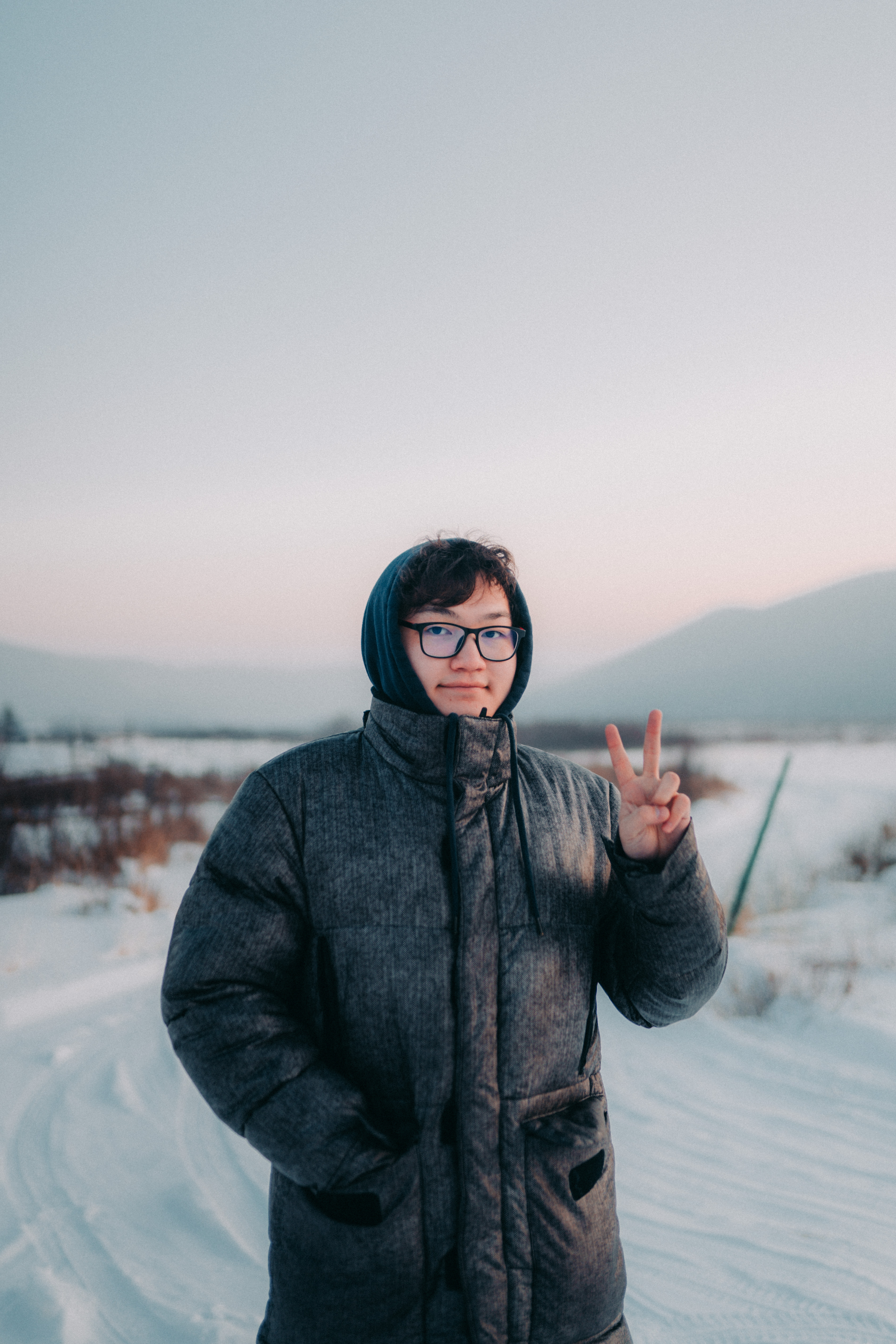
- Ganbayar in 2019
- Born: Ganbayar Maambayar; 16 May 1996 (age 30); Ulaanbaatar, Mongolia
- Occupations: YouTuber; Actor; Entrepreneur
- Height: 5'10

YouTube information
- Channel: Gremix
- Years active: 2014–present
- Genres: Gaming; Comedy; Reaction video; Vlog
- Subscribers: 1.6 million
- Views: 642 million views
- Last updated: 19 February 2026

Ganbayar Maambayar (born 16 May 1996), better known online as Gremix, is a Mongolian YouTuber, actor, and entrepreneur. Known primarily for his highly energetic, comedic video game commentaries and vlogs, he is considered a pioneer in the Mongolian digital space. As of February 2026, his main channel boasts over 1.52 million subscribers and nearly 600 million views, making it the most-subscribed and most-watched channel in Mongolia. He is also the very first Mongolian YouTube creator to be awarded the Golden Play Button.

== Early life and education ==
Ganbayar was born on 16 May 1996 in Ulaanbaatar, Mongolia. As the only son in his family, he spent much of his childhood living with his grandparents while his parents worked abroad. He attended the 84th Secondary School in Ulaanbaatar, graduating in 2013. Following high school, he pursued a degree in IT Engineering at the Mongolian University of Science and Technology (MUST), successfully completing his studies in 2017.

== Internet career ==
=== The YouTube grind (2014–2019) ===
While still navigating university life in 2014, Ganbayar began uploading gameplay videos to YouTube. The Mongolian creator community was practically non-existent at the time, but he kept grinding. Slowly, he built a dedicated audience drawn to his raw, humorous reactions while playing horror and survival video games. After graduating from university, he took the leap to make YouTube his full-time career. His dedication paid off when he earned the YouTube Silver Play Button in July 2018, marking a massive milestone not just for him, but for Mongolian internet culture.

=== Expansion and secondary channels (2019–present) ===
As his main channel evolved into vlogs and real-life comedy sketches, Ganbayar didn't abandon his gaming roots. He launched a secondary channel, Gremix Gaming, dedicated entirely to gaming content (such as Minecraft, Five Nights at Freddy's, and Poppy Playtime). As of 2026, this second channel alone sits at nearly 900,000 subscribers with over 233 million views, a massive feat in the local market. He also occasionally dips into actual esports, notably participating in a CS:GO 5E Arena Streamer Battle Asia tournament in 2022.

== Acting and music ==
Stepping outside the YouTube bubble, Ganbayar took a swing at acting. In 2018, he debuted on the big screen in the Mongolian comedy film ORK, and kept the momentum going in 2019 by starring in The Last Monita and I Won't Become a Grandma.

In January 2020, he dropped his first single, "Huiten baina" (It's Cold). Though he made it as a sarcastic, fun track for his audience, it unironically went viral and actually charted on the iTunes Mongolia Top 100.

== Business ventures and gaming ==
=== Gremmy's Chest ===
Taking his brand physical, Ganbayar opened his own retail store, Gremmy's Chest, on 2 February 2024. The shop specialized in curated toys, gadgets, and anime collectibles for his young fanbase. It originally launched as a flagship store in Ulaanbaatar's State Department Store (UID). However, keeping things fresh, reports in early 2026 revealed he was closing the UID location to upgrade and relocate. The new, modernized Gremmy's Chest is slated to open in the "Little Venice" entertainment district at the Misheel Expo complex.

=== Gremix Blockverse ===
Merging his physical products with his digital world, he teamed up with AR Mongolia (Argun) to release Gremix Blockverse (or Gremix AR). It is an augmented reality puzzle game connected to physical 3D merchandise. Players navigate a blocky digital world to save a virtual Gremix from an evil AI clone. It stood out as one of the first major creator-driven AR products in Mongolia.
