= Chandmani, Govi-Altai =

District in Govi-Altai Province, Mongolia

Chandmani District Чандмань сум ᠴᠢᠨᠳᠠᠮᠠᠨᠢᠰᠤᠮᠤ
- District
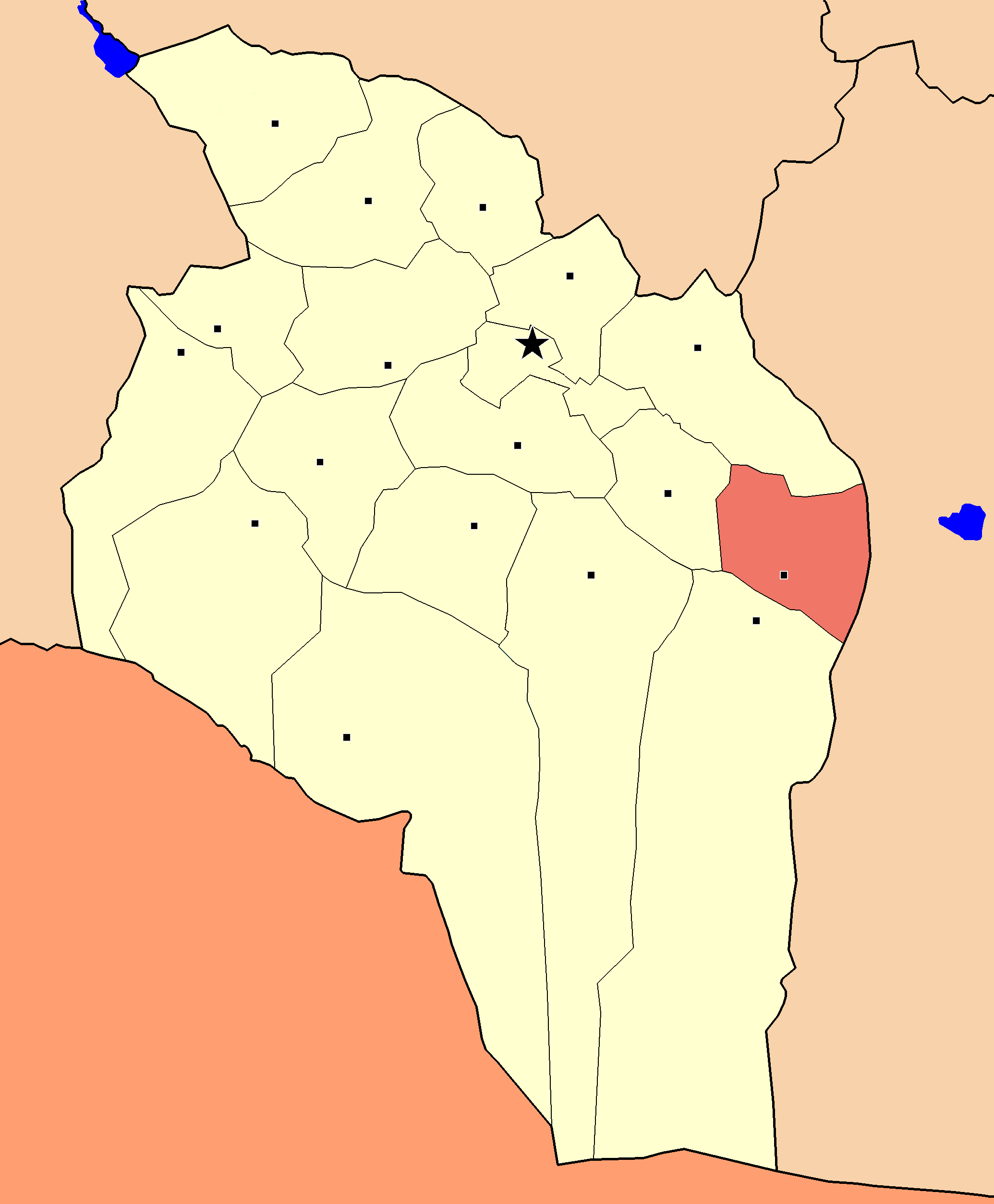
- Chandmani District in Govi-Altai Province

- Location within Mongolia
- Coordinates: 45°20′03″N 97°59′19″E
- Country: Mongolia
- Province: Govi-Altai Province

Area
  - Total: 4,629 km^{2} (1,787 sq mi)
- Time zone: UTC+8 (UTC + 8)

Chandmani (Mongolian: Чандмань, jewel, also Chandman) is a sum (district) of the Govi-Altai Province in western Mongolia. In 2009, its population was 2,053.

== Administrative divisions ==
The district is divided into four bags, which are:

- Chandmani-Uul
- Erdene-Uul
- Khurkhree
- Taliin shand
- Ulziibulag

== Economy ==
- Zeegt Coal Mine
