= Tseel, Govi-Altai =

District in Govi-Altai Province, Mongolia

Coordinates: 45°33′55″N 95°52′00″E

Tseel District Цээл сум ᠴᠡᠭᠡᠯᠰᠤᠮᠤ
- District
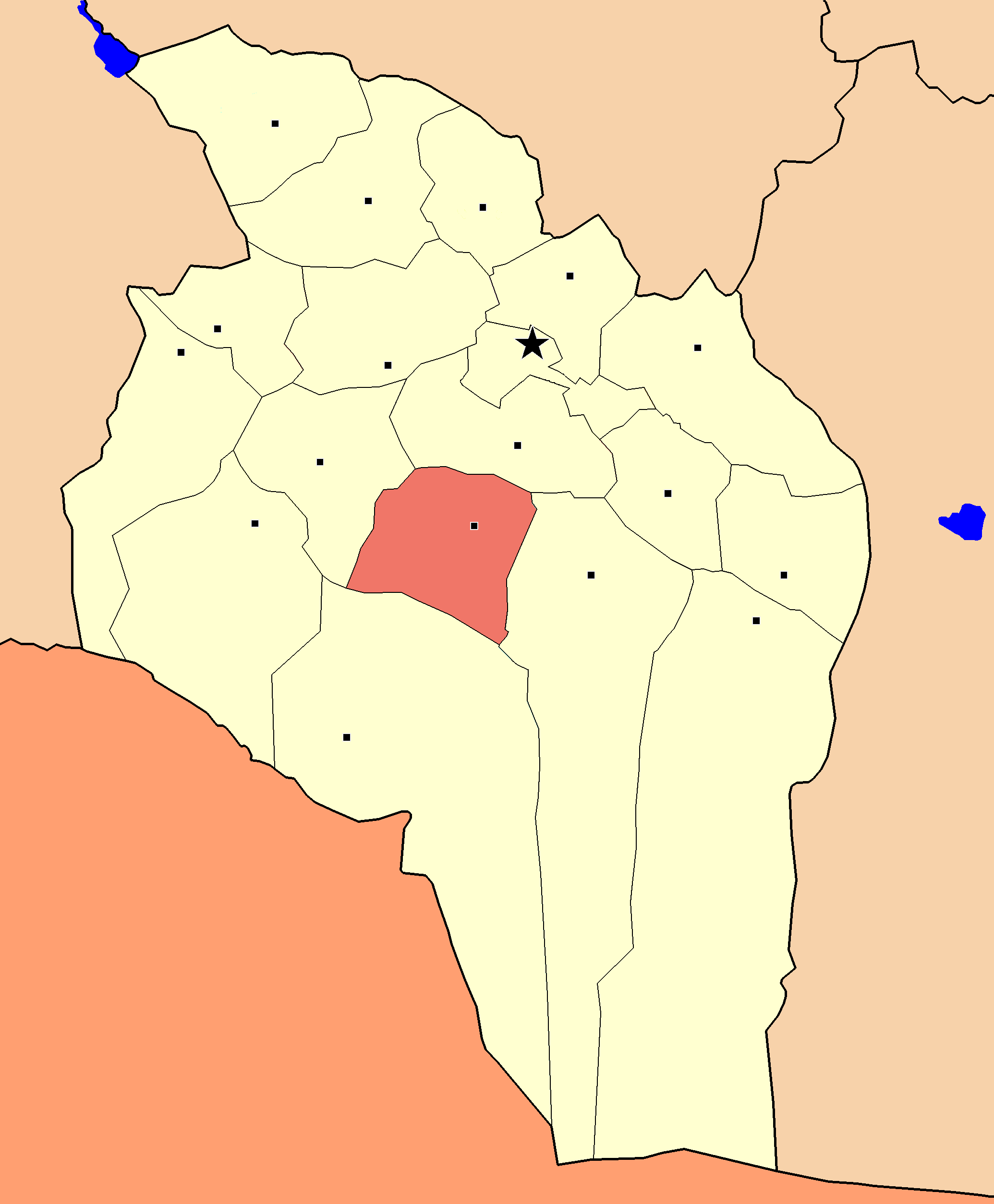
- Tseel District in Govi-Altai Province
- Country: Mongolia
- Province: Govi-Altai Province

Area
  - Total: 5,631 km^{2} (2,174 sq mi)
- Time zone: UTC+8 (UTC + 8)

Tseel (Mongolian: Цээл) is a sum (district) of Govi-Altai Province in western Mongolia. In 2009, its population was 2,038.

== Administrative divisions ==
The district is divided into four bags, which are:

- Bayangol
- Buren
- Derstei
- Jargalt

== Mining ==
- Tayan Nuur mine, an open-pit iron ore mining project
