= Khökh morit, Govi-Altai =

District in Govi-Altai Province, Mongolia

Coordinates: 47°21′26″N 94°31′27″E

Khökh morit District Хөхморьт сум ᠬᠥᠬᠡᠮᠣᠷᠢᠲᠤᠰᠤᠮᠤ
- District
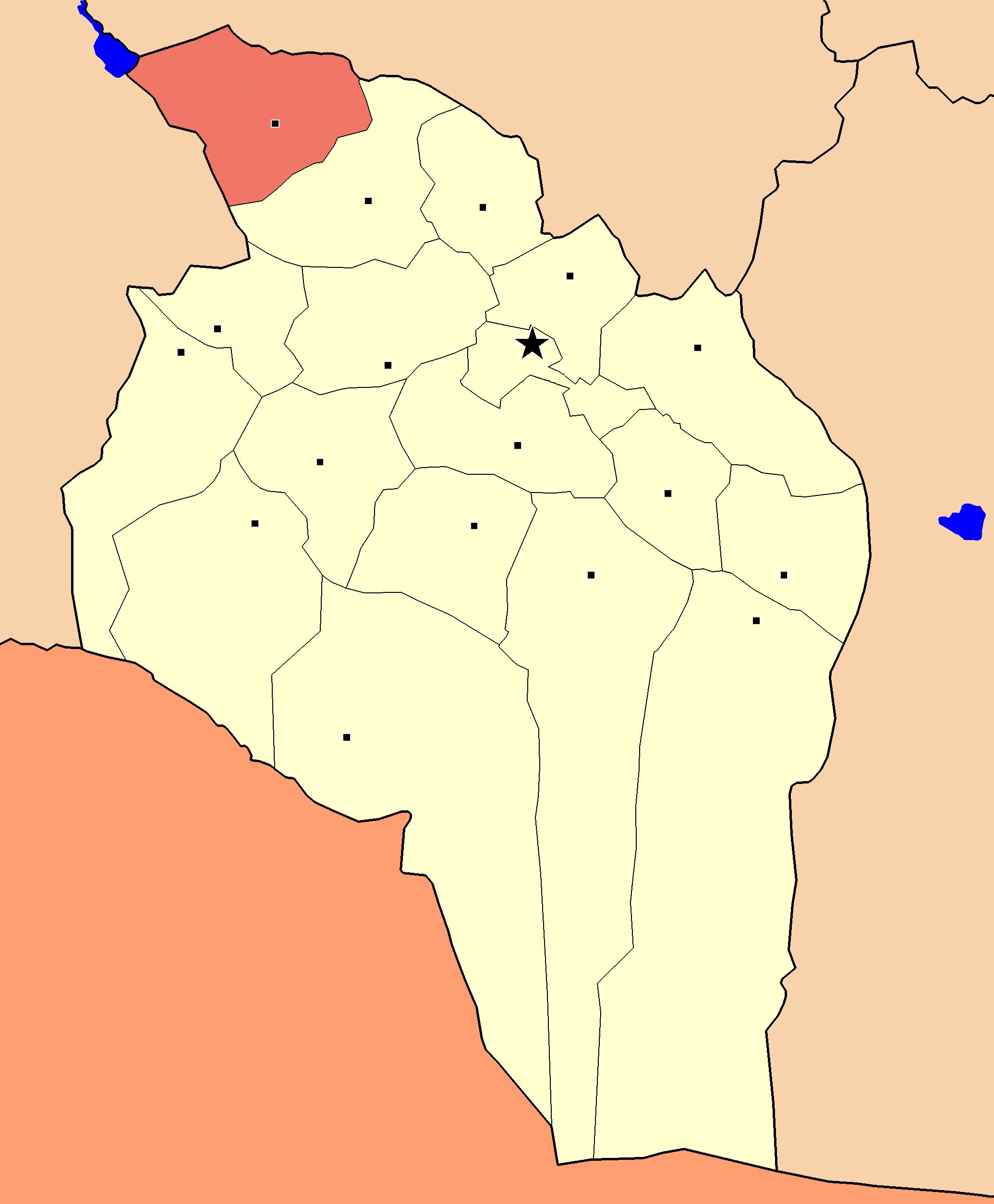
- Khökh morit District in Govi-Altai Province
- Country: Mongolia
- Province: Govi-Altai Province

Area
  - Total: 6,314 km^{2} (2,438 sq mi)
- Time zone: UTC+8 (UTC + 8)

Khökh morit (Mongolian: Хөх морьт, also Khökh mor't, Blue horse) is a sum (district) of Govi-Altai Province in western Mongolia. In 2009, its population was 2,461.

== Administrative divisions ==
The district is divided into five bags, which are:

- Khuisiin govi
- Sain-Ust
- Sangiin dalai
- Tsookhor
- Zavkhan gol
