= Khaliun, Govi-Altai =

District in Govi-Altai Province, Mongolia

Coordinates: 45°55′45″N 96°09′48″E

Khaliun District Халиун сум ᠬᠠᠯᠢᠭᠤᠨᠰᠤᠮᠤ
- District
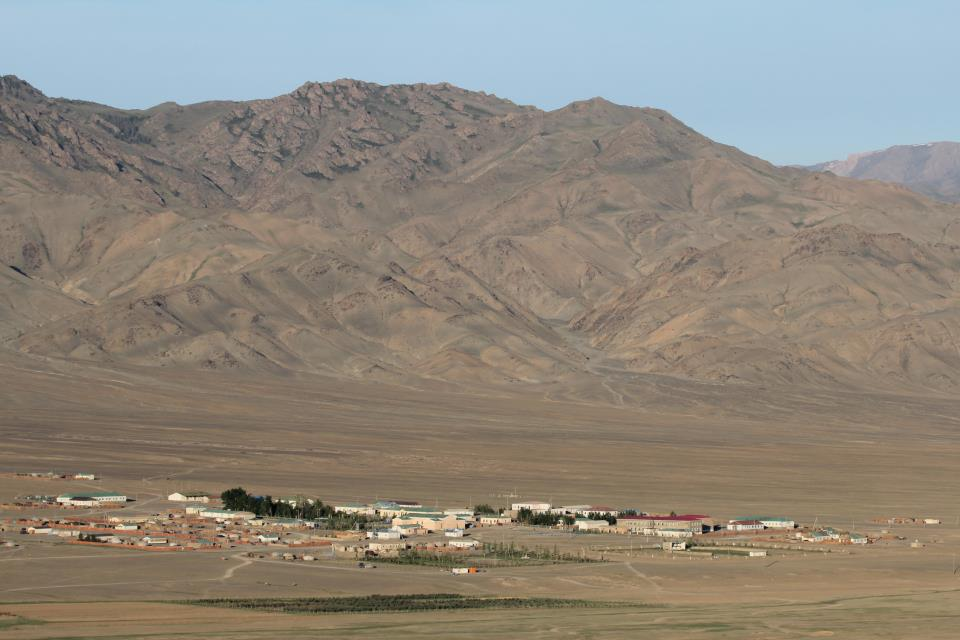

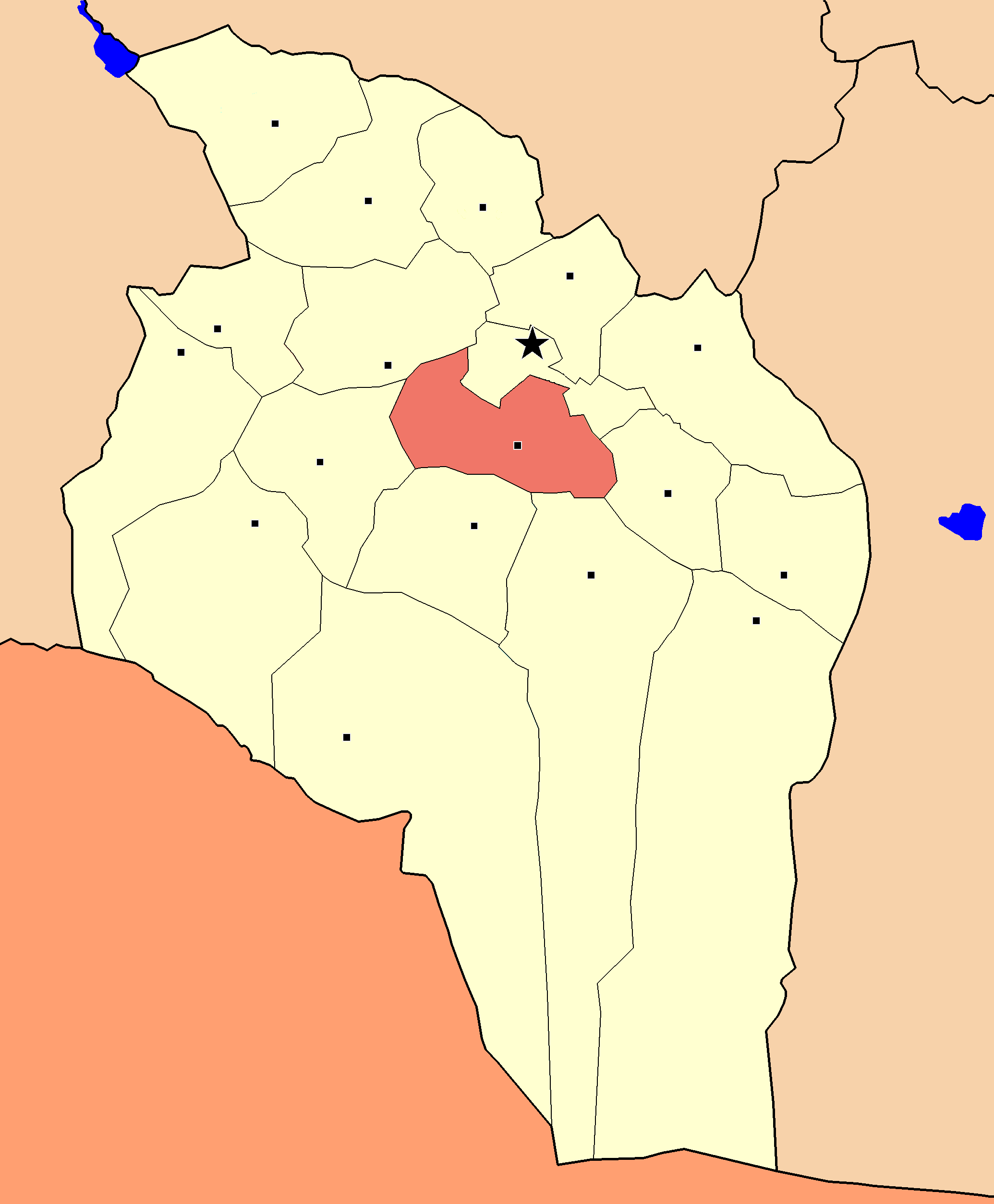
- Khaliun District in Govi-Altai Province
- Country: Mongolia
- Province: Govi-Altai Province

Area
  - Total: 4,214 km^{2} (1,627 sq mi)
- Time zone: UTC+8 (UTC + 8)

Khaliun (Mongolian: Халиун, dun) is a sum (district) of Govi-Altai Province in western Mongolia. In 2009, its population was 2,497.

== Administrative divisions ==
The district is divided into four bags, which are:

- Chatsran
- Guu bariach
- Olon bulag
- Suuj

== Notable natives ==
- Shagalyn Jadambaa, military leader and former Minister of Defense
