= Tögrög, Govi-Altai =

District in Govi-Altai Province, Mongolia

Coordinates: 45°49′35″N 94°49′04″E

Tögrög District Төгрөг сум ᠲᠦᠭᠦᠷᠢᠭᠰᠤᠮᠤ
- District
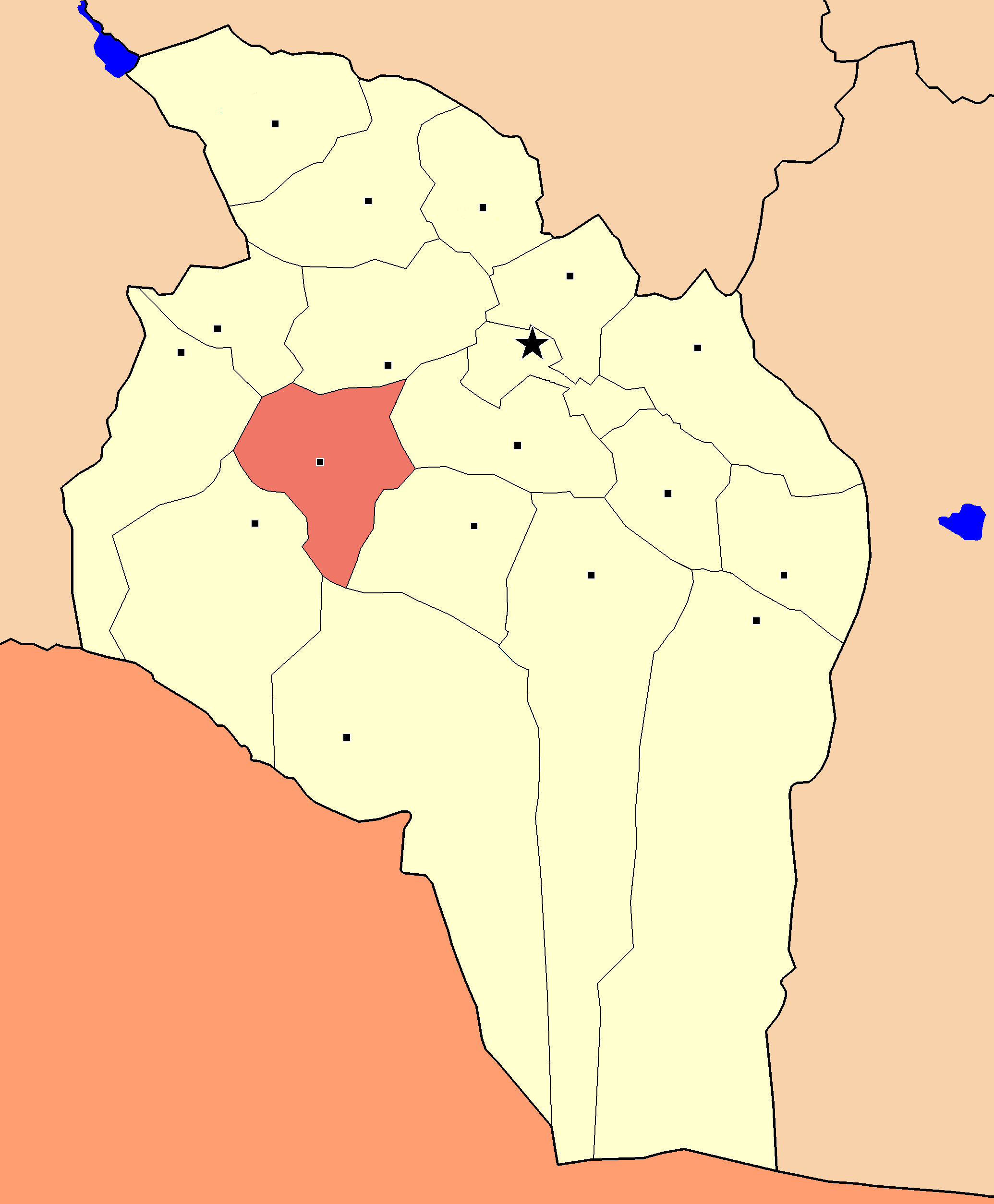
- Tögrög District in Govi-Altai Province
- Country: Mongolia
- Province: Govi-Altai Province

Area
  - Total: 5,343 km^{2} (2,063 sq mi)
- Time zone: UTC+8 (UTC + 8)

Tögrög (Mongolian: Төгрөг) is a sum (district) of Govi-Altai Province in western Mongolia. Center of Tugrug sum located from Altai city in 145 km. In 2009, its population was 1,914.

== Administrative divisions ==
The district is divided into five bags, which are:

- Khuren gol
- Maanit
- Tsagaan khairkhan
- Tungalag
- Tugrugiin ekh
