= Altai, Govi-Altai =

District in Govi-Altai Province, Mongolia

Coordinates: 44°37′06″N 94°55′09″E

Altai District Алтай сум ᠠᠯᠲᠠᠢᠰᠤᠮᠤ
- District
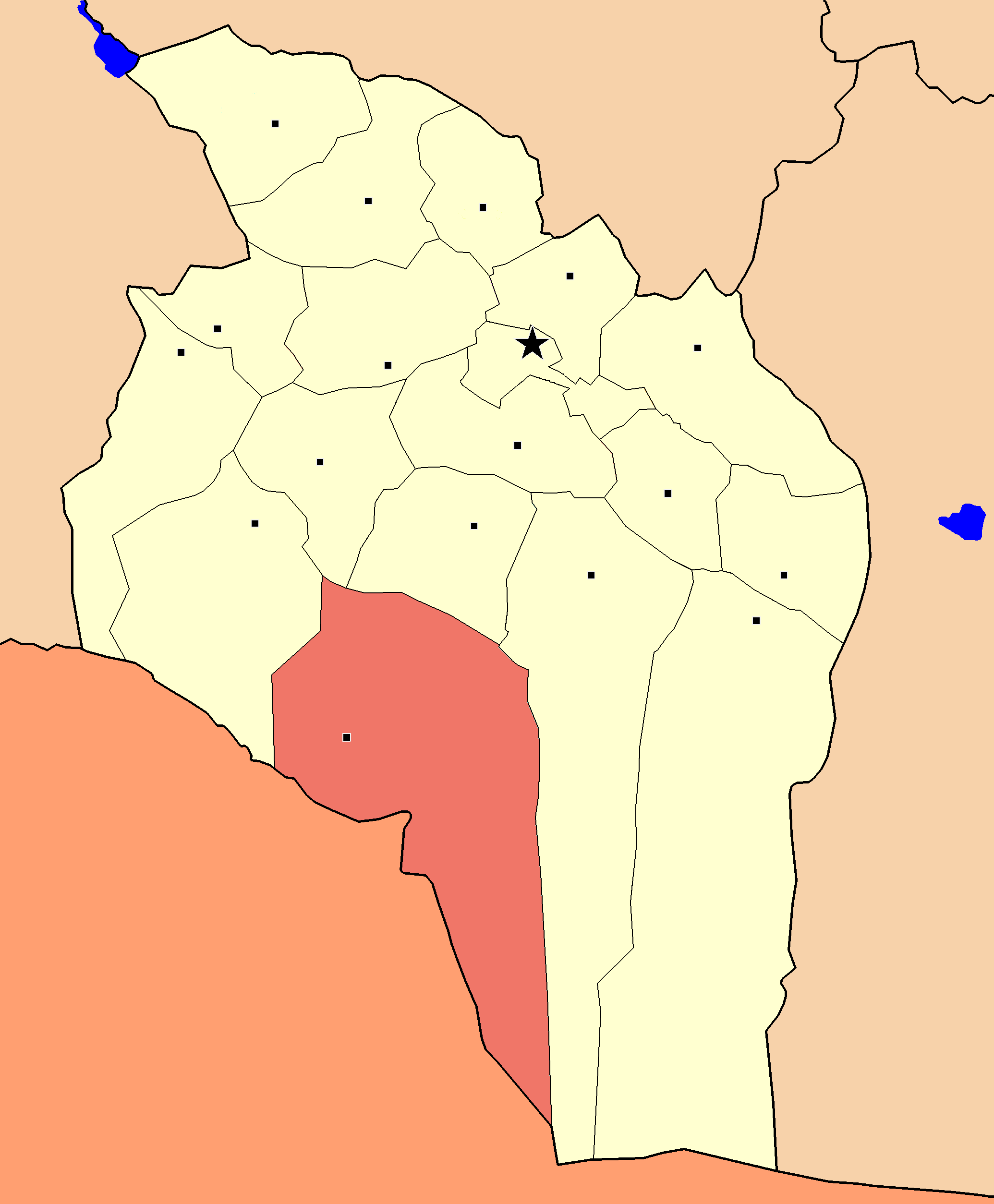
- Altai District in Govi-Altai Province
- Country: Mongolia
- Province: Govi-Altai Province

Area
  - Total: 20,256 km^{2} (7,821 sq mi)
- Time zone: UTC+8 (UTC + 8)

Altai (Mongolian: Алтай) is a sum (district) of Govi-Altai Aimag (province) in western Mongolia. It is located in the south of the aimag, and is not to be confused with the aimag capital, which is also named Altai, but located in the Yesönbulag sum.

Wolves are a problem in the district, and in 2001 the local government approved a wolf hunting contest, which as of 2003 had killed 56 adult wolves and 40 cubs. The government also encourages well digging in the district and runs a contest.

== Administrative divisions ==
The district is divided into four bags, which are:

- Badral
- Bayan-Ovoo
- Bayantsagaan
- Urt

== Infrastructure ==
The district is interconnected to the electrical grid of China through 35 kV overhead power line. The construction of the project was completed in 2024 and the interconnection was done on 25 December 2025.
