= Jargalan, Govi-Altai =

District in Govi-Altai Province, Mongolia

Coordinates: 46°58′41″N 95°55′32″E

Jargalan District Жаргалан сум ᠵᠢᠷᠭᠠᠯᠠᠩᠰᠤᠮᠤ
- District
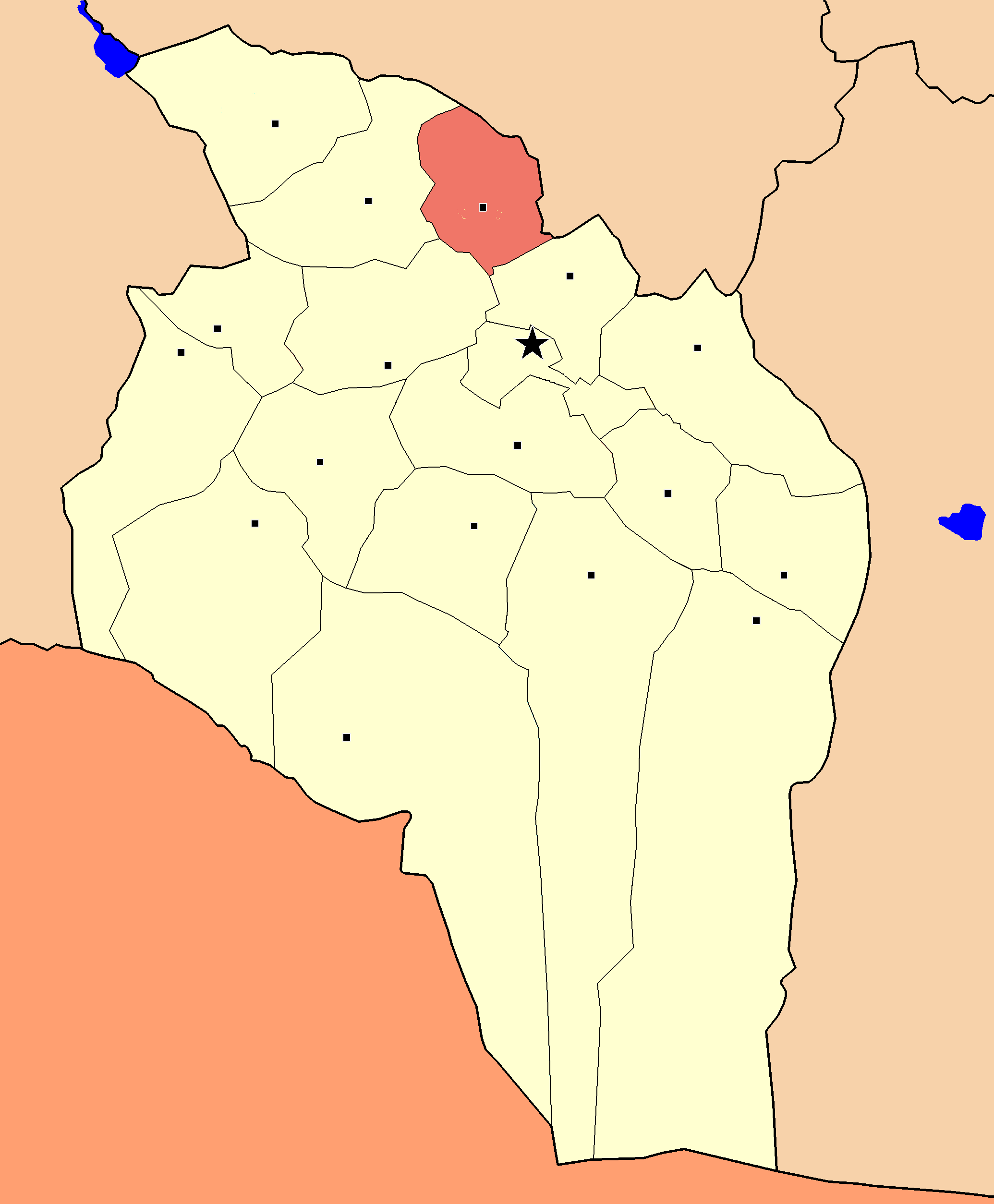
- Jargalan District in Govi-Altai Province
- Country: Mongolia
- Province: Govi-Altai Province

Area
  - Total: 3,683 km^{2} (1,422 sq mi)
- Time zone: UTC+8 (UTC + 8)

Jargalan (Mongolian: жаргалан, "Happiness") is a sum (district) of Govi-Altai Province in western Mongolia. In 2009, its population was 1,904.

== Administrative divisions ==
The district is divided into three bags, which are:

- Buren
- Teel
- Zavkhan Gol
