= Biger, Govi-Altai =

District in Govi-Altai Province, Mongolia

Coordinates: 45°42′32″N 97°10′34″E

Biger District Бигэр сум ᠪᠢᠭᠡᠷᠰᠤᠮᠤ
- District
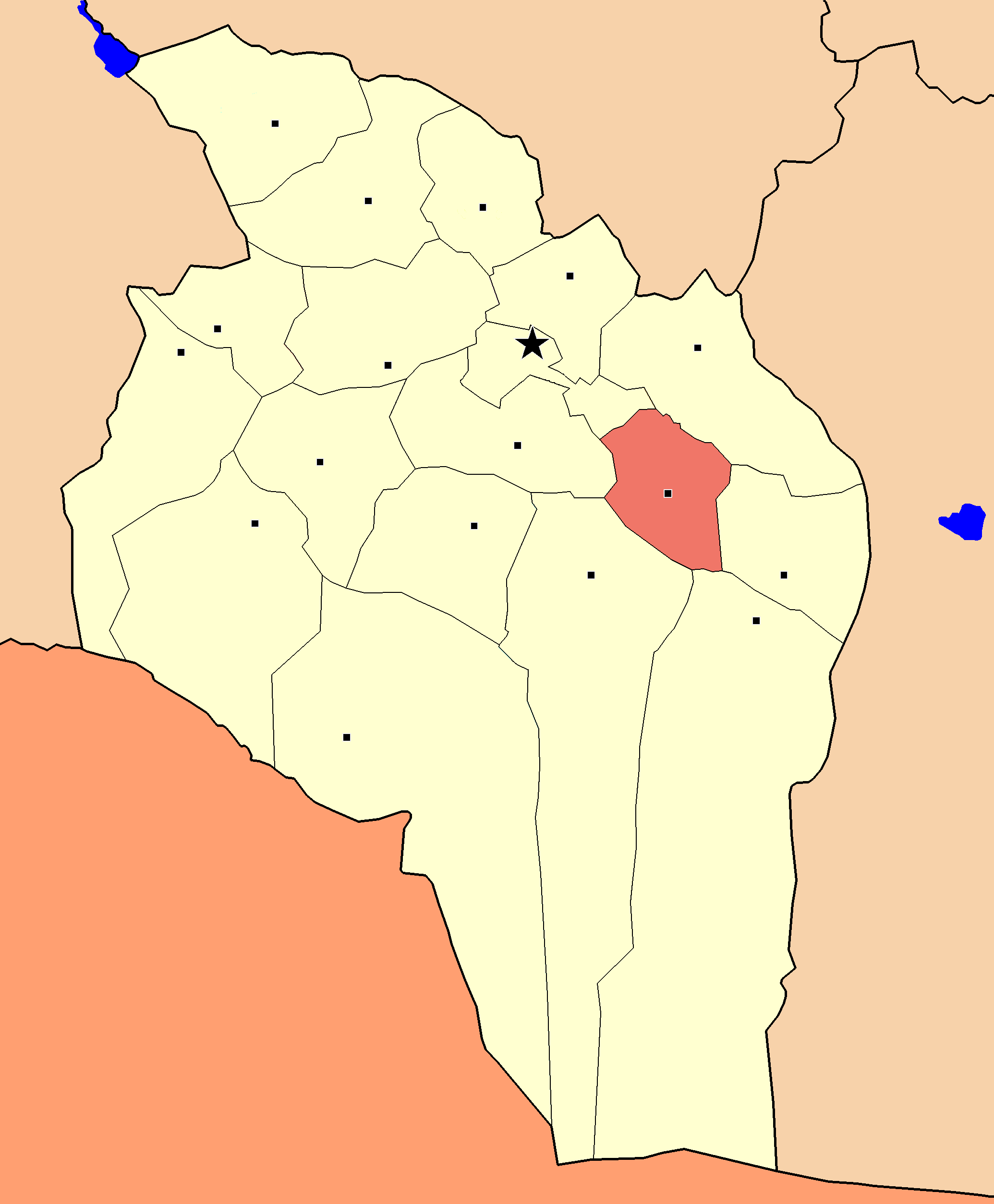
- Biger District in Govi-Altai Province
- Country: Mongolia
- Province: Govi-Altai Province

Area
  - Total: 3,826 km^{2} (1,477 sq mi)
- Time zone: UTC+8 (UTC + 8)

Biger (Mongolian: Бигэр) is a sum (district) of Govi-Altai Province in western Mongolia. In 2009, its population was 2,197.

== Administrative divisions ==
The district is divided into five bags, which are:

- Buudai
- Ikh bulag
- Khuremt
- Myangai
- Urt
