= Bugat, Govi-Altai =

District in Govi-Altai Province, Mongolia

Coordinates: 45°33′21″N 94°21′53″E

Bugat District Бугат сум ᠪᠤᠭᠠᠲᠤᠰᠤᠮᠤ
- District
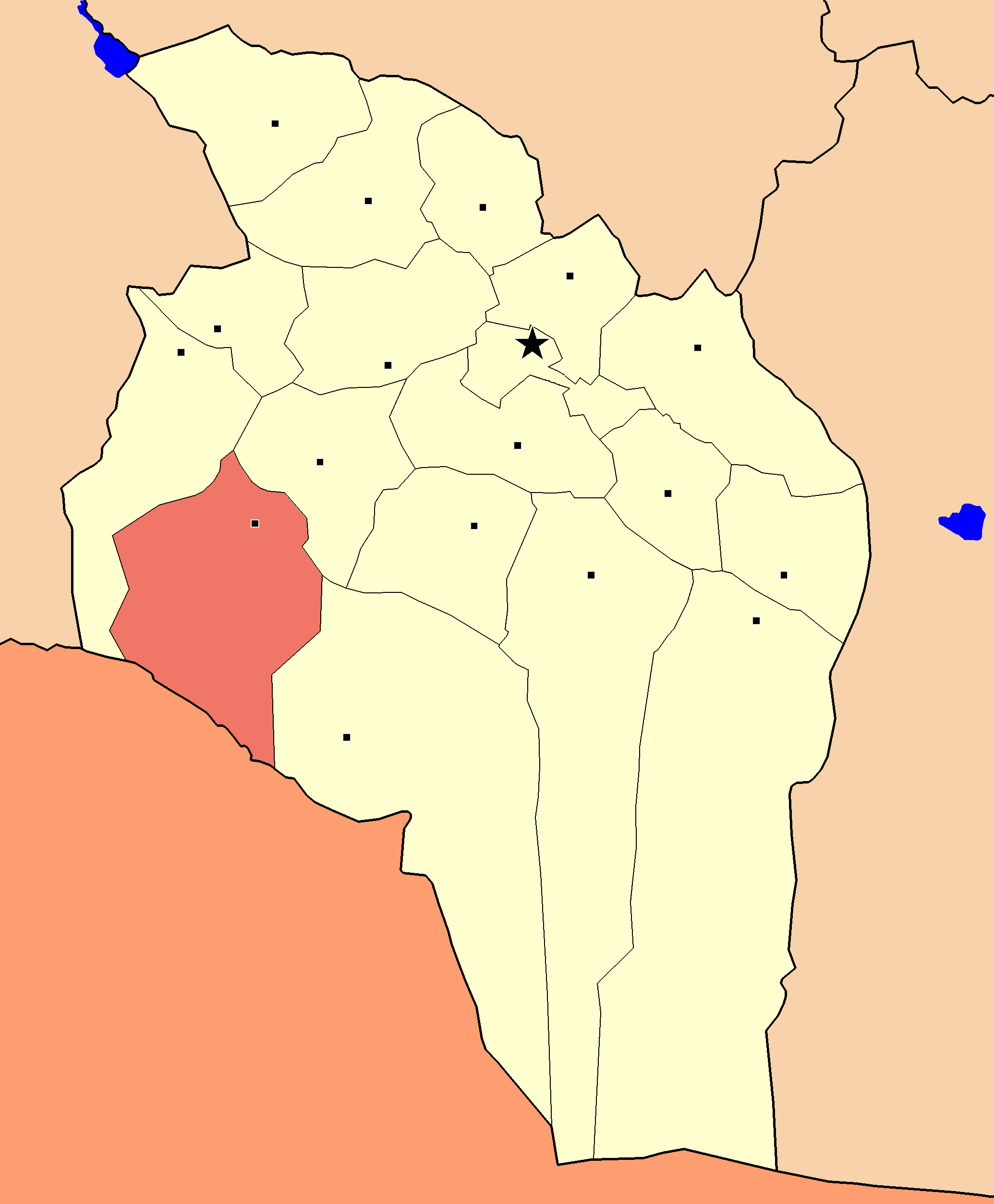
- Bugat District in Govi-Altai Province
- Country: Mongolia
- Province: Govi-Altai Province

Area
  - Total: 9,921 km^{2} (3,831 sq mi)
- Time zone: UTC+8 (UTC + 8)

Bugat (Mongolian: Бугат "deer") is a sum (district) of Govi-Altai Province in western Mongolia. It is named after Buga Khairkhan Mountain, a local sacred peak. In 2009, its population was 2,257.

Bugat was the birthplace of Puntsagiin Jasrai, Prime Minister of Mongolia from 1992 to 1996.

== Administrative divisions ==
The district is divided into five bags, which are:

- Bayangol
- Bij
- Fyerm
- Gakhainch
- Suj
