= Bayan-Uul, Govi-Altai =

District in Govi-Altai Province, Mongolia

Coordinates: 46°59′34″N 95°12′01″E

Bayan-Uul District Баян-Уул сум ᠪᠠᠶ᠋ᠠᠨᠠᠭᠤᠯᠠᠰᠤᠮᠤ
- District
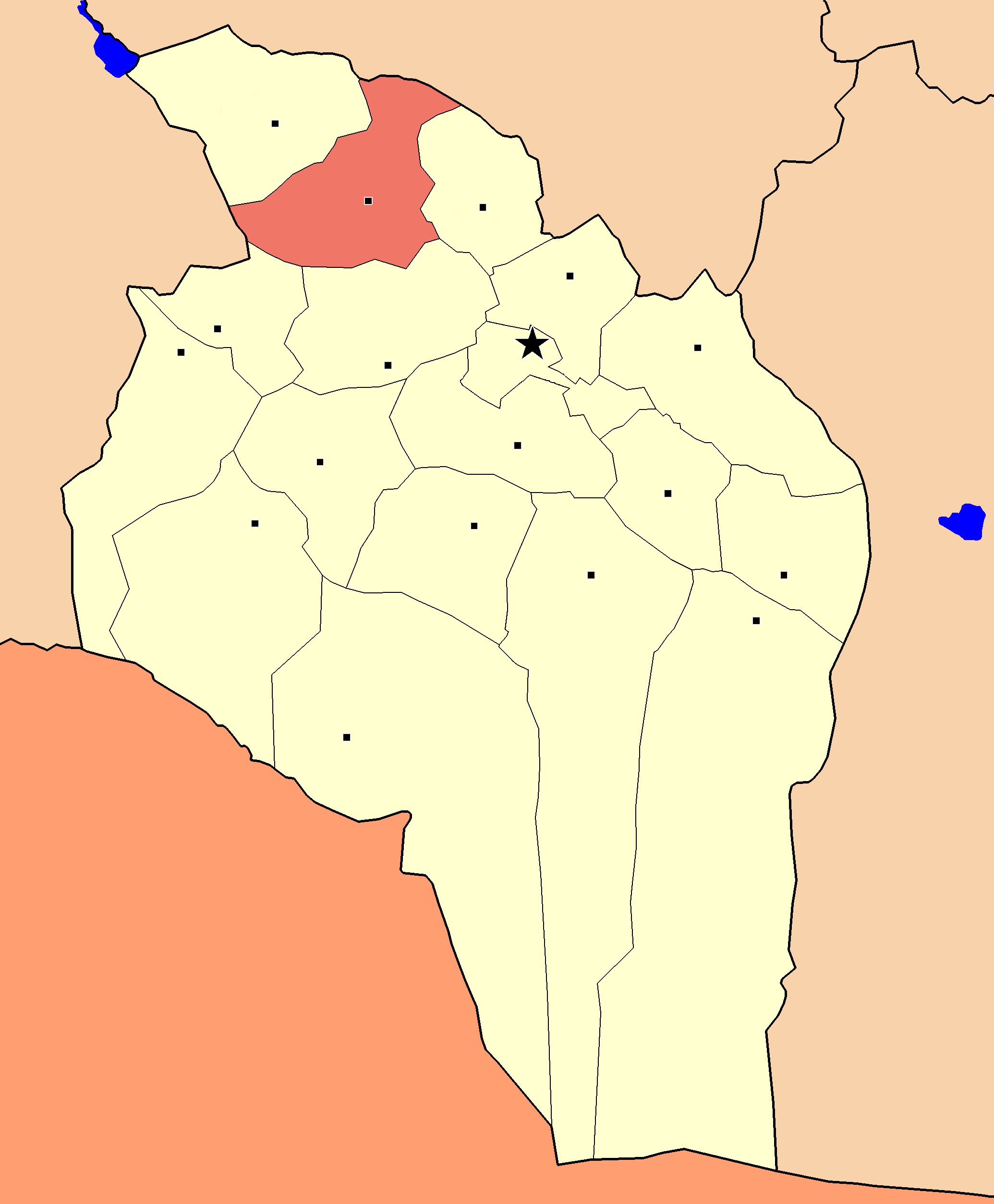
- Bayan-Uul District in Govi-Altai Province
- Country: Mongolia
- Province: Govi-Altai Province

Area
  - Total: 5,836 km^{2} (2,253 sq mi)
- Time zone: UTC+8 (UTC + 8)

Bayan-Uul (Mongolian: Баян-Уул, Rich mountain) is a sum (district) of Govi-Altai Province in western Mongolia. In 2009, its population was 2,943.

== Administrative divisions ==
The district is divided into six bags, which are:

- Altangadas
- Bayan bogd
- Bayangovi
- Bayankhairkhan
- Chandmani Khairkhan
- Khuisiin Govi
