= Tonkhil, Govi-Altai =

District in Govi-Altai Province, Mongolia

Coordinates: 46°18′32″N 93°54′12″E

Tonkhil District Тонхил сум ᠲᠣᠩᠬᠢᠯᠰᠤᠮᠤ
- District
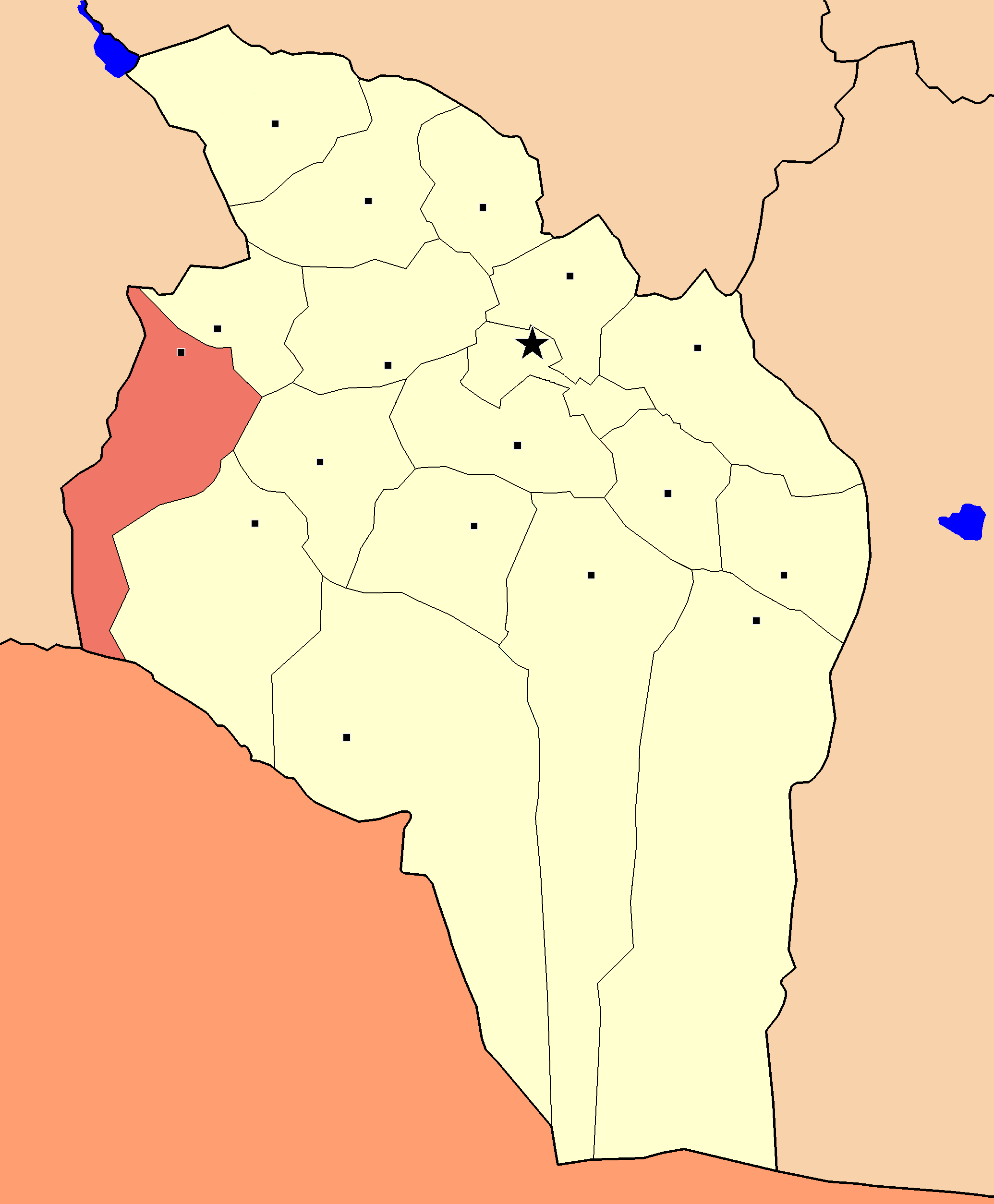
- Tonkhil District in Govi-Altai Province
- Country: Mongolia
- Province: Govi-Altai Province

Area
  - Total: 7,322 km^{2} (2,827 sq mi)
- Time zone: UTC+8 (UTC + 8)

Tonkhil (Mongolian: Тонхил) is a sum (district) of Govi-Altai Province in western Mongolia. In 2009, its population was 2,402.

== Administrative divisions ==
The district is divided into five bags, which are:

- Altain-Orgil
- Altansoyombo
- Bus-Uul
- Tamch
- Zuil
