= Erdene, Govi-Altai =

District in Govi-Altai Province, Mongolia

Coordinates: 45°09′42″N 97°42′23″E

Erdene District Эрдэнэ сум ᠡᠷᠳᠡᠨᠢᠰᠤᠮᠤ
- District
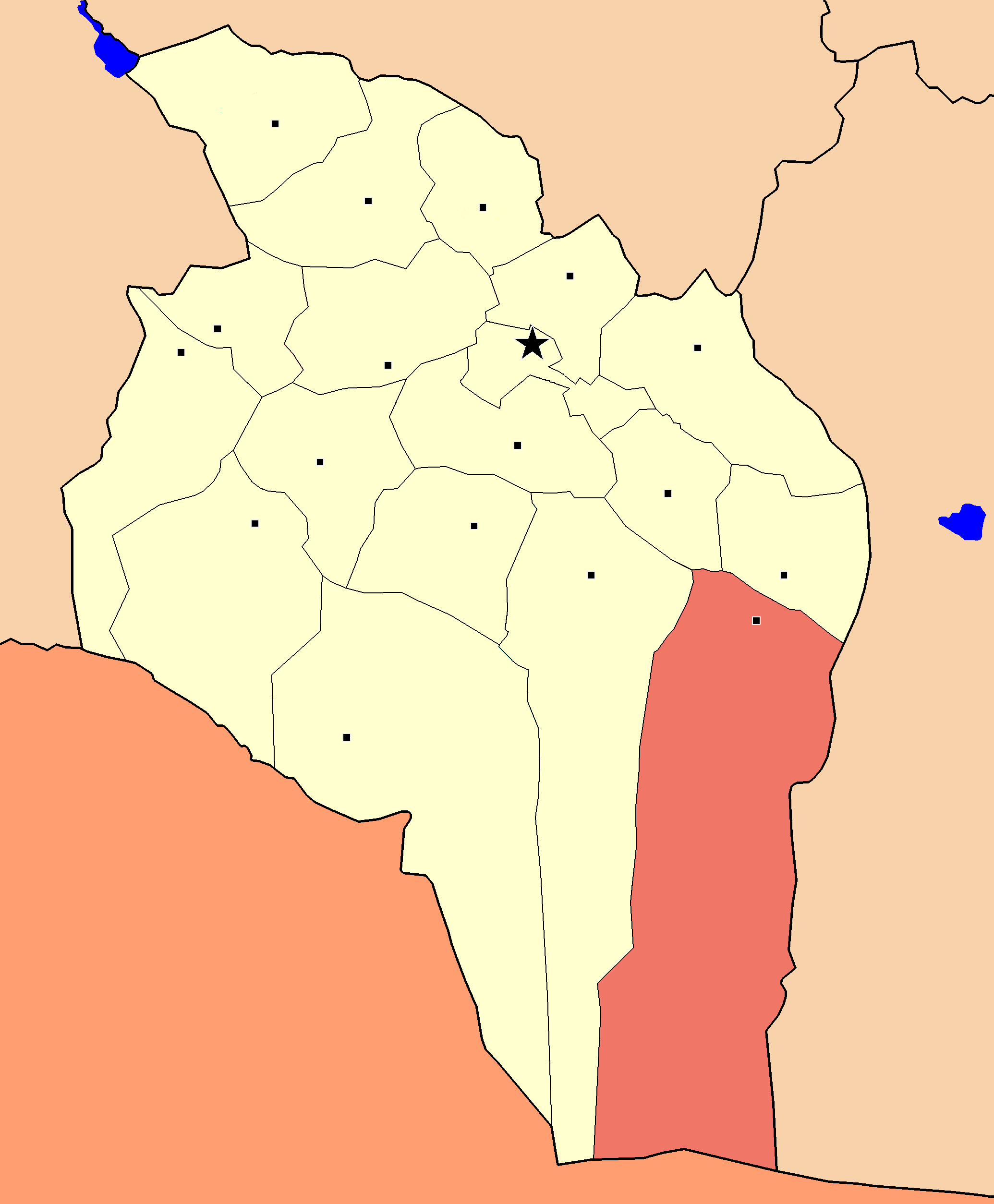
- Erdene District in Govi-Altai Province
- Country: Mongolia
- Province: Govi-Altai Province

Area
  - Total: 26,066 km^{2} (10,064 sq mi)
- Time zone: UTC+8 (UTC + 8)

Erdene (Mongolian: Эрдэнэ) is a sum (district) of Govi-Altai Province in western Mongolia. Former sum centre location is 45 08 19N 97 45 02E. In 2009, its population was 2,288.

== Administrative divisions ==
The district is divided into four bags, which are:

- Sangiin Dalai
- Tsagaan-Uul
- Tsetseg Nuur
- Ulziit
