= Erdene (given name) =

Origin
- Origin: Mongol, Sanskrit
- Meaning: Mongolian: Jewel
- Region of origin: Mongolia

Other names
- Derived: Ratna (Sanskrit)
- Related names: Radnaa
- Popularity: see popular names

Erdene is a Mongolian name and surname. The name is spelled "Эрдэнэ" in Mongol Cyrillic.

In Mongolia, Erdene is a component of the most popular name in the country, Bat-Erdene, meaning "firm jewel".

Notable people with the name include:

- Uranchimegiin Mönkh-Erdene, Mongolian Olympic boxer
- Badmaanyambuugiin Bat-Erdene, Mongolian politician and athlete
- Luvsannamsrain Oyun-Erdene, Mongolian politician, prime minister of Mongolia since 2021
