= Altai City =

Provincial capital of Govi-Altai Province, Mongolia

Altai Алтай ᠠᠯᠲᠠᠢ
- District
- Yesönbulag District; Есөнбулаг сум ᠶ᠋ᠢᠰᠦᠨᠪᠤᠯᠠᠭᠰᠤᠮᠤ

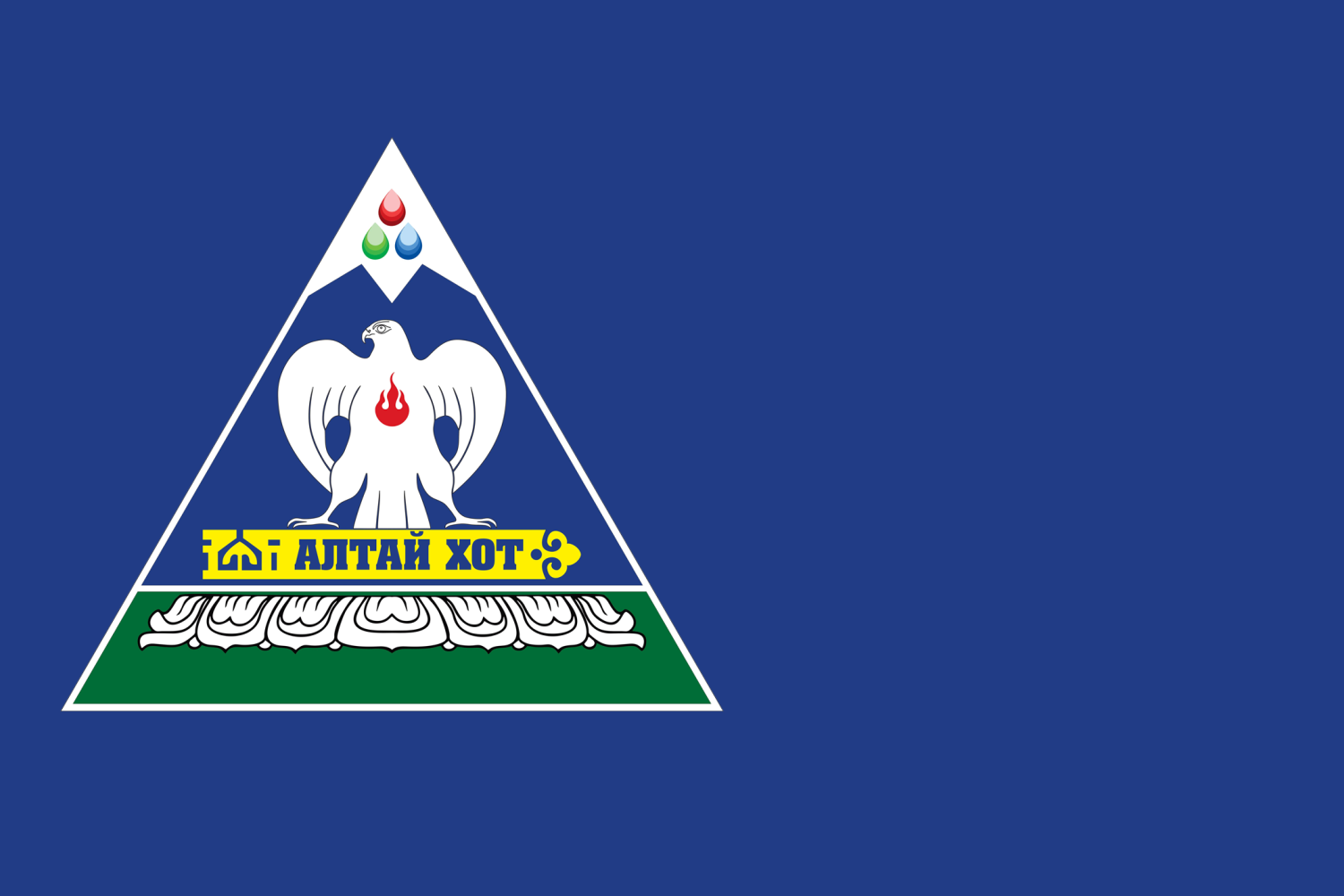
- Flag

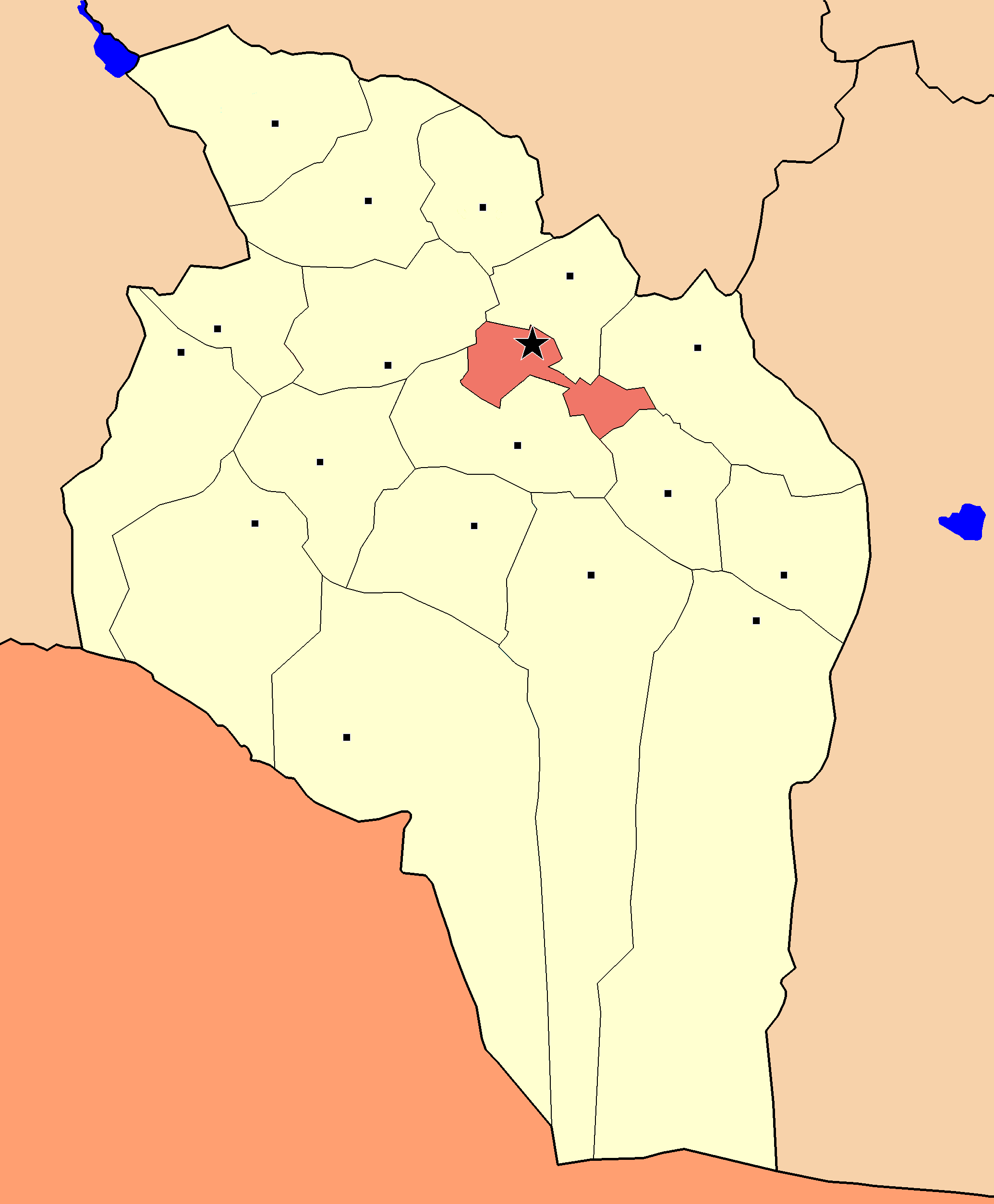

- Location in Mongolia
- Coordinates: 46°22′22″N 96°15′26″E
- Country: Mongolia
- Province (aimag): Govi-Altai
- District (sum): Yesönbulag

Area
  - Total: 2,161 km^{2} (834 sq mi)
- Elevation: 2,213 m (7,260 ft)

Population (2017)
  - Total: 17,617
  - Density: 8.152/km^{2} (21.11/sq mi)
- Area code: +976 (0) 148
- Vehicle registration: ГА
- Climate: BSk

Altai (Mongolian: Алтай хот, romanized: Altai hot, pronounced [aɬˈtʰæˑ χɔʰt]) is the capital of the Govi-Altai province in western Mongolia. As of 2008, its population is 15,800.

== Climate ==
Altai City has a typical Mongolian cold semi-arid climate (Köppen BSk) with subarctic (Dwc) influences. Despite the annual mean temperature of −0.5 °C or 31.1 °F being cold enough for sporadic permafrost, the climate is nearly dry enough to qualify as a cold arid climate (BWk). Altai City experiences long, very dry and very cold winters alongside short, mild summers when the majority of the scant precipitation occurs.

Climate data for Altai, elevation 2,180 m (7,150 ft), (1991–2020 normals, extremes 1954–present)
Month	Jan	Feb	Mar	Apr	May	Jun	Jul	Aug	Sep	Oct	Nov	Dec	Year
Record high °C (°F)	4.4 (39.9)	9.0 (48.2)	13.1 (55.6)	23.4 (74.1)	27.0 (80.6)	31.6 (88.9)	31.1 (88.0)	32.0 (89.6)	25.3 (77.5)	19.0 (66.2)	11.9 (53.4)	10.6 (51.1)	32.0 (89.6)
Mean daily maximum °C (°F)	−10.5 (13.1)	−7.1 (19.2)	−0.8 (30.6)	7.7 (45.9)	13.9 (57.0)	19.7 (67.5)	21.5 (70.7)	19.8 (67.6)	13.6 (56.5)	5.5 (41.9)	−2.8 (27.0)	−8.6 (16.5)	6.0 (42.8)
Daily mean °C (°F)	−18.0 (−0.4)	−14.6 (5.7)	−7.6 (18.3)	1.3 (34.3)	7.6 (45.7)	13.6 (56.5)	15.8 (60.4)	13.8 (56.8)	7.4 (45.3)	−0.7 (30.7)	−9.2 (15.4)	−15.4 (4.3)	−0.5 (31.1)
Mean daily minimum °C (°F)	−24.3 (−11.7)	−21.3 (−6.3)	−14.4 (6.1)	−5.1 (22.8)	1.2 (34.2)	7.2 (45.0)	9.9 (49.8)	7.8 (46.0)	1.4 (34.5)	−6.5 (20.3)	−15.3 (4.5)	−21.6 (−6.9)	−6.7 (19.9)
Record low °C (°F)	−40 (−40)	−39.8 (−39.6)	−35.9 (−32.6)	−30.6 (−23.1)	−16.4 (2.5)	−6.9 (19.6)	−0.4 (31.3)	−4.4 (24.1)	−17.2 (1.0)	−28.9 (−20.0)	−35 (−31)	−38.4 (−37.1)	−40.0 (−40.0)
Average precipitation mm (inches)	2 (0.1)	2 (0.1)	5 (0.2)	9 (0.4)	17 (0.7)	34 (1.3)	46 (1.8)	35 (1.4)	16 (0.6)	9 (0.4)	4 (0.2)	3 (0.1)	182 (7.3)
Average precipitation days (≥ 1.0 mm)	1.4	1.5	2.1	2.4	3.7	5.7	7.0	5.7	3.5	2.6	1.9	1.6	39.1
Average relative humidity (%)	71.7	67.1	59.7	51.4	49.1	52.9	58.6	59.0	55.8	61.4	68.7	71.4	60.6
Mean monthly sunshine hours	201.1	208.3	252.2	260.6	308.9	298.5	293.2	290.2	272.4	246.1	199.6	184.8	3,015.9
Mean daily sunshine hours	6.5	7.4	8.1	8.7	10.0	10.0	9.5	9.4	9.1	7.9	6.7	6.0	8.3
Source 1: Pogoda.ru.net
Source 2: NOAA (sun 1961-1990), Deutscher Wetterdienst (daily sun 1961-1990)

== Infrastructure ==
The city receives its water supply from Zavkhan River connected by a 54-km water pipeline through the Taishir-Altai Water Treatment Plant.

=== Power plants ===
- Serven Solar Power Plant

== Tourist attractions ==
- Museum of Govi-Altai Province

== Transportation ==
The Altai Airport (LTI/ZMAT) has three runways and is served by regular flights to Arvaikheer and Ulaanbaatar.
