= State Department Store =

Shopping mall in Mongolia

- Улсын Их Дэлгүүр
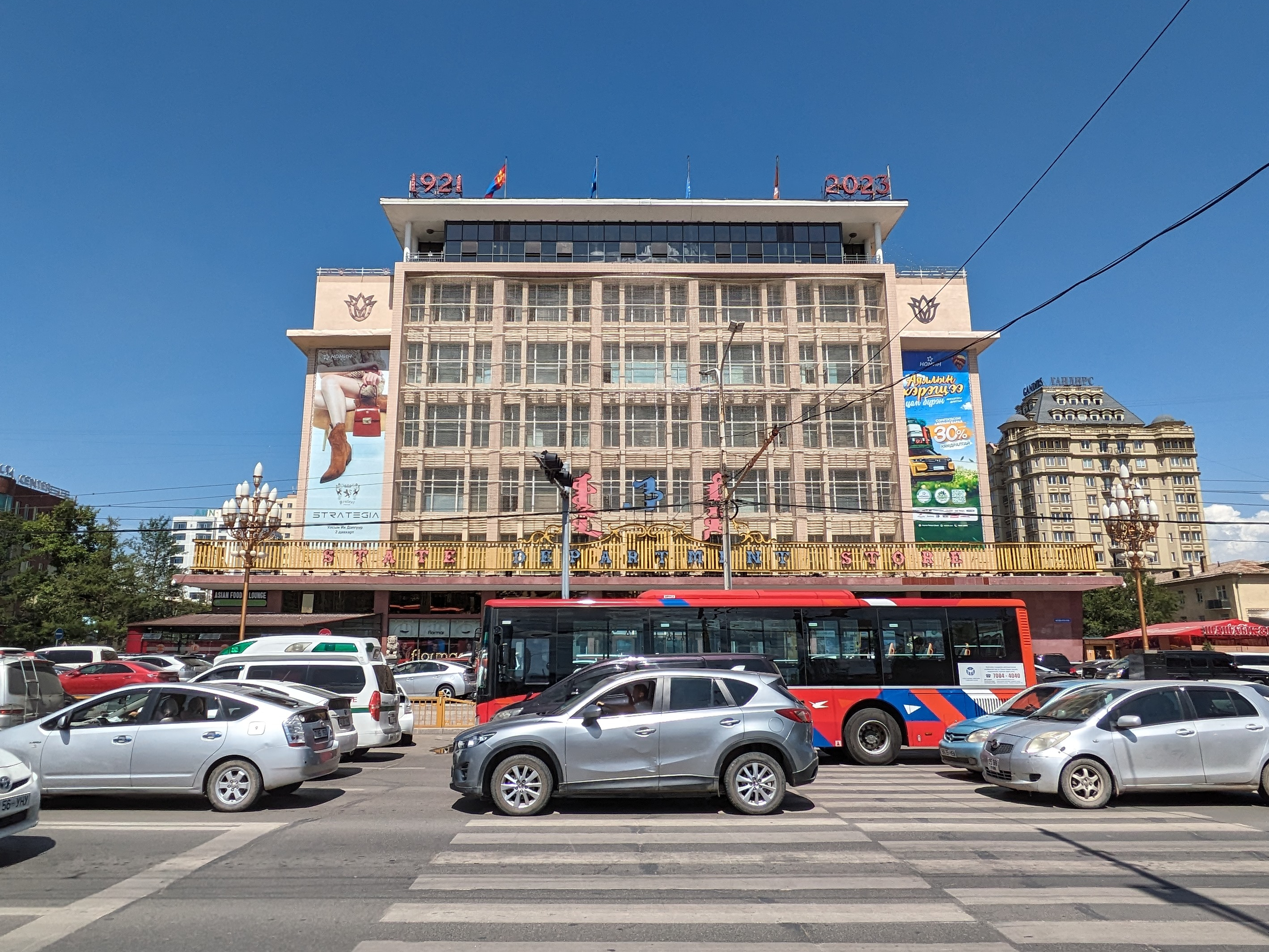
- Location: Chingeltei, Ulaanbaatar, Mongolia
- Coordinates: 47°55′01″N 106°54′23″E
- Opened: 1924 (first building); 1933 (second building); 1961 (current building)
- Previous names: Central Store; Under Khorshoo
- Owner: Nomin Holding
- Floors: 7

The State Department Store (Mongolian: Улсын Их Дэлгүүр) is a shopping mall in Chingeltei District, Ulaanbaatar, Mongolia. It was the first shopping mall in the country.

== History ==
=== First building ===
The construction of the shopping mall started in 1921 with the assistance of the Soviet Union. It was completed and opened in 1924 as the Central Store or Big Shop, making it the first shopping mall in the country.

=== Second building ===
In 1933, it moved to a new building and was called Under Khorshoo. The building was constructed in 1905 and was initially used as a shop. It was a two-story European architectural style of building. In 1959, the government of the Mongolian People's Republic decided to make a new building for the shopping mall.

=== Current building ===
It moved to its current building and was opened on 28 June 1961 and was called the State Department Store. The former building was then turned into the Fine Arts Zanabazar Museum. In 1999, the shopping mall was privatized. On 7 June 2020, a fire destroyed the fifth and sixth floor of the building.

== Architecture ==
The shopping mall is a 7-story building. It was constructed with Soviet architectural style with the aid of China.

== Business ==
The shopping mall is owned by Nomin Holding. The building was constructed with a cost of MNY150 million.

== Gallery ==
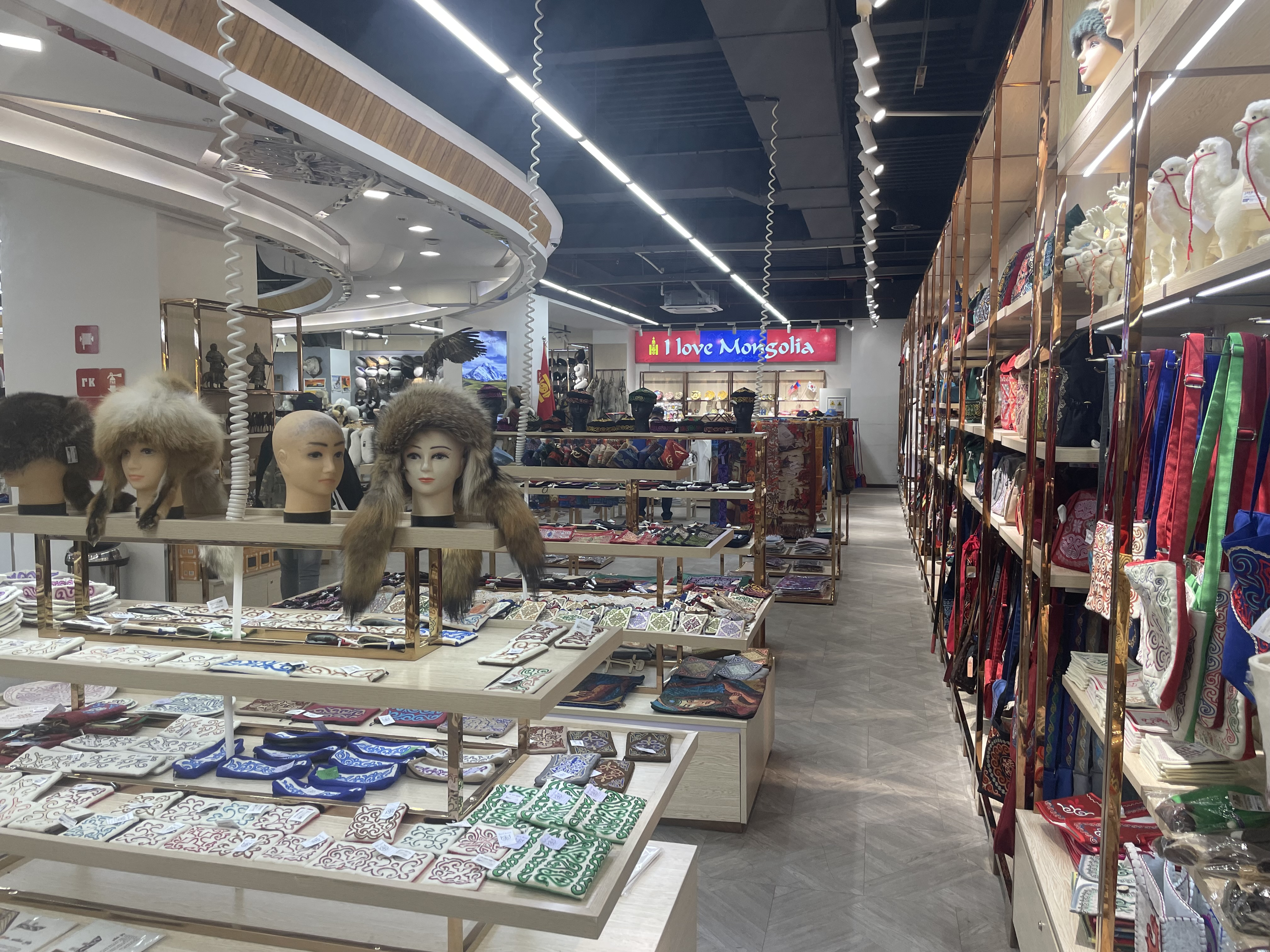
State Department Store interior

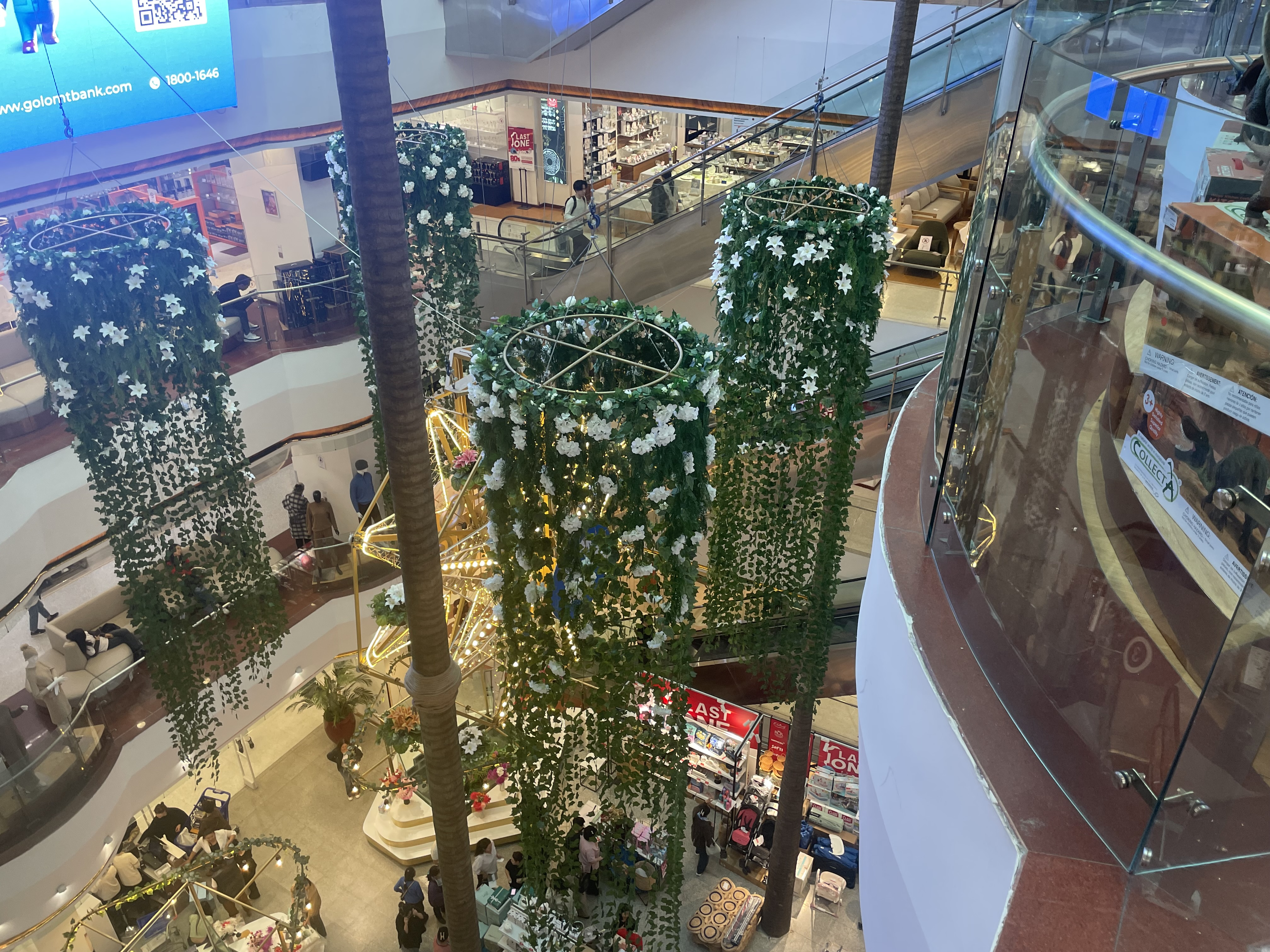
State Department Store interior
