= Govi-Altai Province =

Province of Mongolia

Govi-Altai Province Говь-Алтай аймаг ᠭᠣᠪᠢᠠᠯᠲᠠᠢᠠᠶᠢᠮᠠᠭ
- Province
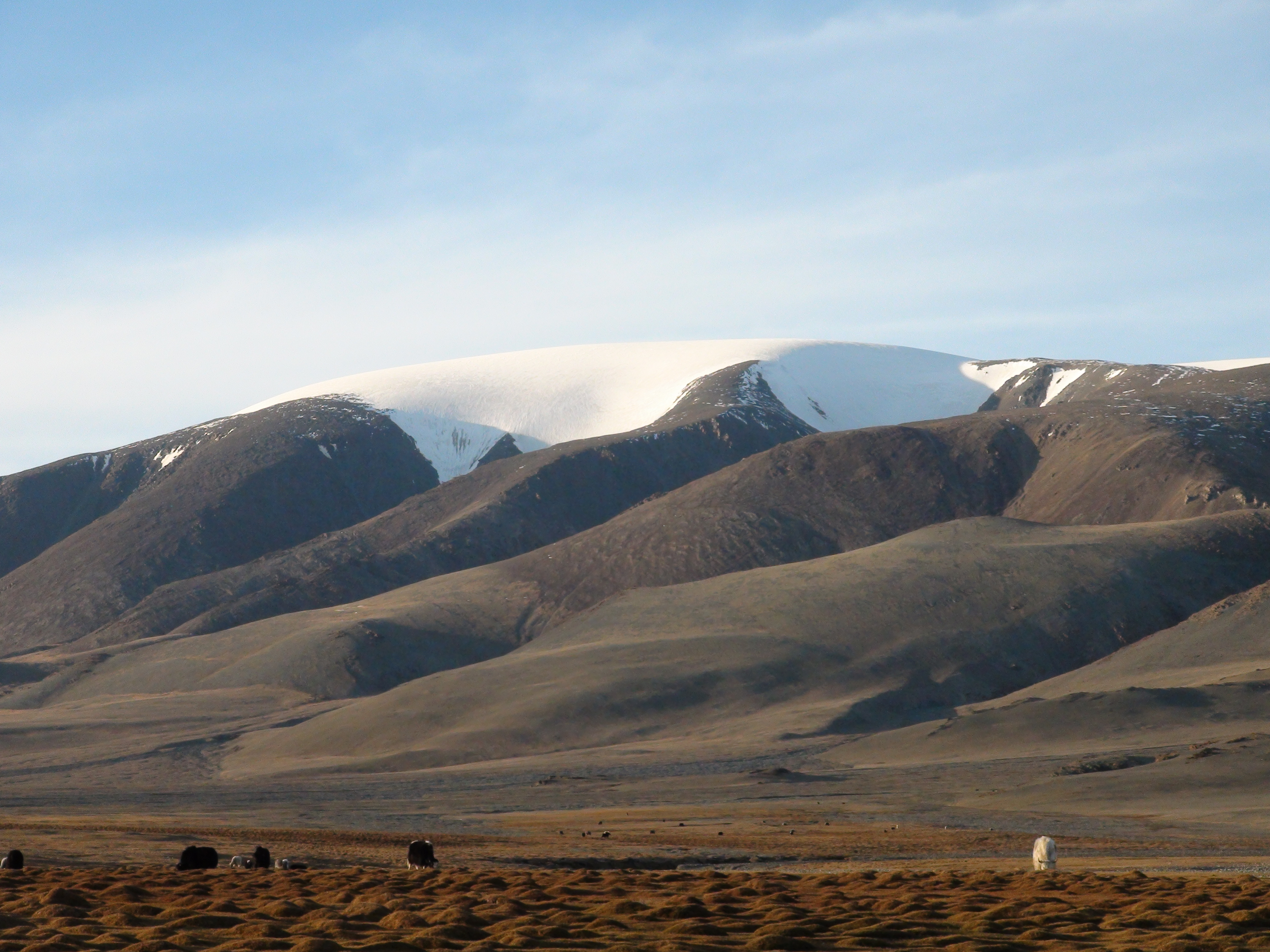
- Sutai Mountain in the western part of Govi-Altai Province

- Flag Coat of arms

- Coordinates: 45°30′N 95°30′E
- Country: Mongolia
- Established: 1940
- Capital: Altai City

Area
  - Total: 141,447.67 km^{2} (54,613.25 sq mi)
- Highest elevation: 3,802 m (12,474 ft)

Population (2025)
  - Total: 56,091
  - Density: 0.39655/km^{2} (1.0271/sq mi)

GDP
  - Total: MNT 445 billion US$ 0.1 billion (2022)
  - Per capita: MNT 7,612,630; US$ 2,437 (2022)
- Time zone: UTC+7
- Area code: +976 (0)148
- ISO 3166 code: MN-065
- Vehicle registration: ГА_
- Website: www.govi-altai.gov.mn

Govi-Altai (Note: Mongolian: Говь-Алтай, IPA: [ɢœw̜ ɐɬtʰɛ́ː]) (or Gobi-Altai) is one of the 21 aimags (provinces) of Mongolia, located in the west of the country. Its capital is Altai City. It is the least densely populated Aimag.

== Transportation ==
The Altai Airport (LTI/ZMAT) has one paved runway and is served by regular flights to Arvaikheer, Bayankhongor and Ulaanbaatar. The new arrival/departure building was opened to the public in 2013.

== Administrative subdivisions ==
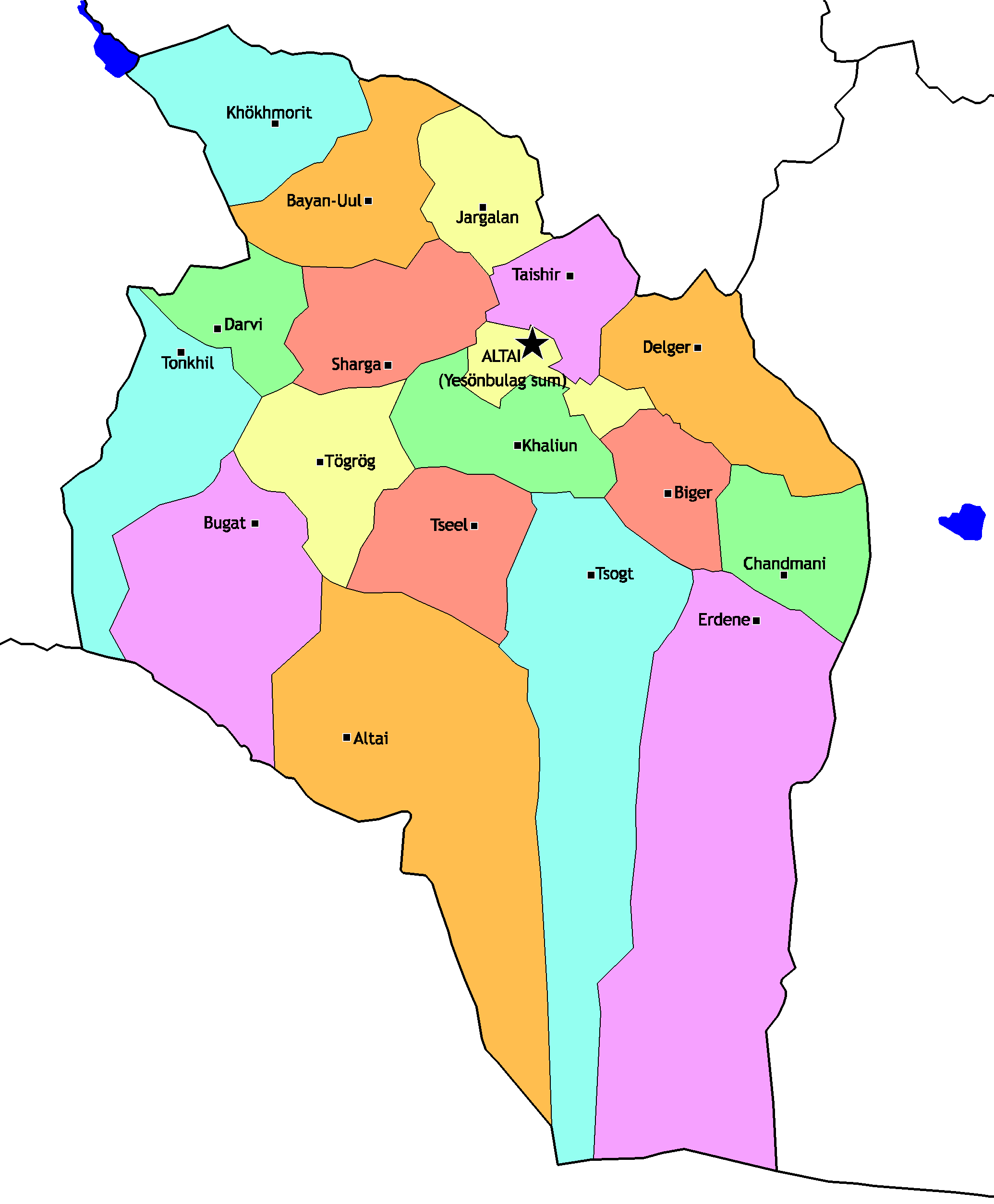
Sums of Govi-Altai

The capital Altai is geographically located in Yesönbulag sum and not to be confused with the Altai sum in the south of the aimag.

The sums of Govi-Altai Aimag
| Sum | Mongolian | Area (km^{2}) | Population 2007(est.) | Population 2009(est.) | Density (/km^{2}) | Distance from Altai city (km) |
|---|---|---|---|---|---|---|
| Altai | Алтай | 20,256 | 2,386 | 2,152 | 0.11 | 318 |
| Bayan-Uul | Баян-Уул | 5,836 | 2,953 | 2,943 | 0.50 | 146 |
| Biger | Бигэр | 3,826 | 2,460 | 2,197 | 0.57 | 108 |
| Bugat | Бугат | 9,921 | 2,461 | 2,257 | 0.23 | 219 |
| Chandmani | Чандмань | 4,629 | 2,024 | 2,053 | 0.44 | 189 |
| Darvi | Дарви | 3,523 | 1,877 | 1,819 | 0.52 | 212 |
| Delger | Дэлгэр | 6,625 | 3,066 | 3,104 | 0.47 | 88 |
| Erdene | Эрдэнэ | 26,066 | 2,280 | 2,288 | 0.09 | 223 |
| Khaliun | Халиун | 4,214 | 2,546 | 2,497 | 0.59 | 87 |
| Khökh morit | Хөх морьт | 6,314 | 2,404 | 2,461 | 0.39 | 215 |
| Jargalan | Жаргалан | 3,683 | 1,885 | 1,904 | 0.52 | 102 |
| Sharga | Шарга | 5,566 | 1,930 | 1,921 | 0.35 | 79 |
| Taishir | Тайшир | 3,913 | 1,575 | 1,536 | 0.39 | 43 |
| Tögrög | Төгрөг | 5,343 | 1,871 | 1,914 | 0.36 | 148 |
| Tonkhil | Тонхил | 7,322 | 2,388 | 2,402 | 0.33 | 218 |
| Tseel | Цээл | 5,631 | 2,235 | 2,038 | 0.36 | 167 |
| Tsogt | Цогт | 16,618 | 3,950 | 3,697 | 0.22 | 187 |
| Yesönbulag* | Есөнбулаг | 2,161 | 17,527 | 16,243 | 7.52 | 0 |

*Includes the capital of Govi-Altai Aimag, Altai City.

== Economy ==
In 2018, the province contributed to 0.97% of the total national GDP of Mongolia.
