= Batshireet =

District in Khentii Province, Mongolia

Coordinates: 48°41′33″N 110°11′34″E

Батширээт сум Батширээт сум ᠪᠠᠲᠤᠰᠢᠷᠡᠭᠡᠲᠦᠰᠤᠮᠤ Batshireet
- District
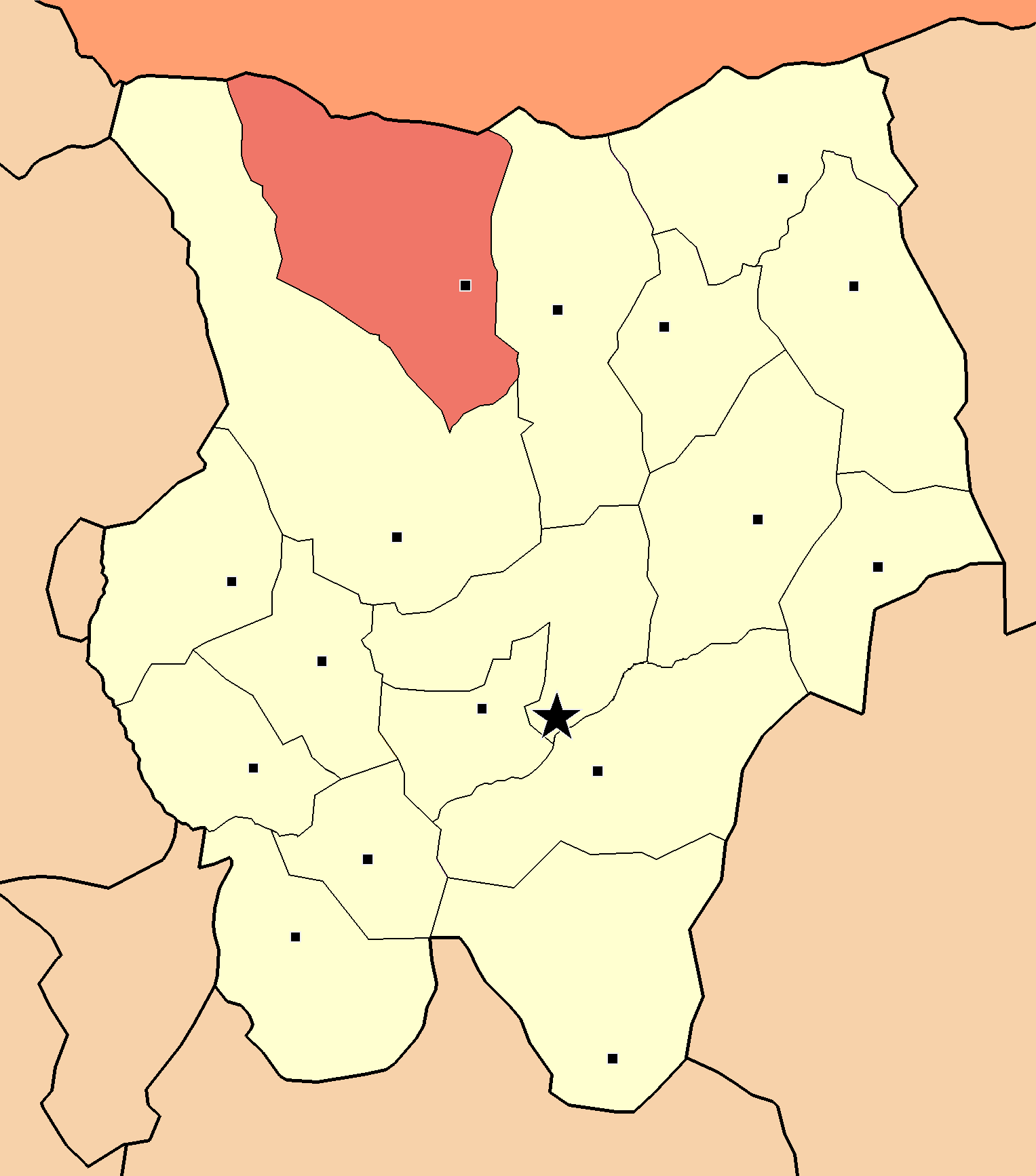
- Batshireet sum in Khentii Province
- Country: Mongolia
- Province: Khentii Province

Area
  - Total: 7,018 km^{2} (2,710 sq mi)
- Time zone: UTC+8 (UTC + 8)

Batshireet (Mongolian: Батширээт = "pedestal firm") is a sum (district) of Khentii Province in eastern Mongolia. It is named after Batshireet Mountain. In 2010, its population was 2,086.

== Geography ==
Batshireet is the second largest district in Khentii Province after Ömnödelger.

== Administrative divisions ==
The district is divided into four bags, which are:

- Barkh (Барх)
- Khurkh (Хурх)
- Norovlin (Норовлин)
- Onon
