= Genepil =

Last queen consort of Mongolia (1905–1938)

Genepil Гэнэпил Хатан ᠭᠡᠨᠡᠩᠫᠢᠯ ᠬᠠᠲᠤᠨ

Khatun of Mongolia
- Tenure: December 1923 – 20 May 1924
- Predecessor: Dondogdulam Khatun
- Successor: Monarchy abolished
- Born: Tseyenpil; 1905; Khentii Province, Outer Mongolia, Qing Empire
- Died: May 1938 (aged 32–33); Ulaanbaatar, Mongolian People's Republic
- Spouse: Unknown first husband (sep. or div. 1923) Bogd Khan (m. 1923; died 1924) Luvsandamba (m. between 1924-1938) (Note: Possibly the same person as her first husband.)
- Issue: Several, including Tserenkhand
- House: Imperial House of Bogd
- Religion: Tibetan Buddhism

Genepil (Note: Mongolian: Гэнэнпил Хатан, romanized: Genenpil Khatan; Traditional Mongolian: ᠭᠡᠨᠡᠩᠫᠢᠯ ᠬᠠᠲᠤᠨ) (1905 – May 1938) was the last queen consort of Mongolia, married to Bogd Khan. She was queen consort for less than a year in 1924. Genepil was executed in May 1938 as part of the Stalinist repressions in Mongolia.

== Queen consort ==
Genepil was born Tseyenpil in 1905 to a family in Northern Mongolia, around the Baldan Bereeven Monastery.

After the death of Dondogdulam Khatun in 1923, Genepil was chosen as her successor among a group of women between the ages of 18 and 20 years old who were selected by the king's counsellors. Genepil was already married, and some sources identify her husband as the Luvsandamba, the same man whose wife she was at the time of her death. She lived with Bogd Khan until his death on 20 May 1924, when the monarchy was abolished.

== Life after court ==
Genepil returned to her family after leaving the Mongolian court; she then married (or reunited with, in case he was the same person as her first husband) Luvsandamba.

In 1937, the government of the Mongolian People's Republic accused Genepil of gathering materiel in order to stage an uprising with the help of Japan. She was subsequently arrested and executed in 1938. She was pregnant at the time of her execution.

== In popular culture ==
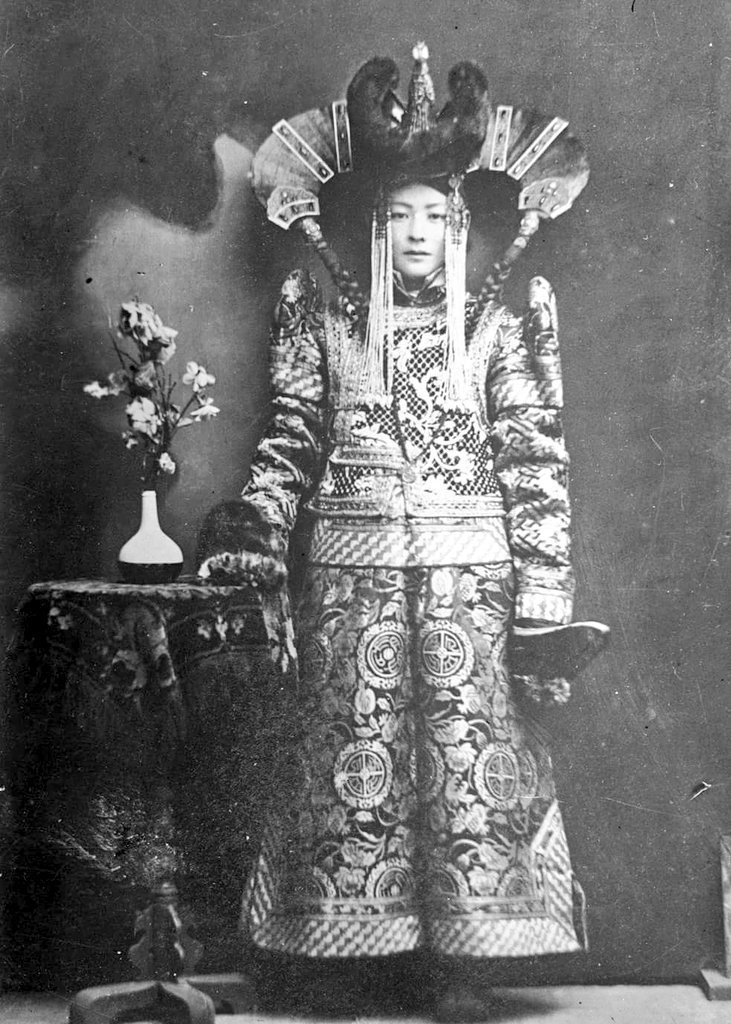
This 1921 photo is said to be of Genepil, but it is disputed.

The costume design for the Star Wars character Padmé Amidala took inspiration from a 1921 image of a Mongolian woman that is commonly, though incorrectly, identified as Genepil.
