= Berkh Thermal Power Plant =

Coal-fired power plant in Berkh, Khentii, Mongolia

- Official name: Бэрх Дулааны Цахилгаан Станц
- Country: Mongolia
- Location: Berkh, Batnorov, Khentii Province
- Coordinates: 47°47′02.5″N 111°09′47.5″E
- Status: Operational
- Commission date: 24 June 2024

Thermal power station
- Primary fuel: Coal
- Turbine technology: Steam turbine

Power generation
- Nameplate capacity: 21 MW

The Berkh Power Plant (Mongolian: Бэрх Дулааны Цахилгаан Станц) is a coal-fired power station in Berkh, Batnorov, Khentii Province, Mongolia.

== History ==
The power station was commissioned on 24 June 2024 in an opening ceremony attended by Prime Minister Luvsannamsrain Oyun-Erdene.

== Technical specifications ==
The power station has an installed generation capacity of 21 MW. It acts also as district heating to heat up residential and commercial buildings around it.

== See also ==
- List of power stations in Mongolia
