= Avraga Toson resort =

Resort in Delgerkhaan, Khentii, Mongolia

Coordinates: 47°10′55″N 109°08′56″E

Avraga Toson (Mongolian: Аврага Тосон) is a spa resort in the Delgerkhaan sum (district) of Khentii Province in eastern Mongolia. The lakes at the resort have water with high concentration of mineral elements and yellow mud.
