= Onon River Bridge =

Bridge in Khentii, Mongolia

- Coordinates: 48°41′41.5″N 111°15′19.1″E
- Carries: land vehicle
- Crosses: Onon River
- Locale: Khentii, Mongolia

Characteristics
- Total length: 150 m

History
- Constructed by: Gan Guur Company
- Construction start: May 2019
- Opened: 10 May 2020

Location
- Interactive map of Onon River Bridge

The Onon River Bridge is a bridge in Khentii Province, Mongolia.

== History ==
The groundbreaking ceremony for the construction of the bridge was held in May 2019 attended by Prime Minister Ukhnaagiin Khürelsükh and Minister of Road and Transport Development. The bridge was opened on 10 May 2020.

== Technical specifications ==
The bridge connects Bayan-Adarga District and Dadal District over the Onon River. It was built by Gan Guur Company. It has a total length of 150 meters.

== See also ==
- Transport in Mongolia
