= Khar Zurkhnii Khokh Lake =

Lake in Tsenkhermandal, Khentii Province, Mongolia

- Хар зүрхний Хөх нуур (Mongolian)
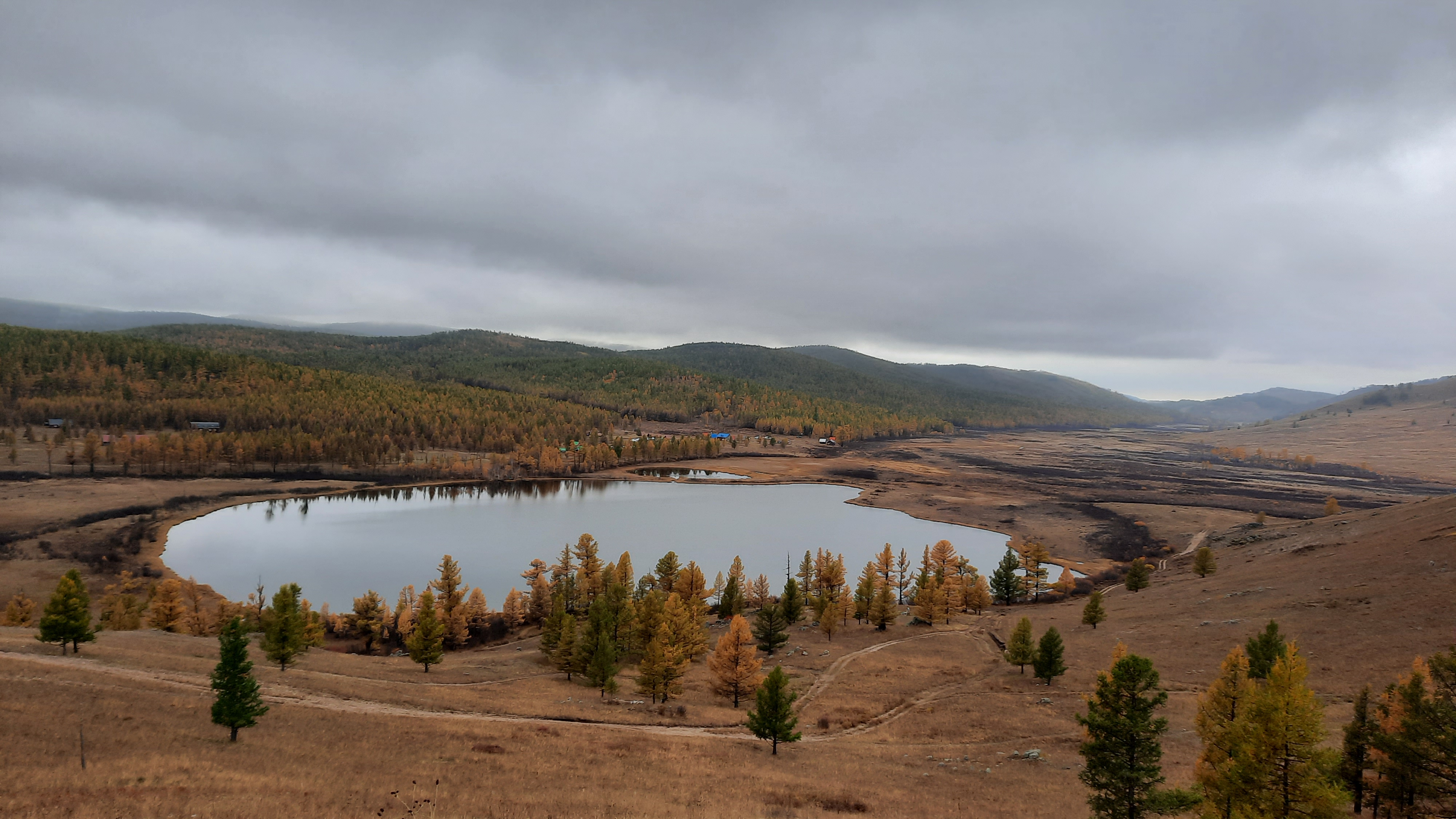

- Location within Mongolia
- Location: Tsenkhermandal, Khentii, Mongolia
- Coordinates: 48°1′13.2″N 108°56′52.3″E
- Type: lake

The Khar Zurkhnii Khokh Lake (Mongolian: Хар зүрхний Хөх нуур) is a lake in Tsenkhermandal, Khentii Province, Mongolia.

== Geology ==
The lake consists of two small lakes which interlink with each other.

== Architecture ==
Nearby the lake lies a small plaque to commemorate the coronation of Temüjin to become Genghis Khan.

== See also ==
- Geology of Mongolia
