= Bargilt Iron Ore Mine =

Coal mine in Darkhan, Khentii, Mongolia

Bargilt Iron Ore Mine Баргилт төмрийн хүдрийн ил уурхай
- Location within Mongolia

Location
- Location: Darkhan, Khentii, Mongolia; 46°19′52.8″N 109°17′13.2″E

Production
- Products: iron ore

Owner
- Company: Mongolrostsvetmet LLC

The Bargilt Iron Ore Mine (Mongolian: Баргилт төмрийн хүдрийн ил уурхай) is an iron ore mine in Darkhan District, Khentii Province, Mongolia.

== History ==
The mine was explored in 1984–1987.

== Business ==
The deposit is owned by Mongolian-Russian joint venture company Mongolrostsvetmet LLC.

== See also ==
- Mining in Mongolia
