= Bürenkhaan, Khentii =

Human settlement in Khentii, Mongolia

Coordinates: 48°53′49″N 111°42′26″E

Bürenkhaan (Mongolian: Бүрэнхаан) is a town in the Norovlin sum (district) of Khentii Province in eastern Mongolia. it is strictly protected by the government as it is in Khan Khentii Mountain National Park. The Onon River flows nearby the town.
