= Gurvanbayan, Khentii =

Bag in Ömnödelger, Khentii, Mongolia

Coordinates: 48°10′48″N 110°18′30″E

Mongolian name
- Mongolian Cyrillic: Гурванбаян
- Mongolian script: ᠪᠭᠤᠷᠪᠠᠨᠪᠠᠶᠠᠨ
Transcriptions
- SASM/GNC: Gurvanbayan

Gurvanbayan (Mongolian: Гурванбаян, Three riches, also Khurkh Mongolian: Хурх) is a bag in Ömnödelger sum (district) of Khentii Province, Mongolia. Settlement population is 1,019 (2009).

Gurvanbayan is an arable farming settlement. It was the center of the former Gurvanbayan sum. There is a hospital in this settlement.
