= Byambasuren Sharav =

Mongolian composer and pianist (1952–2019)

Byambasuren Sharav (Mongolian: Бямбасүрэнгийн Шарав, Byambasürengiin Sharav) (13 November 1952 – 15 July 2019) was a Mongolian composer and pianist.

== Life ==
Sharav was born in Jargaltkhaan Sum in Khentii Province. He learned as a child from his father to play the accordion. As a music teacher at an elementary school, he began to compose children's songs. From 1975 he studied at the Sverdlovsk Conservatory in the Soviet Union. He died on July 15, 2019.

== Work ==
Byambasuren Sharav composed over 200 songs and composed for more than twenty major motion pictures, eight concertos for Mongolian folk instruments, three symphonies, and four ballets. He was commissioned by Yo-Yo Ma for the Silk Road Project in 2000, for which he wrote his piece Legend of Herlen. Also of note is his Genghis Khan composition (2003). Two of his compositions featured at the Stanford Pan-Asian Music Festival in February 2011.

== Awards ==
He was given the Honored Art Worker of Mongolia Award in 2002.

He was also given the Labor Hero (Mongolian : Хөдөлмөрийн баатар) in 2019.
