= Onon =

Onon may refer to:

- Onon (river), river in Mongolia and Russia
- Onon, Khentii, town in the Khentii Province of Mongolia
- Onon (crater), crater on Mars named after the river
