= Kherlenbayan-Ulaan, Khentii =

Bag in Delgerkhaan, Khentii, Mongolia

Coordinates: 47°12′43″N 108°44′38″E

Kherlenbayan-Ulaan (Mongolian: Хэрлэнбаян-Улаан) is a bag in the Delgerkhaan sum (district) of Khentii Province in eastern Mongolia.

Kherlenbayan-Ulaan is an arable farming center.
