= Tsendiin Dondogdulam =

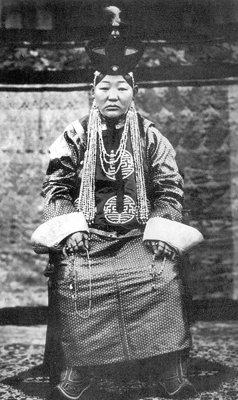
- Dondogdulam Khatun, 1912

Khatun of Mongolia
- Tenure: 29 December 1911 – 8 November 1923
- Predecessor: Monarchy established
- Successor: Genepil Khatun
- Born: 15 November 1876; Khentii, Outer Mongolia, Qing Empire
- Died: 8 November 1923 (aged 46); Niislel Khuree, Mongolia
- Spouse: Bogd Khan
- Issue: 1 unnamed son Luvsanjambyn Mördorj (adopted)
- House: Imperial House of Bogd
- Religion: Tibetan Buddhism

Tsendiin Dondogdulam (15 November 1876 – 8 November 1923) was the queen consort (Khatun) of Mongolia, married to Bogd Khan.

== Biography ==
Dondogdulam Tsend was born on November 15, 1876, in Khentii, Mongolia. She first met Bogd Khan in 1895 during his visit to the Erdene Zuu Monastery. Another time, they met in 1900 during a trip to Amarbayasgalant monastery. In 1902, they were married and had a son. According to custom she adopted and raised many children from families that could not care for them. One of them was Luvsanjambyn Mördorj who became a prominent Mongolian composer. She and Bogd Khan also initiated and created the Bogd Khan's residence that also housed artisans and craftsmen.

Dondogdulam died in 1923, one year before the death of her spouse. A day of rest was observed on the 15th day of the last month of autumn. Dondogdulam was cremated at the source of the Selbe river near Ulaanbaatar, where at one time she and her husband spent the summer season.
