= Bayan-Adarga, Khentii =

District in Khentii Province, Mongolia

Coordinates: 48°33′14″N 111°05′04″E

Bayan-Adarga District Баян-Адарга сум ᠪᠠᠶ᠋ᠠᠨᠠᠳᠤᠷᠭ᠎ᠠᠰᠤᠮᠤ
- District
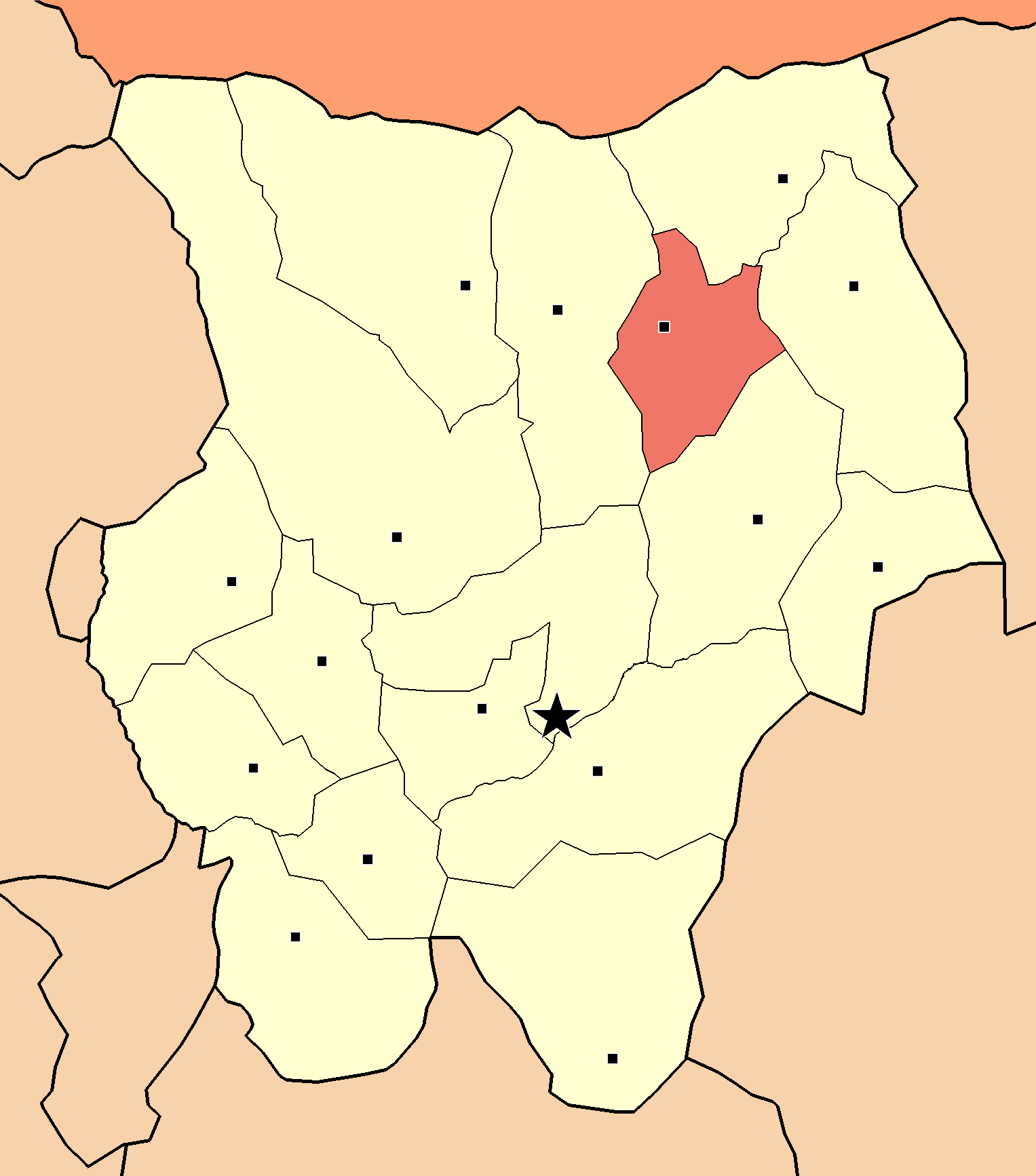
- Bayan-Adarga District in Khentii Province
- Country: Mongolia
- Province: Khentii Province

Area
  - Total: 3,021 km^{2} (1,166 sq mi)
- Time zone: UTC+8 (UTC + 8)

Bayan-Adarga (Mongolian: Баян-Адарга; "Rich Obstacle") is a sum (district) of Khentii Province in eastern Mongolia. In 2010, its population was 2,205.

== Administrative divisions ==
The district is divided into four bags, which are:

- Adarga (Адарга)
- Duurlig (Дуурлиг)
- Jargalant (Жаргалант)
- Saikhan (Сайхан)

== Transportation ==
- Onon River Bridge
