= Tsenkhermandal, Khentii =

District in Khentii Province, Mongolia

Coordinates: 47°44′38″N 109°02′55″E

Tsenkhermandal District Цэнхэрмандал сум ᠴᠡᠩᠬᠡᠷᠮᠠᠨᠳᠠᠯᠰᠤᠮᠤ
- District
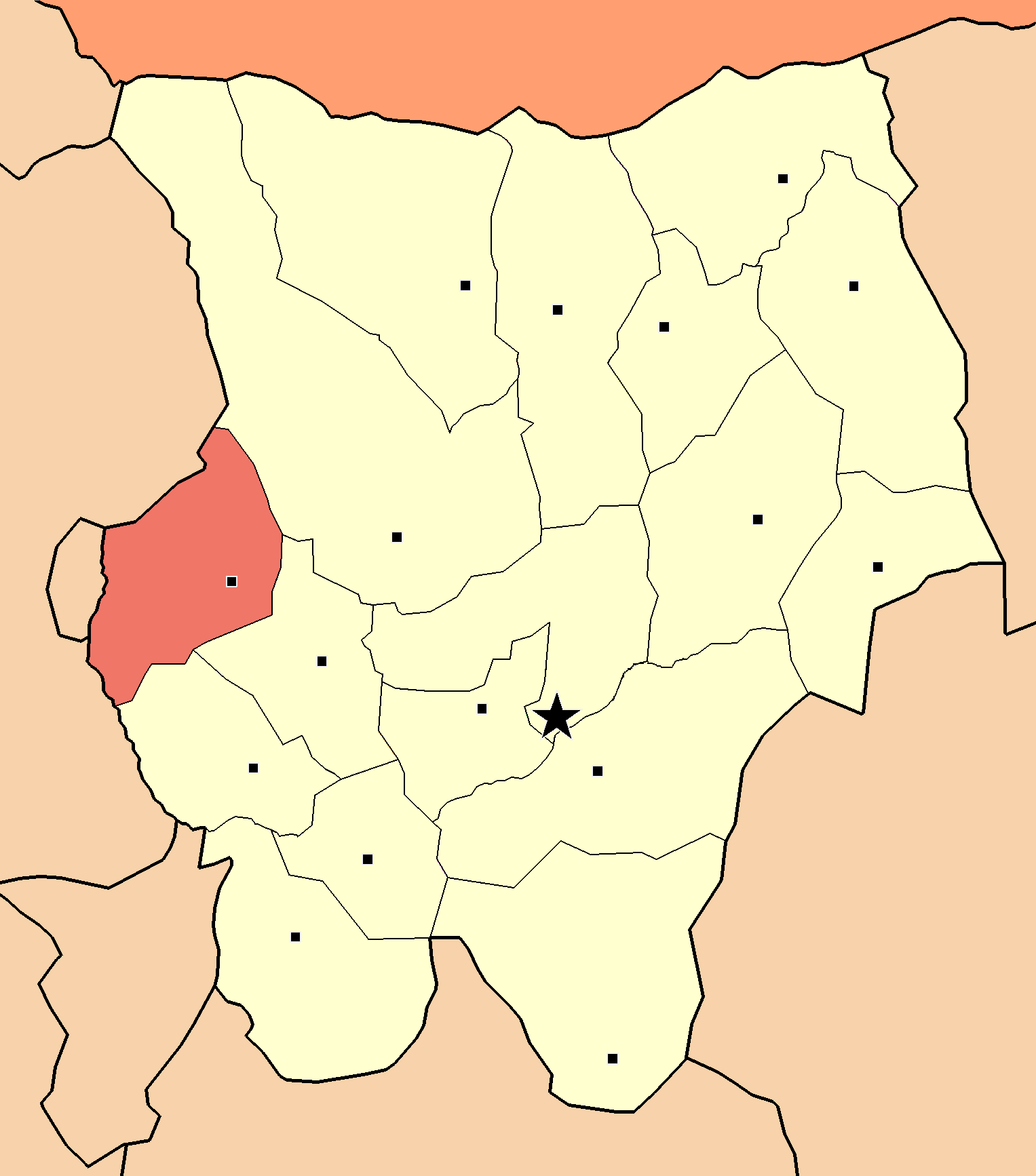
- Location of Tsenkhermandal in Khentii Province
- Country: Mongolia
- Province: Khentii Province

Area
  - Total: 3,177 km^{2} (1,227 sq mi)
- Time zone: UTC+8 (UTC + 8)

Tsenkhermandal (Mongolian: Цэнхэрмандал) is a sum (district) of Khentii Province in eastern Mongolia. In 2010, its population was 2,004.

== Administrative divisions ==
The district is divided into four bags, which are:

- Bayanmod
- Khujkhan
- Nugaar
- Sogoot

== Tourist attractions ==
- Khar Zurkhnii Khokh Lake
