= Delgerkhaan, Khentii =

District in Khentii Province, Mongolia

Coordinates: 47°10′41″N 109°11′22″E

Delgerkhaan District Дэлгэрхаан сум ᠳᠡᠯᠭᠡᠷᠬᠠᠨᠰᠤᠮᠤ
- District
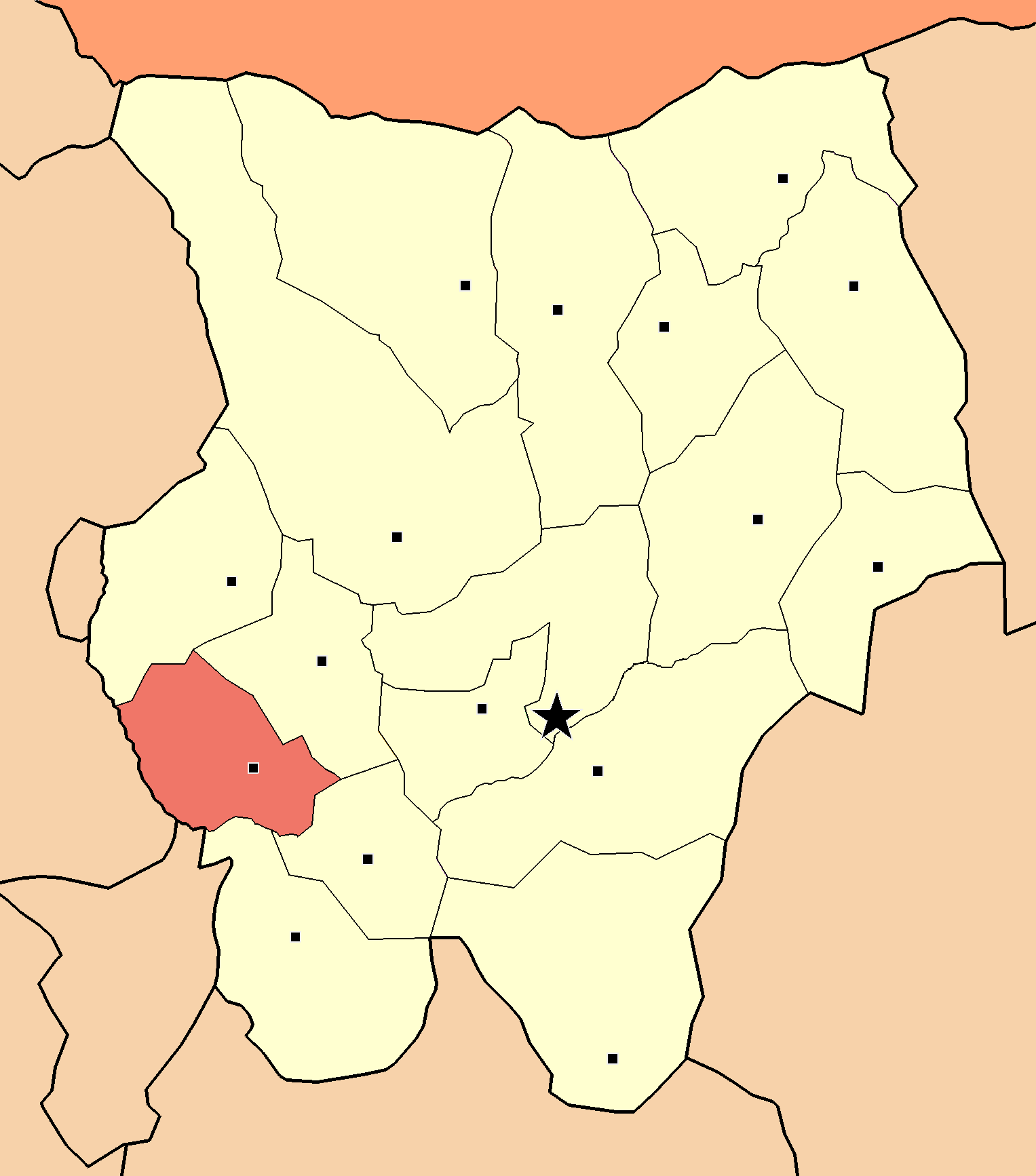
- Delgerkhaan District in Khentii Province
- Country: Mongolia
- Province: Khentii Province

Area
  - Total: 3,986 km^{2} (1,539 sq mi)
- Time zone: UTC+8 (UTC + 8)

Delgerkhaan (Mongolian: Дэлгэрхаан) is a sum (district) of Khentii Province in Eastern Mongolia. Avraga Toson resort is 4 km west of the Delgerkhaan sum center. Kherlenbayan-Ulaan settlement is 38 km west of the Delgerkhaan sum center. In 2010, its population was 2,040.

== Administrative divisions ==
The district is divided into five bags, which are:

- Avarga (Аварга)
- Bayankhaan
- Dolood (Долоод)
- Kherlen Toono (Хэрлэн тооно)
- Kherlenbayan-Ulaan
