= Bayanmönkh, Khentii =

District in Khentii Province, Mongolia

Coordinates: 46°53′58″N 109°45′41″E

Bayanmönkh District Баянмөнх сум ᠪᠠᠶ᠋ᠠᠨᠮᠥ᠋ᠩᠬᠡᠰᠤᠮᠤ
- District
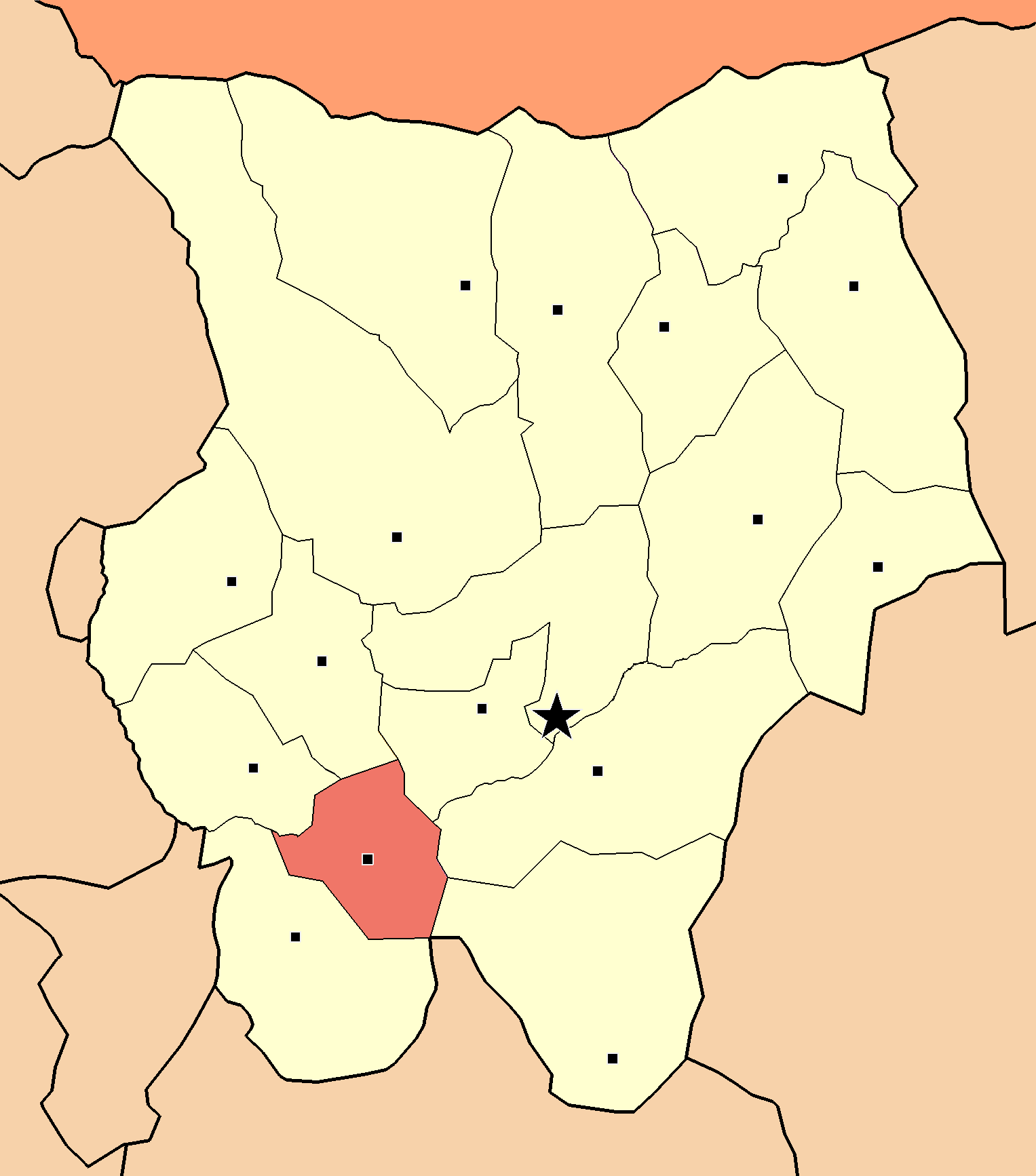
- Bayanmönkh District in Khentii Province
- Country: Mongolia
- Province: Khentii Province

Area
  - Total: 2,540 km^{2} (980 sq mi)
- Time zone: UTC+8 (UTC + 8)

Bayanmönkh (Mongolian: Баянмөнх, Rich eternal) is a sum (district) of Khentii Province in eastern Mongolia. In 2010, its population was 1,347.

== Geography ==
Bayanmönkh is the second smallest district in the province.

== Administrative divisions ==
The district is divided into four bags, which are:

- Bayanbulag
- Dulaan
- Kherlen
- Ulaan-Ereg
