= Norovlin, Khentii =

District in Khentii Province, Mongolia

Coordinates: 48°41′31″N 111°59′43″E

Norovlin District Норовлин сум ᠨᠣᠷᠪᠤᠯᠢᠩᠰᠤᠮᠤ
- District
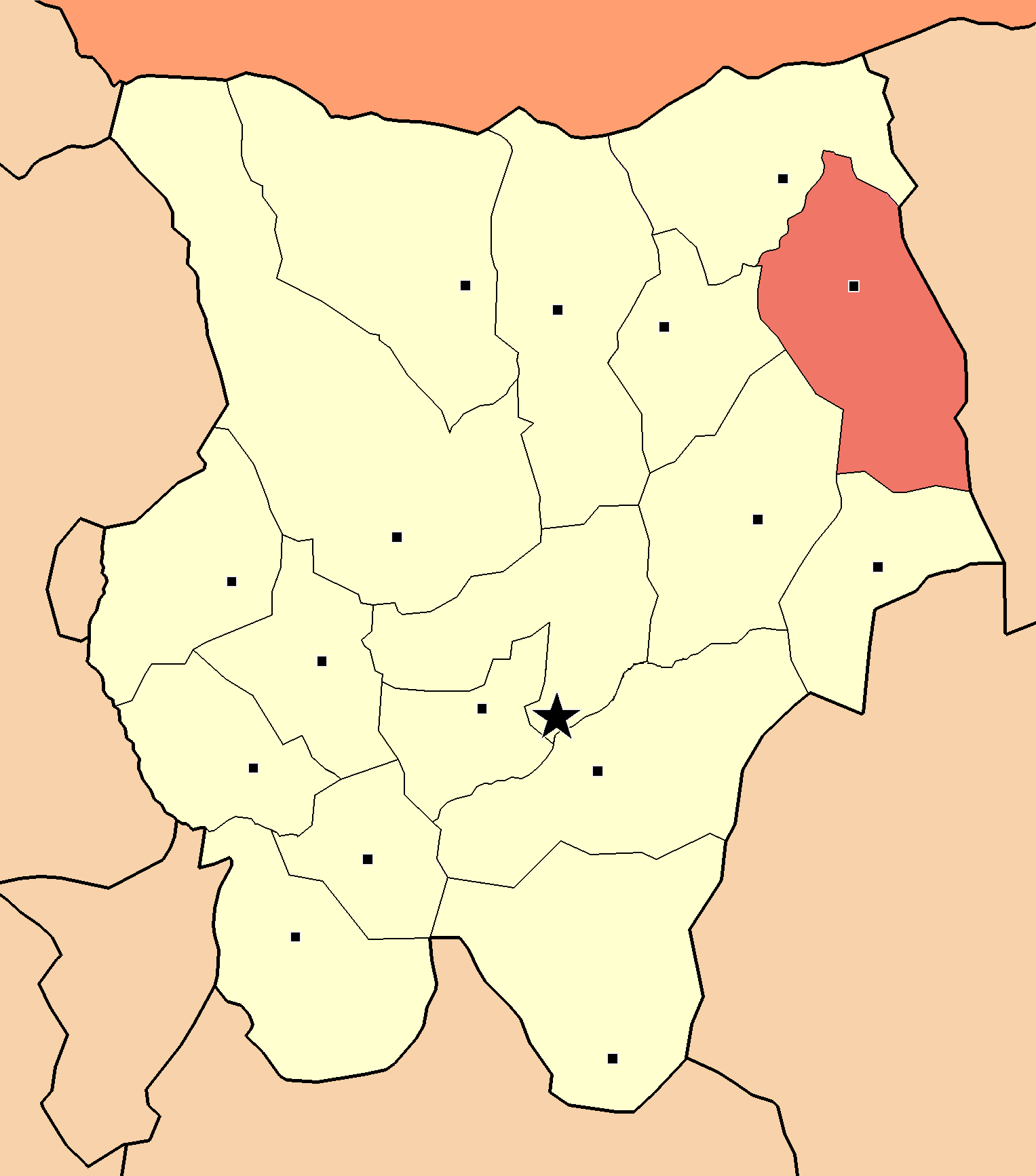
- Location of Norovlin in Khentii Province
- Country: Mongolia
- Province: Khentii Province

Area
  - Total: 5,334 km^{2} (2,059 sq mi)
- Time zone: UTC+8 (UTC + 8)

Norovlin (Mongolian: Норовлин; "Place of Jewels") is a sum (district) of Khentii Province in eastern Mongolia. Bürenkhaan settlement is 40 km northwest of the Norovlin sum center. In 2010, its population was 2,254.

== Administrative divisions ==
The district is divided into four bags, which are:

- Angirt
- Bayan-Ulziit
- Jargalant
- Onon

== Tourist attractions ==
- Shikhikhutag - Ikh zasag Tourism Complex
