= Baldan Bereeven Monastery =

Monastery in Ömnödelger, Khentii, Mongolia

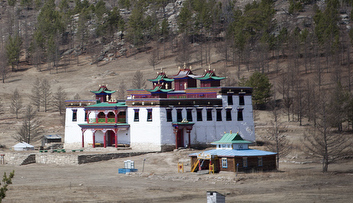

- Location within Mongolia

Religion
- Affiliation: Tibetan Buddhism
- Sect: Gelugpa

Location
- Location: Ömnödelger district, Khentii Province, Mongolia
- Country: Mongolia
- Interactive map of Baldan Bereeven Monastery
- Coordinates: 48°12′8.78″N 109°26′20.41″E

Architecture
- Style: Chinese, Mongol and Tibetan influences
- Founder: lama Tsevendorj
- Completed: 1776

Baldan Bereeven Monastery (Mongolian: Балдан бэрээвэн хийд) is a Gelugpa (Yellow Hat) Buddhist monastery located in the Baruun Jargalant River valley Ömnödelger district, Khentii Province, Mongolia. First established in 1654, the monastery grew to be one of the largest and most important in Mongolia at its height in the mid 19th century, housing up to 8000 monks. The monastery and temple complex were destroyed by Mongolia’s communist regime in 1937.

== Monastery grounds and location ==
Baldan Bereeven is the Mongolian translation of the Tibetan “Drepung (Tibetan: འབྲས་སྤུངས་)”, “pile of rice”, and the monastery was initially modeled after Drepung Monasteries in Tibet and India. Although the original temple complex was demolished during the Stalinist purges of the late 1930s, today three temples have been restored and grounds include the remains of nearly 50 temples, stupas and other religious edifices.

The monastery grounds are surrounded by scenic and sacred mountains including Munkh Ulziit, Arvan Gurvan Sansar, Bayan Baraat, and Bayan Khangai, all part of the Khentii mountain range. The four mountains are said to resemble animals: a lion on the east; a dragon on the south; a tiger on the west; and a Garuda on the north. The monastery itself is backed by the steep cliff of Munkh Ulziit mountain where many cliff carvings, stone carvings with different images of Buddhist gods, inscriptions of religious mantras, and a large Soyombo symbol can be found.

== History ==
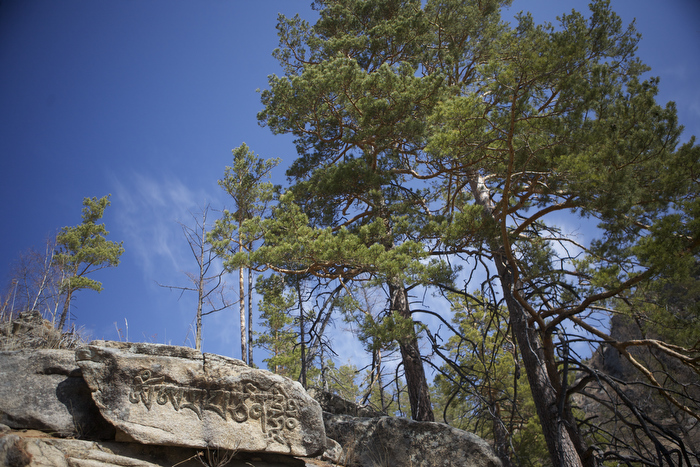
Buddhist rock carvings at Baldan Baraivan Monastery

=== Founding ===
Baldan Bereeven Monastery was founded in 1654 by the lama Tsevendorj with an initial monastic community of around 1500 lamas. According to tradition, Tsevendorj had studied with Zanabazar, the First Bogd Gegeen of Mongolia, in Tibet. Tsevendorj endeavored to create a site similar to Lumbini, the birthplace of the Buddha, in Mongolia to accommodate Mongolian pilgrims who could not travel far. The main temple, called Dash Tsepel Ling, was built in the mid 1700s and was completed in 1776. The Tsogchin Dugan (great hall) Temple was completed in 1813. Architecturally resembling the famous Kumbum Monastery in Tibet. The Tsogchin Dugan was one of the largest buildings in all of Mongolia measuring almost 30 meters by 30 meters and almost 12 meters tall.

By 1850 when its main temple was remodeled, Baldan Bereeven reached its peak as a teaching monastery. It contained four separate colleges and more than twenty temples with a monastic population reaching nearly 8000. Around the year 1900 an epidemic wiped out half of the monastic community leaving between 2000-3000 monks.

=== Destruction ===
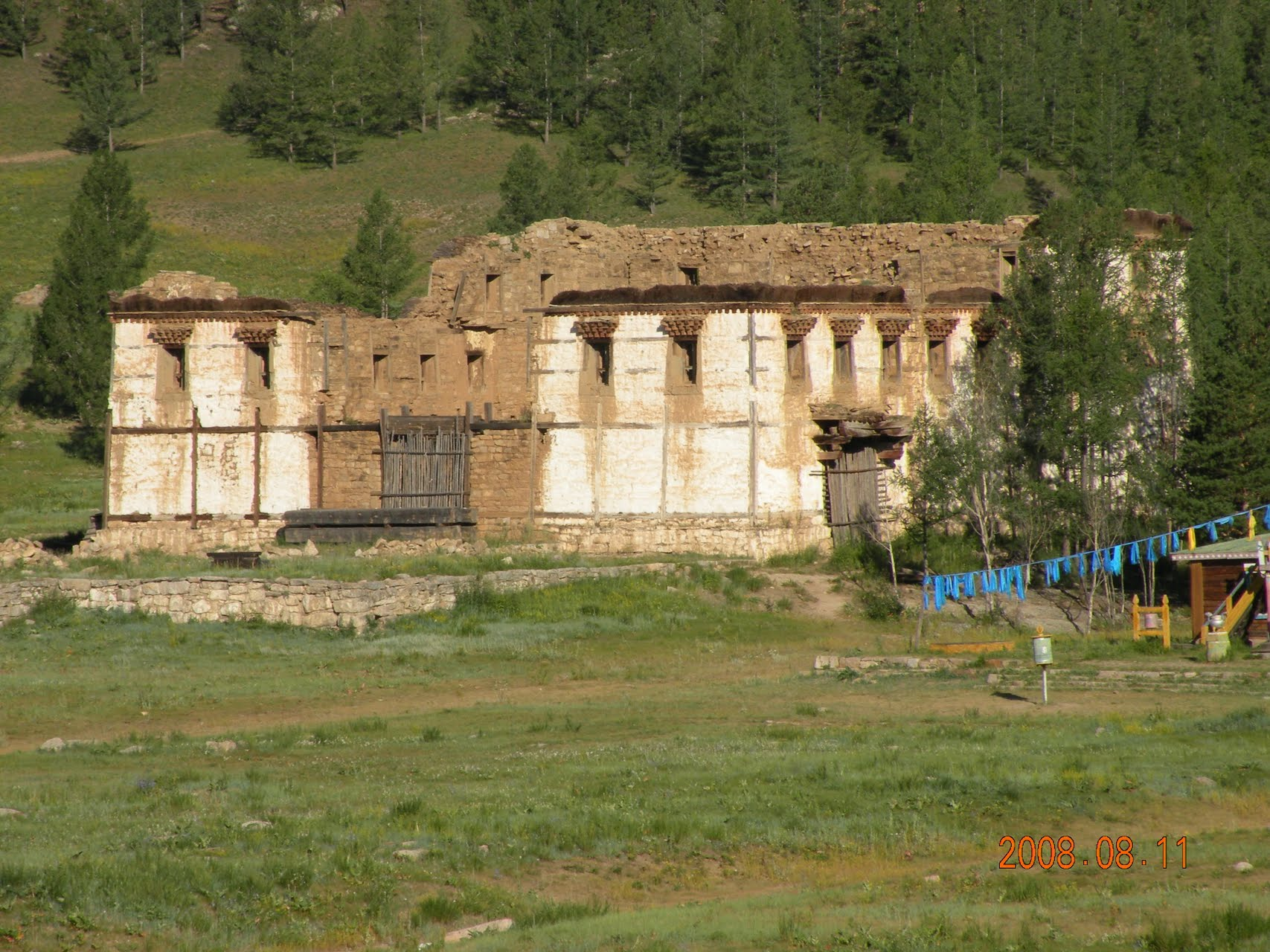
Remains of Baldan Bereeven Monastery in 2008

The monastery’s fortunes suffered further with the establishment of Mongolia’s communist regime in 1921. Many monks were driven from the monastery when large scale persecution of the Buddhist church began in the 1930s. The government expropriated church property, legislated away the church’s independence, and levied high taxes on monasteries. Finally, the monastery was completely razed during Stalinist purges under Mongolia’s strongman Khorloogiin Choibalsan in 1937. Many of the remaining monks were forcibly removed, shot, and buried in mass graves while others were forcibly laicized and sent to labor camps. Younger monks were returned to their families. The monastery’s precious relics were melted down and delivered to the Soviet Union for use during World War II.

=== Restoration ===
The ruins of Baldan Bereeven were off-limits for nearly six decades. Following the democratic revolution in 1990 a handful of older monks who were removed from Baldan Bereevan as young boys in the 1930s returned to the monastery. Restoration efforts for several of the monasteries main temples began in 1999.

In 2012 Baldan Bereeven Monastery and the surrounding area were placed on the tentative list to be nominated as a UNESCO World Heritage Site.
