= Berkh, Khentii =

Town in Batnorov, Khentii, Mongolia

Coordinates: 47°46′59″N 111°09′34″E

Location of Berkh in Mongolia

Berkh (Mongolian: Бэрх) is a town in the Batnorov sum (district) of Khentii Province in eastern Mongolia.

== Population ==
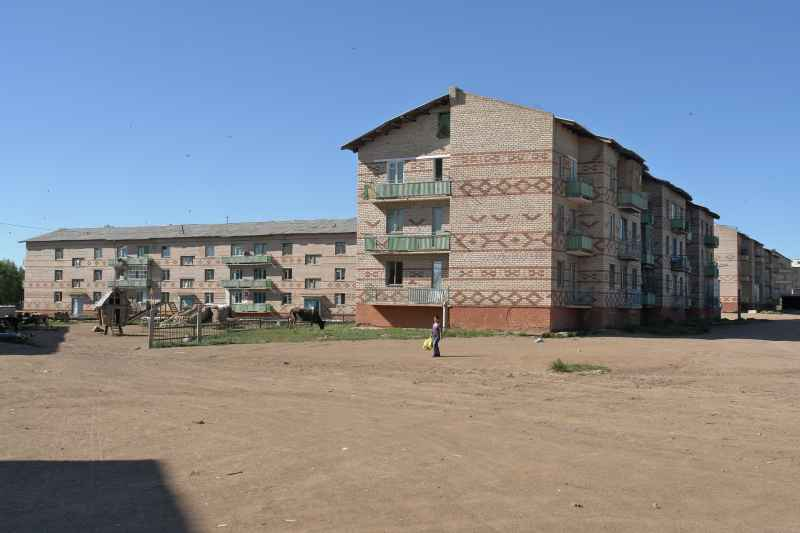
Housing in Berkh, Khentii

Berkh's population is 3,890 (end of 2006).

== Economy ==
The fluorspar mine is in the town.

There are 42,000 heads of livestock in Berh, but they don't have enough pasture land.

== Infrastructure ==
- Berkh Thermal Power Plant
