= Dadal =

District in Khentii Province, Mongolia

Dadal District Дадал сум ᠳᠠᠳᠠᠯᠰᠤᠮᠤ
- District
- General view from the sum

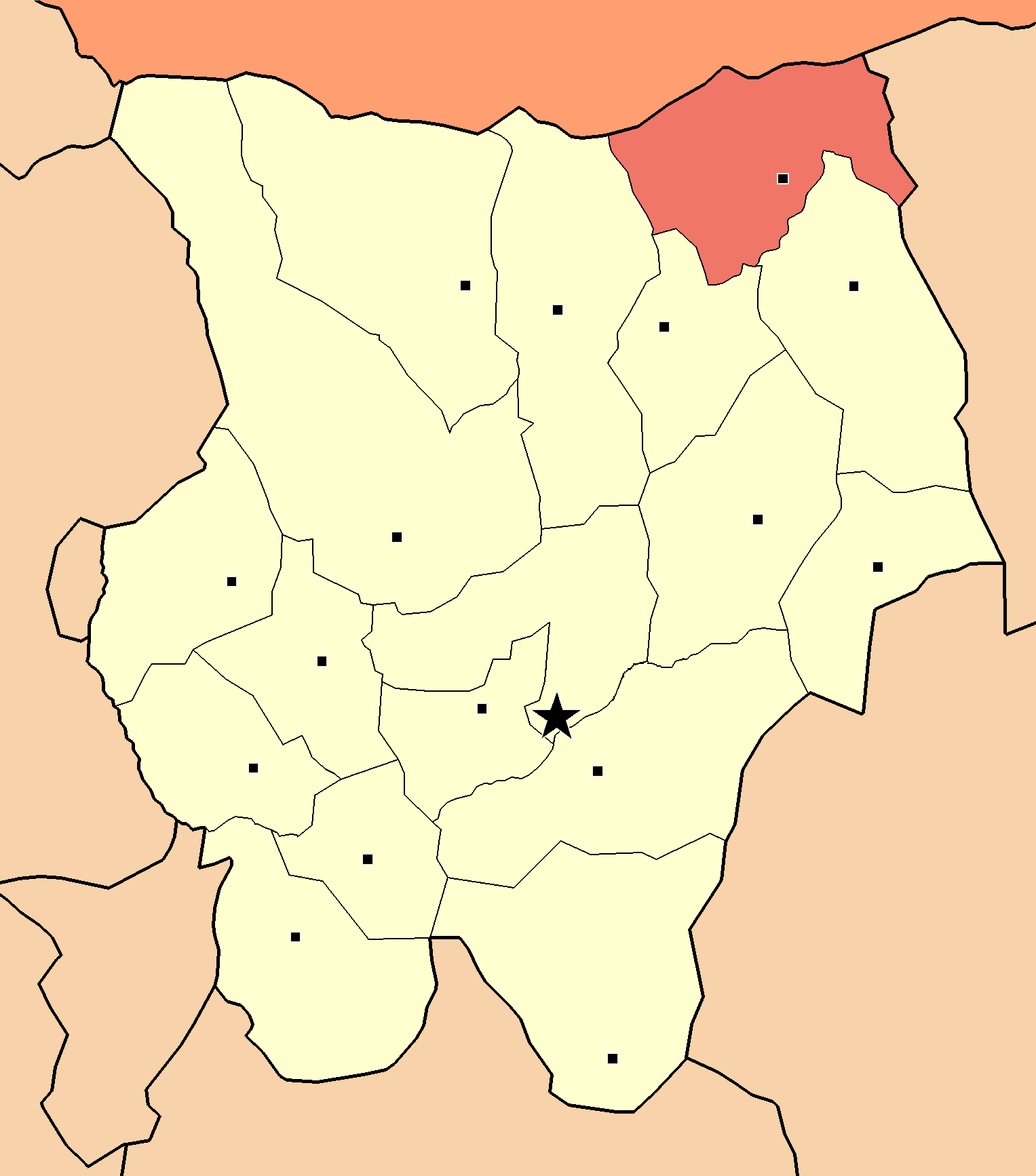
- Dadal District in Khentii Province
- Country: Mongolia
- Province: Khentii Province

Area
  - Total: 4,727 km^{2} (1,825 sq mi)
  - Land: 4,936 km^{2} (1,906 sq mi)

Population (2021)
  - Total: 3,212
- Time zone: UTC+8 (UTC + 8)

Dadal (Mongolian: Дадал "practice," "habit," or "experience") is a sum (district) of Khentii Province in eastern Mongolia. It is named for Dadal Mountain, which is located there.

A major township of the Buryats people, a Mongol people, some of whom that migrated from what is now Russia around the time of the Russian Revolution. The town is made up mainly of neatly maintained log cabins. This is one of several locations within Mongolia that claim to be the birthplace of Genghis Khan (Chinggis Khaan). Dadal is located just to the south of Onon-Balj National Park.

In Dadal people leave in wooden houses, not ger.

Dadal dwellers do not live in Gers like in the rest of Mongolia. Instead they live in wooden house

== Administrative divisions ==
The district is divided into four bags, which are:

- Agats (Агац)
- Balj (Балж)
- Bayan-Ovoo (Баян-Овоо)
- Onon (Онон)

== Transportation ==
- Onon River Bridge
