= Darkhan, Khentii =

District in Khentii Province, Mongolia

Coordinates: 46°37′38″N 109°24′19″E

Darkhan District Дархан сум ᠳᠠᠷᠬᠠᠨᠰᠤᠮᠤ
- District
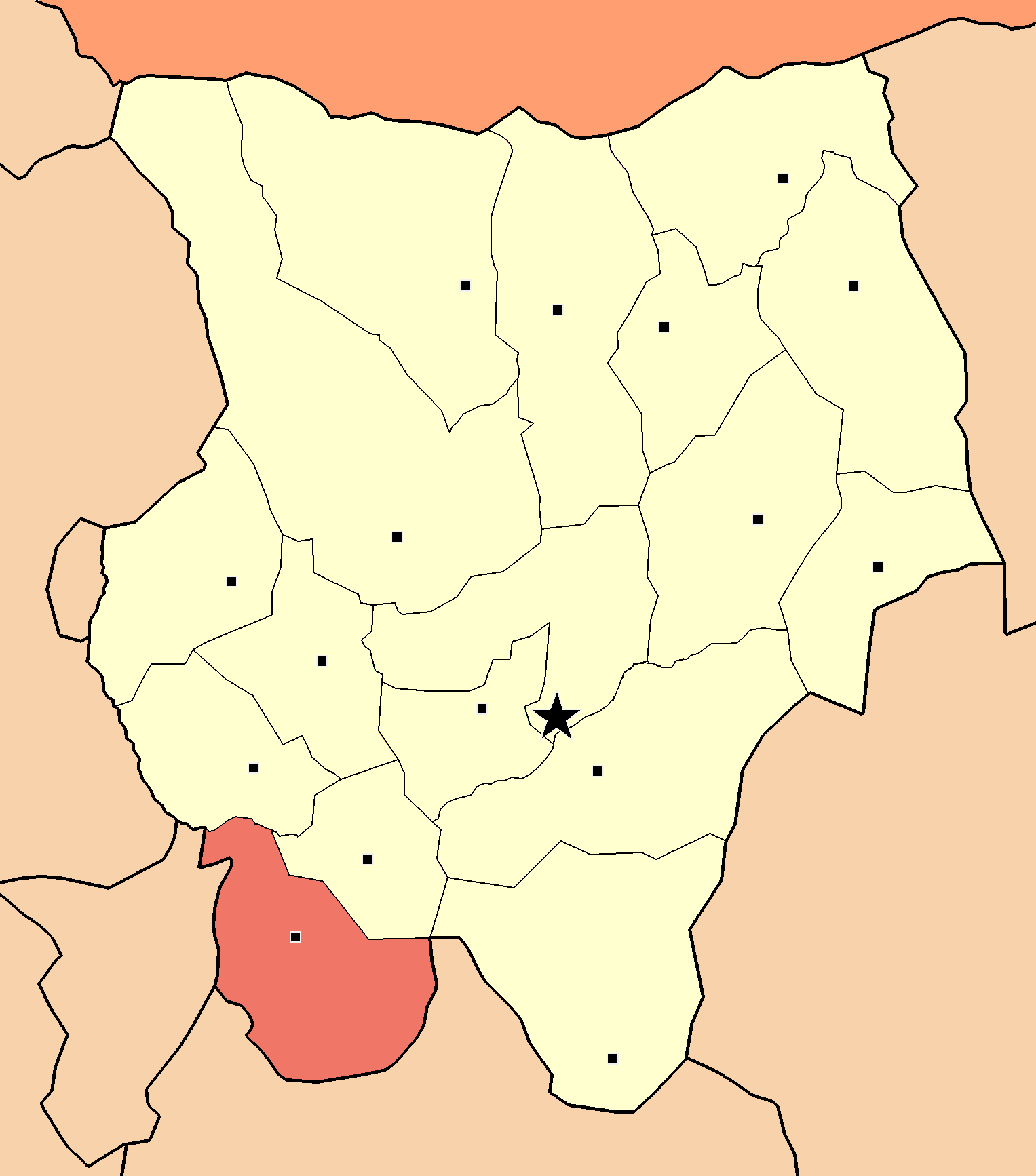
- Darkhan District in Khentii Province
- Country: Mongolia
- Province: Khentii Province

Area
  - Total: 4,455 km^{2} (1,720 sq mi)
- Time zone: UTC+8 (UTC + 8)

Darkhan (Mongolian: Дархан) is a sum (district) of Khentii Province in eastern Mongolia. Bor-Öndör city is 43 km S from the sum center. In 2010, its population was 1,549.

== Administrative divisions ==
The district is divided into four bags, which are:

- Dotuur Bulag (Дотуур булаг)
- Kharaat (Хараат)
- Mergen Khoshuu (Мэргэн хошуу)
- Shajin (Шажин)

== Economy ==
- Bargilt Iron Ore Mine
