= Jargaltkhaan, Khentii =

District in Khentii Province, Mongolia

Coordinates: 47°29′35″N 109°28′22″E

Jargaltkhaan District Жаргалтхаан сум ᠵᠢᠷᠭᠠᠯᠲᠤᠬᠠᠨᠰᠤᠮᠤ
- District
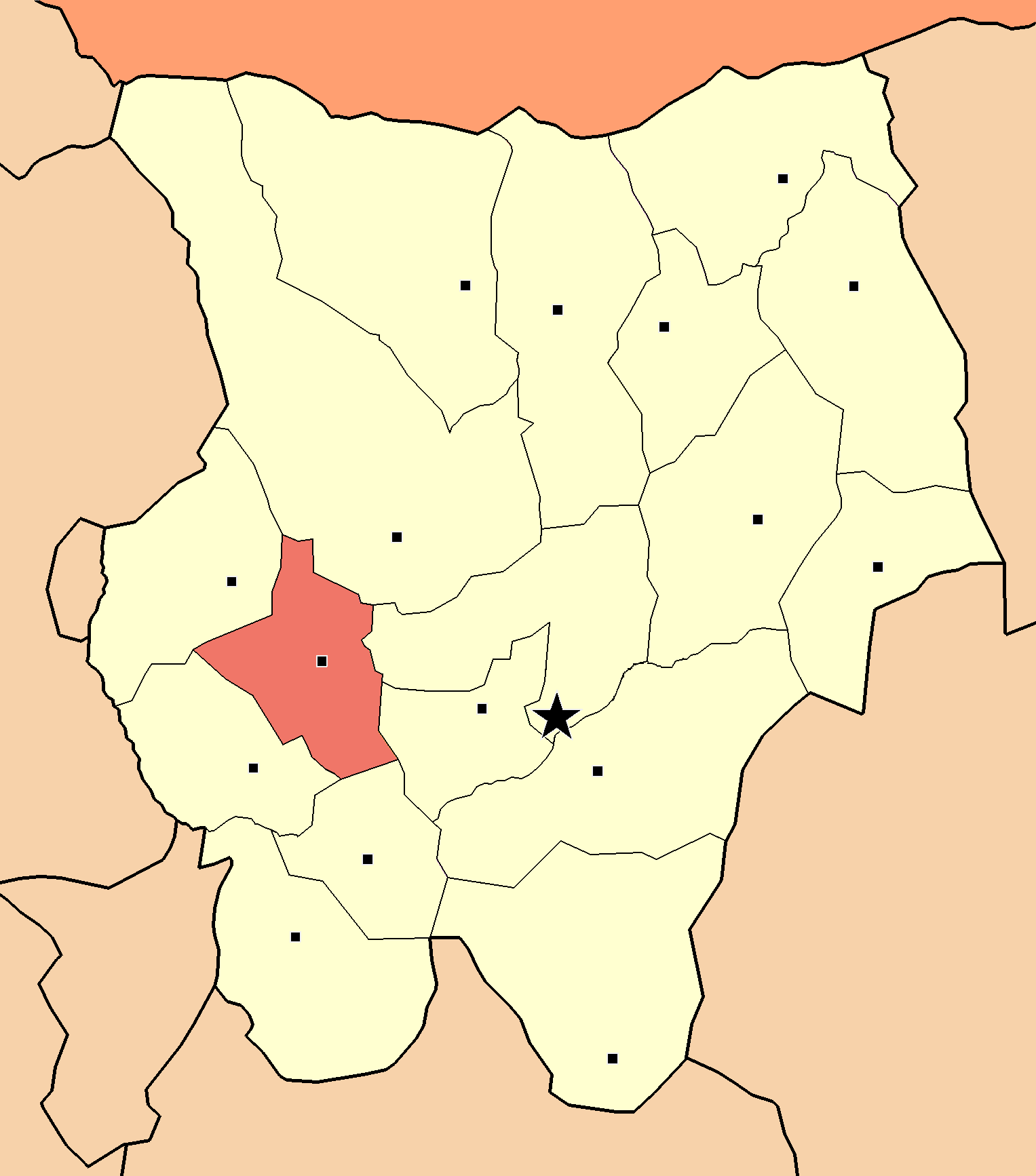
- Jargaltkhaan Districrt in Khentii Province
- Country: Mongolia
- Province: Khentii Province

Area
  - Total: 2,752 km^{2} (1,063 sq mi)
- Time zone: UTC+8 (UTC + 8)

Jargaltkhaan (Mongolian: Жаргалтхаан; "Blissful Khan") is a sum (district) of Khentii Province in eastern Mongolia. In 2010, its population was 1,831.

== Administrative divisions ==
The district is divided into five bags, which are:

- Chuluut
- Bayan-Erdene
- Bayantsogt
- Gichgene
- Tuviin

== Notable people ==
- Byambasürengiin Sharav (1952-) -composer and pianist
