= Batnorov, Khentii =

District in Khentii Province, Mongolia

Coordinates: 47°56′53″N 111°30′01″E

Batnorov District Батноров сум ᠪᠠᠲᠤᠨᠣᠷᠪᠤᠰᠤᠮᠤ
- District
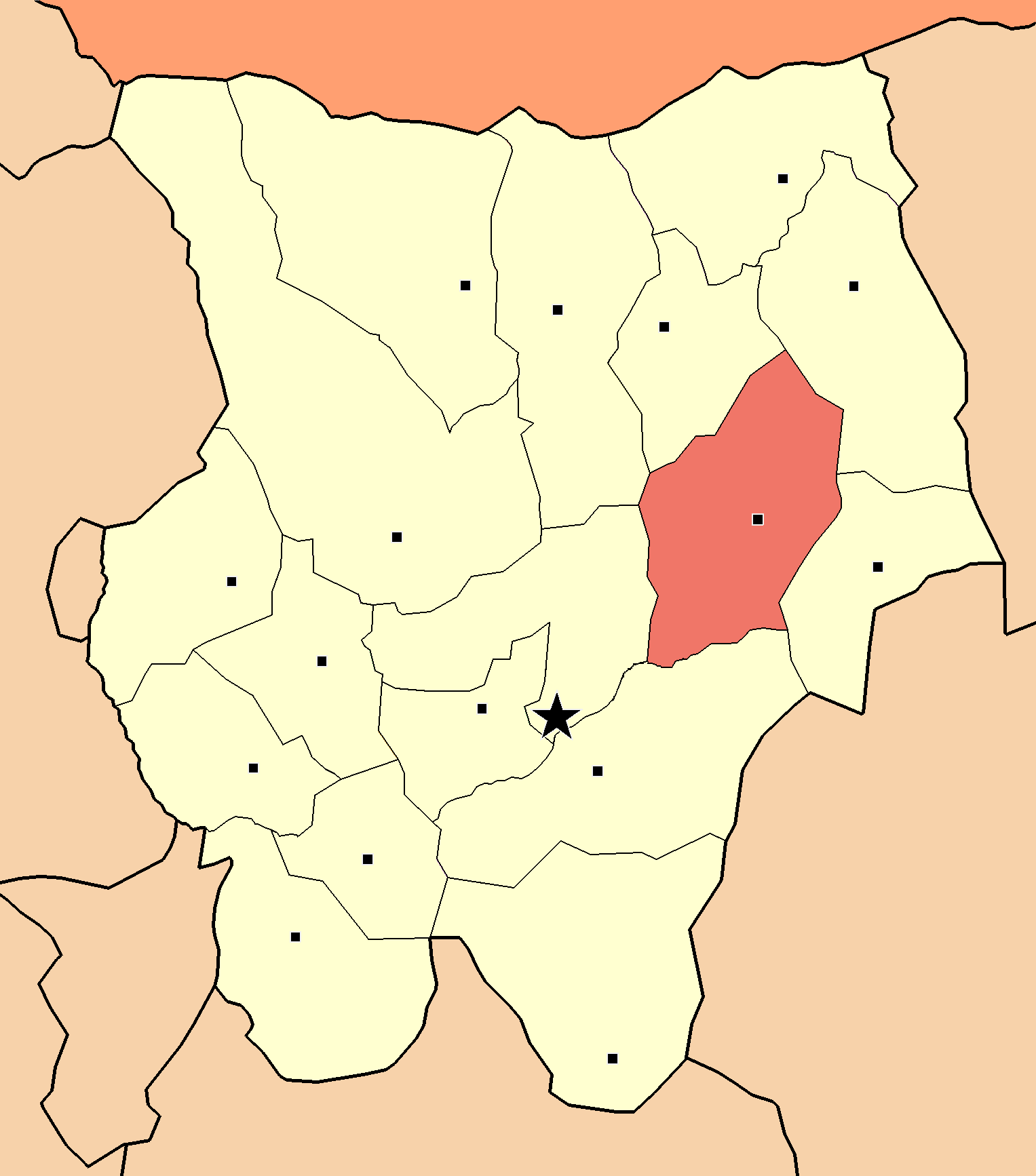
- Batnorov District in Khentii Province
- Country: Mongolia
- Province: Khentii Province

Area
  - Total: 4,968 km^{2} (1,918 sq mi)
- Time zone: UTC+8 (UTC + 8)

Batnorov (Mongolian: Батноров; "Firm Jewel") is a sum (district) of Khentii Province in eastern Mongolia. Berkh town is 35 km SW from Batnorov sum center. In 2010, its population was 2,693.

== Administrative divisions ==
The district is divided into seven bags, which are:

- Bayan (Баян)
- Bayanbulag (Баянбулаг)
- Berkh
- Dundburd (Дундбүрд)
- Ekhenburd (Эхэнбүрд)
- Erdenechandmani (Эрдэнэчандмань)
- Idermeg (Идэрмэг)
