= Ömnödelger, Khentii =

District in Khentii Province, Mongolia

Coordinates: 47°53′16″N 109°48′21″E

Ömnödelger District Өмнөдэлгэр сум ᠡᠮᠦᠨᠡᠳᠡᠯᠭᠡᠷᠰᠤᠮᠤ
- District
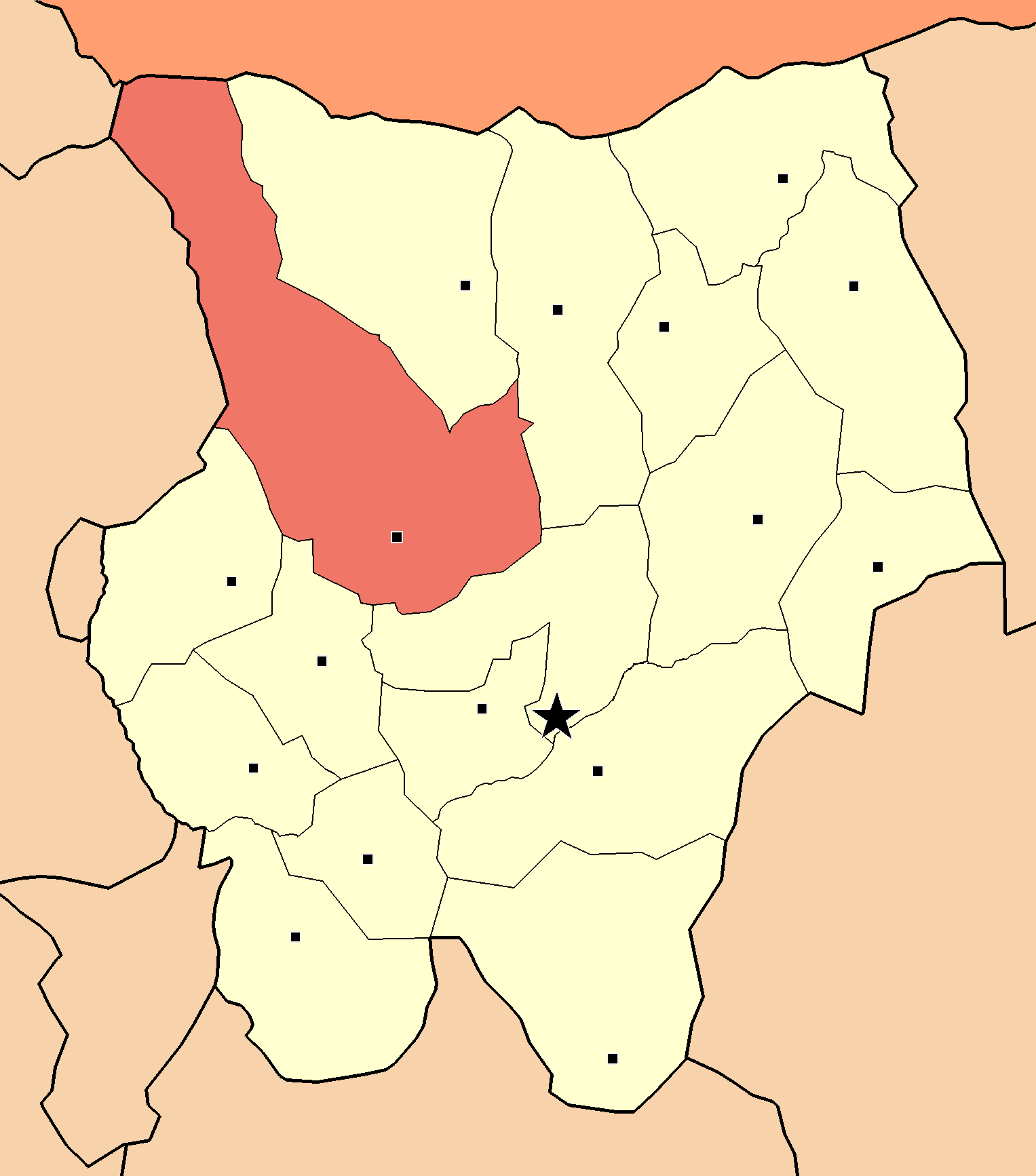
- Location of Ömnödelger in Khentii Province
- Country: Mongolia
- Province: Khentii Province

Area
  - Total: 10,877 km^{2} (4,200 sq mi)
- Time zone: UTC+8 (UTC + 8)

Ömnödelger (Mongolian: Өмнөдэлгэр, "Southern Vastness") is a sum (district) of Khentii Province in north-eastern Mongolia. The former location of the sum's center is at 47 53 N 109 55 E. The town of Gurvanbayan is 52 km northeast of the sum center's current location. In 2010, its population was 5,156.

== Geography ==
Ömnödelger is the largest district in Khentii Province.

== Administrative divisions ==
The district is divided into seven bags, which are:

- Bayanzurkh
- Chandgan
- Gurvanbayan
- Khentii
- Naran
- Taliin bulag
- Tuviin

== Tourist attractions ==
- Baldan Bereeven Monastery
