= Onon, Khentii =

Bag in Khentii, Mongolia

Onon (Mongolian: Онон) (48°37′0″N 110°36′20″E, altitude 1,031 m, time zone UTC+8) is a bag in the Khentii Province of Mongolia, situated at the upper Onon River.

== Climate ==
Climate data for Onon
Month	Jan	Feb	Mar	Apr	May	Jun	Jul	Aug	Sep	Oct	Nov	Dec	Year
Mean daily maximum °C (°F)	−14 (7)	−8 (18)	0 (32)	8 (46)	17 (62)	22 (71)	22 (72)	22 (71)	16 (60)	7 (45)	−5 (23)	−12 (10)	6 (43)
Mean daily minimum °C (°F)	−26 (−15)	−24 (−12)	−16 (3)	−6 (21)	1 (33)	7 (45)	11 (52)	9 (49)	2 (35)	−8 (18)	−19 (−3)	−26 (−14)	−8 (18)
Average precipitation mm (inches)	5.1 (0.2)	0 (0)	13 (0.5)	23 (0.9)	7.6 (0.3)	69 (2.7)	99 (3.9)	99 (3.9)	38 (1.5)	10 (0.4)	7.6 (0.3)	5.1 (0.2)	370 (14.6)
Source: Weatherbase
