= Khentii Province =

Province of Mongolia

Khentii Province Хэнтий аймаг ᠬᠡᠨᠲᠡᠢ ᠠᠢᠮᠠᠭ
- Province
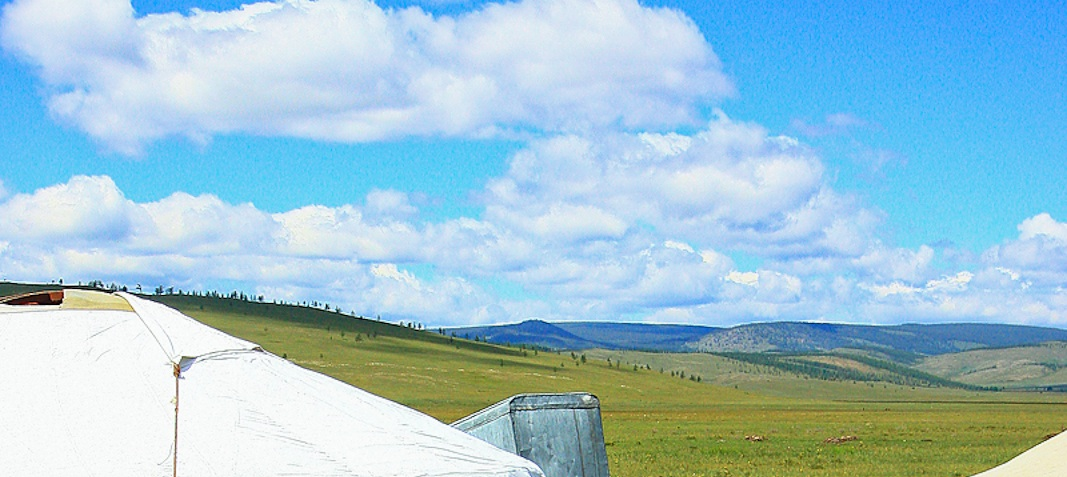

- Flag Coat of arms

- Coordinates: 47°19′N 110°39′E
- Country: Mongolia
- Established: 1930
- Capital: Chinggis City

Area
  - Total: 80,325.08 km^{2} (31,013.69 sq mi)

Population (2025)
  - Total: 79,939
  - Density: 0.99519/km^{2} (2.5775/sq mi)

GDP
  - Total: ▲MNT 878.7 billion US$ 244.36 million (2025)
  - Per capita: ▲MNT 11,107,800; US$ 3,089.1 (2025)
- Time zone: UTC+8
- Area code: +976 (0)156
- ISO 3166 code: MN-039
- Vehicle registration: ХЭ_
- Website: khentii.mn

Khentii (Mongolian: Хэнтий [xe̝ntʰí]), named after the Khentii Mountains, is one of the 21 provinces of Mongolia, located in the eastern part of the country. Its capital is Chinggis City. It is best known as the birthplace (and likely final resting place) of Genghis Khan.

== Geography ==
The aimag borders Russia (Zabaykalsky Krai) to the north. The neighbouring aimags are Selenge to the northwest, Töv to the west, Govisümber to the southwest, Dornogovi to the south, Sükhbaatar to the southeast, and Dornod to the east. The border with Töv is divided by the city of Baganuur, an administrative exclave of Ulaanbaatar.

The northwest of the aimag is covered by the eastern part of the Khentii Mountains; towards the southeast, the landscape changes into the eastern Mongolian steppe plains. The mountain Burkhan Khaldun in the Khan Khentii Strictly Protected Area is considered sacred and assumed to be the birthplace of Genghis Khan.

The Kherlen River originates South of the Burkhan Khaldun; the river then crosses the south of the aimag in the eastern direction after a detour through Töv. A little further east is the spring of the Onon River. The Onon-Balj National Park is located in the northeast of the aimag.

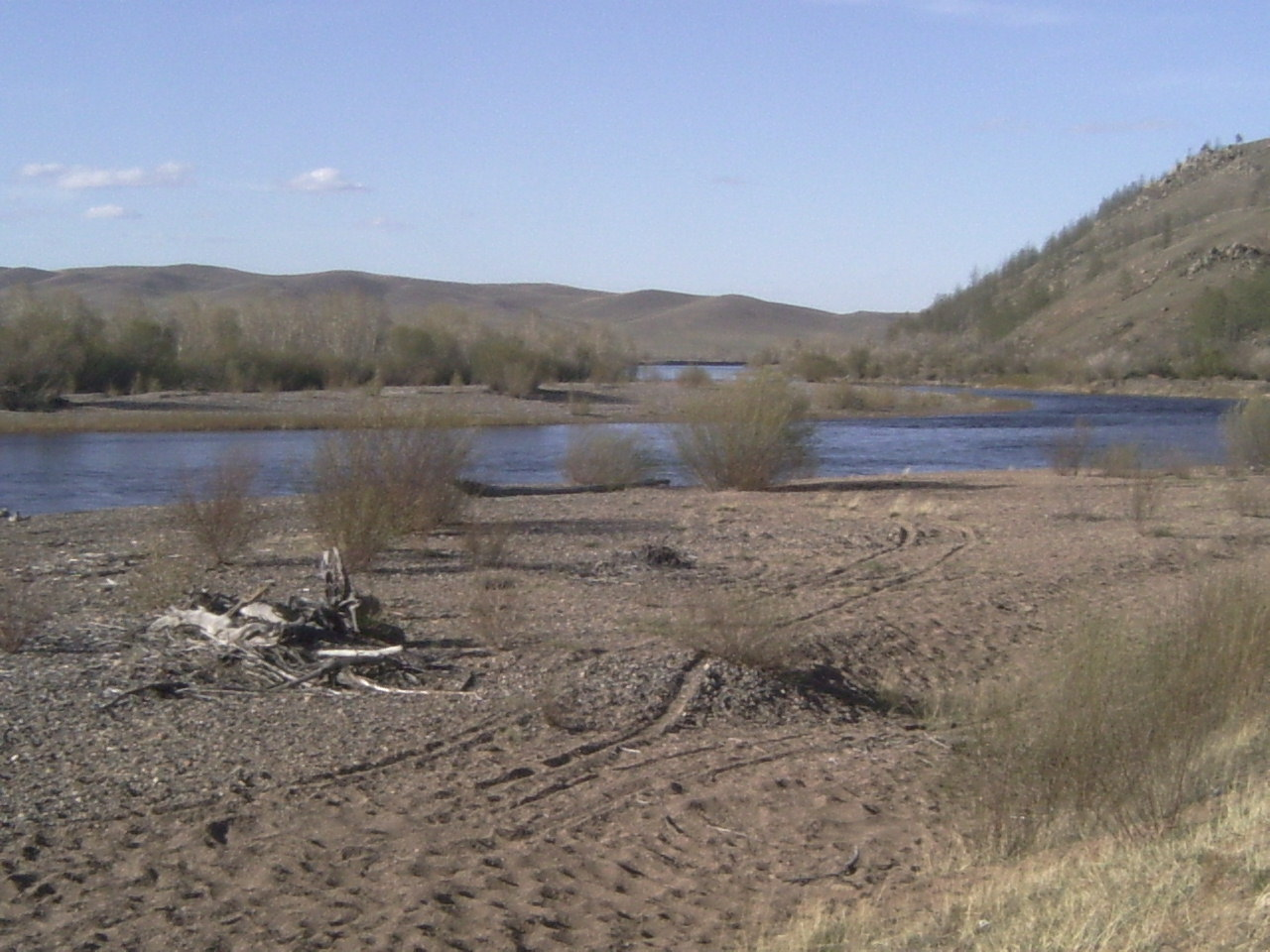
The Onon River in the Khentii Mountains

== Population ==
Ethnic groups of Khentii aimag national censuses data
Ethnic group	Mongolian name	1979	%	1989	%	2000	%	2010	%
Khalkha	Халх	42,883	81.21	57,391	77.76	61,363	86.49	57,072	87.35
Buriad	Буриад	6,550	12.40	7,044	9.54	6,223	8.77	5,477	8.38
Uriankhai	Урианхай	595	1.13	1,004	1.36	951	1.34	779	1.19
Kazakh	Казак (Хасаг)	1,290	2.44	3,655	4.95	629	0.89	463	0.71
Dörvöd	Дөрвөд	154	0.29	208	0.28	186	0.26	371	0.57
Dariganga	Дарьганга	177	0.34	353	0.48	361	0.51	281	0.41
Bayads	Баяд	56	0.11	185	0.25	120	0.17	117	0.18
Darkhad	Дархад	18	0.03	24	0.03	32	0.05	39	0.06
Torguud	Торгууд	37	0.07	19	0.03	16	0.02	17	0.03
Üzemchin	Үзэмчин	18	0.03	8	0.01	3	0.00	8	0.01
Other Mongolian citizens		209	0.40	161	0.22	482	0.68	467	0.71
Foreigners		816	1.55	3,752	5.08	580	0.82	244	0.37
Total		52,803	100.00	73,804	100.00	70,946	100.00	65,335	100.00

== Administrative subdivisions ==
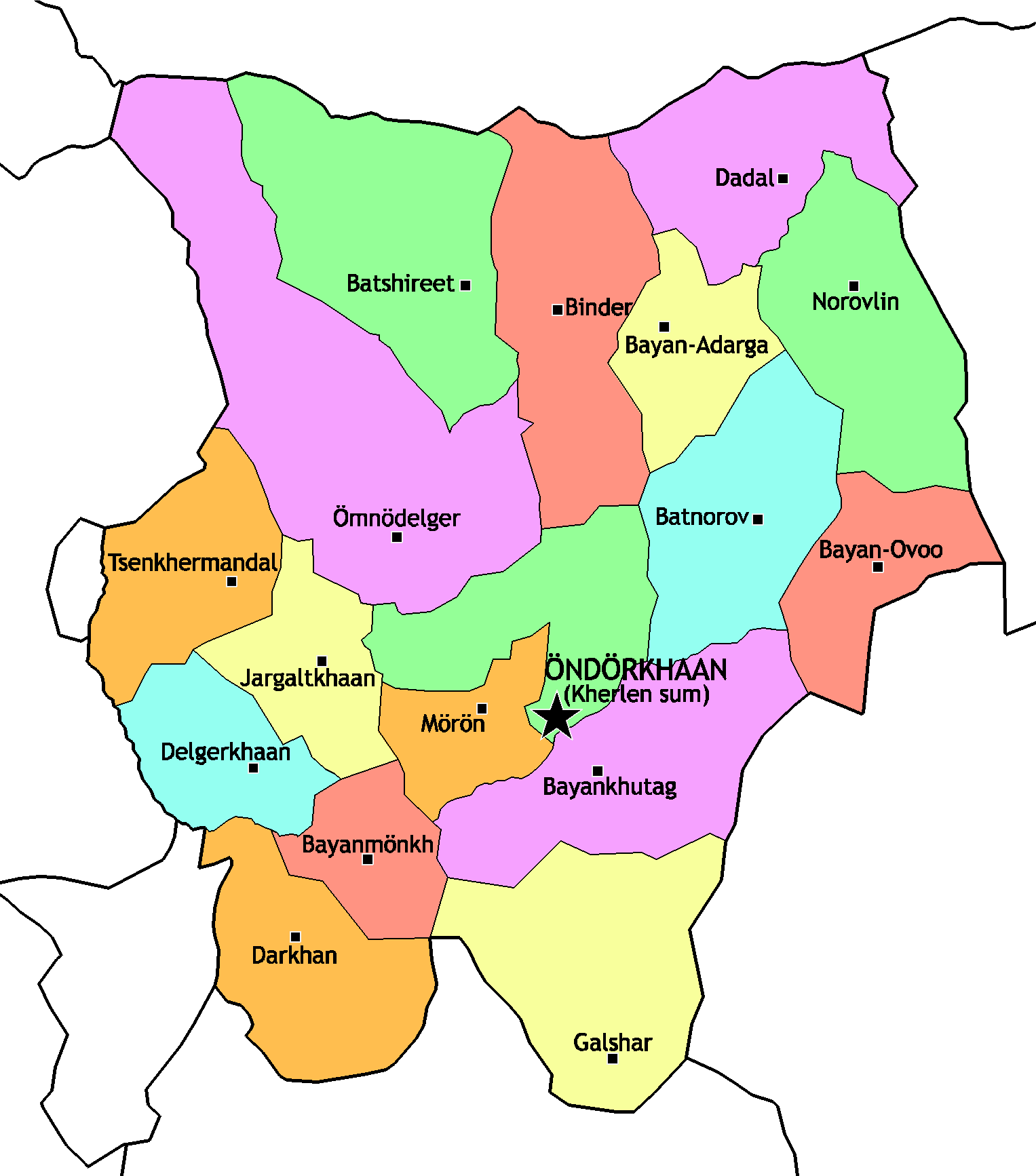
Sums of Khentii aimag

The Cities of Khentii aimag
City	Mongolian	Sum	Population (1994)	Population (2001)	Population (2006)	Population (2007)	Population (2008)	Population (2010)
Berkh	Бэрх	Batnorov	4,517	3,871	3,890	3,673	3,541	2,413
Bor-Öndör	Бор-Өндөр	Darkhan	2,695	6,406	8,510	8,932	8,902	8,080
Chinggis (capital)	Чингис	Kherlen	14,409	~12,000	~14,800	~15,000	~15,000	17,164

The Sums of Khentii aimag
Sum	Mongolian	Population (1994)	Population (2001)	Population (2005)	Population (2008)	Population (2010)	Area (km^{2})	Density (/km^{2})
Batnorov	Батноров	3,169	2,986	6739*	2,833	2,693	4,968	0.54
Batshireet	Батширээт	2,591	2,196	2,009	2,092	2,086	7,018	0.30
Bayan-Adarga	Баян-Адарга	2,493	2,333	2,413	2,429	2,205	3,021	0.73
Bayankhutag	Баянхутаг	2,130	2,280	2,090	1,949	1,656	6,029	0.27
Bayanmönkh	Баянмөнх	1,646	1,790	1,693	1,532	1,347	2,540	0.53
Bayan-Ovoo	Баян-Овоо	1,917	1,697	1,701	1,765	1,581	3,381	0.47
Binder	Биндэр	4,184	3,615	3,537	3,784	3,455	5,386	0.64
Dadal	Дадал	2,826	2,387	2,534	2,667	2,612	4,727	0.55
Darkhan	Дархан	1,949	1,904	9,462**	1,899	1,549	4,455	0.35
Delgerkhaan	Дэлгэрхаан	3,029	2,902	2,339	2,353	2,040	3,986	0.51
Galshar	Галшар	2,575	2,906	2,468	2,074	1,807	6,676	0.27
Jargaltkhaan	Жаргалтхаан	1,863	2,073	1,848	1,926	1,831	2,752	0.67
Kherlen ***	Хэрлэн	20,172	16,578	16,783	17,154	19,000	3,788	5.02
Mörön	Мөрөн	2,444	2,264	2,026	1,934	1,326	2,196	0.60
Norovlin	Норовлин	2,713	2,777	2,255	2,341	2,254	5,334	0.42
Ömnödelger	Өмнөдэлгэр	3,895	5,739	5,208	5,148	5,156	10,877	0.47
Tsenkhermandal	Цэнхэрмандал	2,361	1,791	1,661	1,447	2,004	3,177	0.63

^{*} - including Berkh.
^{**} - including Bor-Öndör.
^{***} - including the aimag capital Chinggis.

== Economy ==
In 2018, the province contributed to 1.26% of the total national GDP of Mongolia.
