= Catholic Church in Mongolia =

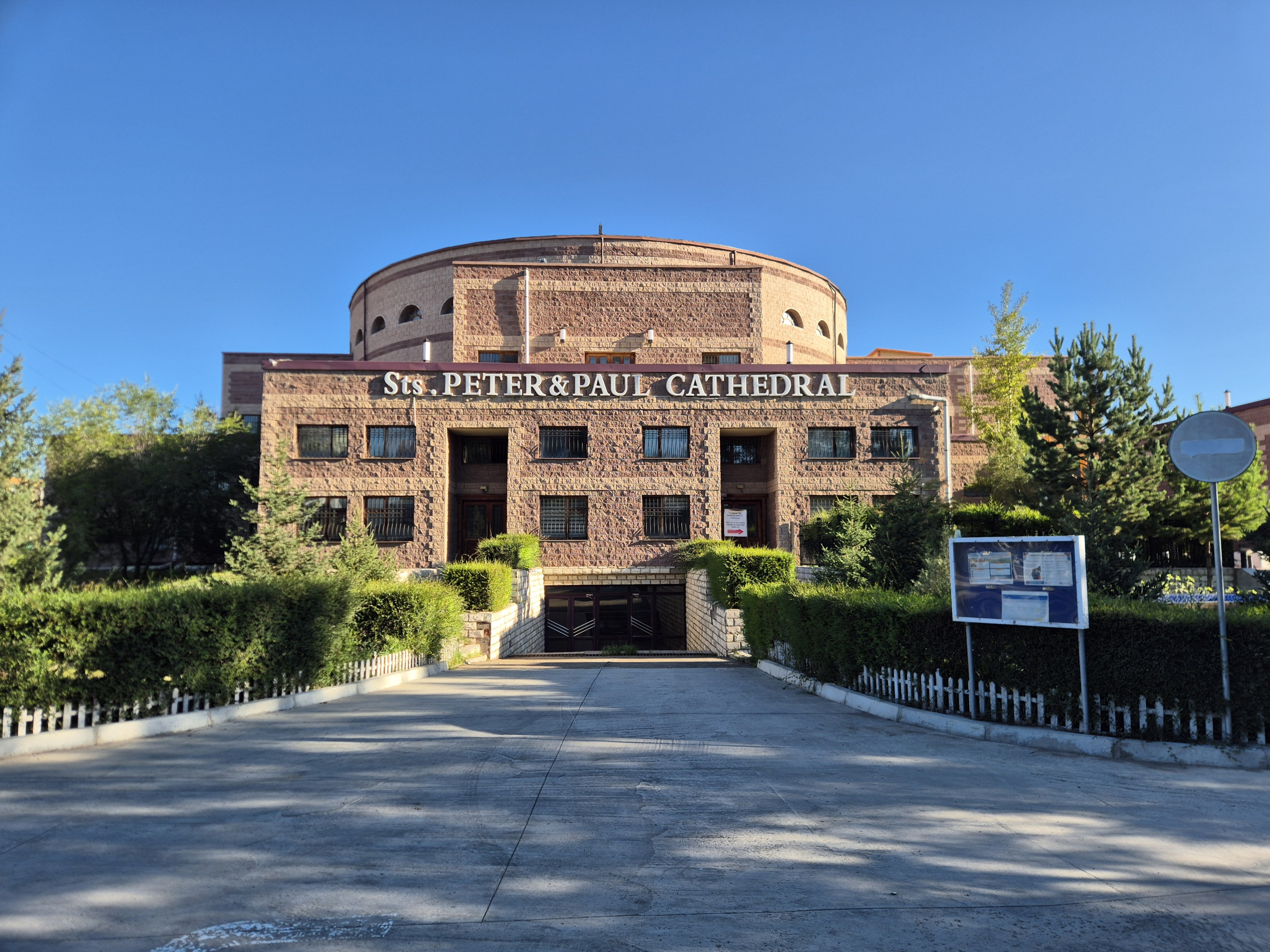
Cathedral of Sts. Peter and Paul in Ulaanbaatar

The Catholic Church in Mongolia is part of the worldwide Catholic Church, under the spiritual leadership of the Pope in Rome.

There were approximately 1,300 Catholics in the country in 2017; they were served by three churches in the capital Ulaanbaatar plus churches in Darkhan, Arvaikheer, Erdenet and mission stations that may grow into churches. That population increased to 1,450 by 2023.

Catholicism was first introduced in the 13th century during the Mongol Empire, but died out with the demise of the Yuan Dynasty in 1368. New missionary activity only set in after the Second Opium War in the mid-19th century. A mission was founded for Outer Mongolia, giving Mongolia its first Catholic jurisdiction, but all work ceased within a year when a communist regime came to power.

With the introduction of democracy in 1991, Catholic missionaries returned and rebuilt the church from scratch. As of 2016, there is an Apostolic Prefecture, a bishop, six churches, and diplomatic relations between the Holy See and Mongolia since 4 April 1992.

== History ==
Christianity in Mongolia has ancient roots. Nestorianism had been practiced since the 7th century, and in the 13th century Western missionaries such as William Rubruck and Giovanni da Pian del Carpine and Armenian King Hethum I visited the region. The leaders of the Mongol Empire were traditionally tolerant of many religions, though Christianity was a key religious influence, primarily through the wives of the Mongolian khans - women from the Church of the East Keraites. John of Montecorvino was a key missionary to Mongol-controlled China during the Yuan Dynasty, translating the New Testament and the Psalms into the Mongol tongue, founding the first Catholic mission in Beijing and becoming its first bishop.

Technically Mongolia had been covered by the Diocese of Peking, and it was not until 1840, when a Vicariate Apostolic was divided from Beijing, that Mongolia had its own Catholic jurisdiction. In 1883, a vicariate for Inner Mongolia was created and then a mission was created for Outer Mongolia in 1922. Freedom of thought and religion were not permitted under communist rule.

=== Mission sui iuris (1991–2003) ===
The new Mongolian Constitution of 1992 guaranteed religious liberty, and missionaries were sent to reconstitute the Church. Missionhurst (the Congregation of the Immaculate Heart of Mary) sent priests Fathers Wenceslao Padilla, Gilbert Sales and Robert Goessens to accomplish this mission once the Vatican had established diplomatic relations with Mongolia. Prior to their arrival, expatriates had been attending Protestant services. Initially, none of the missionaries knew Mongolian, none of the native peoples knew English, and there were no Catholic liturgical texts printed in Mongolian. The first Masses were held in rented apartments and consisted of foreigners working for embassies and foreign aid organizations.

By 1996, Father Wenceslao Padilla and 150 parishioners were on hand at the dedication of the first Catholic Church in Mongolian history. In 1997 the first papal nuncio to Mongolia from the Holy See was named. The new Cathedral of Saints Peter and Paul in Ulaanbaatar is shaped like a traditional ger, with its circular tent shape and walls of thick felt. Fr Wenceslao Padilla was consecrated as the first Bishop of Mongolia on 29 August, 2003 in the Cathedral of Saints Peter and Paul in Ulaanbaatar.

=== Prefecture Apostolic (2003–present) ===
On 23 August 2003, Cardinal Crescenzio Sepe (head of the Vatican Congregation for the Evangelization of Peoples) arrived and consecrated Father Padilla as the first bishop of Mongolia, although the country is not yet a diocese. Pope John Paul II apologized for being unable to attend the opening himself, as he had been planning to visit Mongolia, a first for a pope. He had originally been invited by the President of Mongolia during his visit to the Vatican in 2000. There are now 54 missionaries from various countries helping to build up the Church, and 3 functioning parishes. The arrival of numerous Christian missionaries has been notable since the fall of communism, and Catholicism grew from no adherents in 1991 to over 600 in 2006, including about 350 native Mongolians.

A Mongolian version of the Catholic catechism was printed in mid-2004. It is done in traditional Mongolian writing style and includes common Catholic prayers. Another course offered is how to deal with anger management, in order to help uproot domestic violence. The Verbist Center has taken in 120 street children who had previously been living in Ulaanbaatar's sewer system. Christmas is not a national holiday in Mongolia, as the proportion of the population that is Christian is very low. A fourth parish was founded in 2007 in Darkhan, Mongolia's second-largest city. The first Catholic grotto in Mongolia was dedicated in 2008. Joseph Enkh Baatar became the first Mongolian Catholic to join a seminary for the priesthood in 2008. He was ordained as the first Mongolian deacon in December 2014, and as the first Mongolian priest on 27 August 2016. More than 1,500 people attended the ordination Mass, including nearly 100 priests from South Korea, dignitaries of foreign embassies, those from local Orthodox churches, and Buddhist monks. As of 2016 there were three seminarians for Mongolia studying in Daejeon, South Korea.

Bishop Wenceslao Padilla died on 25 September, 2018 after twenty-six years of service in Mongolia, fifteen of them as bishop. On 2 April 2020, Giorgio Marengo, parish priest of Arvaikheer, was appointed Apostolic Prefect of Ulaanbaatar, and was consecrated bishop on 8 August 2020. Marengo was created a cardinal by Pope Francis on 27 August 2022, becoming the youngest member of the College of Cardinals.

== 2020s ==
In 2020, Catholics made up 0.04% of the population. There were 24 priests and 37 nuns serving 8 parishes. The activities of the church in Mongolia are supported financially with funds collected from the worldwide church and managed by the Pontifical Mission Societies.

In 2023, Pope Francis made the first papal visit to Mongolia for four days, the first time a pope has visited Mongolia. The theme for his visit focused on "hoping together". While there, he opened a homeless persons' clinic.

== Legal restrictions ==
People under the age of 16 can only receive catechesis with written parental consent and professions of faith are only allowed in church buildings. Priests may not dress in clerical clothing in public.

== See also ==
- Religion in Mongolia
- Christianity in Mongolia
