= Protestantism in Mongolia =

Protestant Christian churches in Mongolia include Lutherans, Presbyterians, Seventh-day Adventists and various evangelical Protestant groups.

In 2020, Protestants made up 1.10% of the country's population.

Protestant Christian teaching did not reach Mongolia until the mid-19th century, brought by missionaries such as James Gilmour. The rise of a communist government in the 1920s meant an end to Protestant Christian missions. However, since the end of communism in 1990, Protestant missionaries have become active again.

Mongolia has a local Christian television station, Eagle TV, and a pro-Christian radio station called Family Radio.

The first Seventh-day Adventist Church was established through the efforts of American missionaries starting in 1991. According to the 2015 yearbook, the Mongolia Mission had five churches, 2107 members and a language school in Ulaanbaatar.

== See also ==
- Religion in Mongolia
- Christianity in Mongolia
