= Christianity in Mongolia =

Christianity is a minority religion in Mongolia. There has been a Christian presence in Mongolia since the 7th century, but most of the contemporary Christians in the country became Christian after the Mongolian Revolution of 1990. According to the Christian missionary group Mission Eurasia, the number of Christians grew from less than 40 in 1990 to around 40,000 meeting in 600 different churches in 2025.

== Statistics ==
According to the 2010 National Census there were 41,117 Christians (age of 15 and older) or 2.1% of total population. In 2020, Christians made up 1.94% of the population.

== Nestorianism ==
In the 7th century, Nestorianism was the first form of Christianity to be proselytized among the Mongols, although it was a minority religion and remained so. However, it had great philosophical influence on other Mongolian spiritual traditions, such as Buddhism and shamanism.

During the rise of the Mongol Empire in the 13th century, the Great Khans, though mostly Shamanists and Buddhist, were religiously tolerant towards the Nestorian Christians, Muslims, and Manichaeans. Many of the khans had Nestorian Christian wives from the Kerait clan, who were extremely influential in the Mongol court. During the rule of Möngke Khan, Christianity was the primary religious influence. After the breakup of the Mongol Empire in the 14th century, Nestorian Christianity nearly disappeared from the region.

There are only very few archeological traces of the prospering of Nestorianism among the Mongols. In Inner Mongolia, several Nestorian gravestones have been recorded in the past, but none now remain in situ.

== Syncretic Christianity ==
Some Mongolians rejected the church structure and what was orthodox for the time, and borrowed elements from other religions and merged beliefs from several Christian denominations together. Some even identified Adam with the Buddha.

Syncretism along these lines influenced the way Chinese, Mongolian, and Tibetan Buddhism developed, and the effects of it can still be observed in the modern forms of these traditions.

== Eastern Orthodoxy ==
The Orthodox Churches and their monks became victims to the Mongol invasion of Eastern Europe in the early 13th century. However, jarlig, or charter of immunity, also contributed to the strengthening of the Church. With the reign of Möngke-Temür, a jarlig was issued to Metropolitan Kirill for the Orthodox Church in 1267. While the church had been under the de facto protection of the Mongols ten years earlier (from the 1257 census conducted under Khan Berke), this jarlig formally decreed protection for the Orthodox Church. More importantly, it officially exempted the church from any form of taxation by Mongol or Russian authorities and permitted clergymen to remain unregistered during censuses and clergy were furthermore not liable for forced labor or military service. For the first time, the Orthodox Church would become less dependent on princely powers than in any other period of Russian history.

From 1771 to 1845 at least eight missions of the Russian Orthodox Church visited Mongolia. The first Orthodox church on Mongolian territory, Holy Trinity Church was established in the Khalkha capital city Urga in 1872, and newly rebuilt there in 2007.

== Catholicism ==
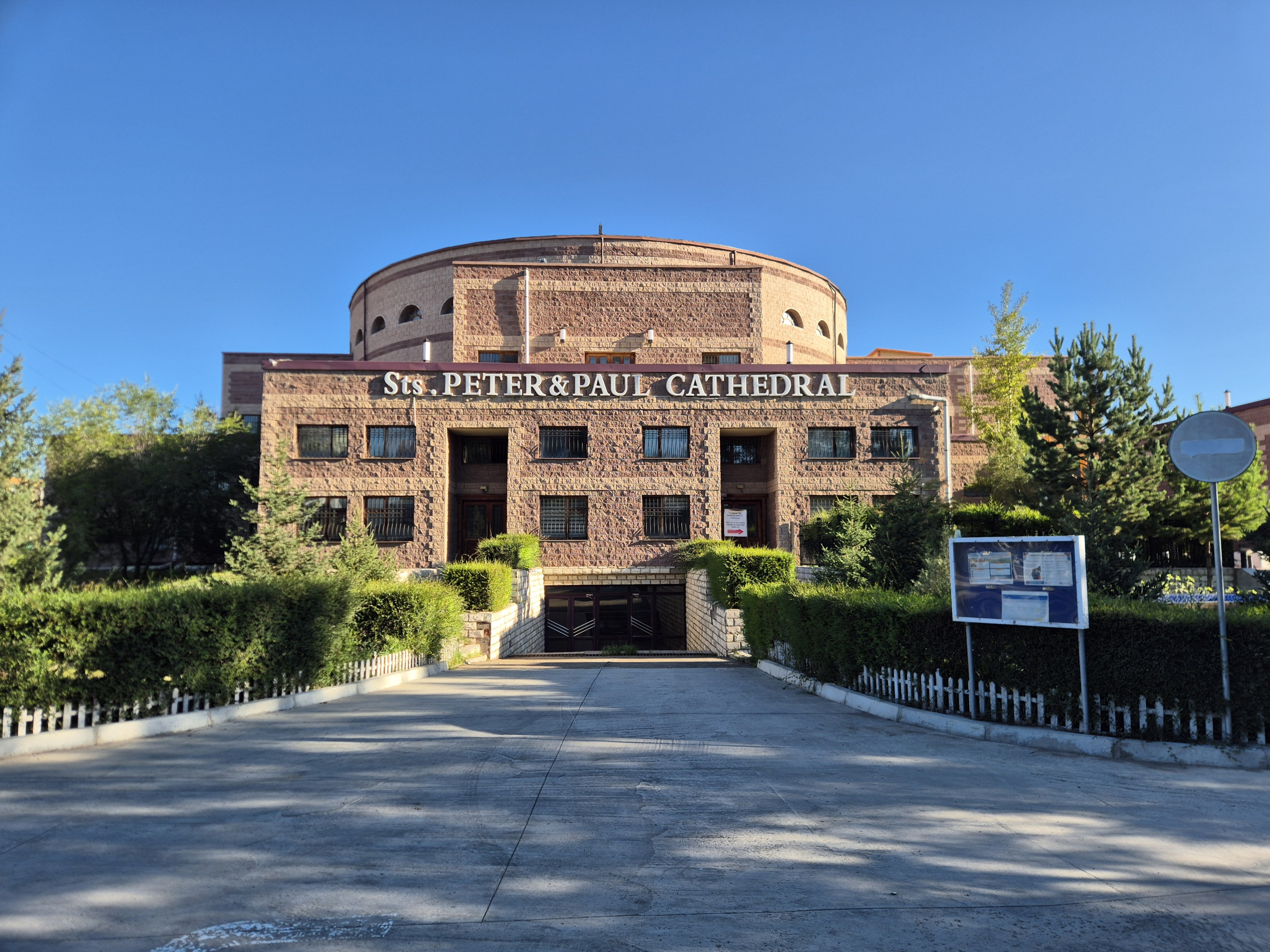
Saints Peter and Paul Cathedral

Historically, much of Europe had been ruled by Turkish and Mongolian tribes, both of which originated in Mongolia. The Eastern Roman Empire was conquered by the Ottoman Turks in the 15th century.

Western Catholicism was first introduced in the Middle Ages, primarily through Franciscan and Dominican missionaries, sent to the Mongol court in Karakorum and also via medieval Catholic missions in China. Missionaries to China were successful during the Mongol-created Yuan Dynasty in China in the late 13th/early 14th centuries. However, after the native Chinese Ming Dynasty overthrew the Yuan Dynasty in 1368, Christians were expelled from China. Many Mongols in the western part of the Empire converted to Islam, and with the collapse of the entire Mongol Empire in the 14th century, Christianity nearly disappeared from Central Asia, only reappearing after the Second Opium War in the mid-19th century. In time, a mission was founded for Outer Mongolia, giving Mongolia its first Catholic jurisdiction, but all work ceased within a year when the Mongolian People's Republic was established and freedom of thought and religion were no longer permitted.

After the Mongolian Revolution of 1990, Catholic missionaries returned and rebuilt the church from scratch. As of 2006, there is an Apostolic Prefecture, a bishop, and three churches. Diplomatic relations have existed between the Holy See and Mongolia since 1992. Pope John Paul II once planned to visit Mongolia along with Kazan, but he eventually cancelled the trip, supposedly explaining to a Russian newspaper that "Our Lord does not want it". As of 2022, there were 1,394 Catholics in the Apostolic Prefecture of Ulaanbaatar, headed by Cardinal Giorgio Marengo, I.M.C. as Prefect and organized into 8 parishes. On September 1st, 2023, Pope Francis visited Mongolia, meeting with President of Mongolia Ukhnaagiin Khürelsükh, who was gifted an authenticated letter from former Khan Güyük (1246–1248) demanding the submission of Pope Innocent IV to the Mongol Empire.

== Protestantism ==
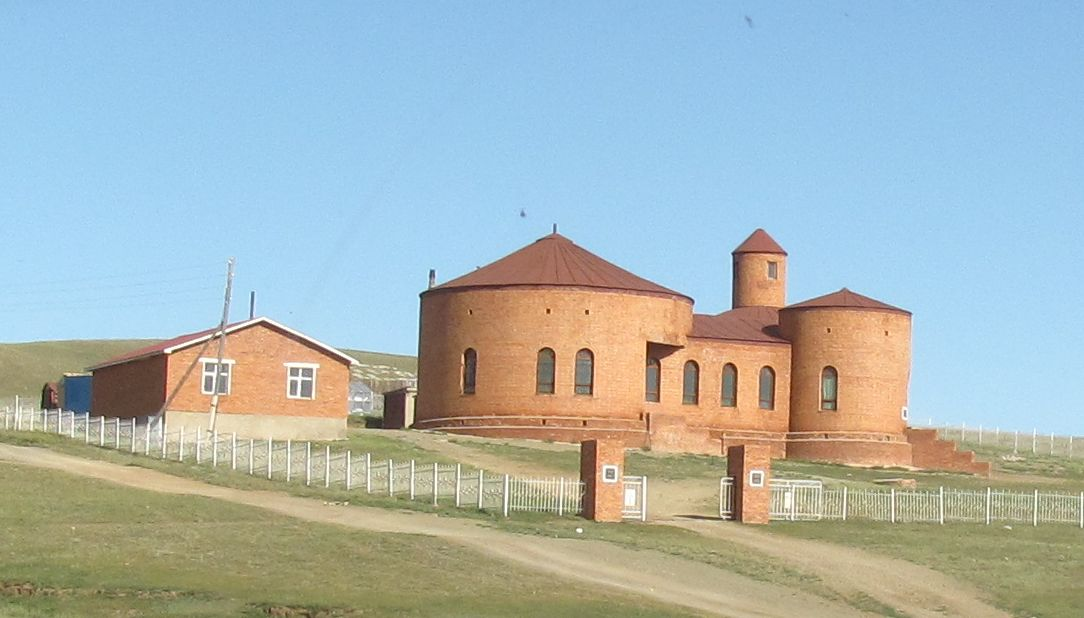
Protestant church in Zuunmod, Töv Province

Most Christians in Mongolia today are Protestant, and most have become Christians since the Mongolian Revolution of 1990. Mongolia has a local Christian TV station, Eagle Television, and a pro-Christian radio station, Family Radio.

== The Church of Jesus Christ of Latter-day Saints ==
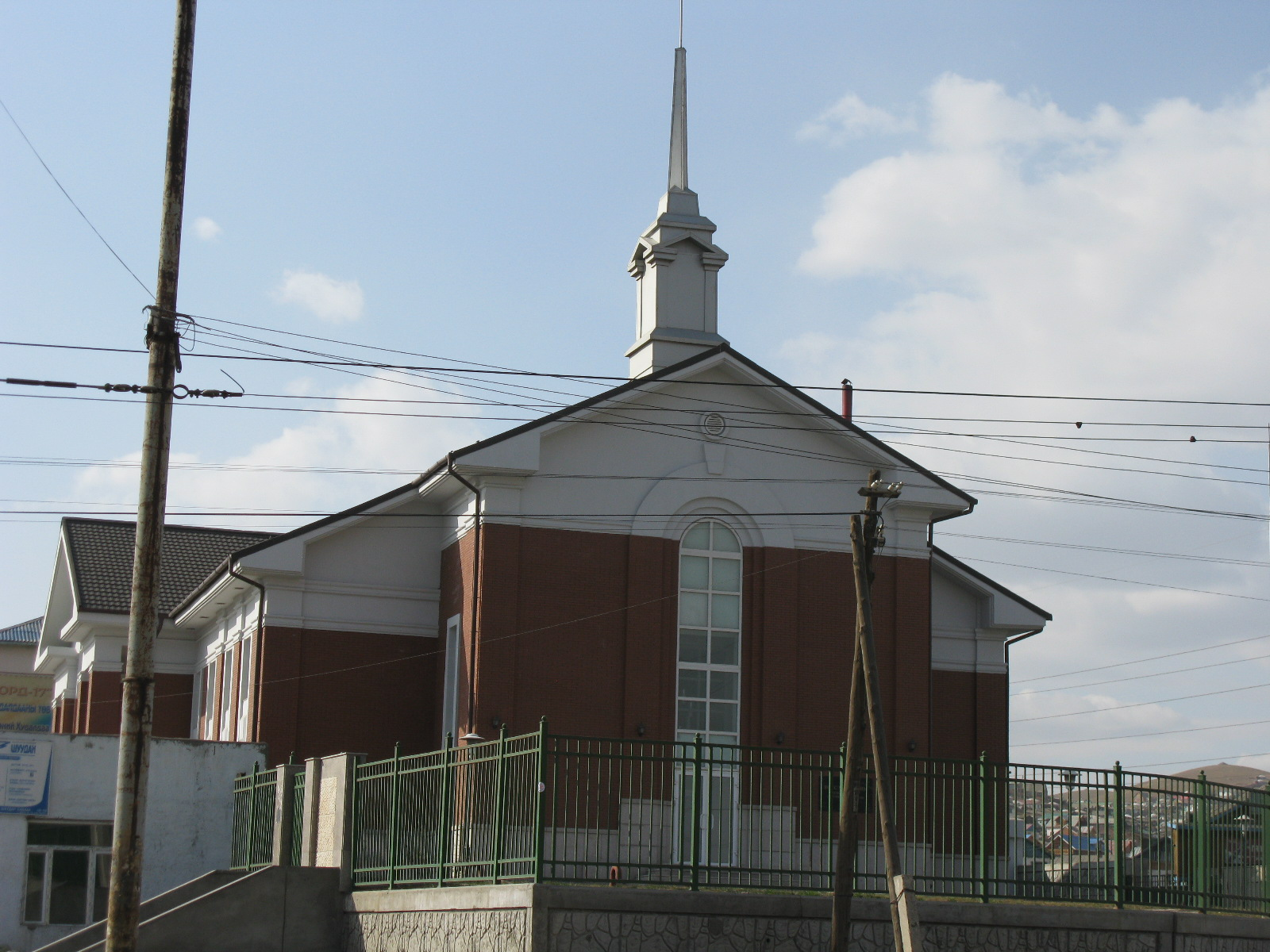
An LDS Church meetinghouse in Ulaanbaatar, Mongolia

In 1992, six missionaries of the Church of Jesus Christ of Latter-day Saints arrived in Mongolia as English teachers. In 1995, the Mongolia Ulaanbaatar Mission was established with Richard Cook as the first mission president. The Ulaanbaatar Mongolia West Stake with six congregations was formed in 2009 growing to nine congregations by May 2016. The Ulaanbaatar Mongolia East Stake was created in May 2016 with six congregations. About 2010 new visa laws went into effect limiting foreigners causing many of the foreign Church of Jesus Christ of Latter-day Saints missionaries to be reassigned to other countries. There were, however, about 110 Mongolian missionaries serving full time missions inside Mongolia. By the end of 2015, the Church of Jesus Christ of Latter-day Saints had 11,250 members in twenty-three congregations.

== See also ==
- Religion in Mongolia
- Christianity in Inner Mongolia
