= Religion in Mongolia =

Religion in Mongolia (census 2020)
1. Buddhism (51.7%)
2. No religion (40.6%)
3. Islam (3.20%)
4. Mongolian shamanism (2.50%)
5. Christianity (1.30%)
6. Other religions (0.70%)

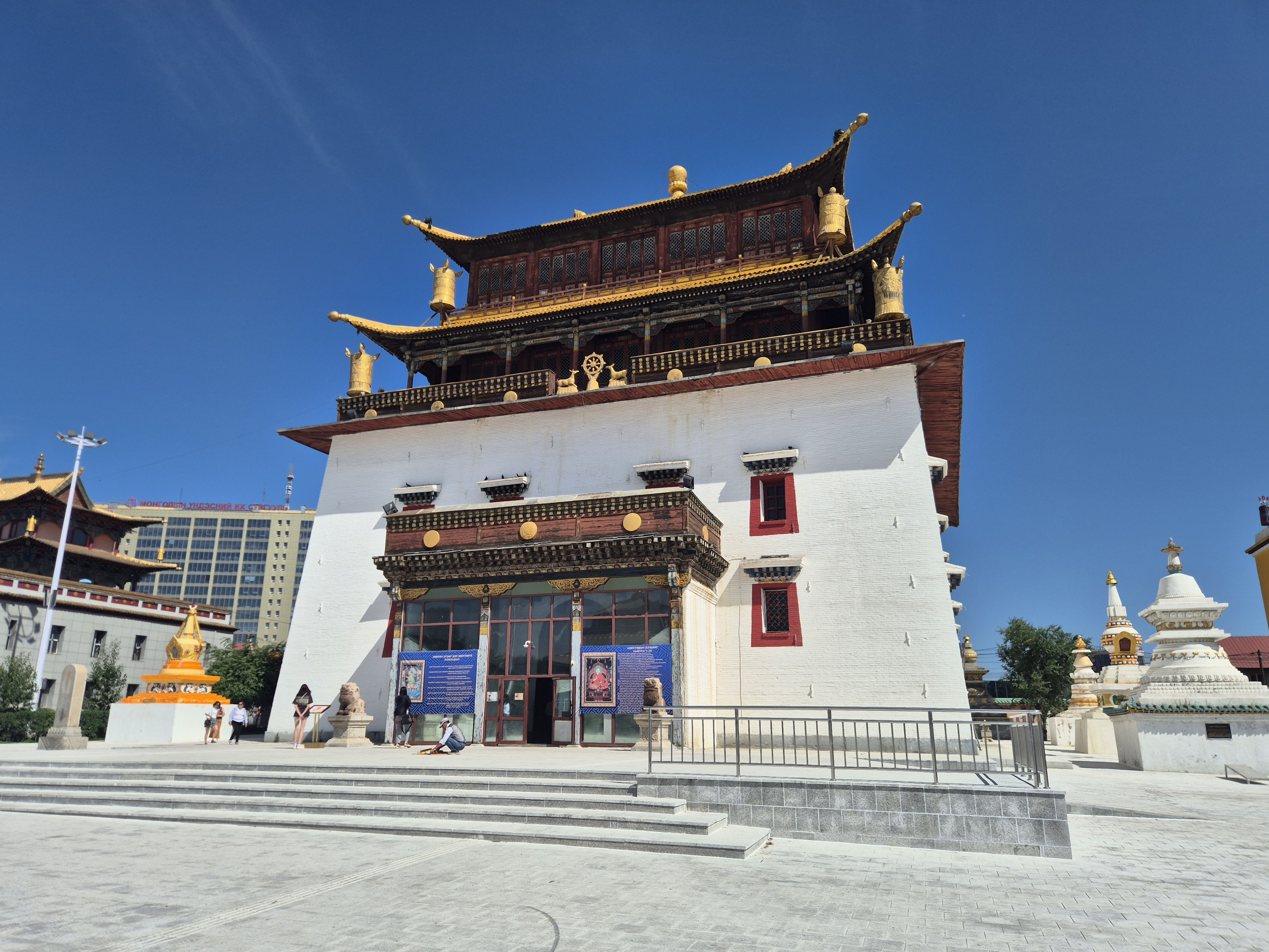
Megjid Janraisig Temple, the main temple of Gandantegchinlen Monastery, the major monastery of Mongolian Buddhism located in Ulaanbaatar.

Religion in Mongolia has been traditionally dominated by the schools of Mongolian Buddhism and by Mongolian shamanism, the ethnic religion of the Mongols. Historically, through their Mongol Empire, the Mongols were exposed to the influences of Christianity (Nestorianism and Catholicism) and Islam, although these religions never came to dominate. During the communist period of the Mongolian People's Republic (1924–1992) all religions were suppressed; however, with the transition to the parliamentary republic in the 1990s, there has been a general revival of faiths.

According to the national census of 2020, 51.7% of the Mongolians identify as Buddhists, 40.6% as non-religious, 3.2% as Muslims (predominantly of Kazakh ethnicity with small Khoton population) 2.5% as followers of the Mongol shamanic tradition, 1.3% as Christians, and 0.7% as followers of other religions.

== Demographics ==
Religion	2010		2020	
Religion	Number	%	Number	%
Buddhism	1,459,983	53.0	1,704,480	51.7
Islam	82,641	3.0	105,500	3.2
Mongolian shamanism	79,886	2.9	82,422	2.5
Christianity	60,603	2.2	42,859	1.3
Other religion	11,019	0.4	23,078	0.7
Non-religious	1,063,308	38.6	1,338,528	40.6
Total population	2,754,685	100	3,296,866	100

== Main religions ==
=== Buddhism ===
Buddhism was introduced in Mongolia as early as the 1st century CE. The Mongols returned to indigenous shamanic traditions after the collapse of the Mongol Empire, but Buddhism reemerged in the sixteenth and seventeenth centuries. During the communist Mongolian People's Republic (1924–1992), Buddhism was suppressed with an estimated 17,000 monks being killed under the regime, official figures show. After the collapse of communism in the 1990s, there has been a resurgence of Buddhism in the country, both within the fold of the traditional monastic institution and through the spread of New Age-inspired and monotheism-inspired new religious movements of Buddhism. According to the 2020 census of Mongolia, 51.7% of the population, that is 1,704,480 people, are adherents of Buddhism.

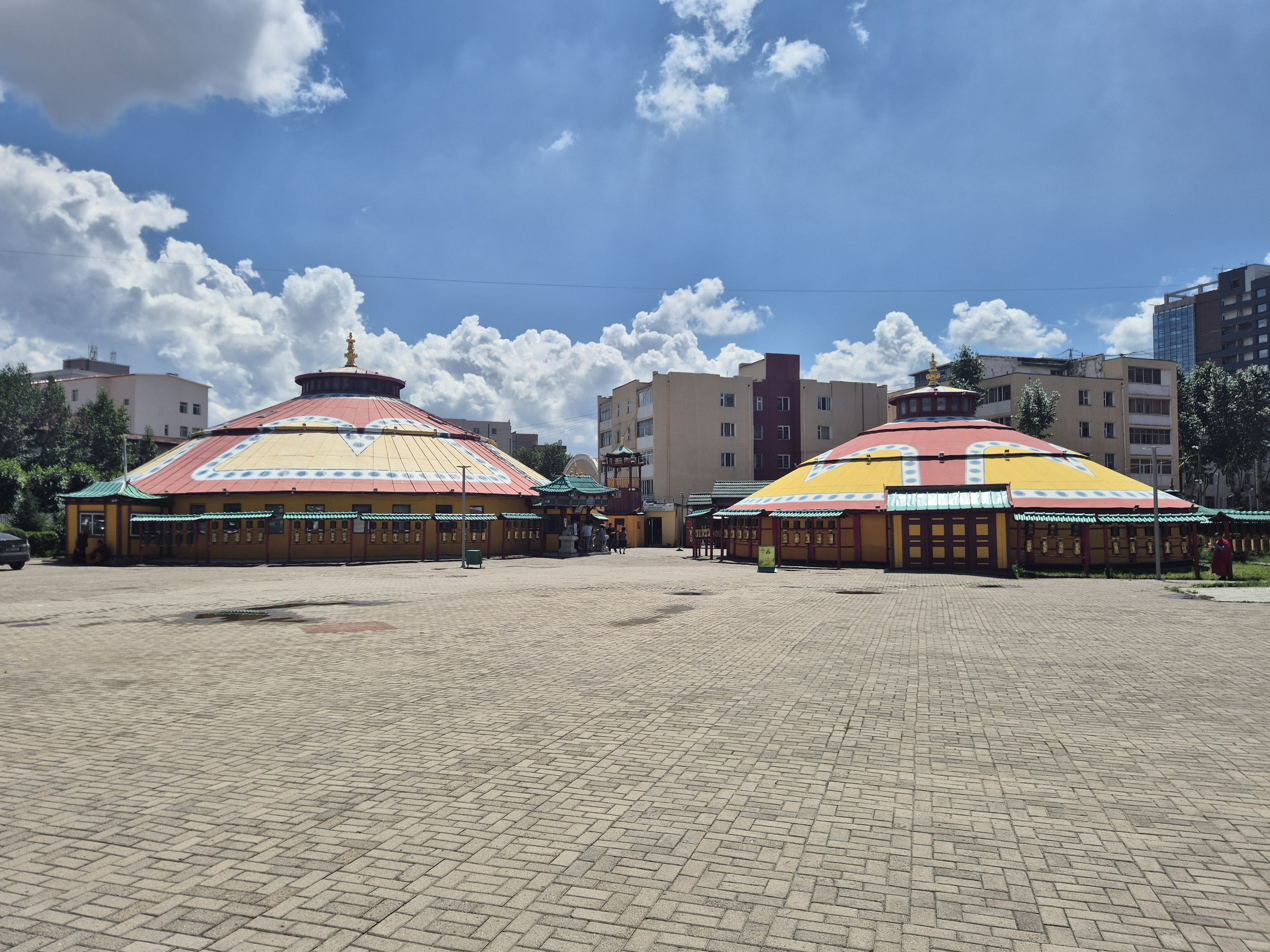
Yurt pavilions of Dashchoilin Monastery in Ulaanbaatar, example of aboriginal Mongolian architecture

Puntsoglin Monastery, an example of Sino-Tibetan-influenced Mongolian architecture

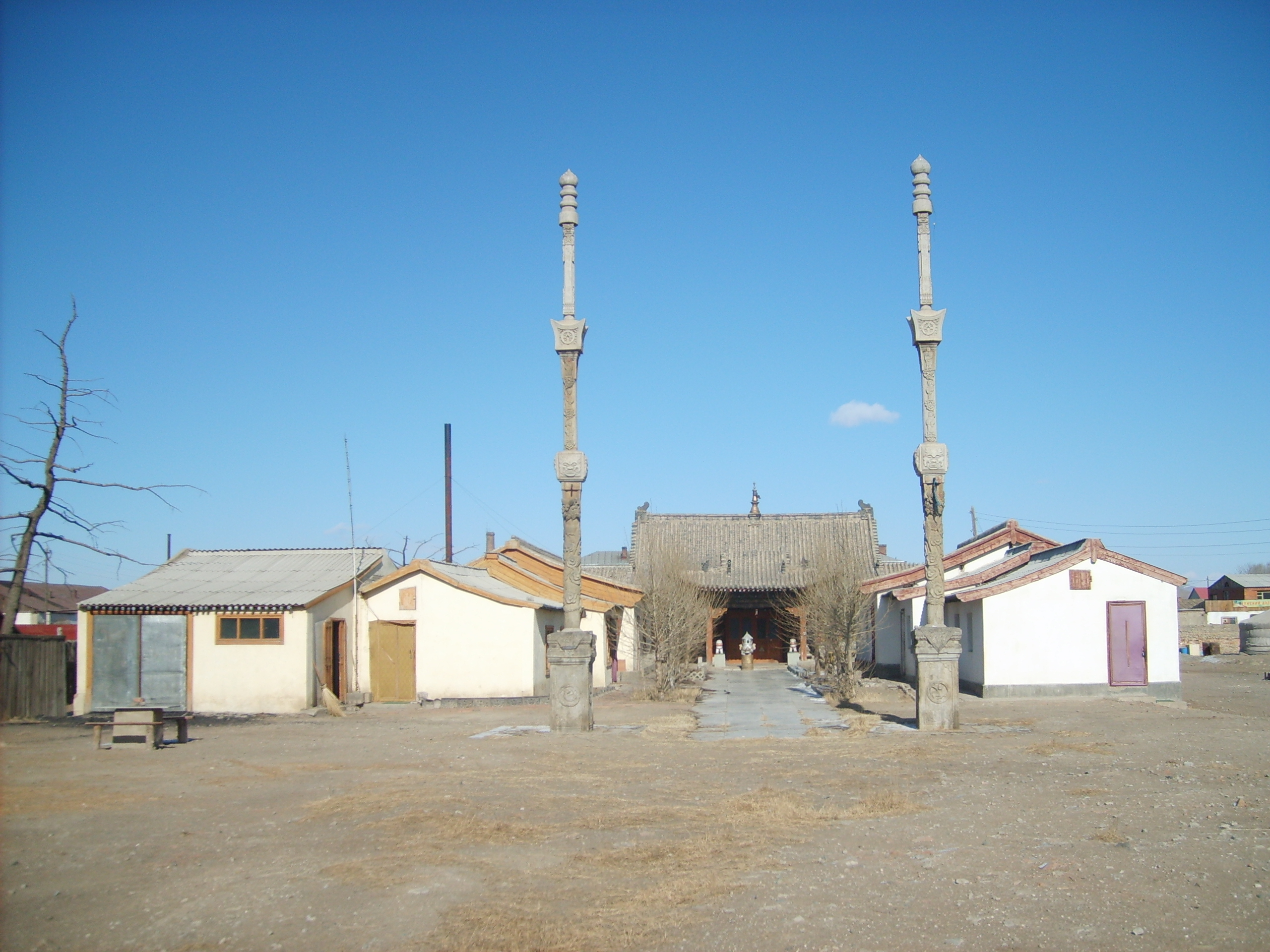
Dulmalin Nunnery, a nunnery (female monastery) in Ulaanbaatar, and another example of Sino-Tibetan architecture

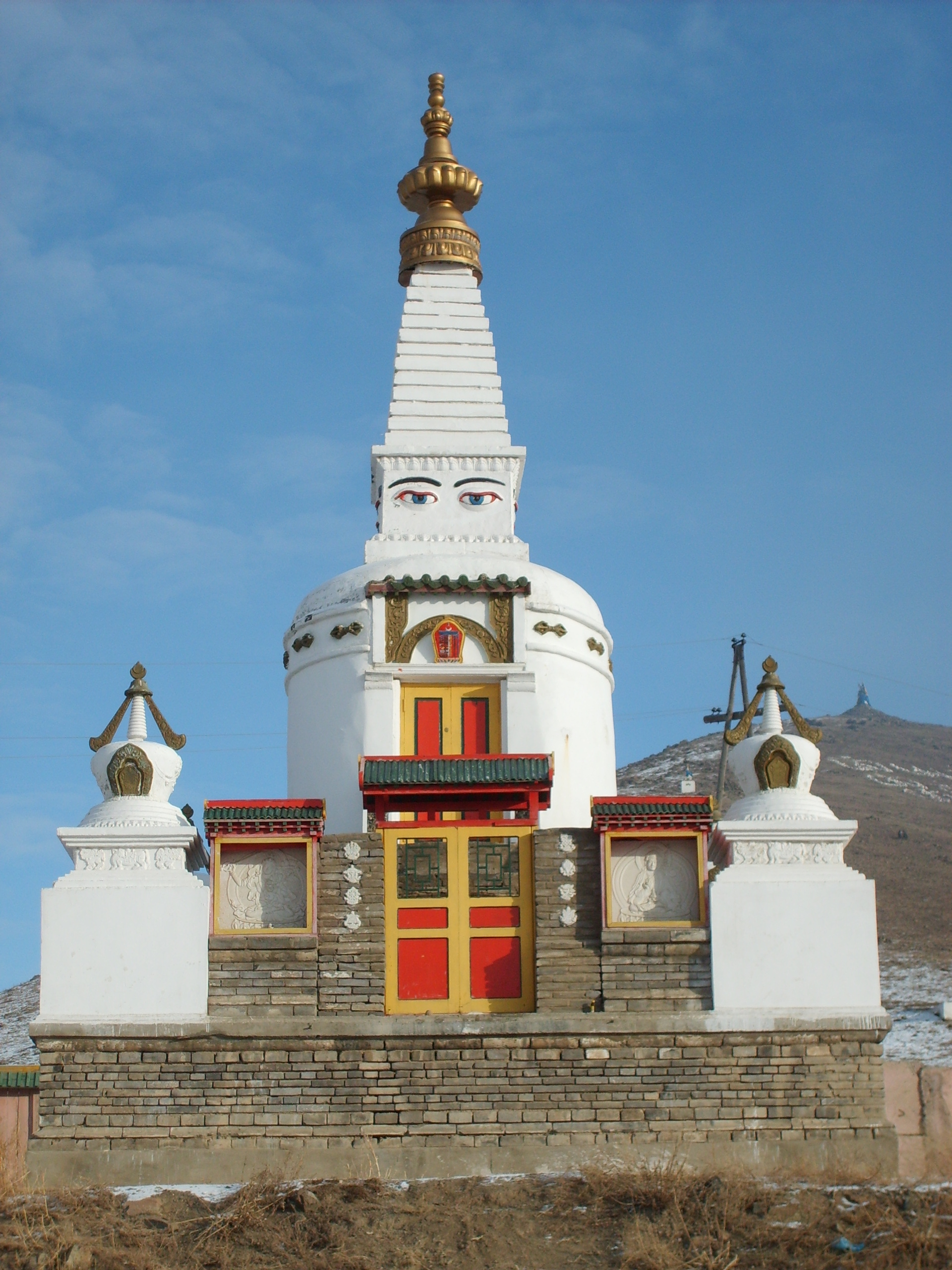
Stupa of Dambadarjaalin Monastery in Ulaanbaatar

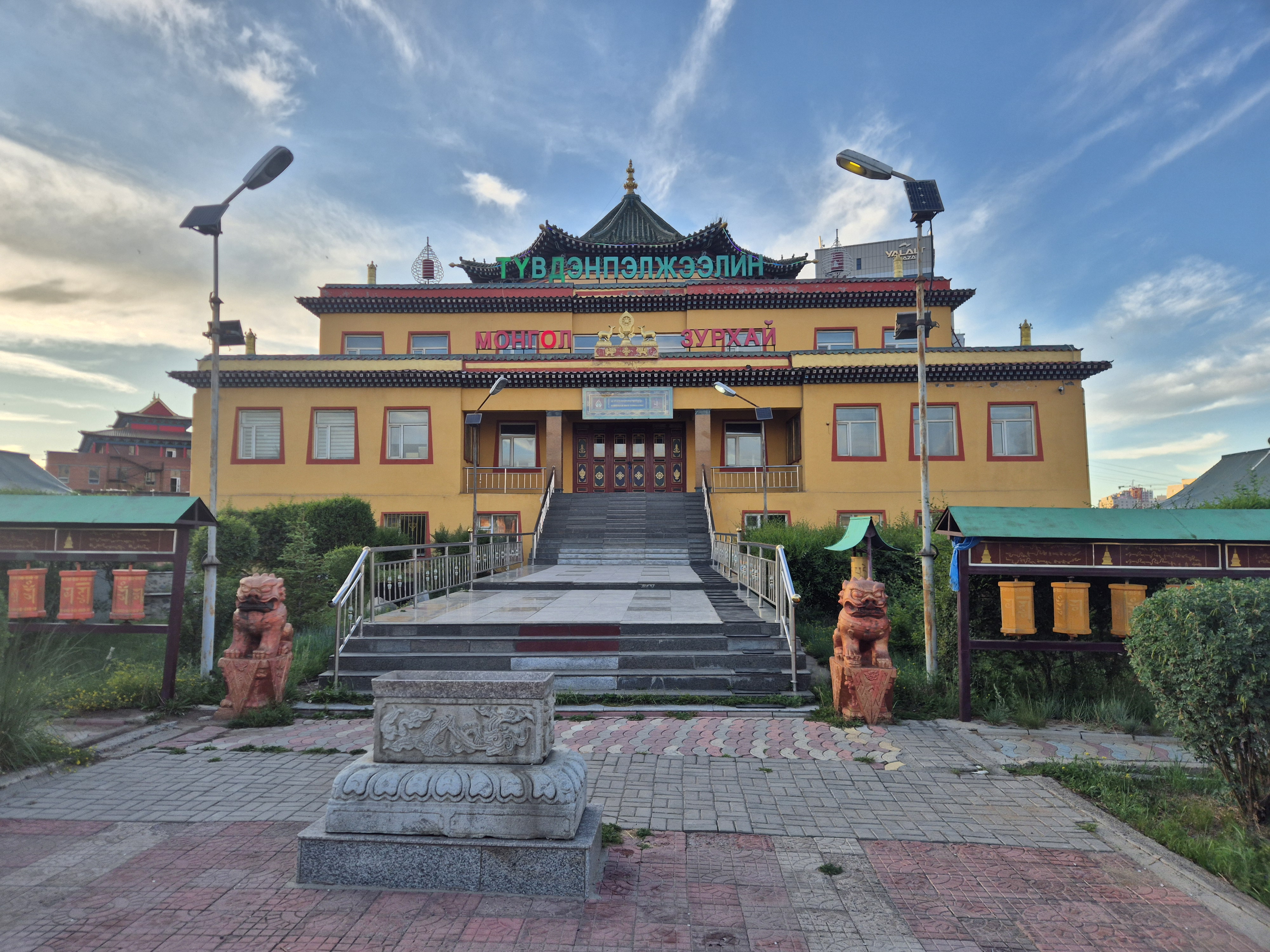
Tuvdenpeljeelin Monastery, a modern monastery of Mongolian Buddhist astrology in Ulaanbaatar

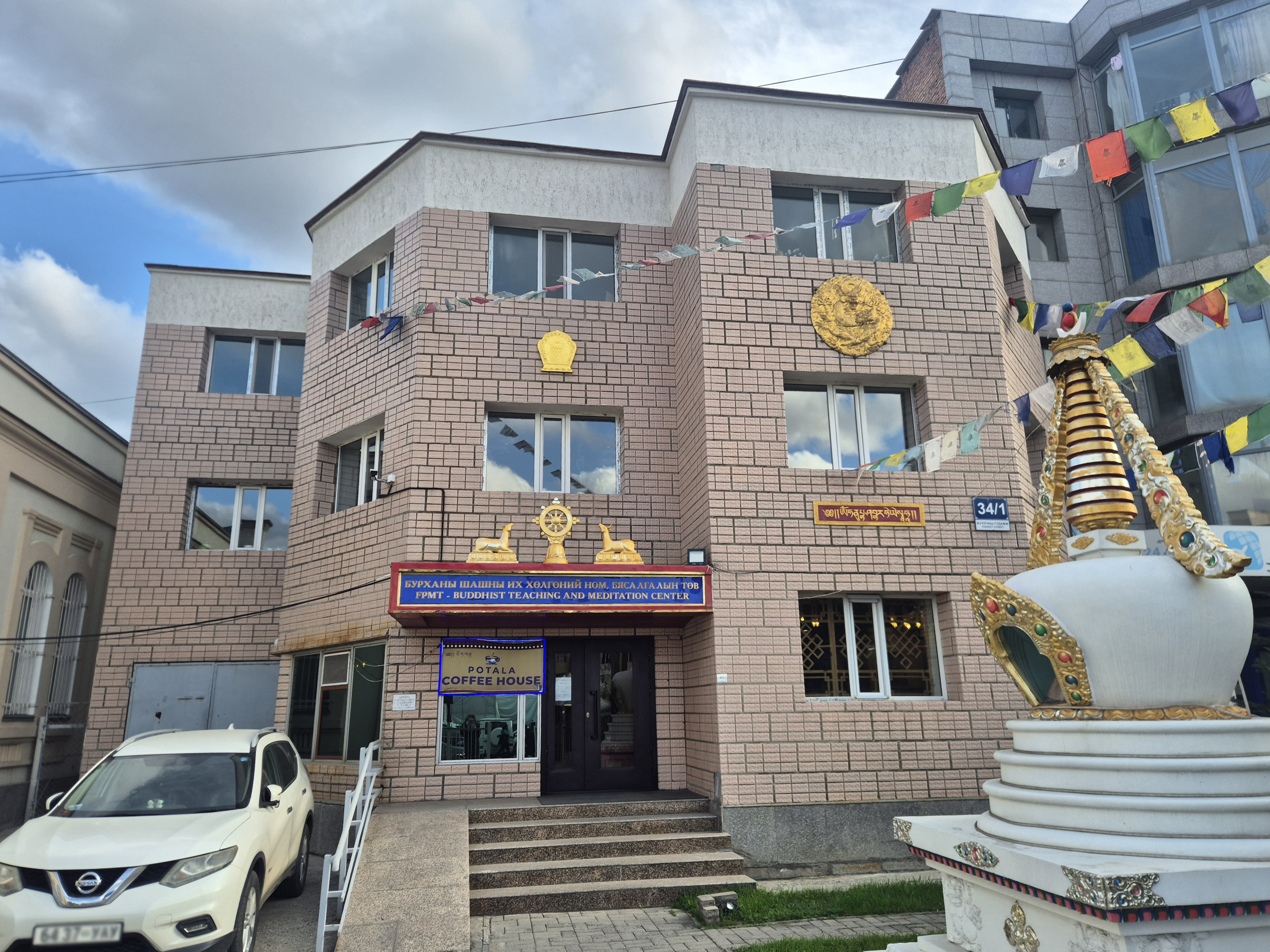
Shaduvlin Temple, a modern temple of the Foundation for the Preservation of the Mahayana Tradition

=== Mongolian shamanism ===
Mongolian shamanism, more broadly called the Mongolian folk religion, or occasionally Tengrism, refers to the animistic and shamanic ethnic religion that has been practiced by the Mongols at least since the age of recorded history. The Mongolian name of the practice is Böö mörgöl (Бөө мөргөл). In the earliest known stages it was tied to all other aspects of social life and to the tribal organization of Mongolian society. When the Mongols adopted Buddhism, Mongolian shamanism was influenced and merged with the new religion. During the communist republic of the twentieth century it was heavily repressed, but after the fall of communism it was revived. According to the 2020 census, 2.5% of the population of Mongolia, that is 82,422 people, declare that they are shamans.

Mongolian shamanism is centered on the worship of the tngri (gods) and the highest Tengri ("Heaven", "God of Heaven", or "God"), also called Qormusta Tengri. In the Mongolian folk religion, Genghis Khan is considered one of the embodiments, if not the main embodiment, of the supreme God. The Mausoleum of Genghis Khan in Ordos City, in Inner Mongolia, is an important center of this tradition.

Yellow shamanism is the term used to designate the particular version of Mongolian shamanism which adopts the expressive style of Buddhism. "Yellow" indicates Buddhism in Mongolian culture, since most Buddhists there belong to what is called the Gelug or "Yellow sect" of Tibetan Buddhism, whose members wear yellow hats while performing rituals. The term also serves to distinguish it from a form of shamanism not influenced by Buddhism, called black shamanism.

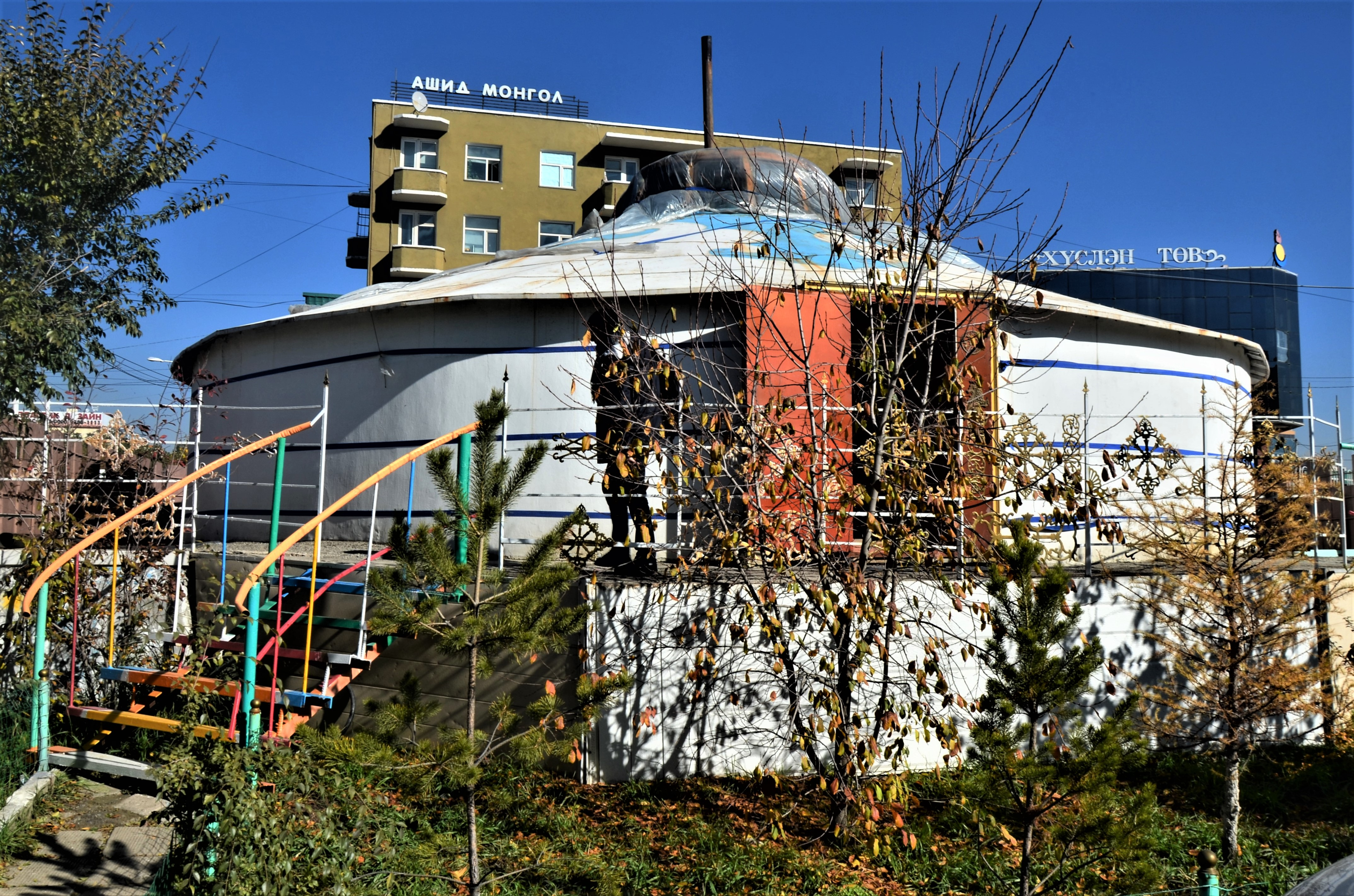
Yurt-shaped shamanic temple in Ulaanbaatar

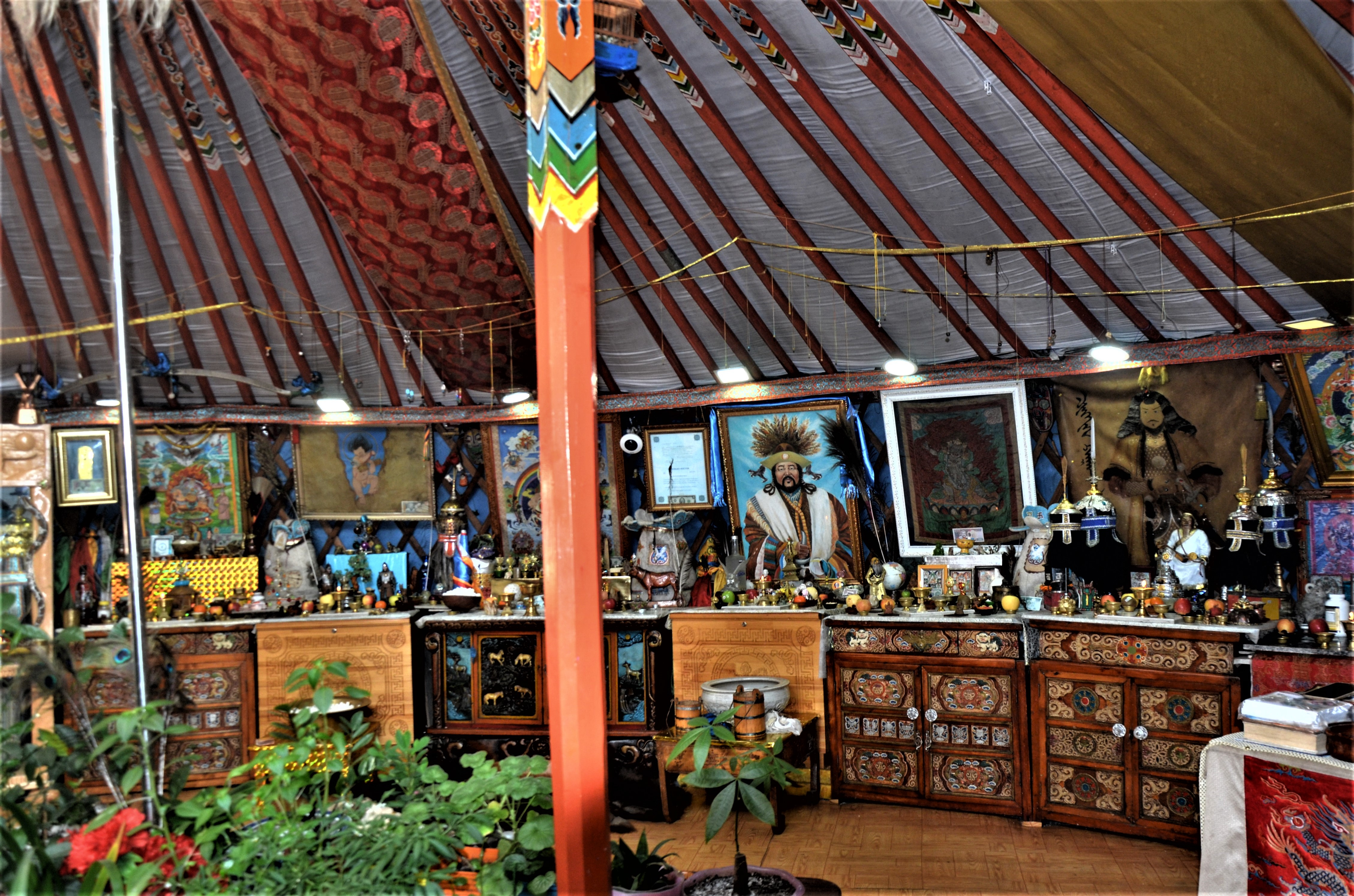
Interior of a shamanic temple in Ulaanbaatar

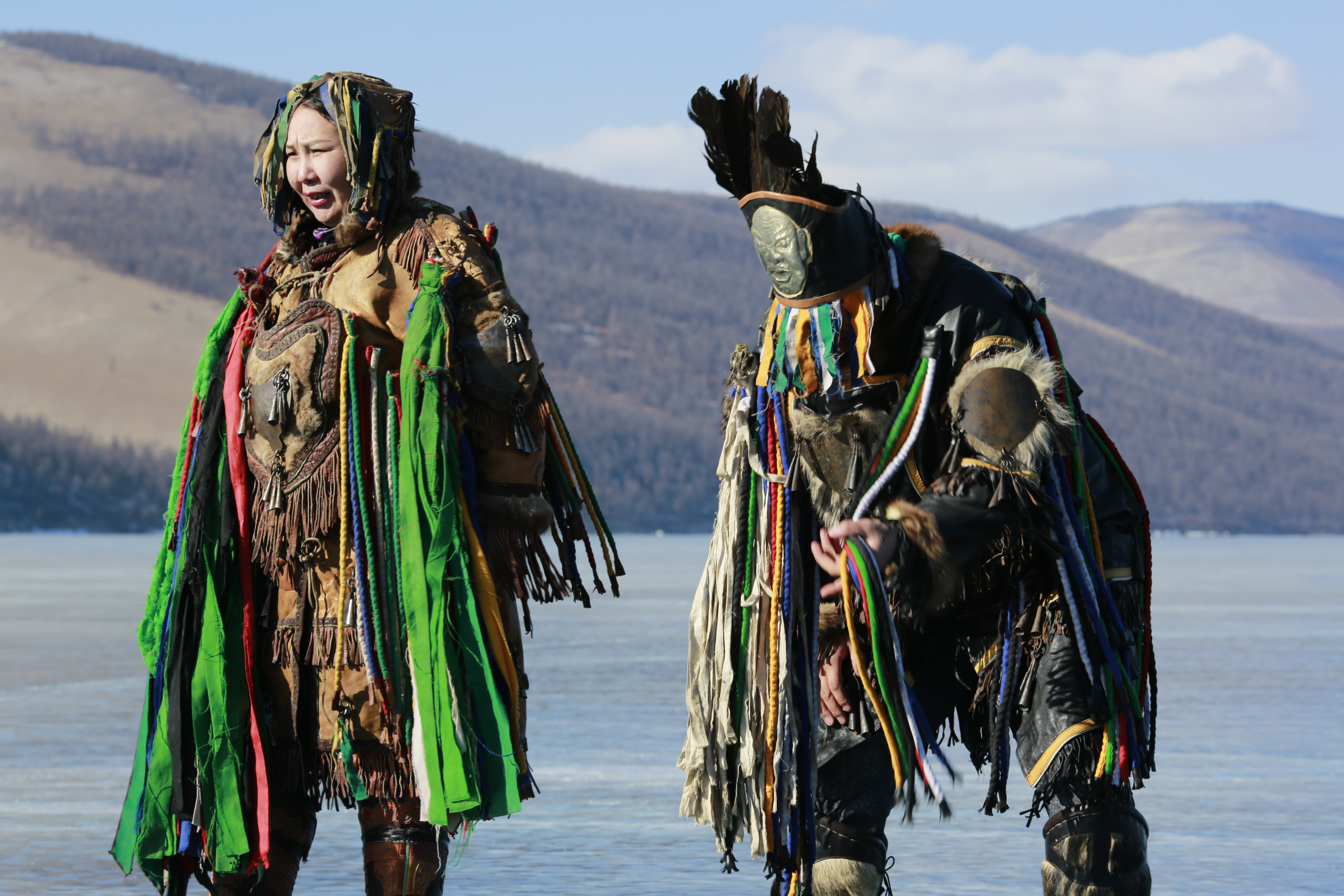
Shamans preparing themselves to perform a rite at the Blue Pearl Festival at Lake Khövsgöl, in Khövsgöl Province

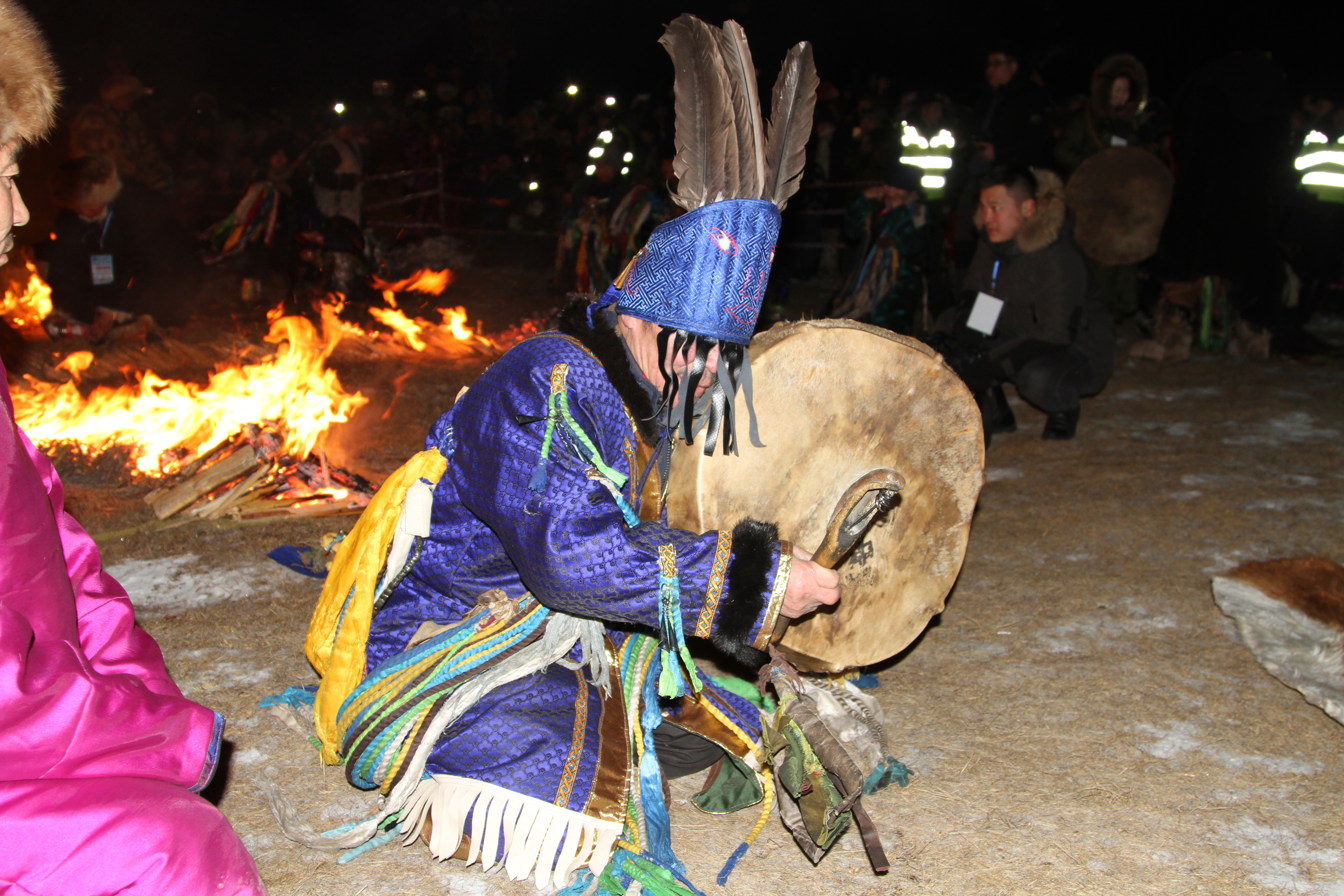
Shaman performing a fire ritual at Lake Khövsgöl

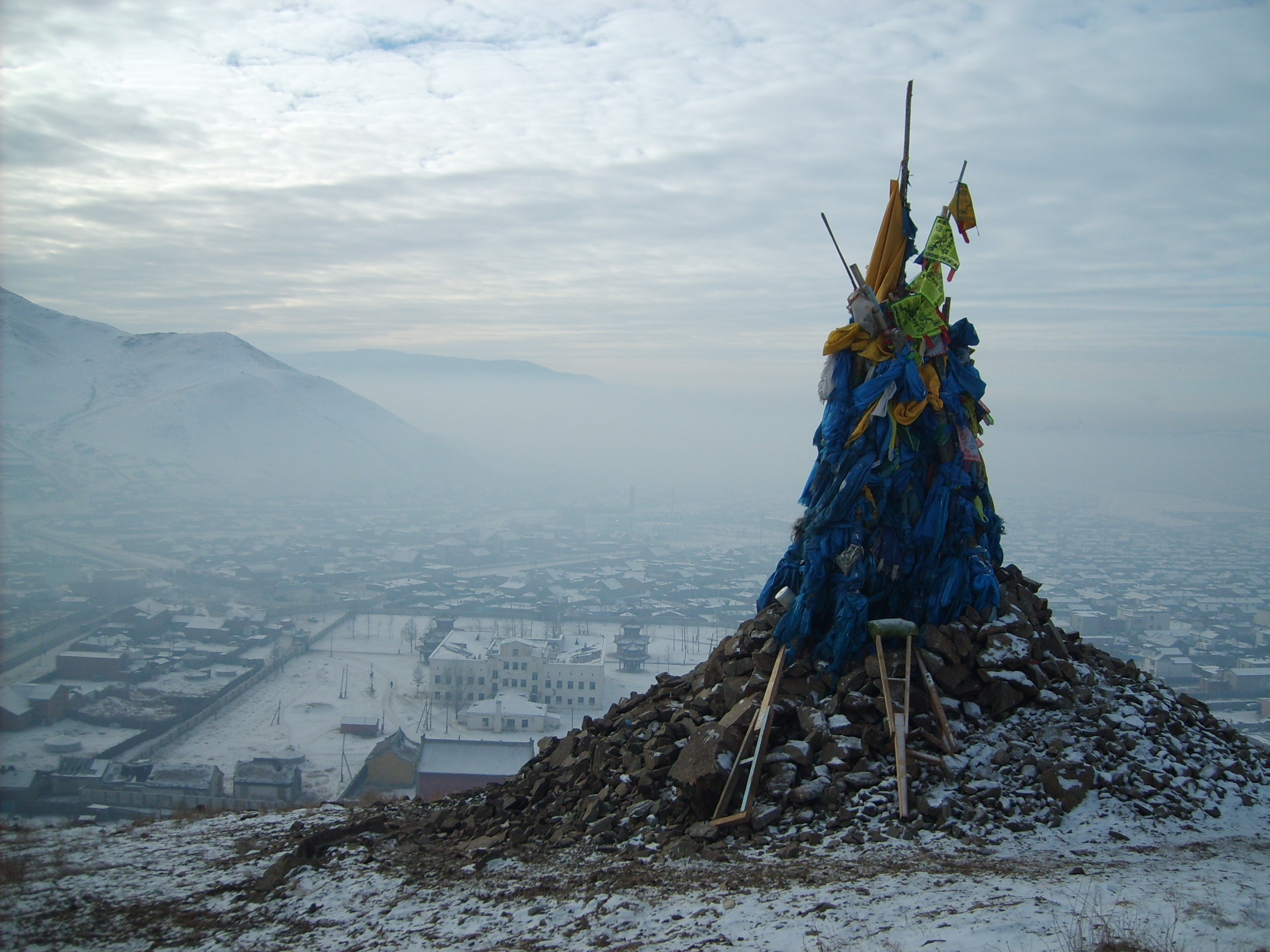
An ovoo on the sacred mount above Dambadarjaalin Monastery in Ulaanbaatar

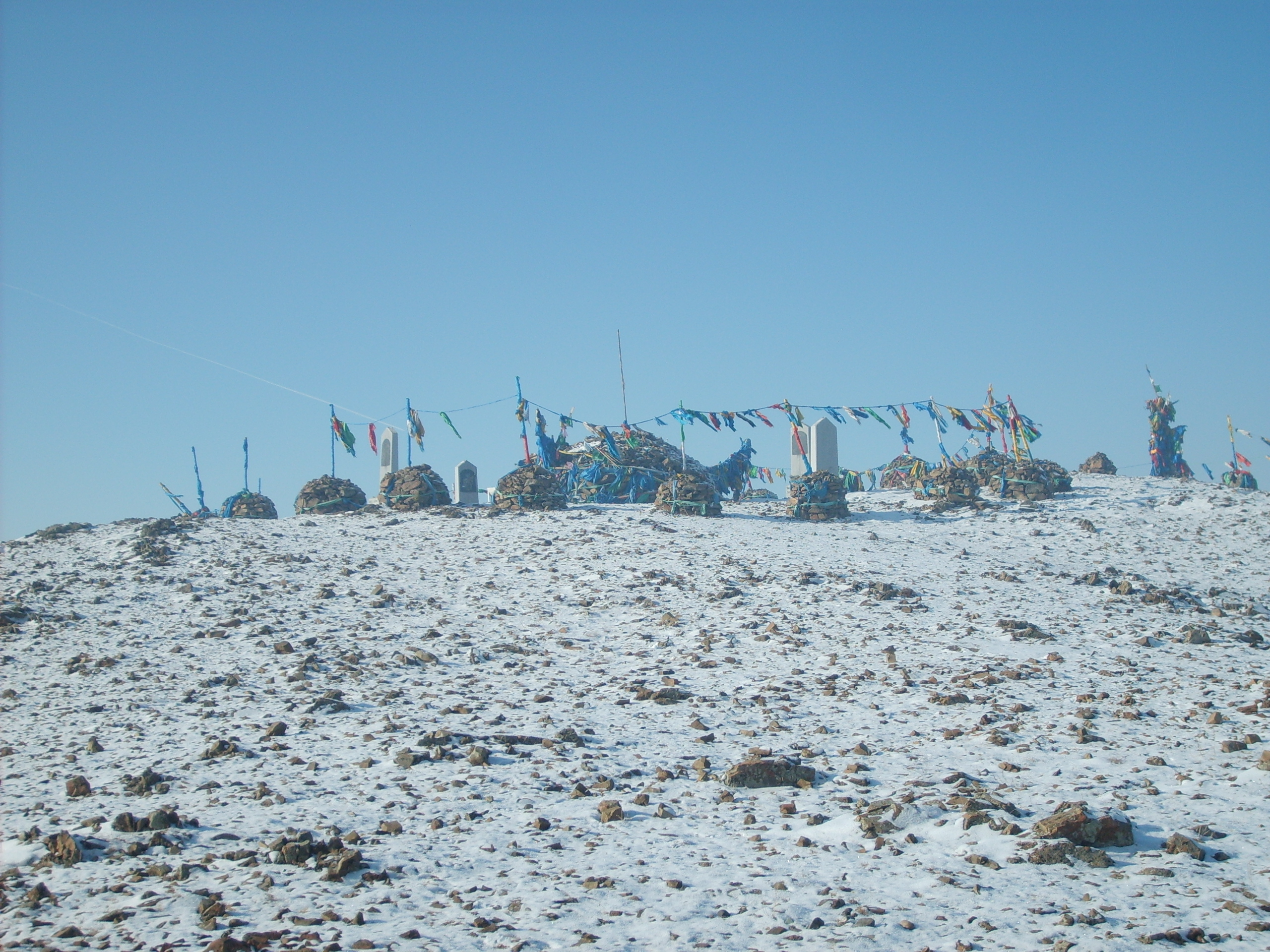
Shamanic temple on Chingeltei Uul, near Ulaanbaatar

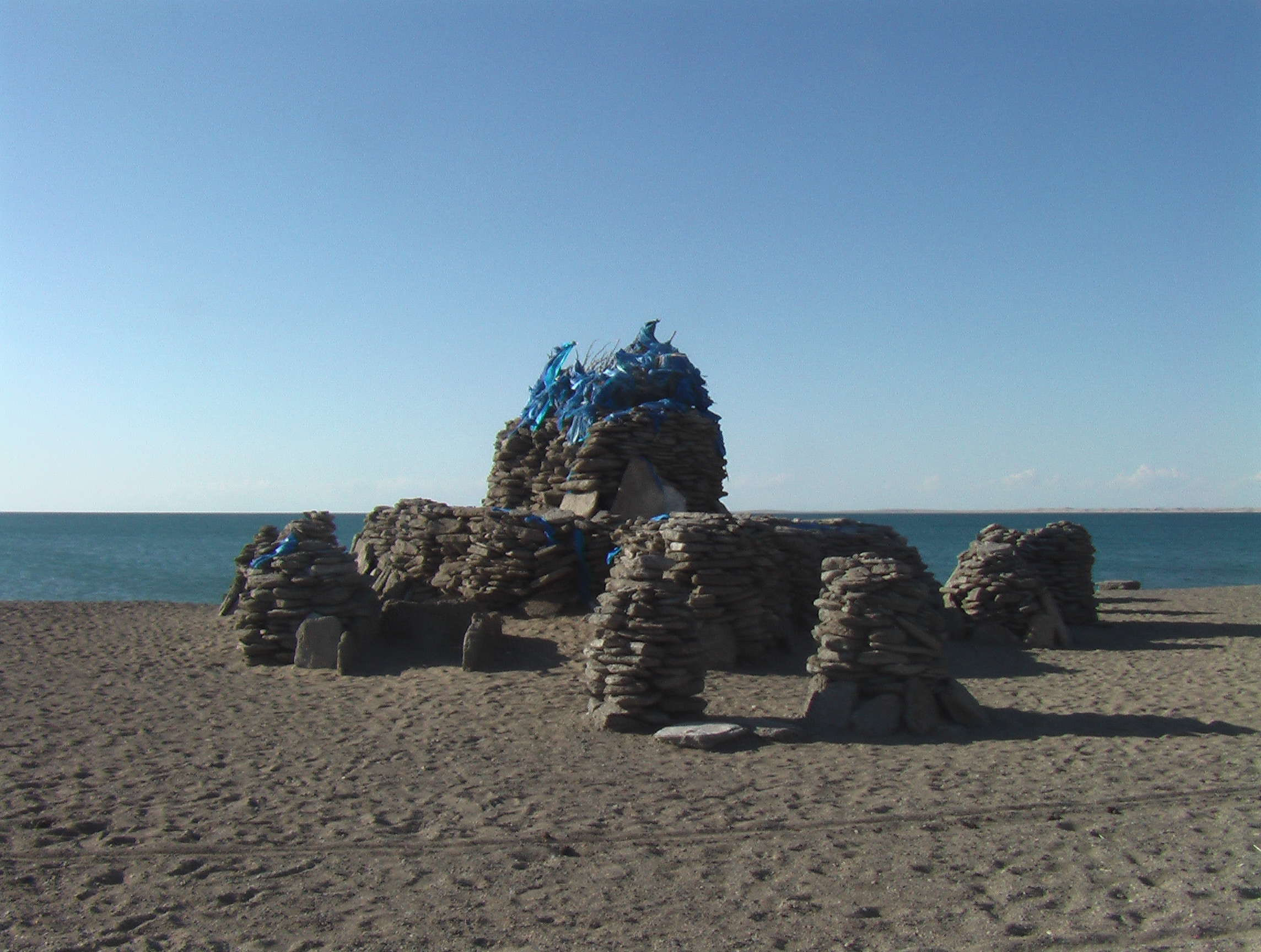
Janjin Ovoo at the southern shore of Dörgön Lake, in Govi-Altai Province

== Abrahamic religions ==
=== Islam ===
Islam in Mongolia is the religion of 105,500 people as of the 2020 census, corresponding to 3.2% of the population. It is mostly the religion of the Kazakh ethnic minority residing in the areas of Bayan-Ölgii Province and Khovd Province in western Mongolia. However, Kazakh communities may be found in cities and towns throughout all Mongolia.

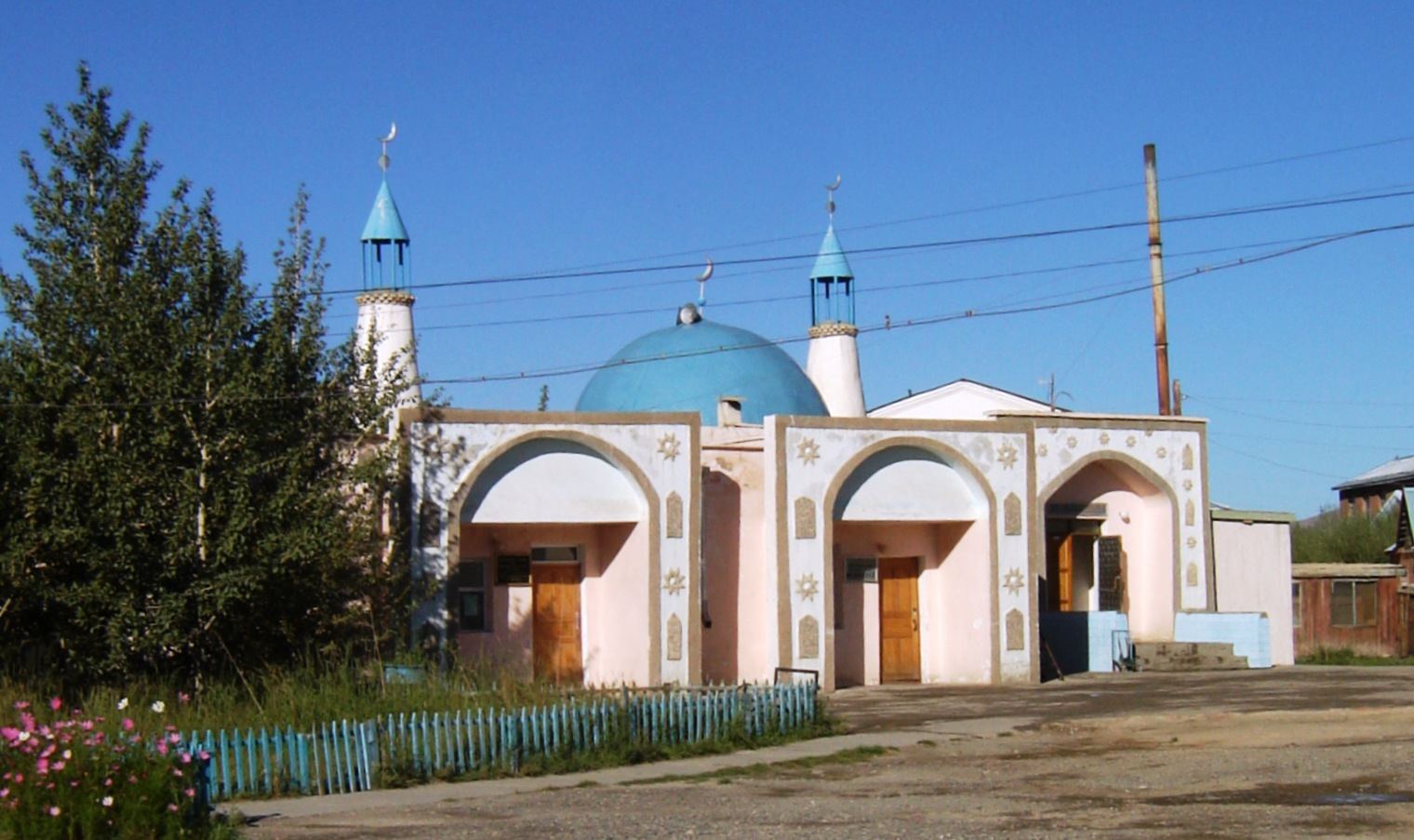
Mosque in Ölgii, Bayan-Ölgii

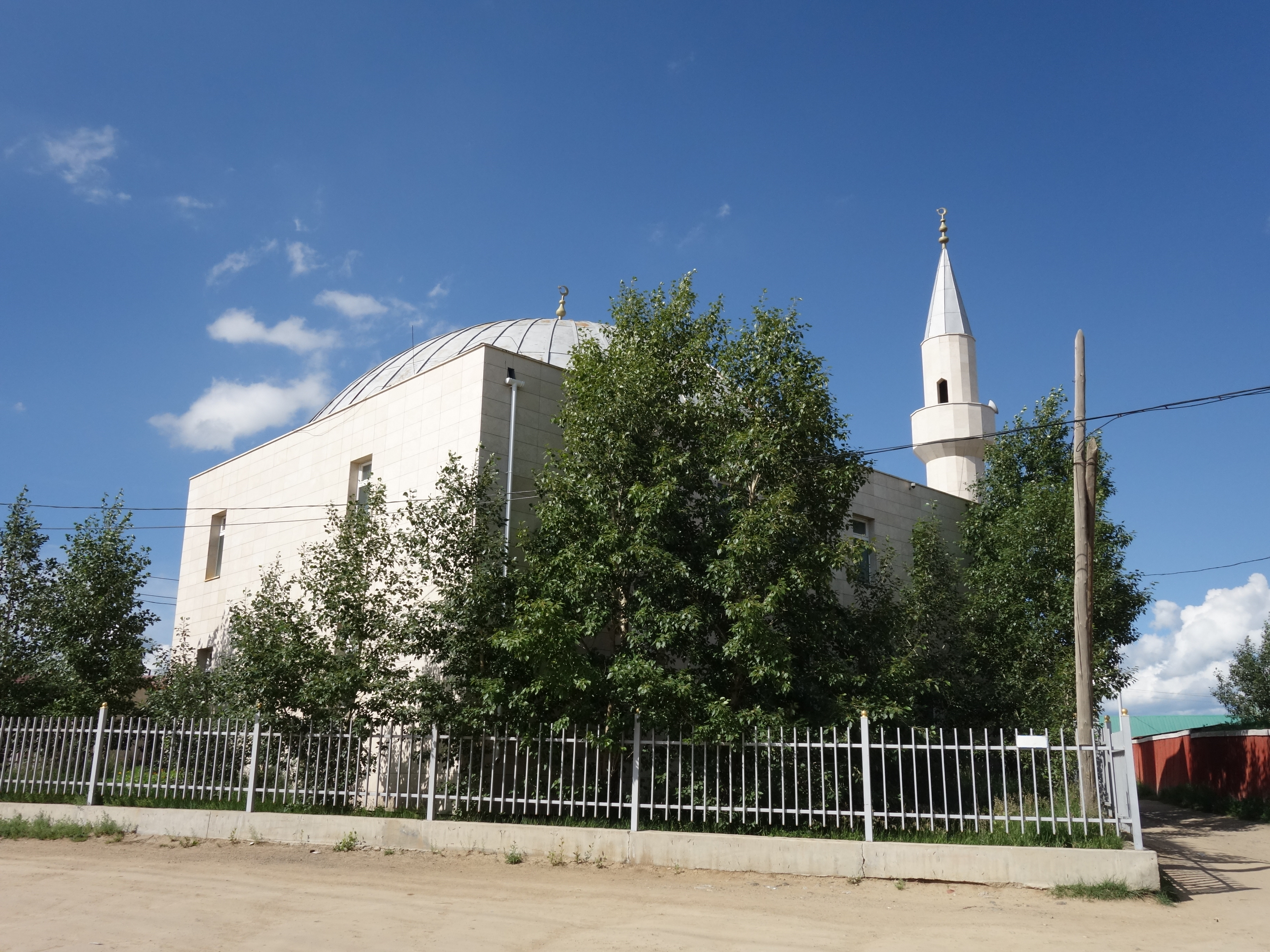
Mosque in Nalaikh, Ulaanbaatar

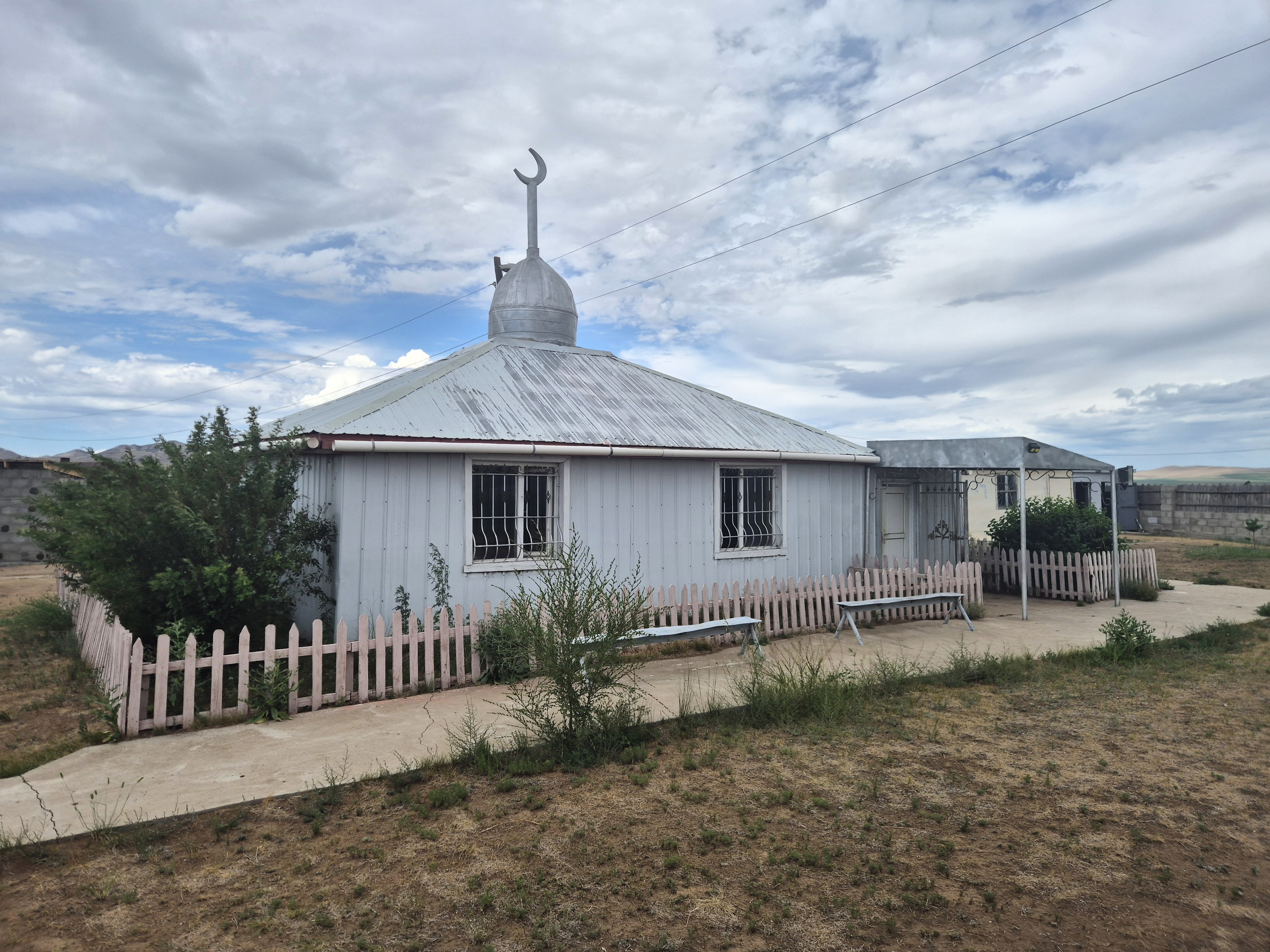
Mosque in Khongor, Darkhan-Uul

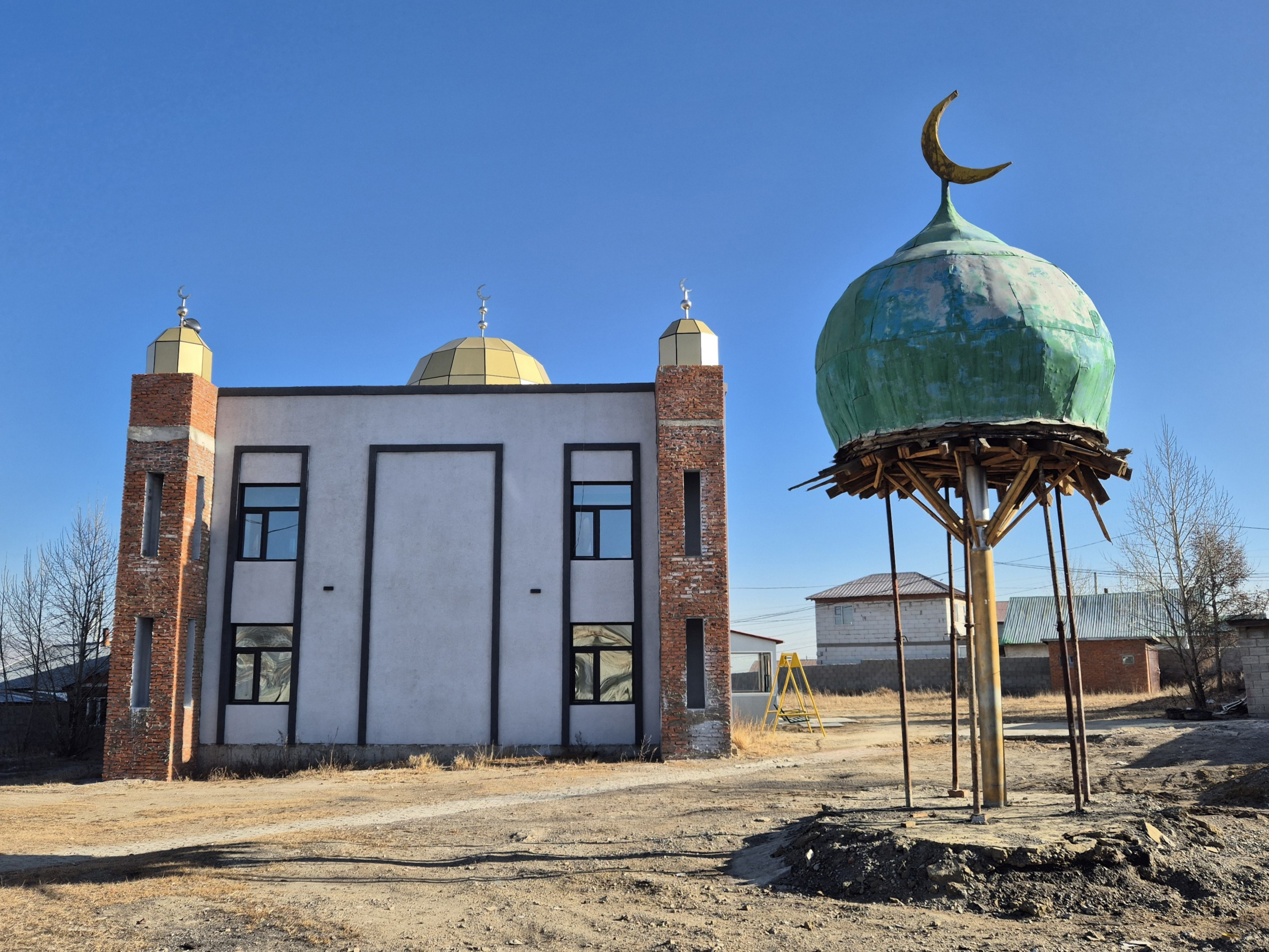
Mosque in Nalaikh, Ulaanbaatar

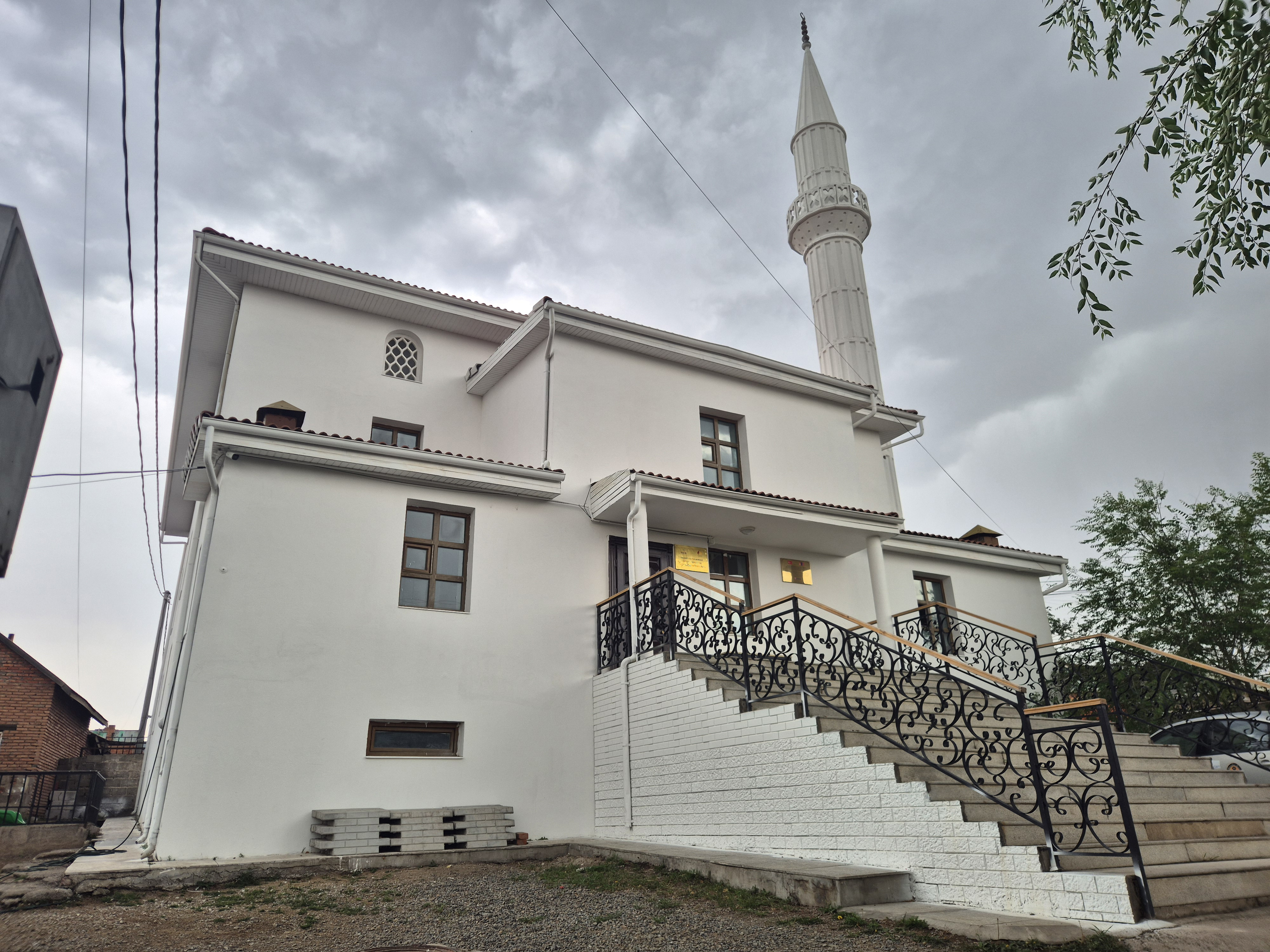
Mosque in Songino Khairkhan, Ulaanbaatar

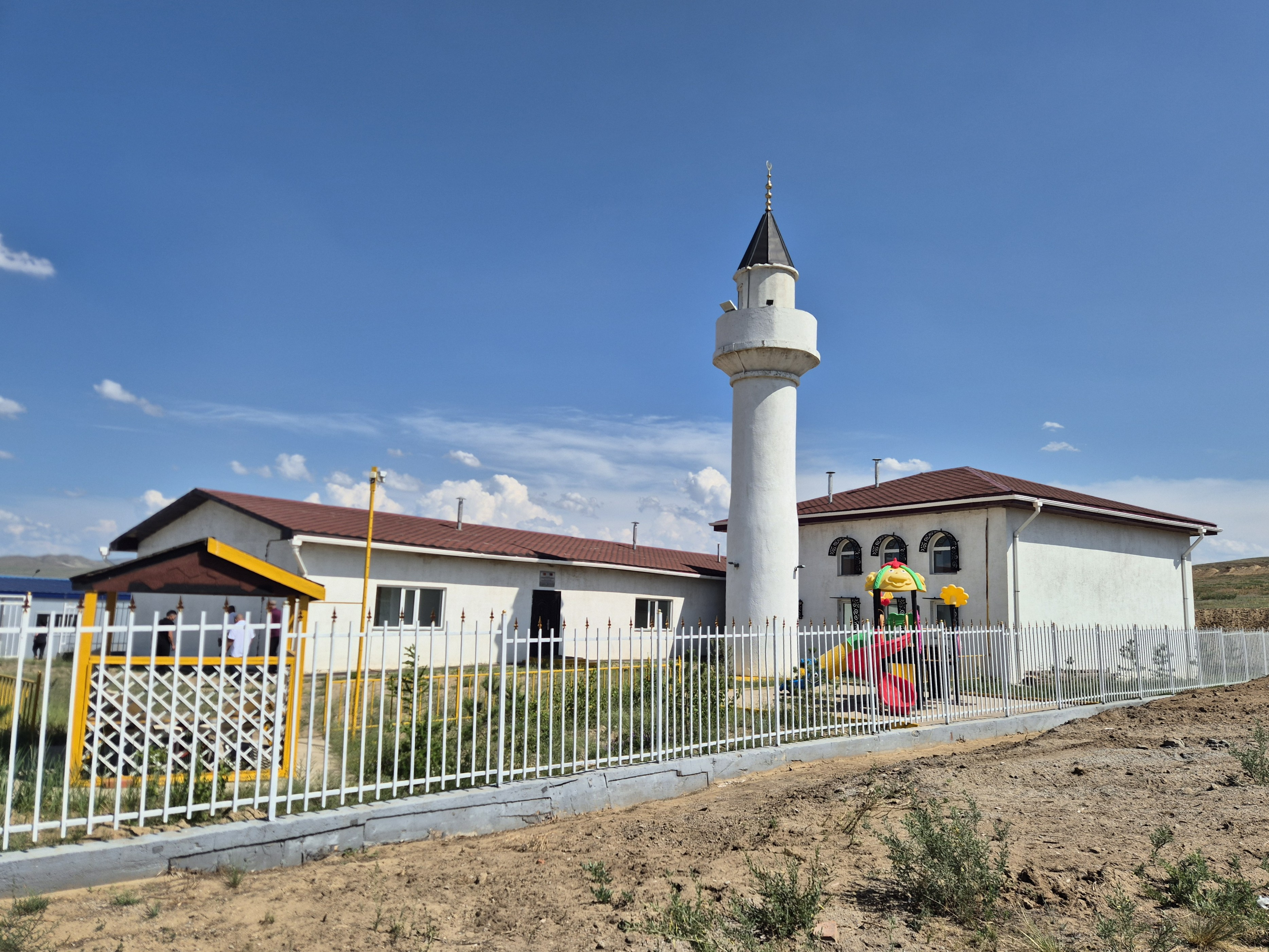
Mosque in Darkhan, Darkhan-Uul

=== Christianity ===
Christianity in Mongolia is the religion of 42,859 people according to the 2020 census, corresponding to 1.3% of the population. Christians in Mongolia include Protestants, Catholics, Orthodox Christians, and Mormons of the Church of Jesus Christ of Latter-day Saints.

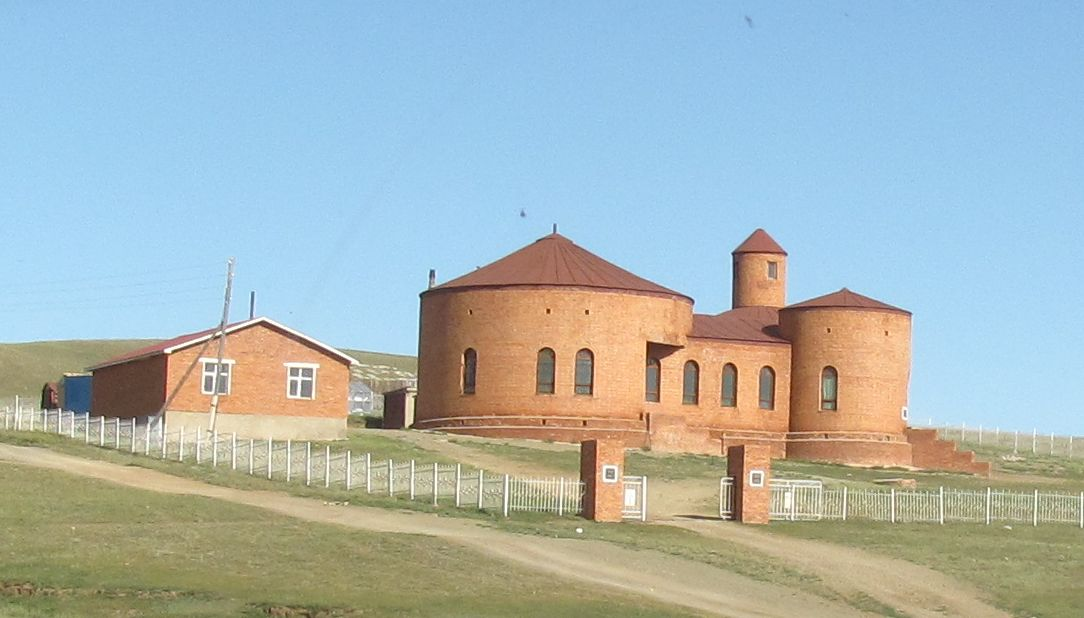
Protestant church in Zuunmod, Töv Province

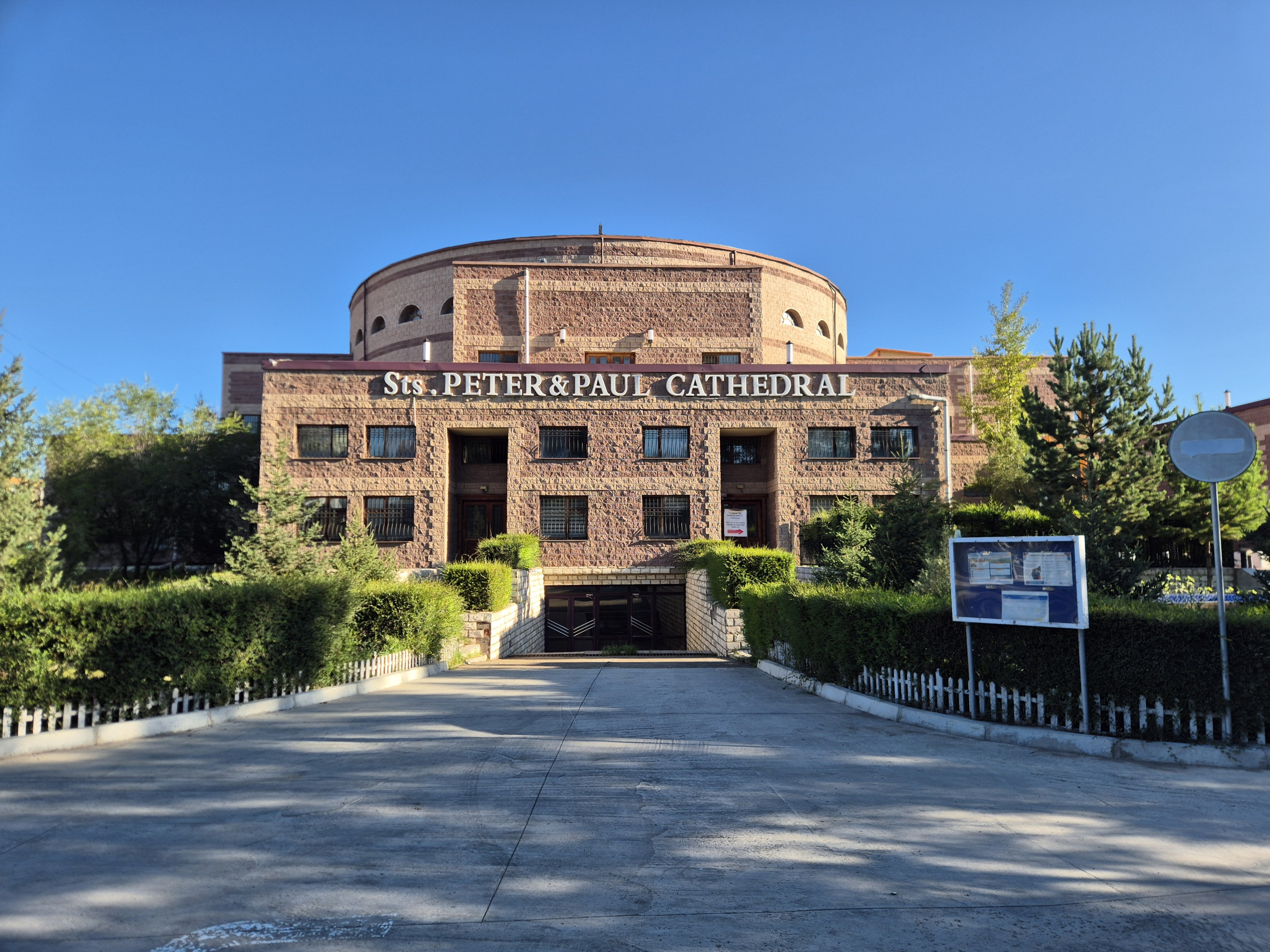
Saints Peter and Paul Cathedral in Ulaanbaatar, see of the Apostolic Prefecture of Ulaanbaatar of the Catholic Church

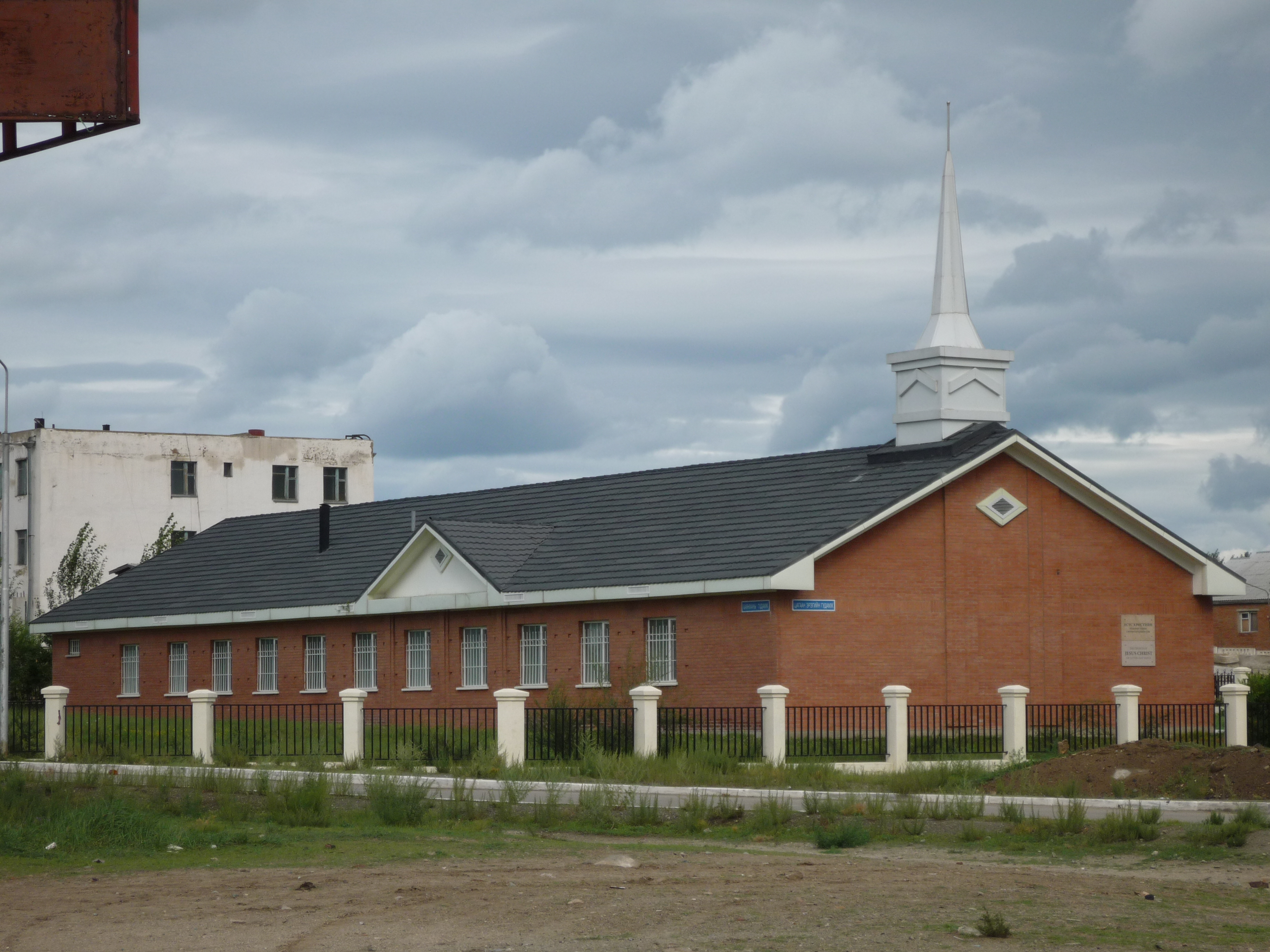
Mormon meetinghouse in Sükhbaatar, Selenge Province

=== Judaism ===
There are very few Jews in Mongolia, mostly descendants of refugees fleeing oppression in Russia, or Lithuanians forced to move by Soviet authorities.

== Other religions ==
The 2020 census counted 23,078 people who were adherents of religions other than Buddhism, Mongolian shamanism, Islam or Christianity, corresponding to 0.7% of the total population of the country.

The Baháʼí Faith was introduced in Mongolia only in the 1980s and 1990s, as prior to that point the communist ideology suppressed religions and impeded the spread of new ones. The first Bahá'í arrived in Mongolia in 1988, and founded a community of believers, later establishing a Bahá'í Local Spiritual Assembly. In 1994, the Bahá'ís elected their first National Spiritual Assembly.

Hinduism too has spread into Mongolia in the 1990s, after the collapse of the communist republic. The International Society for Krishna Consciousness (Hare Krishna) and Patanjali Yogpeeth have established themselves in Mongolia; at the same time some Mongolian Buddhists have incorporated Hindu concepts and techniques into their Buddhist religion.

== See also ==
- Religion in Inner Mongolia
- Religion in China

== Bibliography ==
- Abrahms-Kavunenko, Saskia (1 January 2012). "Religious 'Revival' After Socialism? Eclecticism and Globalisation Amongst Lay Buddhists in Ulaanbaatar". Inner Asia. 14 (2): 279–297. doi:10.1163/22105018-90000005. JSTOR 24572065.
- Abrahms-Kavunenko, Saskia (2019). "Mongolian Buddhism in the Democratic Period". Oxford Research Encyclopedia of Religion. Oxford University Press. doi:10.1093/acrefore/9780199340378.013.618. ISBN 9780199340378.
- Atwood, Christopher P. (1996). "Buddhism and Popular Ritual in Mongolian Religion: A Reexamination of the Fire Cult" (PDF). History of Religions. 36 (2). University of Chicago Press: 112–139. doi:10.1086/463455. S2CID 162394887. Archived from the original (PDF) on 15 November 2020.
- Balogh, Matyas (2010). "Contemporary shamanisms in Mongolia". Asian Ethnicity. 11 (2): 229–238. doi:10.1080/14631361003779489. S2CID 145595446.
- Bumochir, D. (2014). "Institutionalization of Mongolian shamanism: from primitivism to civilization". Asian Ethnicity. 15 (4): 473–491. doi:10.1080/14631369.2014.939331. S2CID 145329835.
- Charleux, Isabelle (2008). "Chinggis Khan: Ancestor, Buddha or Shaman?". Mongolian Studies. 30/31 (4). Mongolia Society: 207–258. JSTOR 43193542. Archived from the original on 26 February 2020.
- Dashkovskiy, Petr (2015). "Ethnic and Religious Processes in Western Mongolia (Based on Social Research)". Procedia - Social and Behavioral Sciences. 185: 109–116. doi:10.1016/j.sbspro.2015.03.422.
- Heissig, Walther (1980) [1970]. The Religions of Mongolia. Translated by Geoffrey Samuel. London; Henley: Routledge; Kegan Paul. ISBN 978-0520038578.
- Hesse, Klaus (1986). "A Note on the Transformation of White, Black and Yellow Shamanism in the History of the Mongols". Studies in History. 2 (1): 17–30. doi:10.1177/025764308600200102. S2CID 162239153.
- Kollmar-Paulenz, Karénina (2017). "Of Yellow Teaching and Black Faith: Entangled Knowledge Cultures and the Creation of Religious Traditions" (PDF). In Bochinger, Christoph; Rüpke, Jörg (eds.). Dynamics of Religion. Past and Present. De Gruyter. pp. 231–250. doi:10.1515/9783110450934-013. ISBN 9783110450927. Archived from the original (PDF) on 18 February 2020.
- Man, John (2004). Genghis Khan: Life, Death and Resurrection. London, England: Bantam Press. ISBN 9780553814989.
- Schlehe, Judith (2004). "Shamanism in Mongolia and in New Age Movements". In Rasuly-Paleczek, Gabriele (ed.). Central Asia on Display: Proceedings of the VIIth Conference of the European Society for Central Asian Studies. Vol. 1. Vienna: Lit Verlag. pp. 283–296. ISBN 3825883094.
- Rinchen, Yönsiyebü (1981). "White, Black and Yellow Shamans Among the Mongols". Ultimate Reality and Meaning. 4 (2): 94–102. doi:10.3138/uram.4.2.94.
- Shimamura, Ippei (2004). "Yellow Shamans (Mongolia)". In Walter, Mariko Namba; Neumann Fridman, Eva Jane (eds.). Shamanism: An Encyclopedia of World Beliefs, Practices, and Culture. Vol. 1. ABC-CLIO. pp. 649–651. ISBN 9781576076453.
- Turner, Kevin B. (2016). Sky Shamans of Mongolia: Meetings with Remarkable Healers. Berkeley, California: North Atlantic Books. ISBN 9781583946343.
- Wallace, Vesna A., ed. (2015). Buddhism in Mongolian History, Culture, and Society. New York: Oxford University Press. ISBN 978-0199958665.
