= Wenceslao Padilla =

Filipino Catholic bishop (1949–2018)

Most Reverend Wenceslao Padilla C.I.C.M.
- Apostolic Prefect of Ulaanbaatar
- Church: Catholic Church
- Diocese: Apostolic Prefecture of Ulaanbaatar
- See: Ulaanbaatar
- Appointed: 2 August 2003
- In office: 2003–2018
- Predecessor: Everard Ter Laak
- Successor: Giorgio Marengo

Orders
- Ordination: 17 March 1976 by Victorino Cristobal Ligot
- Consecration: 29 August 2003 by Crescenzio Sepe

Personal details
- Born: Wenceslao Selga Padilla; 29 September 1949 Tubao, Philippines
- Died: 25 September 2018 (aged 68) Ulaanbaatar, Mongolia
- Denomination: Roman Catholic Church
- Residence: Ulaanbaatar, Mongolia
- Motto: Light that illuminate people
- Coat of arms: Wenceslao Padilla's coat of arms

Styles of Wenceslao Selga Padilla
- Reference style: The Most Reverend
- Spoken style: Your Excellency
- Religious style: Monsignor
- Posthumous style: none

Wenceslao Selga Padilla (29 September 1949 – 25 September 2018) was a Filipino Scheut priest who from 2 August 2003 was the Apostolic prefect of the Apostolic Prefecture of Ulaanbaatar, a pre-diocesan missionary jurisdiction of the Roman Catholic Church in Mongolia.

== Biography ==
Born on 29 September 1949 in Tubao, La Union, Philippines, Wenceslao Padilla came from a Catholic family; his father was a catechist. In 1960 he entered the seminary and in 1976 was ordained a priest for Scheut Missionaries. He was a missionary in Taiwan and, for six years, a provincial superior of the Chinese provinces of his Order.

Mongolia and the Holy See established diplomatic relations in 1991. Padilla left the Philippines in 1992 to work as a missionary in Mongolia. On 19 April 1992 he was appointed ecclesiastical superior of the mission sui iuris of Urga (the old name of Ulanbataar). He began taking care of street children, the homeless, disabled and old.

When on 8 July 2002, Pope John Paul II established the Apostolic Prefecture of Ulaanbaatar, Father Padilla became its first prefect. On 2 August 2003 he was appointed as a bishop and received the titular see of Tharros. His episcopal consecration on 29 August 2003 was presided over by Cardinal Crescenzio Sepe, in the Ulanbataar cathedral.

The first Mongolian priest, Joseph Enkhee-Baatar, was ordained by Padilla on 26 August 2016.

He continued in his ministry giving help to homeless and orphans until 2016.

== Death ==
Padilla died on 25 September 2018 in Ulaanbaatar due to a heart attack.

Catholic Church titles
Preceded by title created	Apostolic Prefect of Ulaanbaatar; 8 July 2002–25 September 2018	Succeeded by Giorgio Marengo I.M.C.
Preceded by Antal Spányi	Titular bishop of Tharros; 2 August 2003–25 September 2018	
