= Holy Trinity Church, Ulaanbaatar =

Church in Bayanzürkh, Ulaanbaatar, Mongolia

Holy Trinity Church
- Свято-Троицкая церковь
- Гэгээн Троицкийн сүм
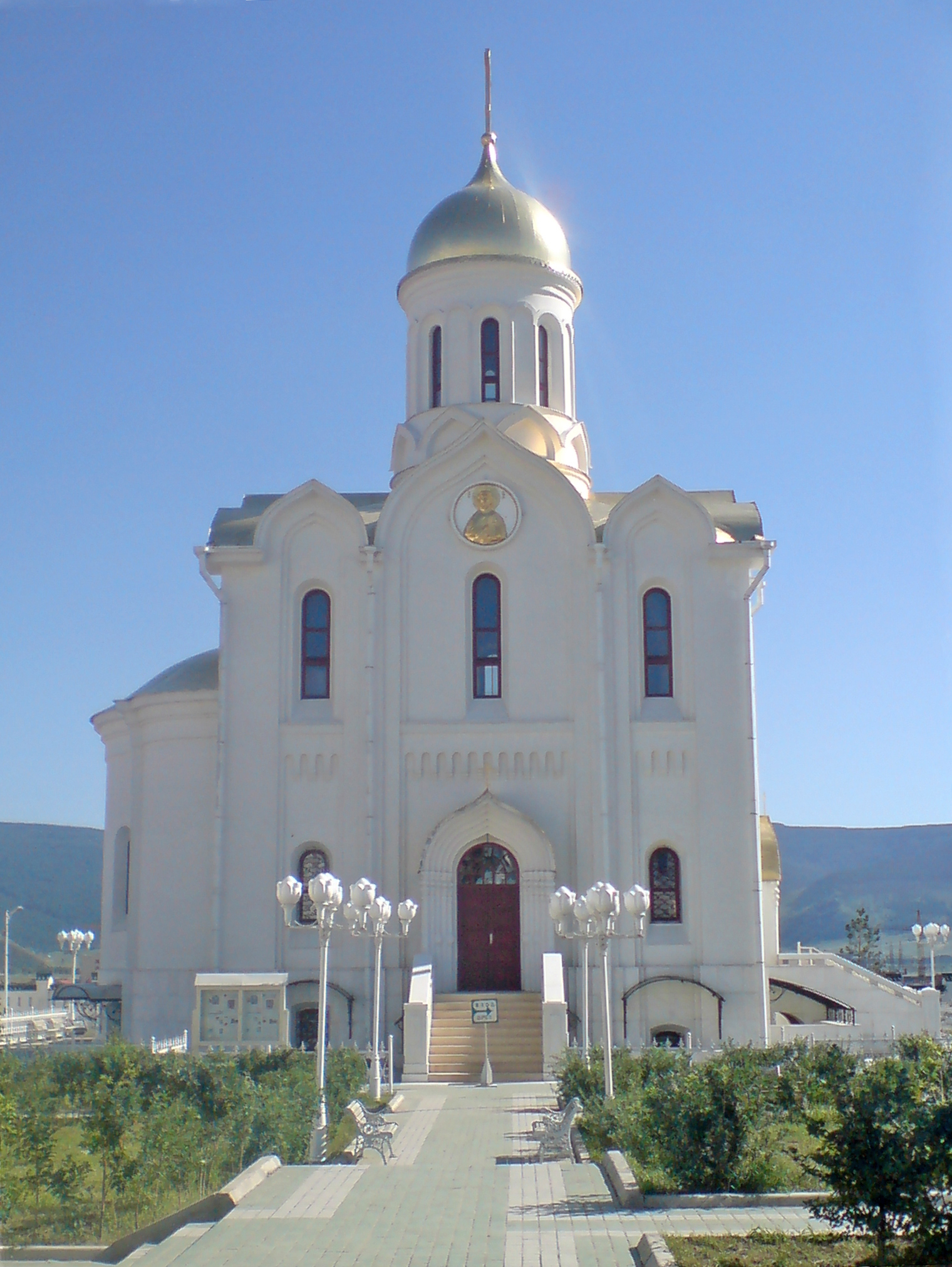
- Holy Trinity Church
- 47°54′57″N 106°57′32″E
- Location: Bayanzürkh, Ulaanbaatar
- Country: Mongolia
- Denomination: Russian Orthodox Church
- Website: www.pravoslavie.mn

Architecture
- Architectural type: Cross-in-square
- Style: Russian Revival
- Years built: 2005-2009

Administration
- Parish: Holy Trinity parish

The Holy Trinity Church (Mongolian: Гэгээн Троицкийн сүм) also called Trinity Church is a Russian Orthodox church in Bayanzürkh, Ulaanbaatar, Mongolia.

In 1860, as a result of the signing of the Convention of Peking, the Russian Empire was granted the right to open a consulate in Urga, the capital of Outer Mongolia. In 1863 the consulate staff with a convoy of twenty Cossacks came to Urga and opened its own building for the consulate that bound directly to the Orthodox Church in honour of the Holy Trinity. On 22 March 1864 it was sent the first priest who offered a religious service. This date is considered the beginning of the Holy Trinity parish of Russian Orthodox Church in Mongolia.

Since 1927, the church had no priest and was closed for religious use since it was used for other purposes. It was demolished in the 1930s. After the Mongolian Revolution of 1990, the local Orthodox church reemerged. In the summer of 2001 the foundation stone of a new temple in honour of the Holy Trinity was laid. Its construction began in 2005 and ended in 2009.

== See also ==
- Christianity in Mongolia
