= Apostolic Prefecture of Ulaanbaatar =

Roman Catholic missionary jurisdiction in Mongolia

Apostolic Prefecture of Ulaanbaatar Praefectura Apostolica Ulaanbaatarensis Улаанбаатар хот дахь Элч нарын эрх мэдэлд суурилсан шашны засаг захиргаа ᠤᠯᠠᠭᠠᠨᠪᠠᠭᠠᠲᠤᠷ ᠬᠣᠲᠠ ᠳ᠋ᠠᠬᠢ ᠡᠯᠴᠢ ᠨᠠᠷ ᠤᠨ ᠡᠷᠬᠡ ᠮᠡᠳᠡᠯ ᠳᠦ ᠰᠠᠭᠤᠷᠢᠯᠠᠭᠰᠠᠨ ᠱᠠᠰᠢᠨ ᠤ ᠵᠠᠰᠠᠭ ᠵᠠᠬᠢᠷᠭ᠎ᠠ
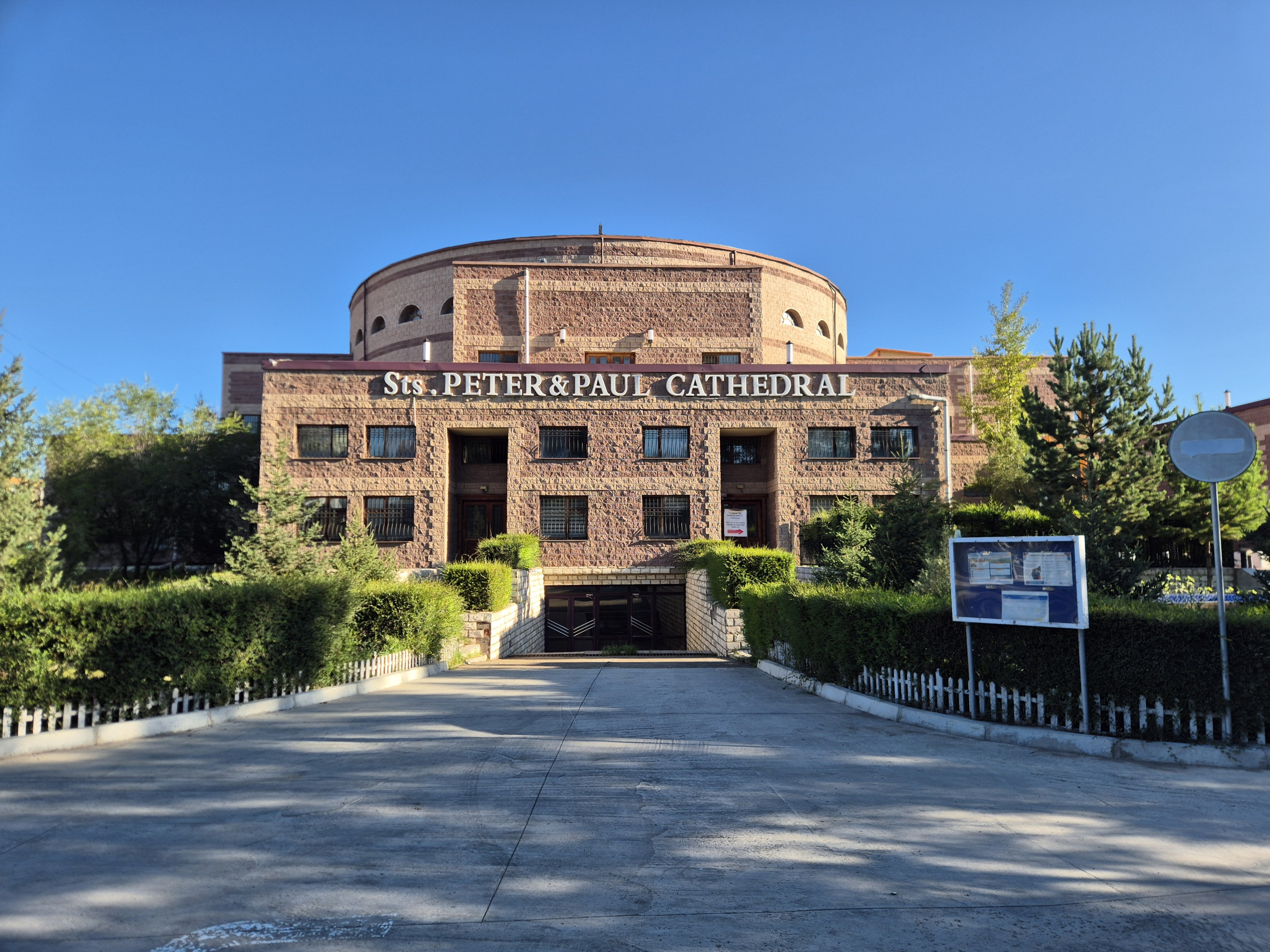
- Cathedral of St Peter and St Paul, Ulaanbaatar

Location
- Country: Mongolia
- Metropolitan: Immediately subject to the Holy See

Statistics
- Area: 1,566,500 km^{2} (604,800 sq mi)
- Population: Total; Catholics: (as of 2022); 3,450,066; 1,432 (0.04%)
- Parishes: 6

Information
- Denomination: Roman Catholic
- Rite: Latin Rite
- Cathedral: Cathedral of St Peter and St Paul, Ulaanbaatar

Current leadership
- Pope: Leo XIV
- Prefect Apostolic: Cardinal Giorgio Marengo I.M.C.

Website
- Website of the Prefecture

The Apostolic Prefecture of Ulaanbaatar (Latin: Praefectura Apostolica Ulaanbaatarensis) is a Roman Catholic Latin apostolic prefecture (pre-diocesan missionary jurisdiction) located in Mongolia, with its territory consisting of the entire country.

Its cathedral episcopal see is the Cathedral of Saints Peter and Paul, in the capital city of Mongolia, Ulaanbaatar.

It is exempt, i.e. directly subject to the Holy See, not part of any ecclesiastical province.

On 28 August 2016, the Apostolic Prefecture of Ulaanbaatar celebrated the ordination of the first native Mongolian priest by Msgr. Wenceslao Padilla. Other seminarians are studying currently in South Korea.

== History ==
- Established on 14 March 1922 as Mission “sui iuris” of Outer Mongolia (Chinese: 外蒙古自治傳教區), on territory split off from the Apostolic Vicariate of Central Mongolia
- Renamed in 1924 as Mission sui iuris of Urga (or Ulanbator)
- Promoted on 8 July 2002 as Apostolic Prefecture of Ulaanbaatar, but still not entitled to a titular bishop.

== Statistics ==
As of 2014, the prefecture had 919 Catholics (0.03% of 3,227,000 total) on 1,564,120 km^{2} in six parishes and a mission with 17 priests (14 religious and three diocesan), 61 in religious life (43 female, 18 male) and 2 seminarians.

== Ordinaries ==
- All missionary members of Latin congregations, notably Scheutists

Ecclesiastical Superiors of Outer Mongolia

- Apostolic Administrator Girolamo van Aertselaer, C.I.C.M. (1922 – 1924), also Apostolic Vicar of the then Apostolic Vicariate of Chahaer 察哈爾 (China) & Titular Bishop of Zaraï (1898-05-07 – 1924-01-12)

Ecclesiastical Superiors of Urga = Urgoo (or Ulaanbaatar)

- Apostolic Administrator Everard Ter Laak, C.I.C.M. (1924 – 5 May 1931), also Coadjutor Apostolic Vicar of Chahaer 察哈爾 (China) & Titular Bishop of Parœcopolis (1914-05-06 – 1931-05-05); previously Apostolic Vicar of Southern Kansu 甘肅南境 (China) (1906-06-21 – 1914-05-06) and Apostolic Vicar of Chahaer (China) (1924-01-12 – 1924-12-03); later Apostolic Vicar of Xiwanzi 西灣子 (China) (1924-12-03 – 1931-05-05)
- Fr. Wenceslao Selga Padilla, C.I.C.M. (19 April 1992 – 8 July 2002; see below)

Apostolic Prefects of Ulaanbaatar

- Wenceslao Selga Padilla, C.I.C.M. (8 July 2002 – 25 September 2018), Titular Bishop of Tharros (2003-08-02 – 2018-09-25)
- Cardinal Giorgio Marengo, I.M.C. (2 April 2020 – present), Cardinal-Priest of San Giuda Taddeo Apostolo (2022–present)

== See also ==
- List of Catholic dioceses (structured view)
- Catholic Church in Mongolia

== Sources and external links ==
- GCatholic.org, with incumbent biography links - data for all sections
- Catholic Hierarchy
