= San Giuda Taddeo Apostolo =

- Church of Saint Judas Thaddeus the Apostle
- San Giuda Taddeo ai Cessati Spiriti
- Chiesa di San Giuda Taddeo Apostolo
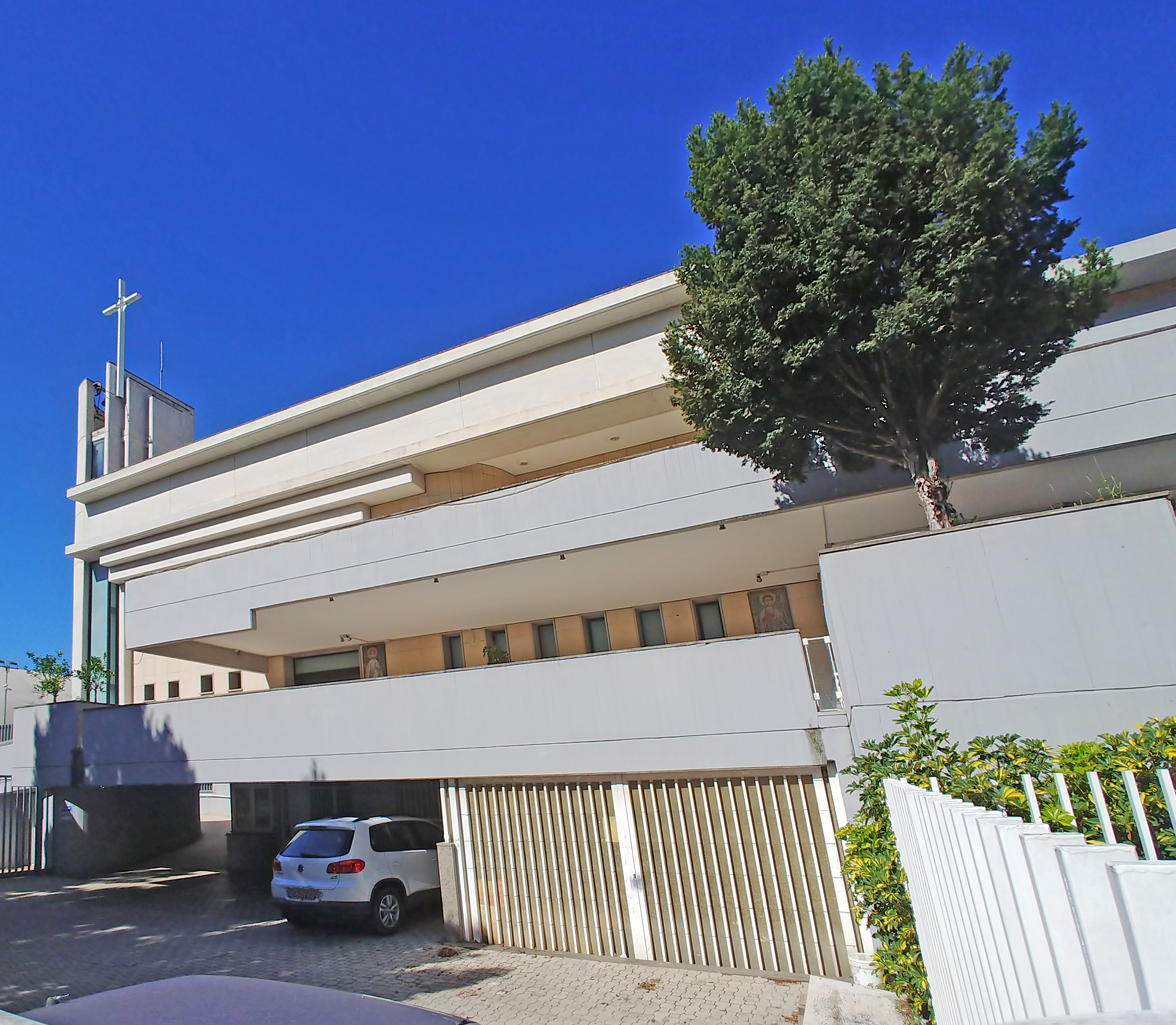
- Click on the map for a fullscreen view
- 41°52′04″N 12°31′34″E
- Location: Via Amadeo Crivellucci 3, Rome
- Country: Italy
- Language: Italian
- Denomination: Catholic
- Tradition: Roman Rite
- Website: parrocchiasangiudataddeo.it

History
- Status: titular church
- Founded: 1994
- Dedication: Judas Thaddeus

Architecture
- Architect(s): Giuseppe Forti, Roberto Spaccasassi
- Architectural type: Modern
- Completed: 1996

Administration
- Diocese: Rome

The church of San Giuda Taddeo Apostolo is a Catholic place of worship located in the Appio-Latino district of Rome, in via Amedeo Crivellucci. It is also known by its location as San Giuda Taddeo ai Cessati Spiriti after the nearest broad street, the Via Cessati Spiriti.

== History and description ==
Cardinal Vicar Clemente Micara erected a new parish of San Giuda Taddeo on 18 May 1960, entrusting it to the diocesan clergy of Rome.

The building that now serves as the parish church was constructed in 1994-1996 to designs by architects Giuseppe Forti and Roberto Spaccasassi. On the occasion of the Jubilee of 2000, the diocese of Rome commissioned the artist Oliviero Rainaldi to produce several works for the church:

- the decoration of the apse with a composite work of mosaic and plaster bas-reliefs, depicting the passage from the book of Revelation, chapters 7-9;
- a high relief in plaster and brass, depicting the Last Supper;
- a bas-relief in plaster, depicting the Risen Christ, of about 50 m² in surface;
- a plaster statue, depicting a Madonna and Child, 270 cm high.

Next to the main altar, there is a statue that represents the apostle Jude Thaddeus holding a cloth with the face of Jesus imprinted on it.

On the choir in the counter façade there is the pipe organ, built in 1950 by the Zarantonello company and installed in 2016 by Giuseppe Ponzani.

On 31 October 2012, the name of the parish was changed to "San Giuda Taddeo Apostolo".

Pope Francis established the cardinal's title of "San Giuda Taddeo Apostolo" on 28 November 2020.

== Cardinal-Priests ==
- Cornelius Sim, Apostolic Vicar of Brunei (28 November 2020 – 29 May 2021)
- Giorgio Marengo, Apostolic Prefect of Ulaanbaatar (27 August 2022 – present)
