= Giorgio Marengo =

Italian prelate of the Catholic Church (born 1974)

His Eminence Giorgio Marengo I.M.C.
- Apostolic Prefect of Ulaanbaatar
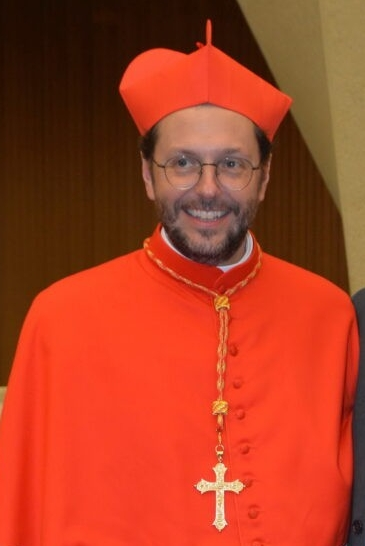
- Marengo in 2022
- Church: Catholic
- See: Ulaanbaatar
- In office: 2 April 2020
- Predecessor: Wenceslao Selga Padilla
- Other posts: Cardinal-Priest of San Guida Taddeo Apostolo (2022–present); Member, Dicastery for Evangelization (2022–present)
- Previous posts: Priest at Mary Mother of Mercy parish in Arvaikheer; Titular Bishop of Castra Severiana (2020–2022)

Orders
- Ordination: 26 May 2001 by Severino Poletto
- Consecration: 8 August 2020 by Luis Antonio Tagle
- Created cardinal: 27 August 2022 by Pope Francis
- Rank: Cardinal priest

Personal details
- Born: Giorgio Marengo; 7 June 1974 (age 52) Cuneo, Italy
- Education: Pontifical Urban University
- Motto: Respicite ad eum et illuminamini (Latin for 'Look towards Him and be enlightened')
- Coat of arms: Giorgio Marengo's coat of arms

Styles of Giorgio Marengo
- Reference style: His Eminence
- Spoken style: Your Eminence
- Religious style: Cardinal
- Informal style: Cardinal
- See: Ulaanbaatar

Giorgio Marengo, I.M.C. (Mongolian: Жиоржио Маренго; born 7 June 1974) is an Italian prelate of the Catholic Church. Created a cardinal by Pope Francis on 27 August 2022, he has been the Apostolic Prefect of Ulaanbaatar, a missionary jurisdiction that covers the entire country of Mongolia, since 2 April 2020.

He is the second youngest member of the College of Cardinals.

== Biography ==
Marengo was born in Cuneo on 7 June 1974. He is part of the scouts, practices fencing and he graduated at a classical lyceum.

He studied philosophy from 1993 to 1995 at the Theological Faculty of Northern Italy and theology from 1996 to 1999 at the Pontifical Gregorian University. He studied at the Pontifical Urban University from 1999 to 2002, earning a licentiate and later on (2016) a doctorate in missiology. On 24 June 2000, he made his profession of vows as a Consolata Missionary, and he was ordained a priest on 26 May 2001 .

The first member (together with a confrere and 3 religious sisters) of his order to work in Mongolia, he has served there since becoming a priest.

From 2016 to 2020 he was his order's regional councilor of Asia, superior of the Consolata Missionaries for Mongolia and parish priest at Mary Mother of Mercy parish in Arvaikheer.

On 2 April 2020 Pope Francis appointed him apostolic prefect of Ulaanbaatar and titular bishop of Castra Severiana. He succeeded Wenceslao Selga Padilla, who died on 25 September 2018. He was consecrated in the Santuario della Consolata on 8 August 2020 by Cardinal Luis Antonio Tagle, assisting him were Archbishop Cesare Nosiglia, Archbishop of Turin and Cardinal Severino Poletto, Archbishop-emeritus of Turin.

When Pope Francis announced on 29 May 2022 that he planned to make Marengo a cardinal on 27 August, Marengo was in Rome to participate in a meeting he had arranged between the pope and Buddhist leaders from Mongolia. He said: "Dialogue with the Buddhist world, which is a majority in Mongolia, is fundamental for us, it is part of our mission. I am sure it will bear good fruit."

On 27 August 2022, Pope Francis made him a Cardinal-Priest, assigning him the title of San Giuda Taddeo Apostolo. On 7 October 2022, Pope Francis appointed him as a member of the Dicastery for Evangelization. He participated as a cardinal elector in the 2025 papal conclave that elected Pope Leo XIV.

== Publications ==
- Sussurrare il Vangelo nella terra dell'eterno Cielo blu, riflessioni missiologiche sull'evangelizzazione in Mongolia; Urbaniana University Press, Via Urbano VIII, 16 – 00165 Rome, Italy.

== See also ==
- Cardinals created by Pope Francis

Catholic Church titles
Preceded by Wenceslao Padilla	Apostolic Prefect of Ulaanbaatar; 2 April 2020–present	Incumbent
