= Saints Peter and Paul Cathedral (Ulaanbaatar) =

Church in Bayanzürkh, Ulaanbaatar, Mongolia

Ecclesia cathedralis Sanctorum Petri et Pauli Гэгээн Петр, Паулын цогчин дуган
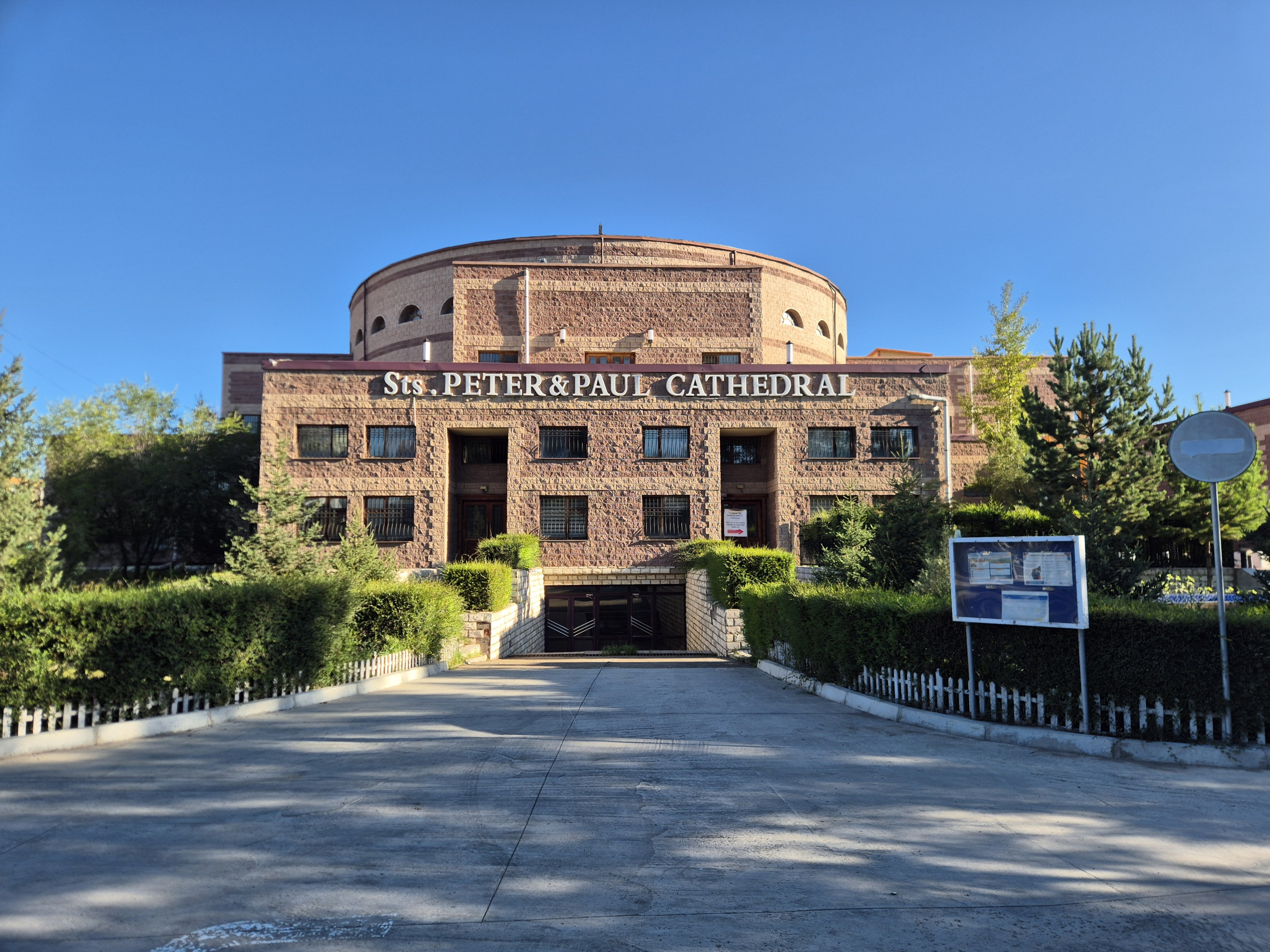

Religion
- Affiliation: Roman Catholic
- Rite: Latin
- Ecclesiastical or organisational status: Cathedral
- Leadership: Cardinal Giorgio Marengo
- Year consecrated: 2003
- Status: Active

Location
- Location: Bayanzürkh, Ulaanbaatar, Mongolia
- Interactive map of Ecclesia cathedralis Sanctorum Petri et Pauli; Гэгээн Петр, Паулын цогчин дуган
- Coordinates: 47°54′43″N 106°58′33″E

Architecture
- Architect: Predrag Stupar
- Type: Church
- Style: Eclecticism
- Completed: 2002

Website
- www.sppcathedral.com

The Saints Peter and Paul Cathedral is a Roman Catholic cathedral in Bayanzürkh, Ulaanbaatar, Mongolia, designed by Serbian architect Predrag Stupar and consecrated in 2003 by Cardinal Crescenzio Sepe; its shape resembles that of a yurt.

It is the official episcopal see of the Apostolic Prefecture of Ulaanbaatar.

== Building ==
It has 36 semicircular windows and a window in the skylight. They were added by 2005, and were part of a project of Brother Mark, a member of the Taizé Community. The windows depict the four evangelists in their symbolic forms: an eagle, an angel, a yak and a snow leopard. The latter two are the local reinterpretations of traditional Christian iconography, which replace the traditional winged bull and a winged lion. Inside is a statue of the Virgin Mary, venerated after being discovered in the rubbish in 2013.
