= List of mosques in Mongolia =

This is a list of mosques in Mongolia containing lists mosques (Arabic: Masjid, Mongolian: Исламын сүм,ᠢᠰᠯᠠᠮ ᠤ᠋ᠨ ᠰᠦᠮᠦ) and Islamic centres in Mongolia, Asia.

The Constitution of Mongolia guarantees freedom of religion but also stipulates the separation of religion and state. Under the Law on Relations between the State and Religious Organizations (1993), all places of worship and religious groups are required to obtain a license from local authorities. Registration must be periodically renewed, and without it, organizations cannot legally operate or own land for religious purposes.

The government states that licensing is necessary to ensure transparency, monitor foreign-funded activities, and maintain social harmony. However, human rights groups and minority religious communities have criticized the process as overly bureaucratic and sometimes discriminatory.

According to USCIRF 2012 Mongolia have 40 mosques in Mongolia. On government records only 27 mosques are in the country.

== List ==
Bayan-Ölgii Province
Name	Image	Location	Denomination	Century	Remarks
Bulgan Mosque		Bulgan			
Abu-Bakr Siddiq Central Mosque		Ölgii		1992	
Khydyrata-Nurana Mosque		Ölgii			
Sherkhan Mosque		Ölgii		2002	
Kilegei Mosque		Ölgii			
Ar-Rahman As-Salem Mosque		Ölgii			

Darkhan-Uul Province
Name	Image	Location	Denomination	Century	Remarks
Bilal Habsi Sharyngol Mosque		Sharyngol		2019	
Khongor Mosque		Erdenet Khongor		2007	
Ibrai Uly Sultan Mosque					
Darkhan-Uul Cultural Center and Mosque		Darkhan			

Ulaanbaatar- (Capital of Mongolia)
Name	Image	Location	Denomination	Century	Remarks
Nalaikh Mosque		Nalaikh	Sunni Islam, following the Hanafi Madhab	2013	
Ulaanbaatar Central Mosque		Bayangol	Sunni Islam	Incomplete	
Makka Mosque		Nalaikh	Sunni Islam, following the Hanafi Madhab		
Tolgoit Mosque		Songino Khairkhan	Sunni Islam, following the Hanafi Madhab		
Ali ibn Abitaalib Mosque		Bayanzürkh	Sunni Islam, following the Hanafi Madhab	2017	
Mongolia Ulaanbaatar Peace Islamic Center		Bayanzürkh	Sunni Islam, following the Hanafi Madhab		
Seoul Business Center Mosque		Bayanzürkh	Sunni Islam, following the Hanafi Madhab		

== See also ==
- Islam in Mongolia
- Lists of mosques
