= Ulaanbaatar Central Mosque =

Incomplete Mosque in Bayangol, Ulaanbaatar, Mongolia

- Улаанбаатар Tөв Cүм
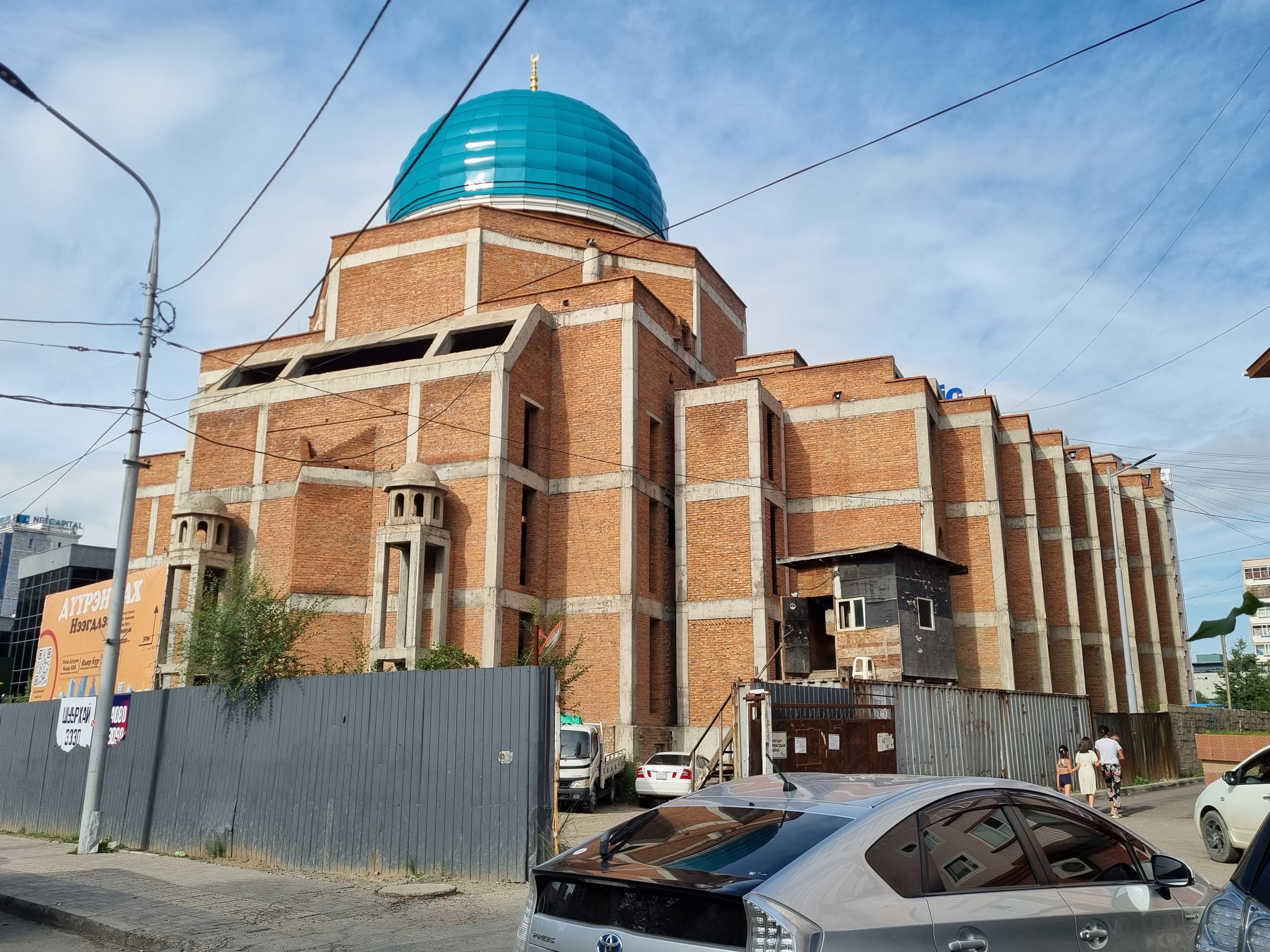

Religion
- Affiliation: Islam
- Branch/tradition: Sunni

Location
- Location: Bayangol
- Municipality: Ulaanbaatar
- Country: Mongolia
- Interactive map of Ulaanbaatar Central Mosque
- Coordinates: 47.91394°N 106.88472°E

Architecture
- Type: mosque
- Groundbreaking: 2010
- Dome: 1-Big • 4-small

The Ulaanbaatar Central Mosque (Mongolian: Улаанбаатар Tөв Cүм) is an incomplete, non-functional mosque located in Bayangol District, Ulaanbaatar, Mongolia.

== History ==
Plans for the construction of the mosque were launched in 2010 with the support of the city authorities and representatives of the local Muslim community.

Although unfinished, part of the building may in the past have been adapted for use as a small prayer hall. The mosque may also have contained a modest library of Islamic literature collected from across Mongolia. If it serves as a gathering place particularly for the city's ethnic Kazakh Muslims, who represent the majority of the country's Muslim population, there was no sign of them at the time for Friday prayers on 17/10/2025.

== See also ==
- Islam in Mongolia
- Nalaikh Mosque
- List of mosques in Mongolia
