= Islam in Mongolia =

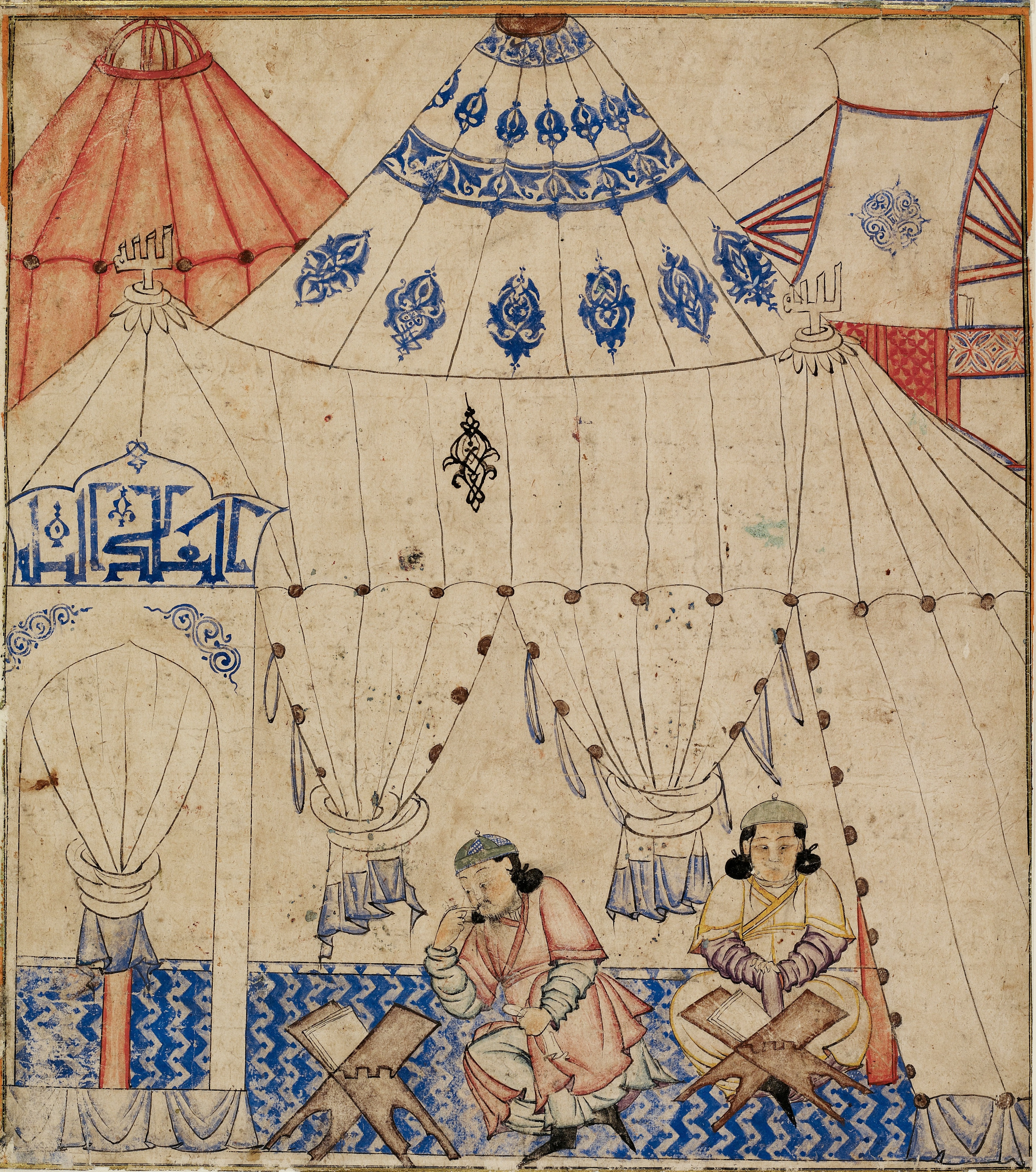
A Mongol prince, Ghazan, studying the Quran

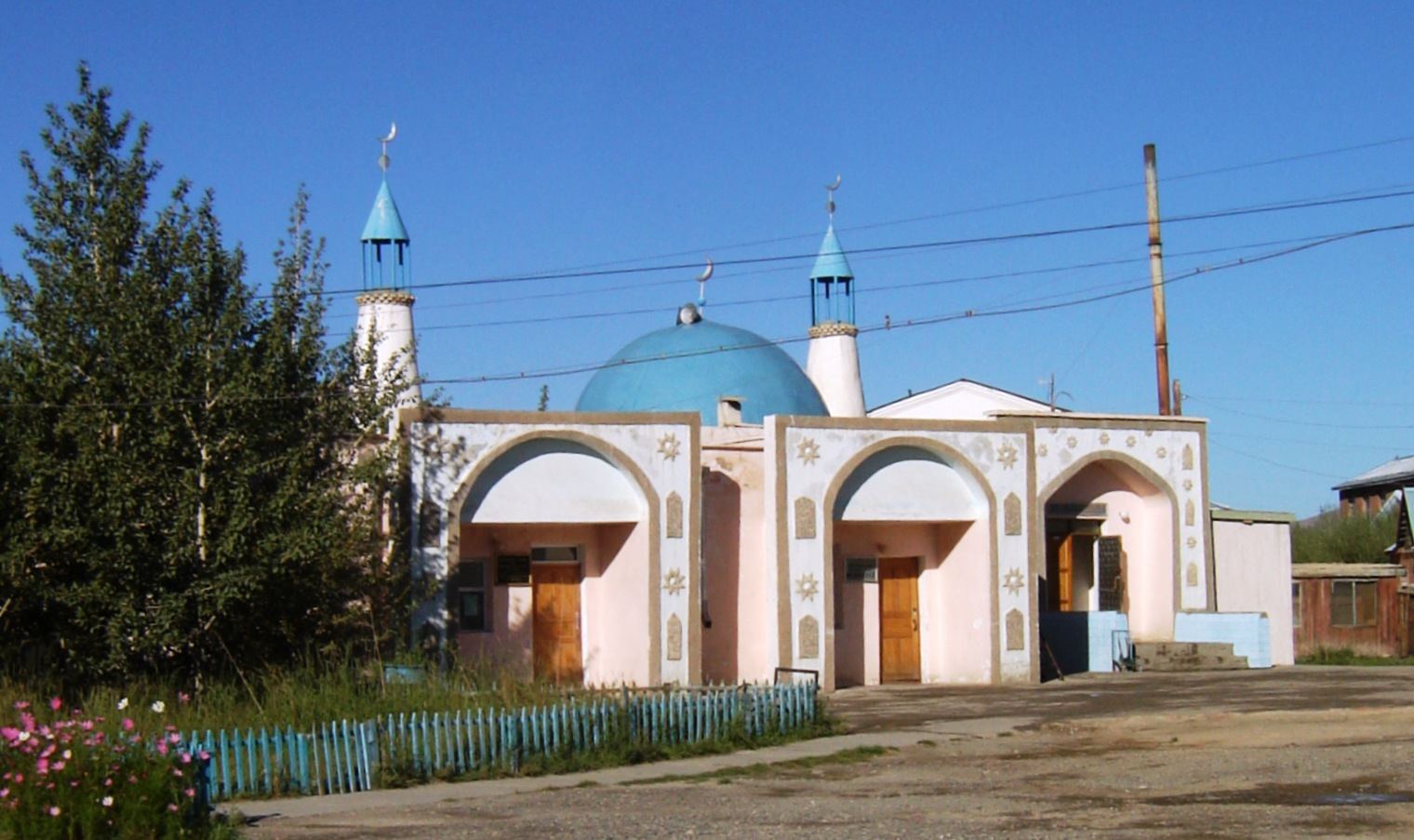
Abu-Bakr Siddiq Central Mosque, the main mosque in Ölgii

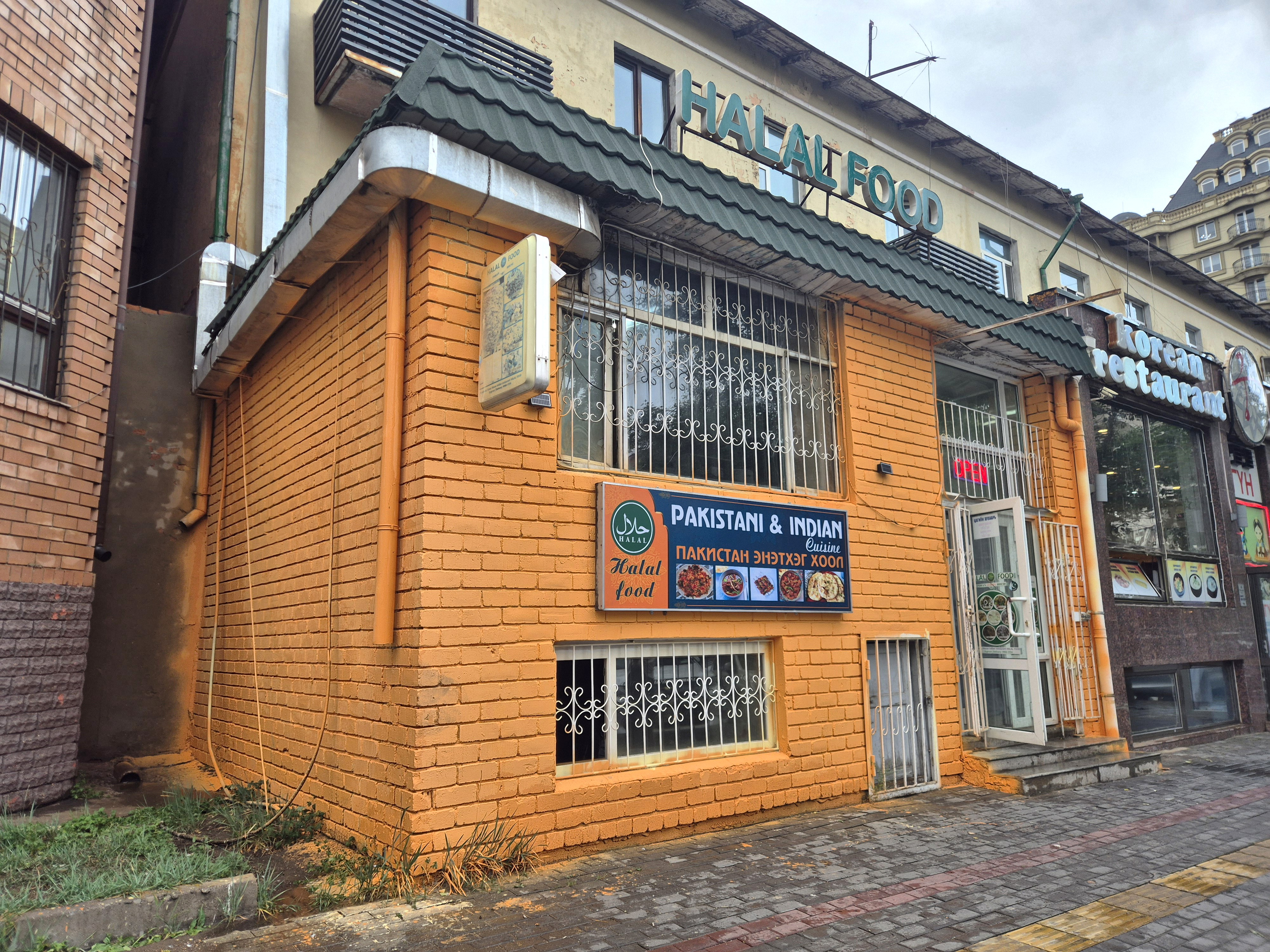
A halal restaurant in Ulaanbaatar

As of 2022, Islam in Mongolia, is practiced by approximately 5.4% of those who identify with a religion, according to the USCIRF. Given that 59.4 percent of the population reported having a religious identity in the 2020 census, Muslims constitute roughly 3.2 percent of the total population It is practised by the ethnic Kazakhs of Bayan-Ölgii Province (88.7% of total aimag population) and Khovd Province (11.5% of total aimag population, living primarily in the Khovd city, Khovd district, and Buyant district) in western Mongolia. In addition, a number of small Kazakh communities can be found in various cities and towns spread throughout the country. Islam is also practiced by the smaller communities of Khotons and Uyghurs.

Some Mongolian Muslims fused elements from Buddhism into their beliefs, even thinking of the Buddha as synonymous to Adam, the first prophet in Islam, although this does not happen in modern times.

== History ==
=== Early period ===
The earliest recorded evidence of Islam in Mongolia is dated to 1254, when the Franciscan William of Rubruck visited the court of the great khan Mongka at Karakorum. He celebrated Easter at a Nestorian Christian church but also noted seven temples of the "idolators" (possibly Buddhist, Hindu and Taoist temples) and two mosques. Therefore, historians date the arrival of Islam to Mongolia to between 1222 and 1254. Islam also gained the notice of the Mongols after Genghis Khan invaded Afghanistan. In 1222, on his way back to Mongolia, he visited Bukhara in Transoxiana. It was believed he inquired about Islam, and subsequently approved of Muslim tenets except the Hajj, considering it unnecessary. Nevertheless, he continued his worship of Tengri as his ancestors had done.

Genghis Khan and the following Yuan emperors forbade Islamic practices like Halal butchering, forcing Mongol methods of butchering animals on Muslims, and other restrictive degrees continued. Muslims had to slaughter sheep in secret. Genghis Khan directly called Muslims and Jews "slaves" and demanded that they follow the Mongol method of eating rather than the halal method. Circumcision was also forbidden. Jews were also affected and forbidden by the Mongols to eat Kosher.

Among all the [subject] alien peoples only the Hui-hui say "we do not eat Mongol food". [Cinggis Qa'an replied:] "By the aid of heaven we have pacified you; you are our slaves. Yet you do not eat our food or drink. How can this be right?" He thereupon made them eat. "If you slaughter sheep, you will be considered guilty of a crime." He issued a regulation to that effect ... [In 1279/1280 under Qubilai] all the Muslims say: "if someone else slaughters [the animal] we do not eat". Because the poor people are upset by this, from now on, Musuluman [Muslim] Huihui, and Zhuhu [Jewish] Huihui, no matter who kills [the animal] will eat [it] and must cease slaughtering sheep themselves, and cease the rite of circumcision.

Genghis Khan's grandson Berke converted to Islam due to the efforts of Saif ud-Din Dervish, a dervish from Khorazm; thus, Berke became one of the first Mongol rulers to convert. Other Mongol leaders owed their conversion to Islam due to the influence of a Muslim wife. Later, it was the Mamluk ruler Baibars who played an important role in bringing many Golden Horde Mongols to Islam. Baibars developed strong ties with the Mongols of the Golden Horde and took steps for the Golden Horde Mongols to travel to Egypt. The arrival of the Golden Horde Mongols to Egypt resulted in a significant number of Mongols accepting Islam. By the 1330s, three of the four major khanates of the Mongol Empire had become Muslim. These were the Jochi's Ulus, Hulagu's Ulus and Chagatai's Ulus. The Yuan Empire also embraced Muslim peoples such as the Persians.

Although the court of the Yuan Empire adopted Tibetan Buddhism as the official religion, the majority of the ordinary Mongols, especially those who continued living in Mongolia proper, remained Shamanists. After the decline of the Yuan Dynasty, Shamanism once again became the dominant religion. To varying degrees, political and economic relations with Muslim nations such as Moghulistan continued.

=== Modern era ===
The Muslim Khotons were transferred to western Mongolia from Xinjiang in the 17th or 18th century by the Dzungar Khanate. Most Khotons today live in Uvs province. A small number of Uyghurs also live in Mongolia and mainly reside in Khovd. A few also live in Bayan-Ölgii.

During the Qing dynasty, Chinese Muslims settled in Mongolia for mercantile purposes and soon developed religious infrastructures for their communities. Many of these Muslims originated from northern China.

The Muslim Kazakhs began to settle in the Dzungaria and Altai regions in the late nineteenth century. The majority of these Kazakhs were the Kerei and Naiman clans, many of them escaping persecution in Czarist Russia and Qing China. When Bogd Khan assumed power in Mongolia on December 29, 1911, the Kazakhs in Xinjiang and Altai regions sought the patronage of the restored Khanate. The government of Bogd Khan admitted them and allowed them to settle in the western region of Mongolia's Khovd Province.

=== Communist era ===
Bayan-Ölgii aimag was established as part of the administrative reforms of the Mongolian People's Republic in 1940. As a result of historically high birth rates, the Muslim population in Mongolia increased between 1956 and 1989. However, there was a decline in the Muslim population in 1990-1993 due to the large wave of repatriation of ethnic Kazakhs (so-called oralmans) to Kazakhstan following the break-up of the Soviet Union. In 1990, Mongolian Muslim Society established by Khoton Muslims.

== Demographics ==
Friday prayer in Nalaikh, Ulaanbaatar

Islam is currently practiced predominately in the western portion of the country as well as in Mongolia's capital. Some of the major population centers with a significant Muslim presence include Ulaanbaatar (90% in khoroo #4 of Nalaikh düüreg), Töv and Selenge aimags, Erdenet, Darkhan, Bulgan, Sharyngol (17.1% of population total) and Berkh cities.

The Mongolian Muslim Association states there are approximately 130,000 Kazakh Muslims (mostly in Bayan-Olgiy) and 20,000 Khoton Muslims residing primarily in the province of Uvs, which in total would constitute approximately 5 percent of the country’s population.

Muslim ethnic groups of Mongolia national censuses data
Year	Population	Percent
1956	36,729	4.34%
1963	47,735	4.69%
1969	62,812	5.29%
1979	84,305	5.48%
1989	120,506	6.06%
2000	102,983	4.35%
2007	140,152	5.39%

== Institution ==
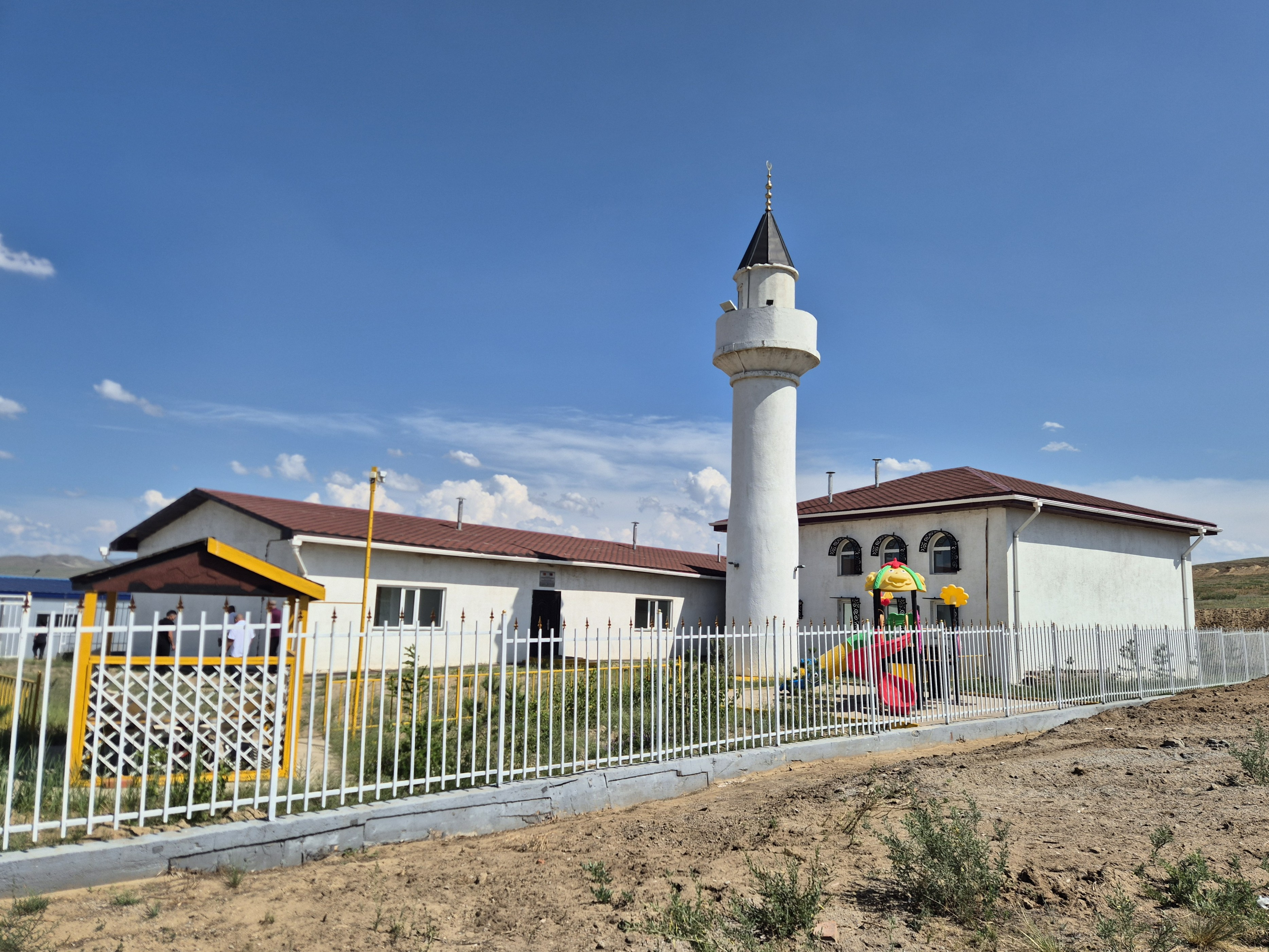
Darkhan-Uul Cultural Center and Mosque in Darkhan, Darkhan-Uul

Ulaanbaatar has 4 Muslim organisations registered at Ulaanbaatar Hural office.

The Mongolian Islamic Religious Association Muftiat, established in 2004. There was also a Mongolian Muslim Society established by Khoton Muslims in 1990, but the Muftiat is the primary state-recognized religious association.

There are currently 40 mosques in Mongolia.

- Nalaikh Mosque
- Abu-Bakr Siddiq Central Mosque
- Ulaanbaatar Central Mosque
- Khalkhin Mosque

== Quran ==
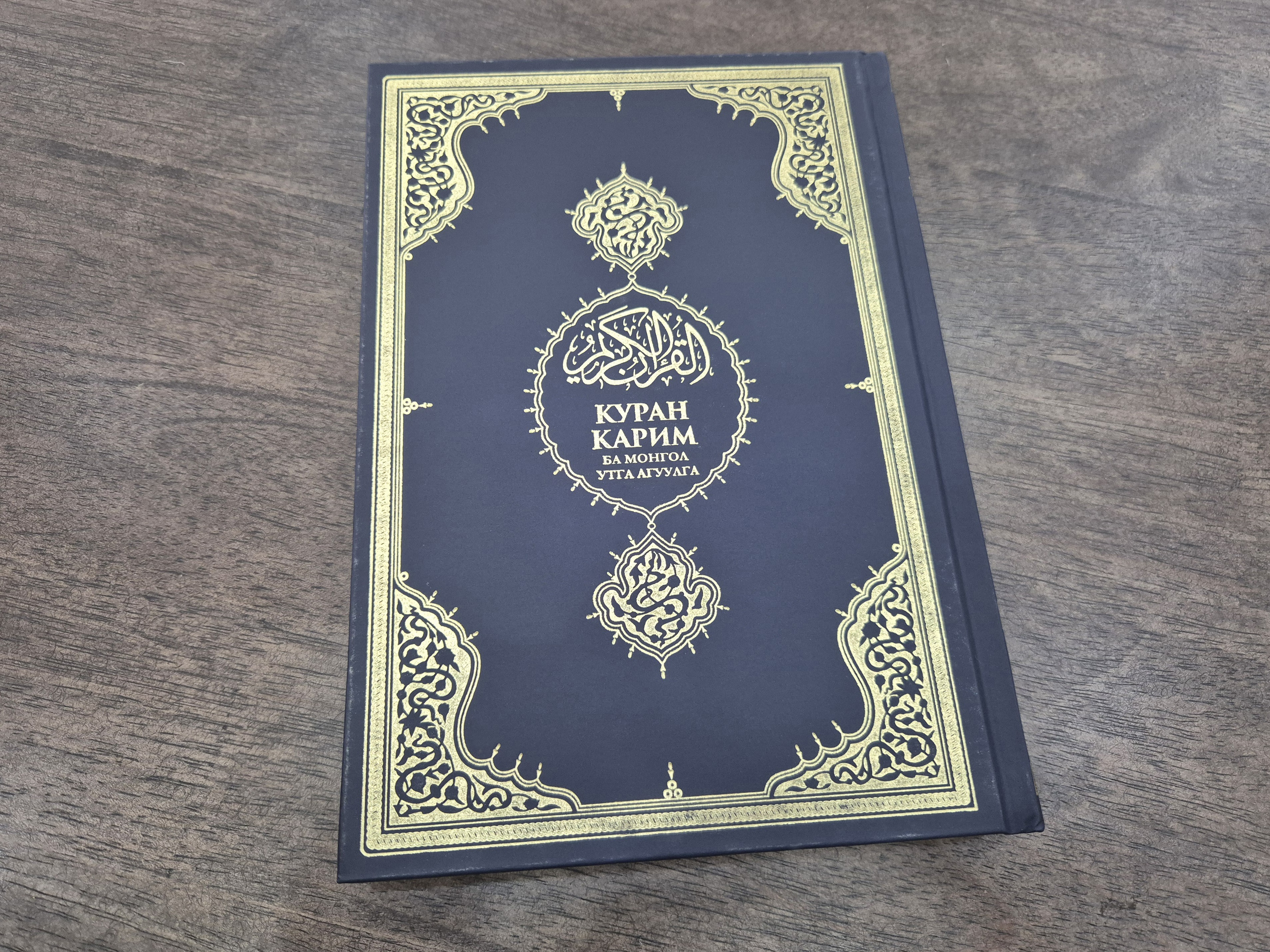
Quran with Mongolian translation produced in 2020

The works of creating Quran with Mongolian translation began since 2008 with limited editions. The current most acceptable Quran with Mongolian translation in Mongolia is the Koran Sudrϊn produced in 2020 and published by the Turkish Directorate of Religious Affairs.

== Halal certification ==
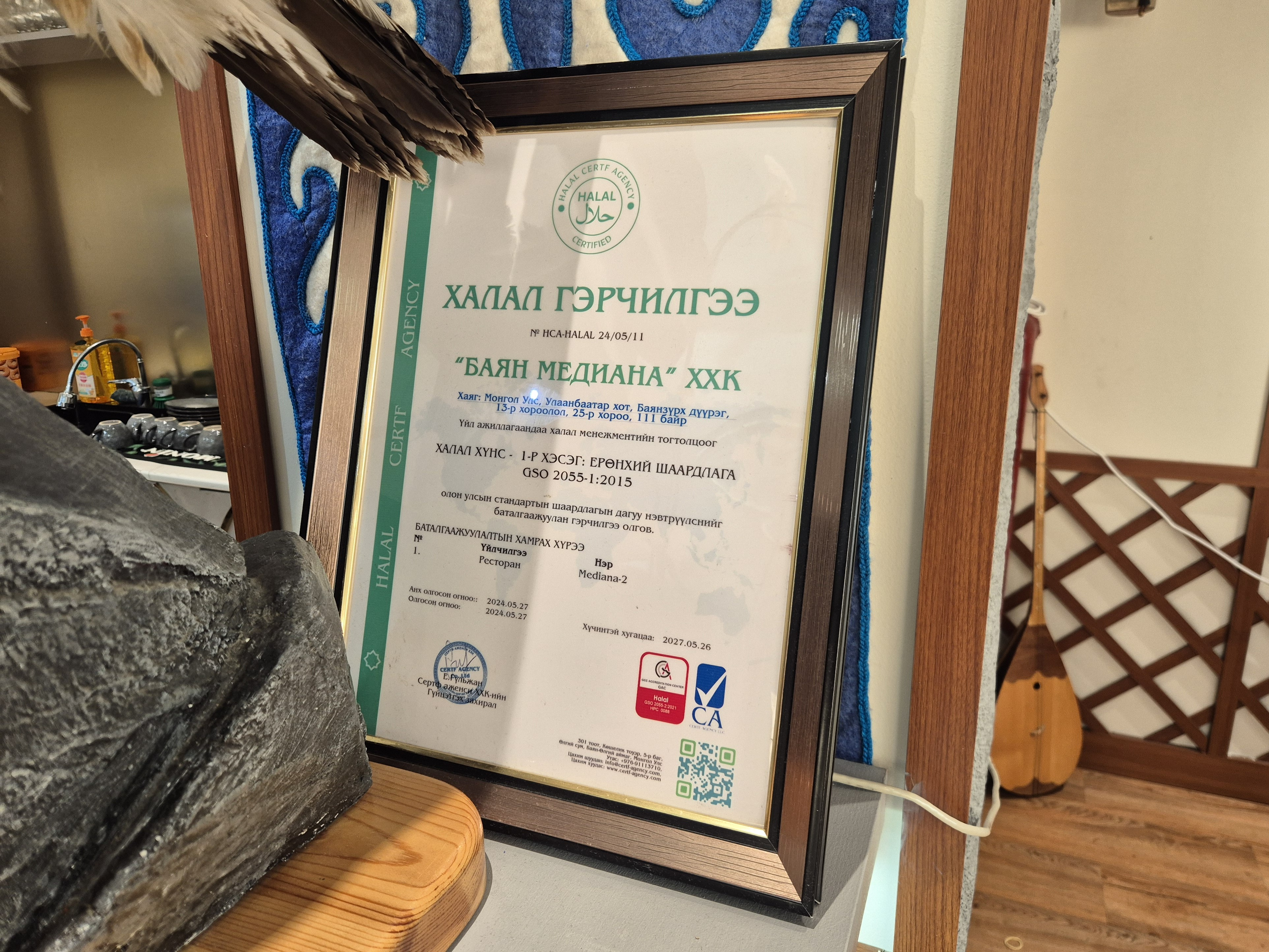
Halal certificate of local restaurant

On 20 December 2023, the Mongolian Agency for Standard Metrology was granted accreditation for halal food product certification meeting the requirements of the Gulf Cooperation Council Accreditation Center, which enabled the agency to issue halal certification for food produced in the country for exports. The first halal certification issued by the agency was on 12 August 2024 to two local food companies, Dornod Makh Market LLC and Trust Group LLC.

=== Slaughterhouses ===
Mongolia has a total of four halal slaughter houses, including one in Darkhan. It exports mutton to countries like Iran. Another halal slaughter house is operated by Trust Trade LLC.

In Bayan-Ölgii Province, the Healthy Mongolian Company and Araltobe Cooperative halal slaughter house operate in the region and sell meat to the province and also to Ulaanbaatar.

== Notable Mongol Muslims ==
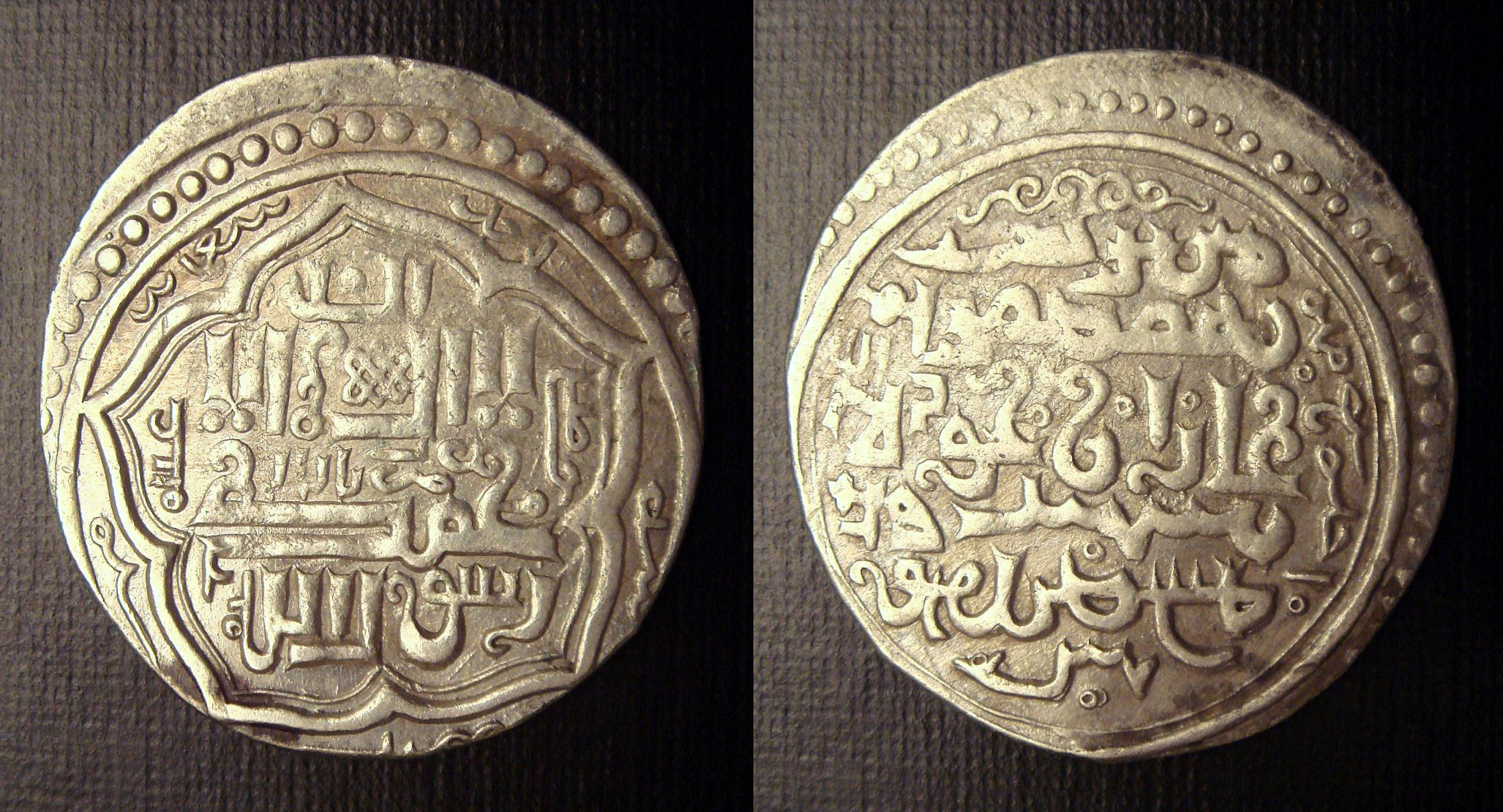
Ghazan's coins were minted with the Islamic declaration of faith

=== Ethnic Mongolians ===
- Berke - grandson of Genghis Khan and leader of the Golden Horde who was the first Mongol ruler to establish Islam in a Mongol state.
- Ghazan - seventh ruler of the Ilkhanate.
- Muhammad Khodabandeh - formerly a Christian, he was the eighth Ilkhanid dynasty ruler in Iran from 1304 to 1316.
- Mubarak Shah - head of the ulus of the Chagatai Khanate (1252–1260, March–September 1266).
- Nawrūz (Mongol emir) - a convert to Islam; he played an important role in the politics of the Mongol Ilkhanate.
- Negudar - Mongol general and noyan
- Nogai Khan - Mongol general and great-grandson of Genghis Khan.
- Tarmashirin - Khan of the Chagatai Khanate following Duwa Timur.
- Tekuder - Mongol leader of the Ilkhan empire who was formerly a Nestorian Christian.
- Tuda Mengu - Mongol leader of the Golden Horde
- Tughlugh Timur - the Khan of Moghulistan.
- Öljei Temür Khan, also known as Buyanshir Khan after he converted to Islam while he stayed at the court of Timur in Samarkand.

=== Ethnic Kazakhs ===
- Huanbai Askerkhan, a poet

== See also ==
- Religion in Mongolia
