= Ölgii (city) =

City in Bayan-Ölgii, Mongolia

Ölgii Өлгий ᠥᠯᠦᠭᠡᠢ
- City and District

Official Cyrillic transcription(s)
  - Mongolian Cyrillic: Өлгий сум

Classical Mongolian transcription(s)
  - Mongolian script: ᠥᠯᠦᠭᠡᠢᠰᠤᠮᠤ
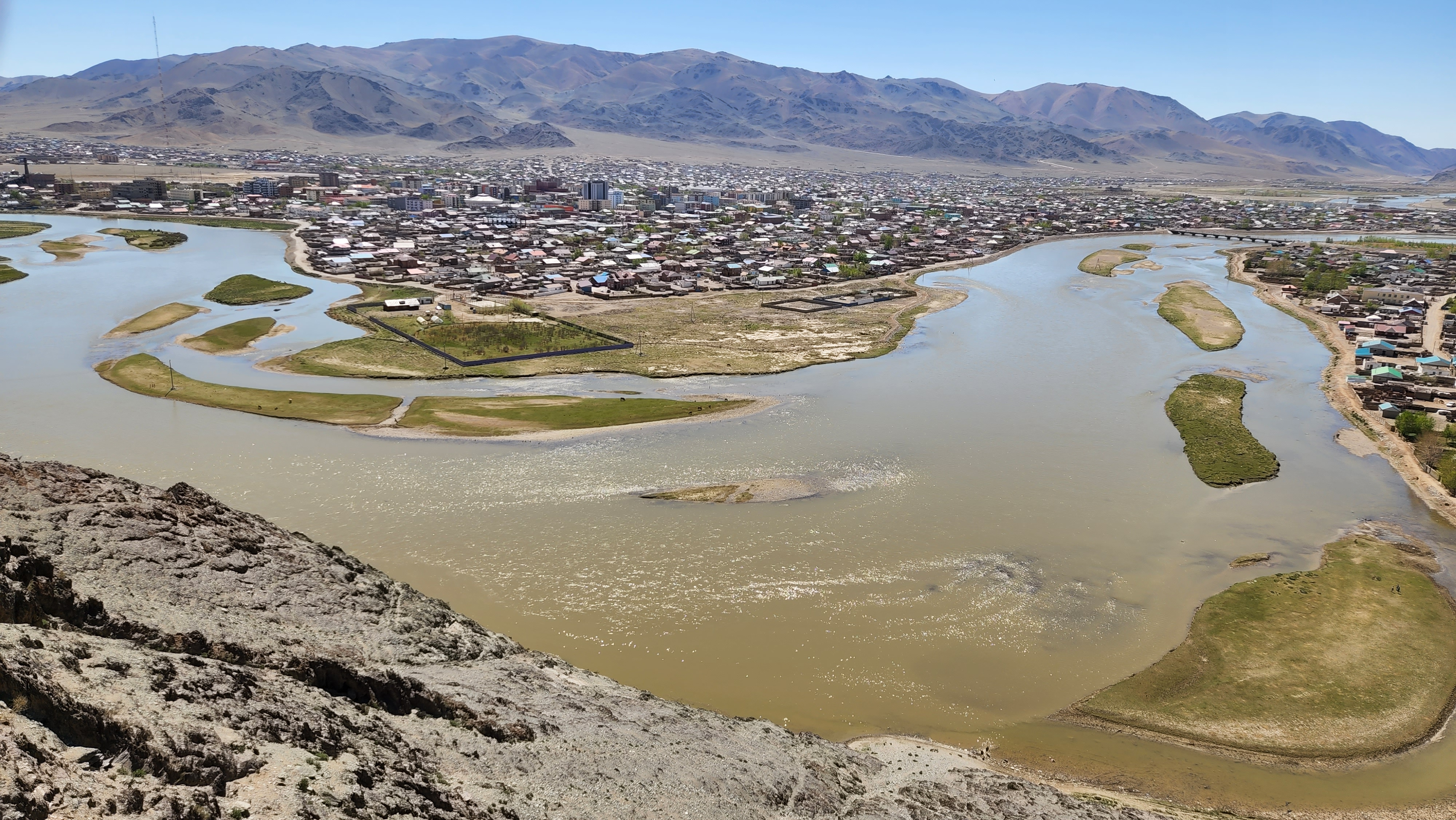
- Ölgii and Khovd River

- Location in Mongolia
- Coordinates: 48°58′06″N 89°58′07″E
- Country: Mongolia
- Province: Bayan-Ölgii
- Established: 1940
- Designed as a seat of government: 1940
- Granted city status: 1961
- Granted district status: 1992
- Bags: 13 bags: Khust aral; Tsagaan ereg; Bökhön uul; Ikh bulan; Khovd gol; Khökh tolgoi; Khotgor; Jargalant; Khökh khad; Khar sai; Bürged; Nogoon tögöl; Shine ail

Government
  - Zasag darga (Governor): Bolatbyek Kharapat

Area
  - Total: 103.51 km^{2} (39.97 sq mi)
- Elevation: 1,710 m (5,610 ft)

Population (2024)
  - Total: 50,126
  - Density: 484.26/km^{2} (1,254.2/sq mi)
- Time zone: UTC+7
- Area code: +976 (0)142
- License plate: БӨ_ (_variable)
- Website: olgii.bo.gov.mn

Ölgii (Note: Mongolian: Өлгий, romanized: Ölgii, mongolized: ᠥᠯᠦᠭᠡᠢ, pronounced [ɵɮkí]; Oirat: Өлгий, romanized: Ölgii, pronounced [ɵl̥ʲcíː]) is the capital of the Bayan-Ölgii Province of Mongolia, located in the westernmost part of the country on the banks of the Khovd River. It lies on an altitude of 1,710 meters (5,610 feet) and had a population of 50,126 people as of 2024.

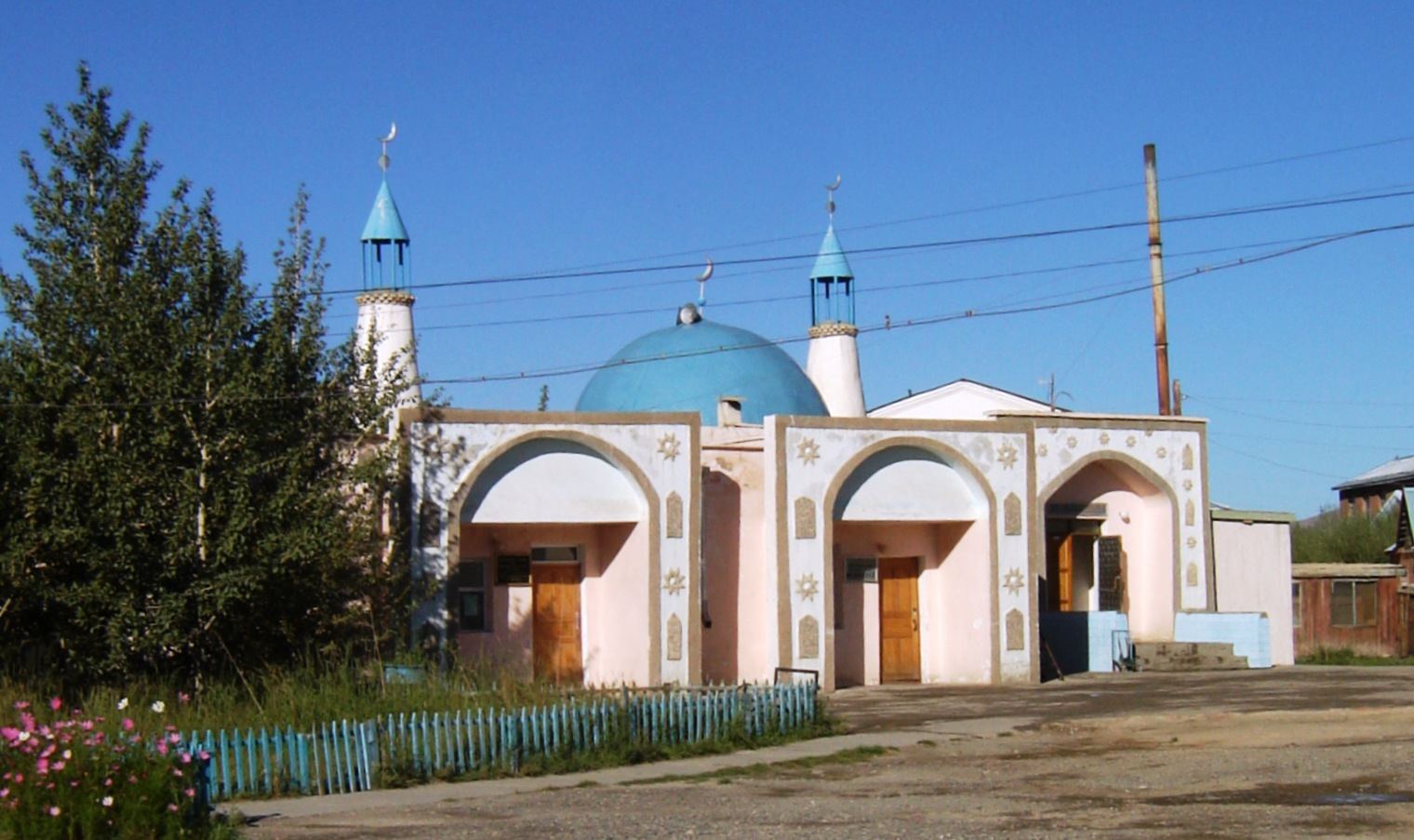
The Main Abu-Bakr Siddiq Mosque in Ölgii

== History ==
Ölgii was an ethnic Kazakh village before the founding of the modern nation of Mongolia in 1911. Kazakhs had been coming to the Altai region of Mongolia for at least 200 years. Many came as Kazakhs faced pressure from the expanding Russian Empire. These numbers increased significantly after the 1917 Russian Revolution and the rise of communism in China. It was the center of Islam in Mongolia before religious purges in the 1930s in which the mosque was destroyed and the imam was executed. Mongolia initially tried to suppress Kazakh language and culture before creating Bayan-Ölgii Aimag in 1939, with Ölgii as the seat of government. Later, by Decree No. 136 of June 1961 issued by the Presidium of the People’s Great Khural of the Mongolian People’s Republic, Ölgii was granted the status of city. In 1992, following the adoption of the new Constitution and the Law on Administrative and Territorial Units and Their Governance, Ölgii was reclassified as a district.

Much of the center of the city was built in the 1950s to 1980s. Ölgii developed less than the rest of Mongolia and was not connected by railroad or paved road due to its isolated location and lack of mineral resources. After the Mongolian democratic revolution in 1991 and the breakup of the Soviet Union, 25% of the population moved to newly independent Kazakhstan. Though, many later returned and the population has largely recovered. In recent years construction has increased significantly resulting in many new apartments, shops, restaurants, and hotels (most have been built since 2005), mirroring a construction boom throughout Mongolia.

Like other post-communist cities, much of the industry closed down in the 1990s, although a large wool factory and many smaller animal related factories continue to process products from the 2 million animals in the aimag.

== Administrative divisions ==
The district is divided into 13 bags, which are:

- Khust aral
- Tsagaan ereg
- Bökhön uul
- Ikh bulan
- Khovd gol
- Khökh tolgoi
- Khotgor
- Jargalant
- Khökh khad
- Khar sai
- Bürged
- Nogoon tögöl
- Shine ail

== Culture ==
The center of the predominantly Kazakh region of Mongolia, Kazakh is the primary language spoken in Ölgii. The city is home to at least 4 mosques. The city is known for its Kazakh embroidery and art, Kazakh music, and hunting with eagles. Each October, Ölgii hosts the annual Golden Eagle Festival which showcases the ancient Kazakh custom of eagle hunting.

== Climate ==
Ölgii experiences a subarctic-influenced desert climate (Köppen BWk, Trewartha BWlc) with long, very dry, very cold winters and short, mild to warm summers.

Climate data for Ölgii, elevation 1,720 m (5,640 ft), (1991–2020 normals, extremes 1959–present)
Month	Jan	Feb	Mar	Apr	May	Jun	Jul	Aug	Sep	Oct	Nov	Dec	Year
Record high °C (°F)	6.1 (43.0)	8.6 (47.5)	16.8 (62.2)	27.8 (82.0)	28.8 (83.8)	31.6 (88.9)	35.8 (96.4)	34.1 (93.4)	31.7 (89.1)	20.9 (69.6)	12.9 (55.2)	8.5 (47.3)	35.8 (96.4)
Mean daily maximum °C (°F)	−10.8 (12.6)	−5.4 (22.3)	2.2 (36.0)	10.7 (51.3)	16.6 (61.9)	22.4 (72.3)	24.1 (75.4)	22.2 (72.0)	15.9 (60.6)	7.9 (46.2)	−1.5 (29.3)	−8.9 (16.0)	8.0 (46.3)
Daily mean °C (°F)	−17.1 (1.2)	−12.9 (8.8)	−5.1 (22.8)	3.8 (38.8)	10.0 (50.0)	16.0 (60.8)	17.8 (64.0)	15.7 (60.3)	9.3 (48.7)	1.4 (34.5)	−7.3 (18.9)	−14.4 (6.1)	1.4 (34.6)
Mean daily minimum °C (°F)	−21.9 (−7.4)	−18.8 (−1.8)	−11.8 (10.8)	−2.9 (26.8)	3.6 (38.5)	9.9 (49.8)	12.2 (54.0)	9.7 (49.5)	3.0 (37.4)	−4.3 (24.3)	−12.0 (10.4)	−18.8 (−1.8)	−4.3 (24.2)
Record low °C (°F)	−40 (−40)	−36.1 (−33.0)	−32.2 (−26.0)	−23.9 (−11.0)	−17.8 (0.0)	−5.8 (21.6)	0.5 (32.9)	−2.2 (28.0)	−15.0 (5.0)	−24.2 (−11.6)	−32.8 (−27.0)	−38.9 (−38.0)	−40.0 (−40.0)
Average precipitation mm (inches)	0.9 (0.04)	0.7 (0.03)	2 (0.1)	5 (0.2)	15 (0.6)	25 (1.0)	35 (1.4)	26 (1.0)	7 (0.3)	2 (0.1)	2 (0.1)	1 (0.0)	122 (4.8)
Average precipitation days (≥ 1.0 mm)	1.3	1.2	1.6	2.0	3.3	5.8	6.7	5.9	2.8	1.3	1.5	1.8	35.1
Average relative humidity (%)	58.5	51.6	43.9	38.6	39.9	44.8	49.8	49.7	46.5	47.8	52.0	56.0	48.3
Source 1: Pogoda.ru.net
Source 2: NOAA

== Tourist attractions ==
- Central Library of Bayan-Ölgii Province
- Museum of Bayan-Ölgii Province

== Infrastructure ==
The Bayan-Ölgii Province longwave radio broadcast mast is located in Ölgii, and is Mongolia's tallest structure at 352.5 metres.

- General Hospital of Bayan-Ölgii Province

== Transportation ==
The Ölgii Airport (ULG/ZMUL) has one paved runway. It offers regular flights to Ulaanbaatar and Khovd and irregular flights to Ulaangom in Mongolia and Almaty in Kazakhstan via Oskemen Airport.

Bayan-Ölgii has border crossings with Russia and China. The Tsaagannuur Border crossing with Russia is open year-round and is the preferred route for traveling to and from Kazakhstan. This crossing does not have immigration offices. People will need to acquire a visa before going to the border. The Taikeshken border crossing with China is only open during the summer due to high mountain passes that become difficult to pass during winter months.

There are few paved roads in Bayan-Ölgii outside of Ölgii. Half the distance between Tsaagannuur village (30 km from the border crossing) and Ölgii is paved. The government of Mongolia plans to pave the Tsaagannuur to Ulaanbaatar route through Ölgii, Khovd, Govi-Altai, and Övörkhangai Provinces by 2015. Currently only Övörkhangai to Ulaanbaatar is paved, or 600 kilometres (370 mi) of the 1,600 kilometres (990 mi) distance.

Regularly scheduled buses connect Ölgii to Ulaanbaatar, with trips leaving three days a week. The non-stop trip is 48 hours under ideal conditions, though often lasting three to five days. Stops are made along the way for meals and restroom breaks.

== Twin towns and sister cities ==
Ölgii is twinned with:

- Altay, China
- Giresun, Turkey
- Mersin, Turkey

== Notable people ==
- Khuzkyein Darmyen (born 1964), engineer and Democratic Party politician. A graduate of Zaisanov Secondary School and the Polytechnic Institute in Ulaanbaatar in electrical engineering in 1987, he began his career as an engineer working at Erdenet Thermal Power Station, before being elected governor of the province three times.
