= Bagakhangai =

District in Ulaanbaatar, Mongolia

Coordinates: 47°21′20.2″N 107°29′18.2″E

Bagakhangai District Багахангай дүүрэг ᠪᠠᠭᠠᠬᠠᠩᠭ᠋ᠠᠢᠲᠡᠭᠦᠷᠭᠡ
- Municipal District
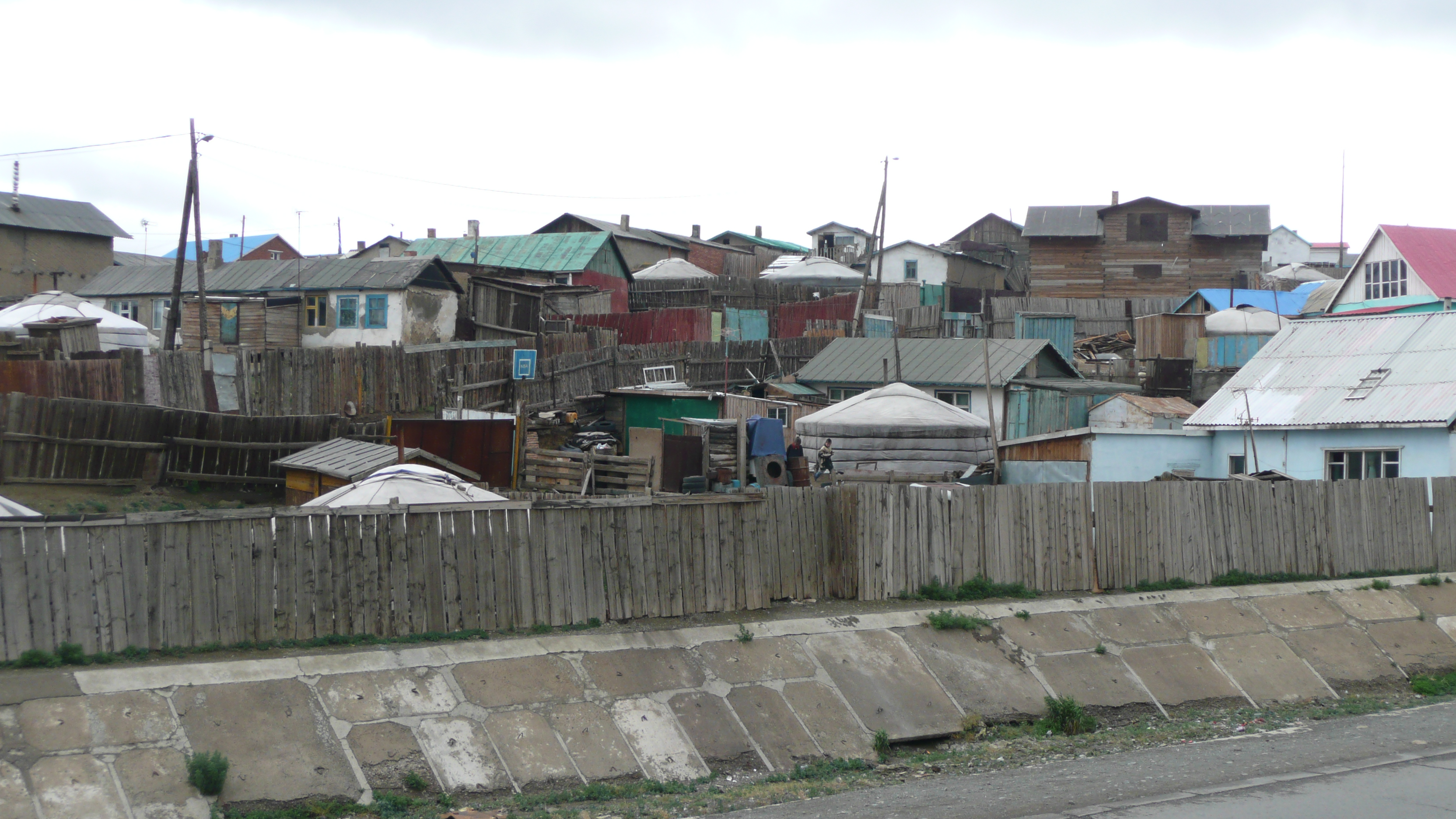

- Flag Coat of arms

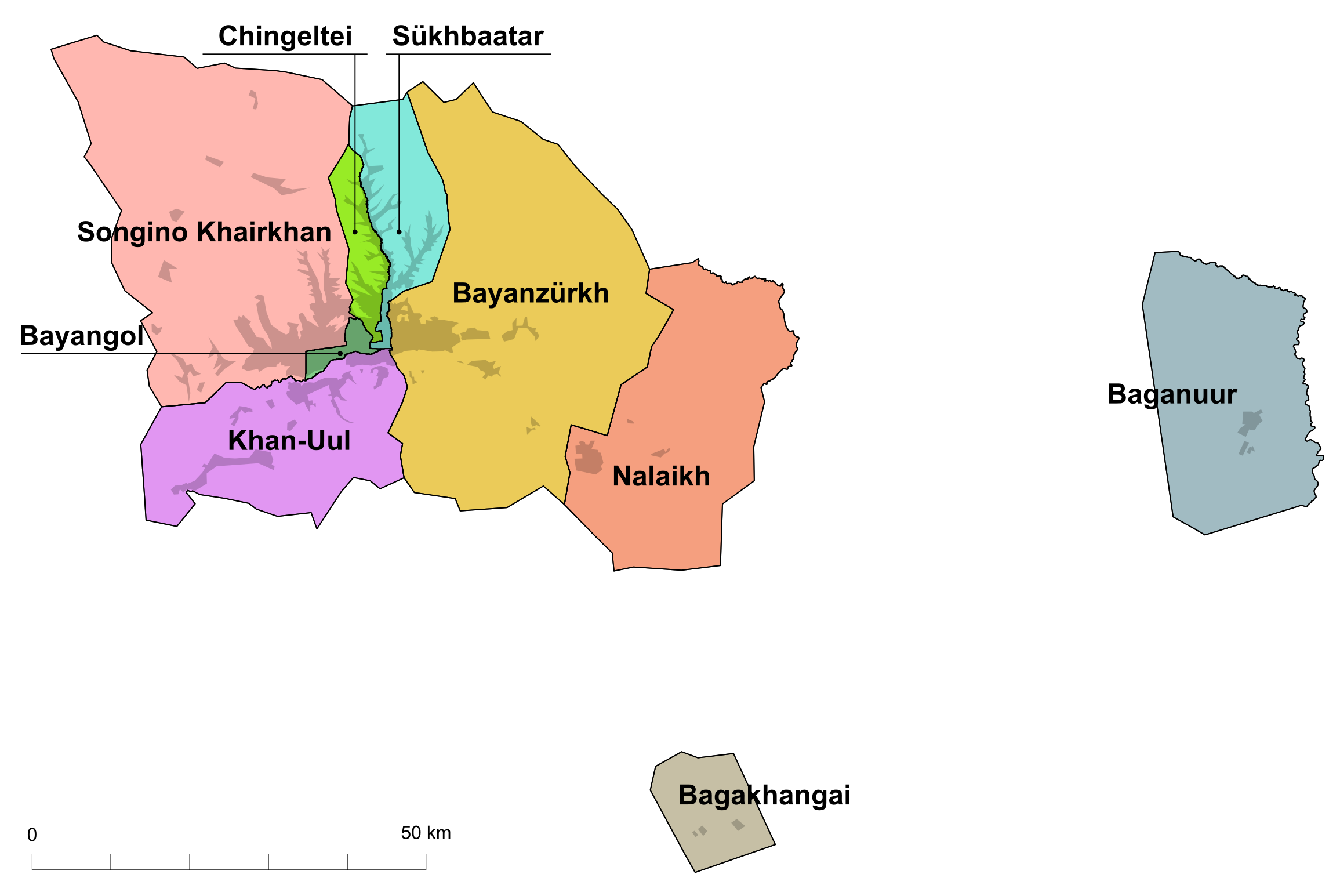
- Bagakhangai District in Ulaanbaatar
- Country: Mongolia
- Municipality: Ulaanbaatar
- Khoroo of Ulaanbaatar: 1989
- Reorganized as district: 1992

Government
  - Body: Citizens' Representatives Khural of the Bagakhangai district
  - Governor of District: A.Sükhbold

Area
  - Total: 140 km^{2} (54 sq mi)
- Elevation: 1,614 m (5,295 ft)

Population (2024)
  - Total: 4,422
- Time zone: UTC+8 (UTC + 8)
- Area code: +976 (0) 22
- Website: Official website

Bagakhangai (Mongolian: Багахангай, small wooded area) is one of nine düüregs (districts) of the Mongolian capital of Ulaanbaatar.

== History ==
Bagakhangai was established as the home of a Soviet military air base. It was then established as a district of Ulaanbaatar in 1989.

== Geography ==
Bagakhangai is an exclave of 140 square kilometres (54 sq mi) southeast of the main part of the capital surrounded by Töv Province. It has a total area of 140 km^{2}.

== Administrative divisions ==
It is subdivided into two khoroos (subdistricts), #1 (Mongolian: Нэгдүгээр) khoroo and #2 (Mongolian: Хоёрдугаар) khoroo. It consists of six khesegs, with each khoroo consists of three khesegs.

== Climate ==
Climate data for Bagakhangai (Maanti), elevation 1,430 m (4,690 ft), (1991–2020 normals, extremes 2002–2023)
Month	Jan	Feb	Mar	Apr	May	Jun	Jul	Aug	Sep	Oct	Nov	Dec	Year
Record high °C (°F)	1.5 (34.7)	8.2 (46.8)	19.3 (66.7)	28.4 (83.1)	34.4 (93.9)	35.9 (96.6)	36.8 (98.2)	36.2 (97.2)	30.1 (86.2)	22.2 (72.0)	12.6 (54.7)	2.3 (36.1)	36.8 (98.2)
Mean daily maximum °C (°F)	−13.7 (7.3)	−9.8 (14.4)	0.5 (32.9)	10.4 (50.7)	17.7 (63.9)	23.4 (74.1)	25.3 (77.5)	23.6 (74.5)	17.8 (64.0)	8.3 (46.9)	−4.7 (23.5)	−12.9 (8.8)	7.2 (44.9)
Daily mean °C (°F)	−22.0 (−7.6)	−18.5 (−1.3)	−8.3 (17.1)	2.1 (35.8)	9.5 (49.1)	16.3 (61.3)	18.6 (65.5)	16.1 (61.0)	9.3 (48.7)	−0.5 (31.1)	−12.6 (9.3)	−20.6 (−5.1)	−0.9 (30.4)
Mean daily minimum °C (°F)	−29.3 (−20.7)	−26.9 (−16.4)	−16.8 (1.8)	−6.4 (20.5)	1.2 (34.2)	8.8 (47.8)	11.7 (53.1)	9.1 (48.4)	1.2 (34.2)	−8.3 (17.1)	−20.0 (−4.0)	−27.3 (−17.1)	−8.6 (16.6)
Record low °C (°F)	−44.5 (−48.1)	−40.4 (−40.7)	−38.2 (−36.8)	−29.7 (−21.5)	−13.4 (7.9)	−5.6 (21.9)	2.6 (36.7)	−4.1 (24.6)	−13.3 (8.1)	−25.4 (−13.7)	−39.1 (−38.4)	−42.7 (−44.9)	−44.5 (−48.1)
Average precipitation mm (inches)	1.2 (0.05)	1.9 (0.07)	3.2 (0.13)	6.2 (0.24)	23.0 (0.91)	42.1 (1.66)	66.4 (2.61)	49.6 (1.95)	17.0 (0.67)	6.3 (0.25)	4.1 (0.16)	1.5 (0.06)	222.5 (8.76)
Average precipitation days (≥ 1.0 mm)	0.4	0.9	1.3	1.5	3.3	6.2	9.4	6.9	4.0	1.6	1.5	0.6	37.6
Source: Starlings Roost Weather

== Transportation ==
The district is connected to the main Ulaanbaatar by 90 km of paved road.
