= Nalaikh Thermal Plant =

Heating plant in Nalaikh, Ulaanbaatar, Mongolia

- Налайхын Дулааны Cтанц ТӨХК
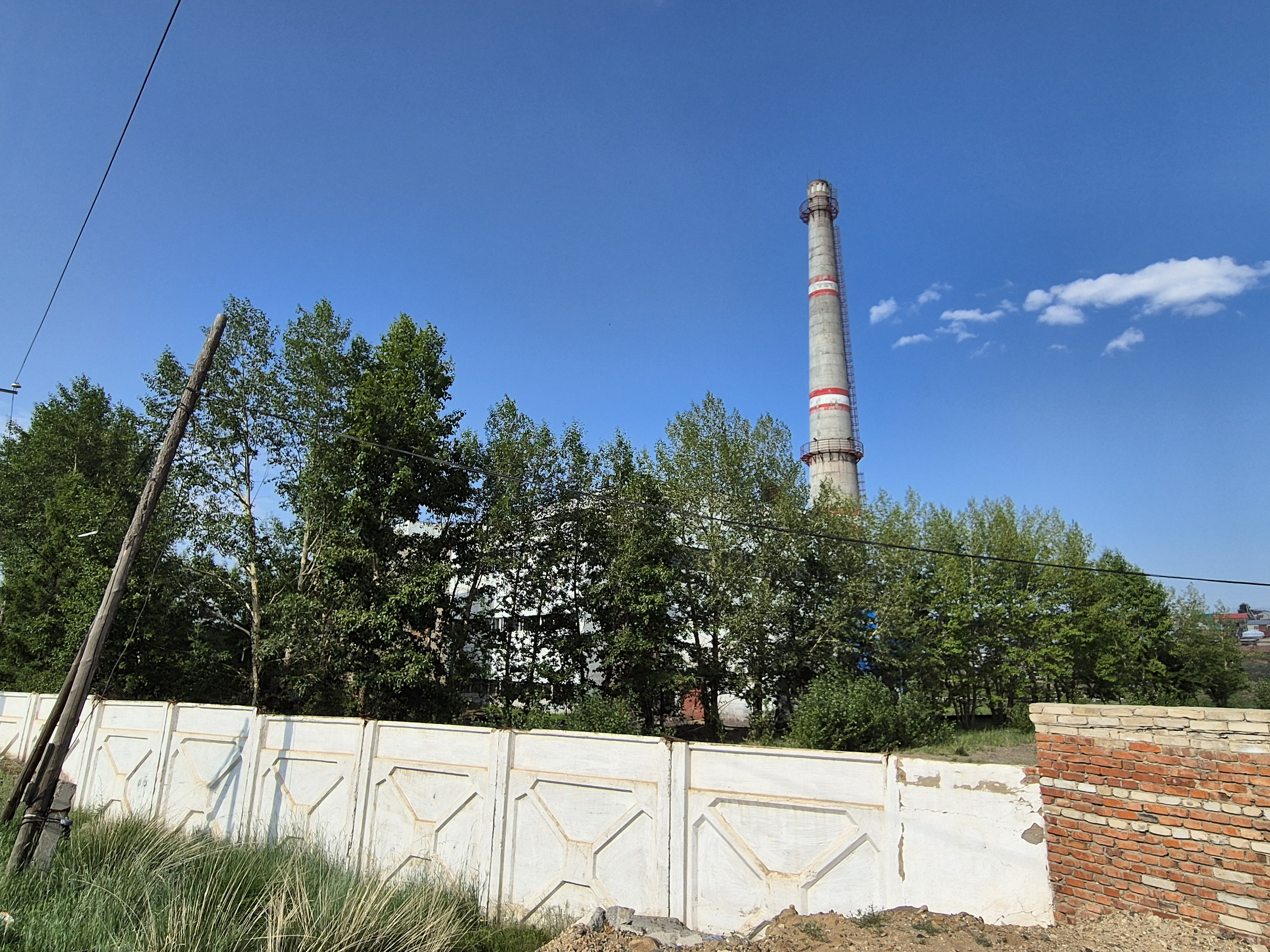
- Interactive map of the Nalaikh Thermal Plant area

General information
- Type: heating plant
- Location: Nalaikh, Ulaanbaatar, Mongolia
- Coordinates: 47°46′13.3″N 107°15′22.4″E
- Opened: 1976

Website
- Official website (in Mongolian)

The Nalaikh Thermal Plant (Mongolian: Налайхын Дулааны Cтанц ТӨХК) is a heating plant in Nalaikh, Ulaanbaatar, Mongolia.

== History ==
The plant was commissioned in 1976.

== Technical specifications ==
The plant has an installed heating generation capacity of 69 MW but with only 39 MW for its actual output. It produces up to 99 TCal of thermal energy annually. It supplies heat to 33 government organizations, 330 entities and 2,840 households, which accounts to 30% of households in Nalaikh.

== Fuel ==
In 2019, it consumed 43.1 thousand tons of coal for its fuel. Its coal fuel is brought from Baganuur Coal Mine in Baganuur.

== Environment ==
Currently, the plant emits 20% of air pollution in Nalaikh. Annually, it produces 40,000 tons of carbon dioxide.

== Finance ==
The plant's annual revenue is ₮4,057 million.

== See also ==
- District heating of Ulaanbaatar
