= District heating of Ulaanbaatar =

Type of heating system in Mongolia

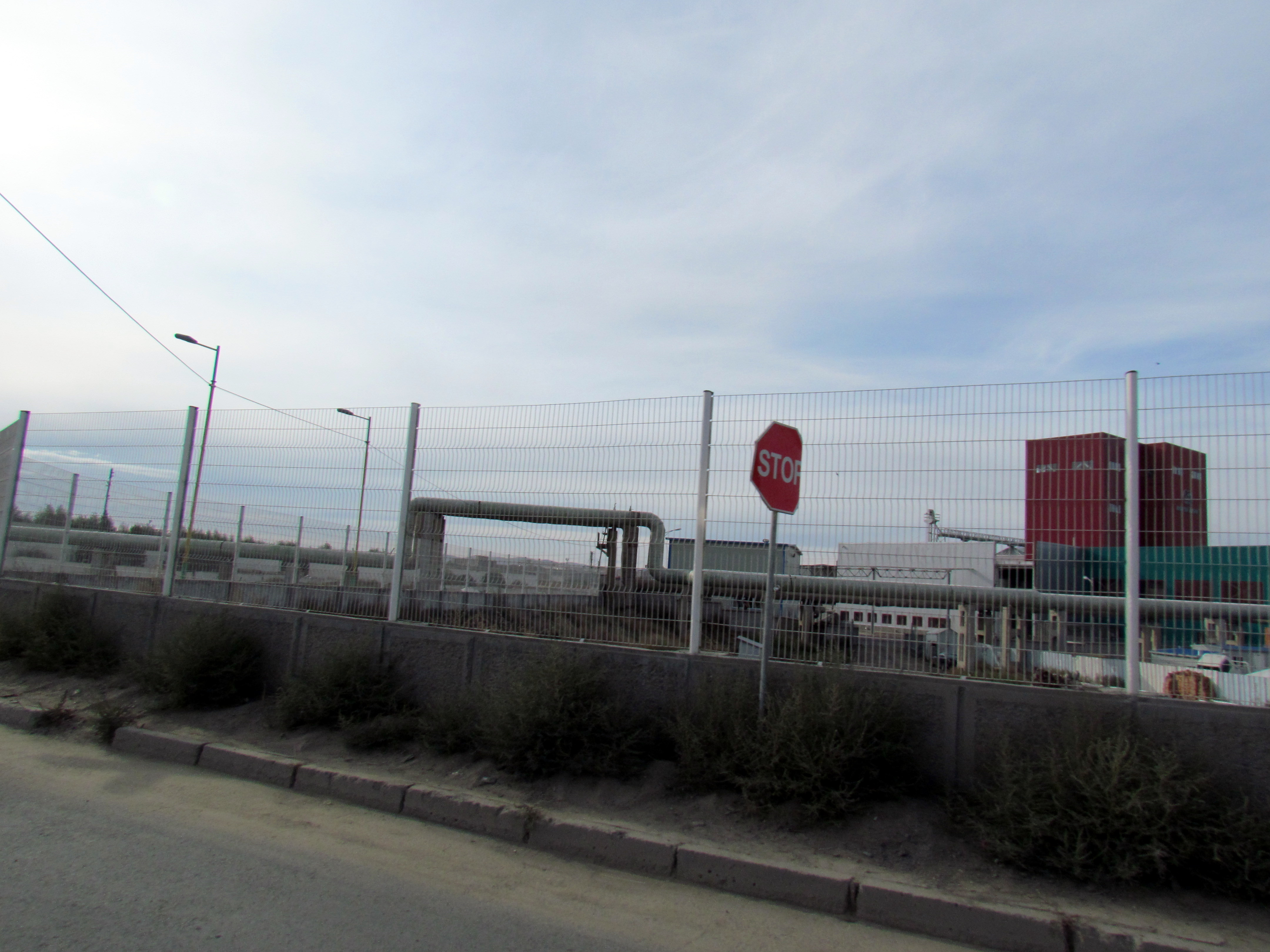
District heating pipeline in Ulaanbaatar

The district heating system of Ulaanbaatar in Mongolia provides the heating to the city of Ulaanbaatar, especially during winter months of the country.

== History ==
A centralized heat supply system was established for Ulaanbaatar on 9 September 1959. On 10 January 2020, a financial agreement was signed between the Government of Mongolia and the European Bank for Reconstruction and Development for a US$10 million soft loan and US$5 million grant to modernize and expand the heating system for the next 5 years. In 2022, a 3.3-km thermal line in Songino Khairkhan was upgraded.

== Infrastructure ==
As of 2023, Ulaanbaatar has a total of 370 km length of thermal lines. In 2023-2024 winter, 3,501 kcal of thermal energy was delivered to the city residence.

The heat supply for the city is provided by the Ulaanbaatar District Heating Company (UBDH) and Housing and Public Utilities of Ulaanbaatar City (OSNAAUG). The heat is supplied by the city's four thermal power plants, which are Amgalan Thermal Power Plant, Thermal Power Plant No. 2, Thermal Power Plant No. 3 and Thermal Power Plant No. 4.

== See also ==
- Energy in Mongolia
