= Khoroo =

Subdivison of districts of Ulaanbaatar, Mongolia

A khoroo (/xɔːˈroʊ/; Mongolian: хороо [χɔˈɾɔ]) is an administrative subdivision of Ulaanbaatar, the capital of Mongolia. The term is often translated as subdistrict or microdistrict, although the latter might lead to confusion with khoroolols. A khoroo is below the level of a düüreg (district). Khoroos are further divided into sectional parts called kheseg.

As of 2020 there is a total of 173 khoroo. Each khoroo has an identifying number within its düüreg.

Each khoroo is headed by a governor.

== List of khoroo ==
Düüreg	Khoroo
Bagakhangai	1, 2
Baganuur	1, 2, 3, 4, 5
Bayangol	1, 2, 3, 4, 5, 6, 7, 8, 9, 10, 11, 12, 13, 14, 15, 16, 17, 18, 19, 20, 21, 22, 23, 24, 25, 26, 27, 28, 29, 30, 31, 32, 33, 34
Bayanzürkh	1, 2, 3, 4, 5, 6, 7, 8, 9, 10, 11, 12, 13, 14, 15, 16, 17, 18, 19, 20, 21, 22, 23, 24, 25, 26, 27, 28, 29, 30, 31, 32, 33, 34, 35, 36, 37, 38, 39, 40, 41, 42, 43
Chingeltei	1, 2, 3, 4, 5, 6, 7, 8, 9, 10, 11, 12, 13, 14, 15, 16, 17, 18, 19, 20, 21, 22, 23, 24
Khan Uul	1, 2, 3, 4, 5, 6, 7, 8, 9, 10, 11, 12, 13, 14, 15, 16, 17, 18, 19, 20, 21
Nalaikh	1, 2, 3, 4, 5, 6, 7, 8
Songino Khairkhan	1, 2, 3, 4, 5, 6, 7, 8, 9, 10, 11, 12, 13, 14, 15, 16, 17, 18, 19, 20, 21, 22, 23, 24, 25, 26, 27, 28, 29, 30, 31, 32, 33, 34, 35, 36, 37, 38, 39, 40, 41, 42, 43
Sükhbaatar	1, 2, 3, 4, 5, 6, 7, 8, 9, 10, 11, 12, 13, 14, 15, 16, 17, 18, 19, 20
Total	173
