= Abu-Bakr Siddiq Central Mosque =

Mosque in Ölgii, Bayan-Ölgii, Mongolia

- Абу-Бакр Сыддык төв сүм
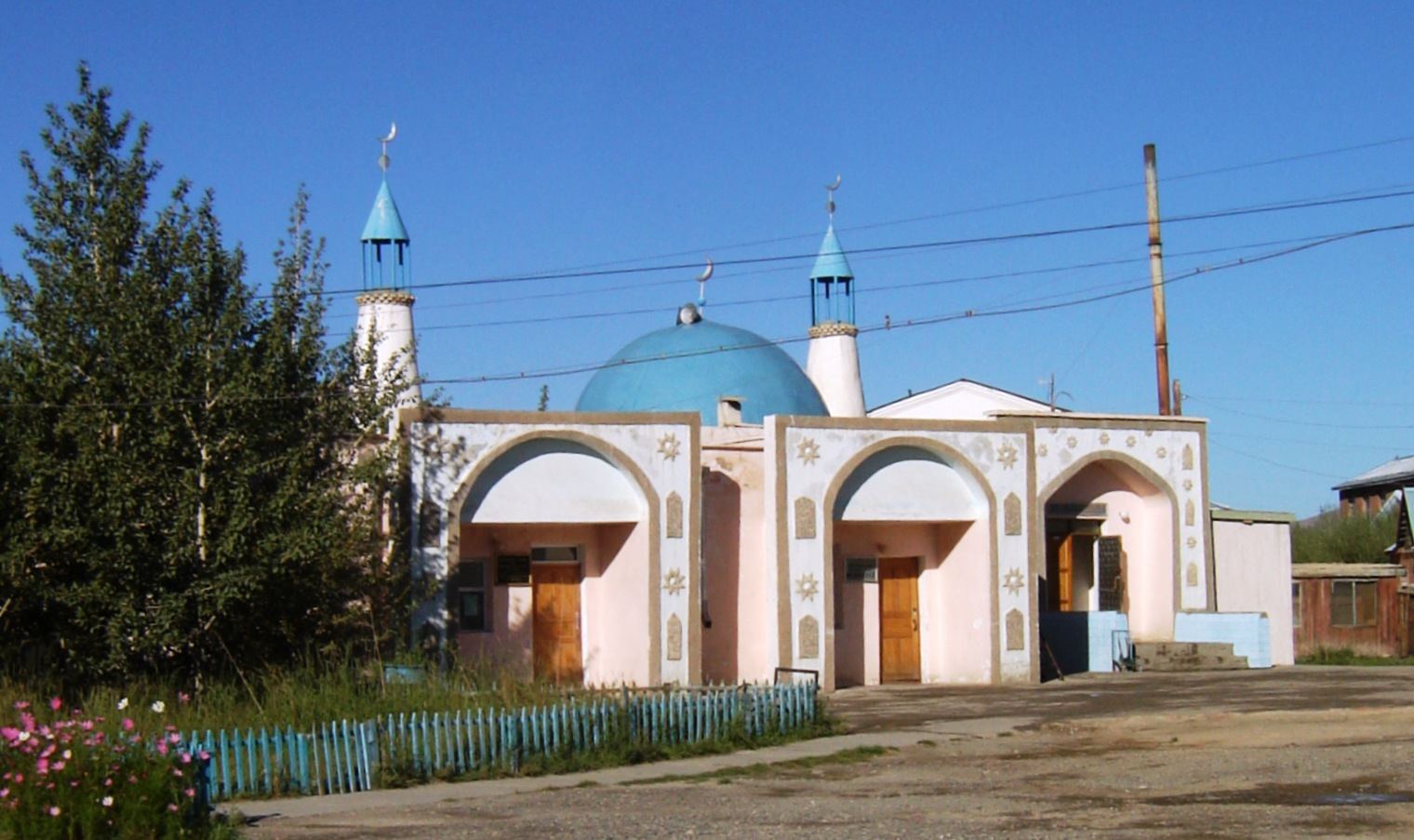

- Location within Mongolia

Religion
- Affiliation: Islam
- District: Khovdgol, Ölgii
- Province: Bayan-Ölgii
- Leadership: Chief Imam: Bakhyt Lenbay
- Status: Active

Location
- Location: Ölgii, Bayan-Ölgii, Mongolia
- Country: Mongolia
- Coordinates: 48°58′13.5″N 89°58′0.6″E

Architecture
- Type: Mosque
- Funded by: United Arab Emirates
- Established: 1992

The Abu-Bakr Siddiq Central Mosque (Mongolian: Абу-Бакр Сыддык төв сүм, Kazakh: Орталық Әбу-Бәкір Сыддық мешіті) is a mosque in Ölgii, Bayan-Ölgii Province, Mongolia.

== History ==
The mosque was the First Mosque in Mongolia constructed in 1992 with funds from the United Arab Emirates.

== Activities ==
The mosque serves as the headquarters of Islamic Centre of Mongolia. It also consists of a madrasa. Eid namaz is also prayed there.

== Gallery ==
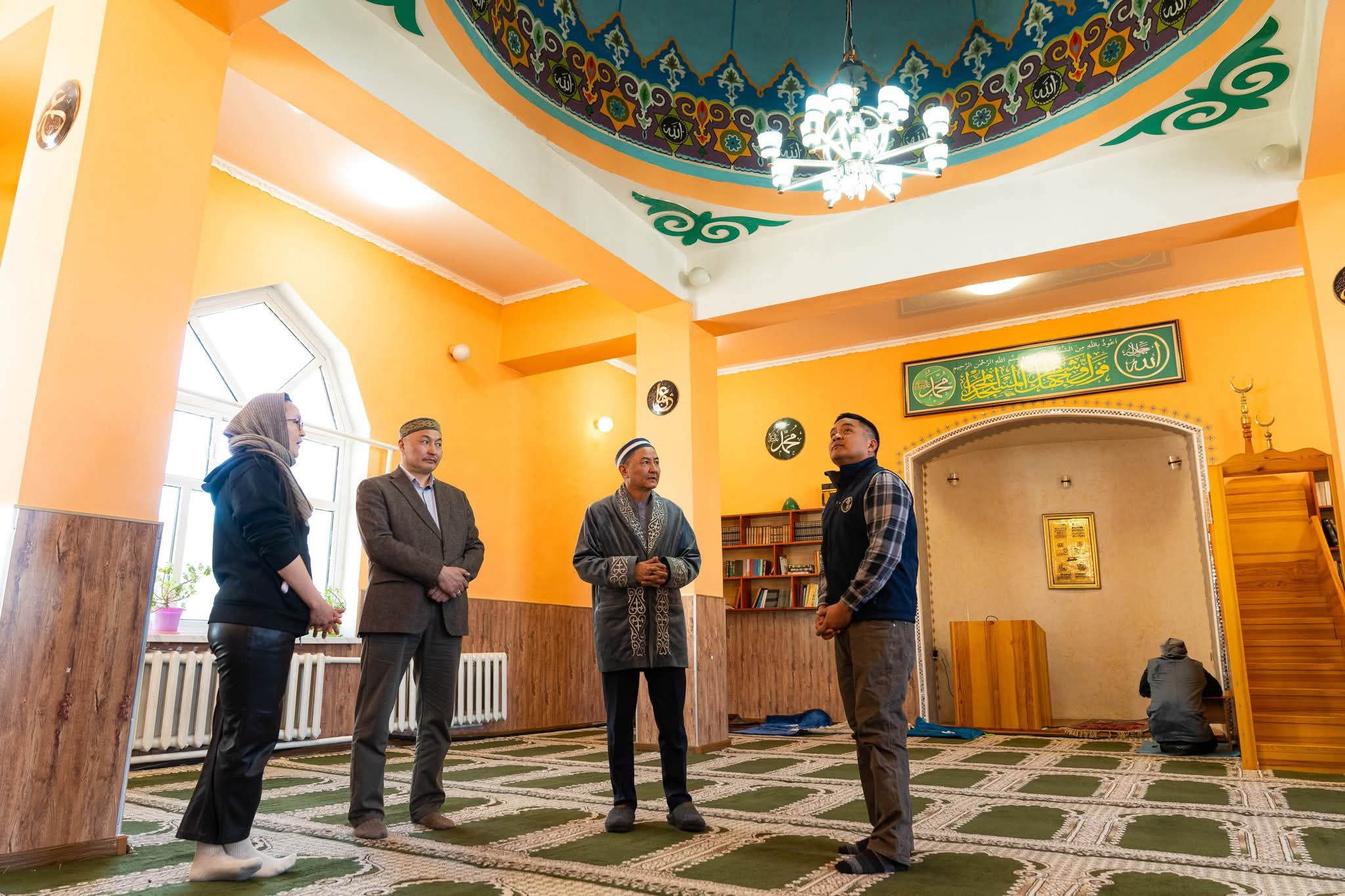
US ambassador visit in March 2025

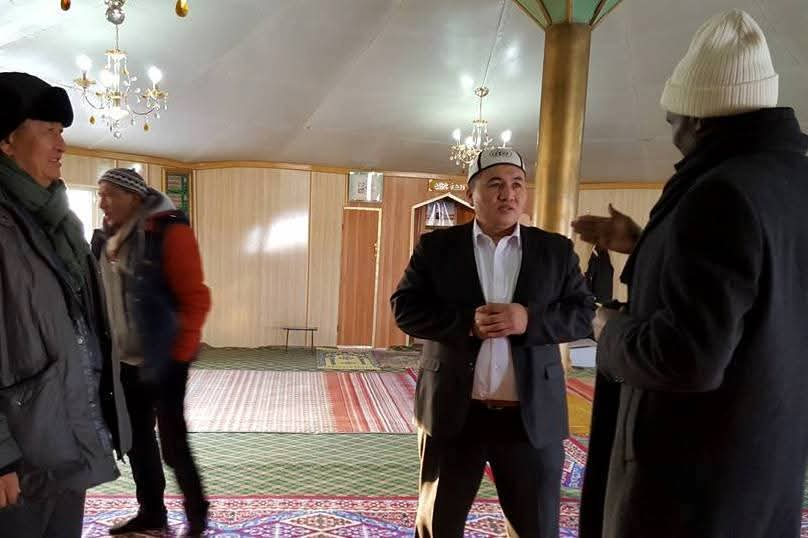

== See also ==
- Islam in Mongolia
- List of mosques in Mongolia
