= Central Library of Bayan-Ölgii Province =

Public library in Ölgii, Bayan-Ölgii, Mongolia

- Баян-Өлгий аймгийн Б.Ахтаны нэрэмжит төв номын сан
- 48.967109°N 89.967440°E
- Location: 113 S. Zukha-1 St., Burged, Ölgii, Bayan-Ölgii, Mongolia, 830171
- Type: public library
- Established: 1 April 1945; 81 years ago
- Service area: Bayan-Ölgii

Collection
- Size: 22,713 books

Access and use
- Members: 28 thousand/year

Other information
- Director: Dalyel Altyngül (since 2018)

The Central Library of Bayan-Ölgii Province (Mongolian: Баян-Өлгий аймгийн Б.Ахтаны нэрэмжит төв номын сан) is a public library in Ölgii, Bayan-Ölgii Province, Mongolia.

== History ==
The library was established on 1 April 1945, and on 1 August 1949, it became the Unified Library of Bayan-Ölgii Province. In 2019, Kazakhstan opened the Literature and Culture Center of the Republic of Kazakhstan at the library. Around 1,000 books of various topics were also donated to the library. In 2022, the Embassy of Australia donated various Mongolian and English books to the library.

== See also ==
- Kazakhstan–Mongolia relations
- National Library of Mongolia
