= Thermal Power Plant No. 4 (Ulaanbaatar) =

Coal-fired power plant in Bayangol, Ulaanbaatar, Mongolia

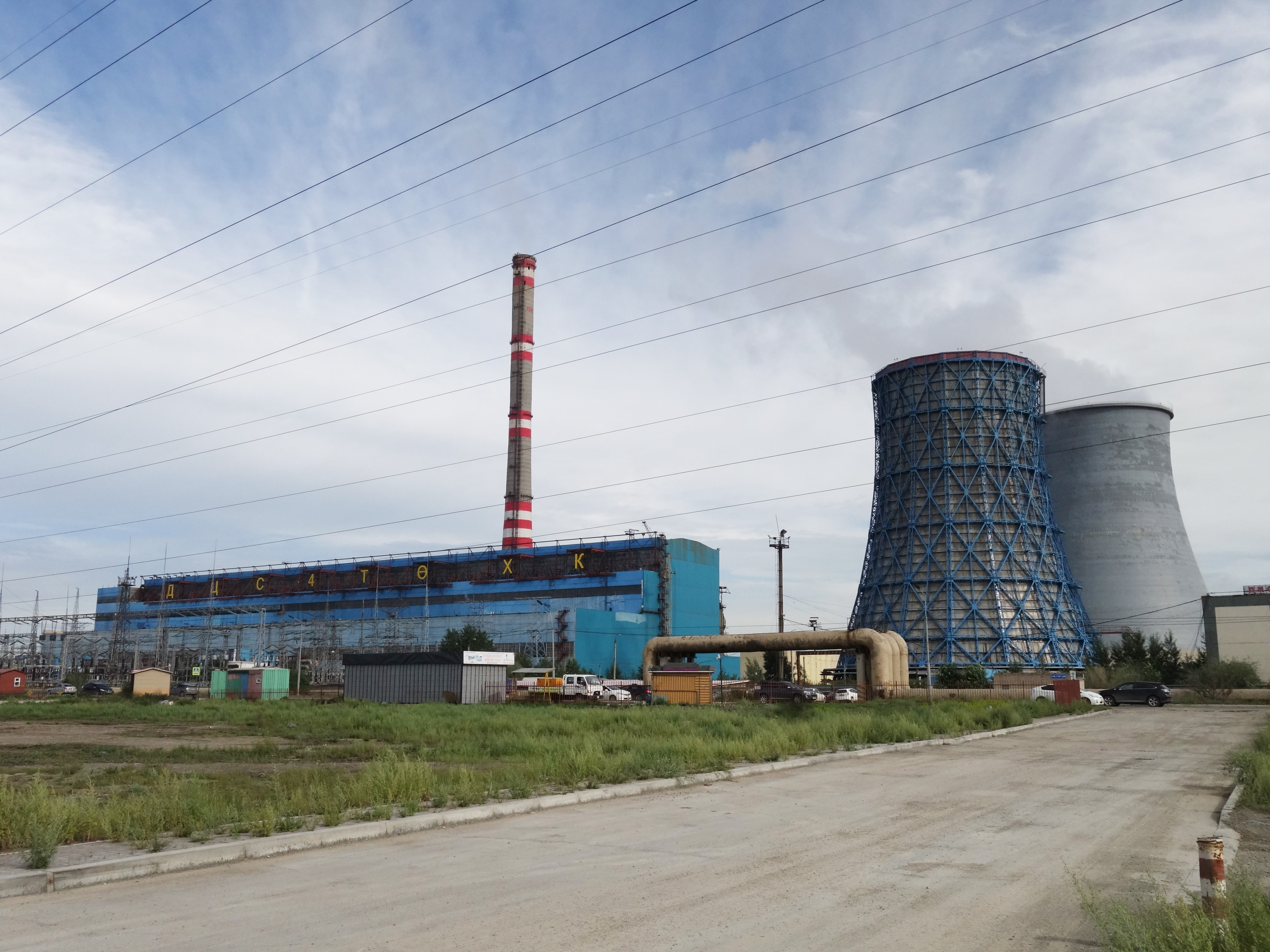
- Official name: Улаанбаатарын ДЦС-4
- Country: Mongolia
- Location: Bayangol, Ulaanbaatar
- Coordinates: 47°53′38.7″N 106°48′13.4″E
- Status: Operational
- Commission date: January 1983
- Employees: 1,400

Thermal power station
- Primary fuel: Brown coal
- Secondary fuel: Heavy fuel oil
- Turbine technology: Steam turbine
- Annual revenue: ₮124,168 million (2011)
- Cogeneration?: yes

Power generation
- Units operational: 3 X 80 MW; 3 X 100 MW
- Nameplate capacity: 663 MW
- Annual net output: 2,691 GWh

External links
- Commons: Related media on Commons

The Thermal Power Plant No. 4 (Mongolian: Улаанбаатарын ДЦС-4) is a coal-fired cogeneration power station in Bayangol, Ulaanbaatar, Mongolia. With a total installed generation capacity of 663 MW, it is currently Mongolia's largest power station.

== History ==
The first generating unit of the power station was commissioned in January 1983. All of the six generating units of the power plant were completed in 1991. In late 1990s, the power station began its overhaul project which were divided into two phases. The first phase which started in 1998 and completed in 2001, saw the revamping of its boiler no. 1 until boiler no. 4. The second phase which started in 2001 and completed in 2007, saw the revamping of its boiler no. 5 until boiler no. 8.

On 8 February 2017, the power station also received two emission analyzers from the Japan International Cooperation Agency to measure smoke and pollutants with a total cost of JPY37.6 million. On 13 September 2017, a fire broke out at one of the plant's transformer. The fire was quickly extinguished by 50 firefighters from five units.

== Technical specifications ==
The primary fuel for the power station is brown coal. It can also run on heavy fuel oil if there is a shortage on brown coal availability. It consists of eight boilers and six generating units, three 80 MW units and three 100 MW units, making it the largest power station in the country. In 2023, the power station used a total of 19.2 million m^{3} of water to generate power. In 2011, the power plant generated 2,691 GWh of electricity. The plant supplies electricity to 58% loads of Ulaanbaatar.

It also acts as a district heating for Ulaanbaatar. It has a heat supply capacity of 6,820 GJ/h and annual heat generation of 16,871 TJ in 2020.

== Management ==
In 2010, the power plant employs around 1,400 personnel for its operations, maintenance and other works.

== Finance ==
In 2011, the power plant received a revenue of ₮124,168 million from its electricity and heat selling.

== See also ==
- List of power stations in Mongolia
