= Museum of Bayan-Ölgii Province =

Museum in Ölgii, Bayan-Ölgii, Mongolia

- Баян-Өлгий аймгийн музей
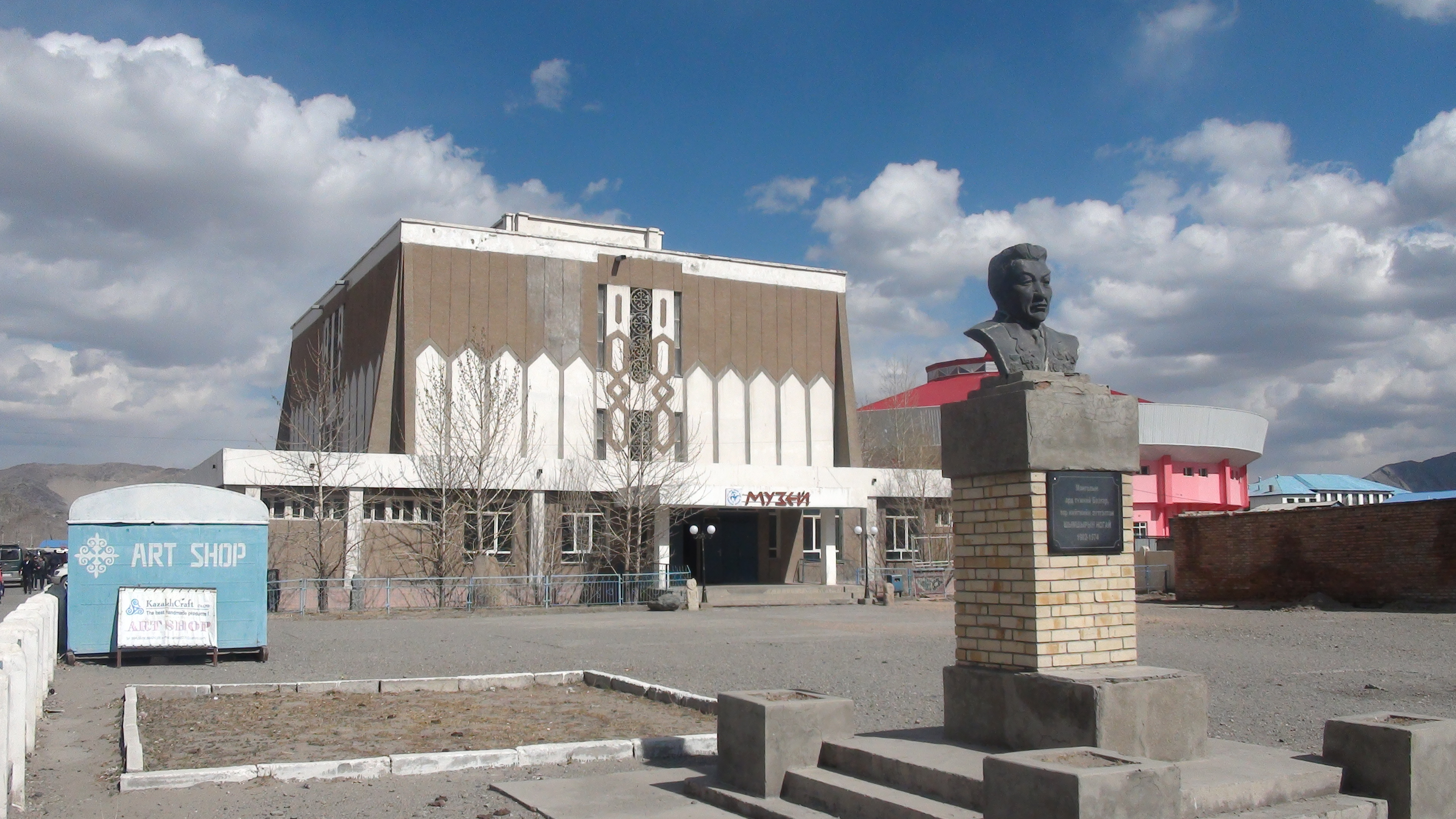
- Former name: Local Studies Cabinet (1948‐1961); Local Studies Museum (from 1961)
- Established: February 15, 1948; 78 years ago
- Location: 201 Sh. Nogai St., Bürged, Ölgii, Bayan-Ölgii, Mongolia
- Coordinates: 48°58′10.3″N 89°58′13.3″E
- Type: Museum
- Collection size: 5,400
- Visitors: 1,500/yr
- Director: Aishagül Azamat (since 2012)

The Museum of Bayan-Ölgii Province (Mongolian: Баян-Өлгий аймгийн музей) is a museum in Ölgii, Bayan-Ölgii Province, Mongolia.

== History ==
The museum was first opened on February 15, 1948 as the Local Studies Cabinet in a classroom at the 1st School of Ölgii. In 1950, the cabinet was relocated to a room in an abandoned mosque building. Later, in 1961, the Local Studies Cabinet was upgraded to the Local Studies Museum of Bayan-Ölgii Province.

== Architecture ==
The museum's current building was built in 1987 by construction crew of Ü. Muratkhan. After 1 year in 1988, building was first opened as 3 floor building same as now.

== Exhibitions ==
The ground floor displays various stuffed wild animals. The upper floor displays information regarding the local history. The top most floor displays the culture and life of the local tribes.

== See also ==
- List of museums in Mongolia
