= Districts of Ulaanbaatar =

Administrative division of Ulaanbaatar, Mongolia

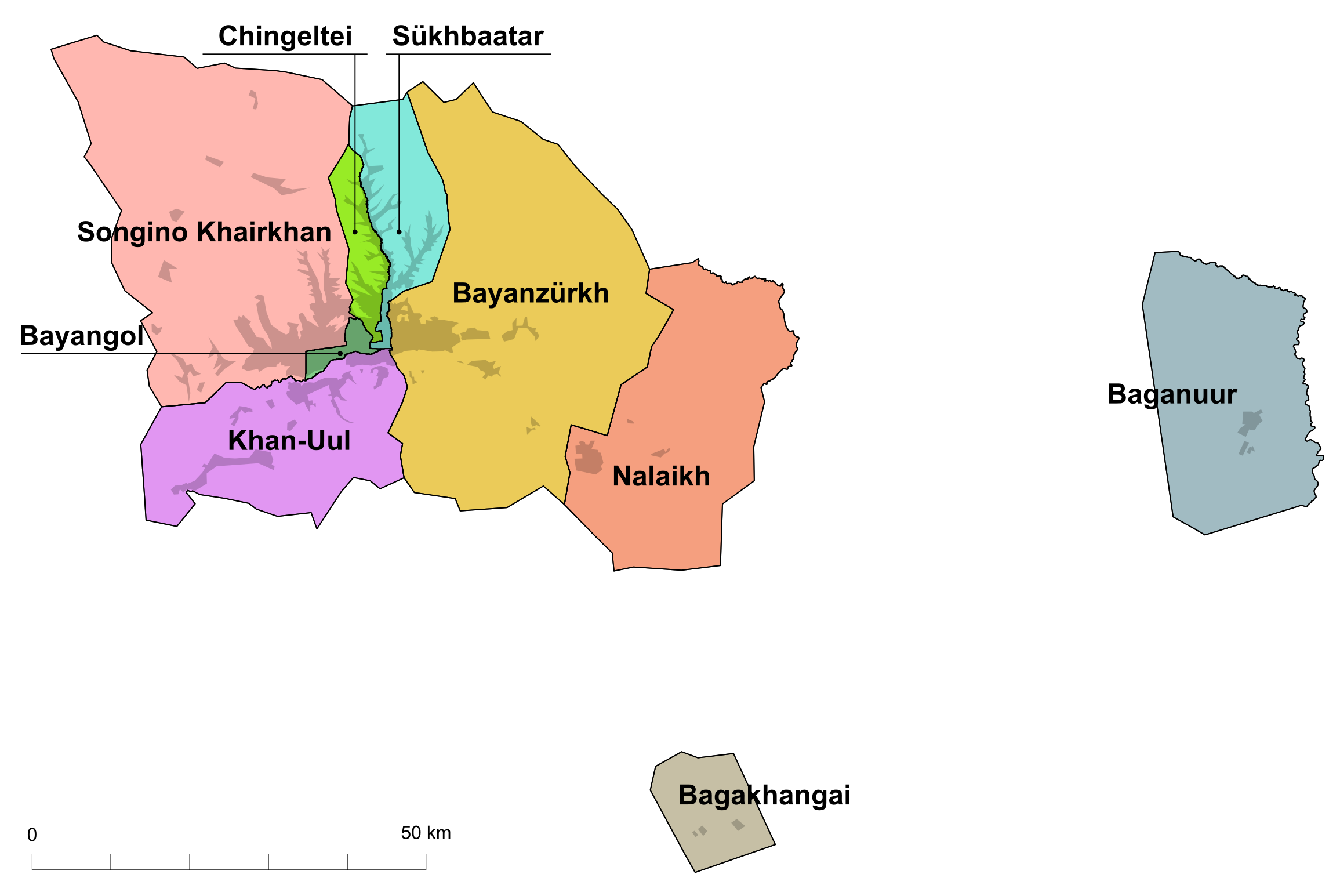
Map of the districts of Ulaanbaatar

Ulaanbaatar is divided into nine düüregs (Note: Mongolian: дүүрэг [túːrɘk] (pl дүүргүүд [túːrkuˑt])) or municipal districts: Baganuur, Bagakhangai, Bayangol, Bayanzürkh, Chingeltei, Khan Uul, Nalaikh, Songino Khairkhan and Sükhbaatar. Each district is subdivided into khoroos, of which there are 204. Each düüreg also serves as a constituency that elects one or more representatives into the State Great Khural, the national parliament.

== History ==
Ulaanbaatar was divided into administrative divisions for the first time in 1924. After the adoption of the third constitution in 1960, Ulaanbaatar consisted of four districts on 6 July 1960. In 1990, the city was reorganized to have six districts. On 13 January 1992, the city was reorganized again and expanded into nine districts as of today.

== List by population and area ==
2020 population estimate from Ulaanbaatar city Agency for Statistics.

| Flag | Name | Mongolian | Khoroos | Population | Area | Population density |
|---|---|---|---|---|---|---|
| | Bagakhangai | Багахангай | 2 | 4,463 | 140.0 km^{2} | 31.9/km^{2} |
| | Baganuur | Багануур | 5 | 29,342 | 620.2 km^{2} | 47.3/km^{2} |
| | Bayangol | Баянгол | 34 | 231,517 | 29.5 km^{2} | 7848.0/km^{2} |
| | Bayanzürkh | Баянзүрх | 43 | 367,679 | 1244.1 km^{2} | 295.5/km^{2} |
| | Chingeltei | Чингэлтэй | 24 | 151,203 | 89.3 km^{2} | 1293.2/km^{2} |
| | Khan Uul | Хан Уул | 25 | 195,927 | 484.7 km^{2} | 404.2/km^{2} |
| | Nalaikh | Налайх | 8 | 38,690 | 687.6 km^{2} | 56.3/km^{2} |
| | Songino Khairkhan | Сонгинохайрхан | 43 | 335,703 | 1200.6 km^{2} | 279.6/km^{2} |
| | Sükhbaatar | Сүхбаатар | 20 | 144,616 | 208.4 km^{2} | 693.9/km^{2} |
| Ulaanbaatar | | | 204 | 1,499,140 | 4704.4 km^{2} | 318.7/km^{2} |

Although administratively part of Ulaanbaatar, Nalaikh and Baganuur are separate cities. Bagakhangai and Baganuur are noncontiguous exclaves, the former located within the Töv Province, the latter on the border between the Töv and Khentii provinces.
