= Thermal Power Plant No. 2 (Ulaanbaatar) =

Coal-fired power plant in Bayangol, Ulaanbaatar, Mongolia

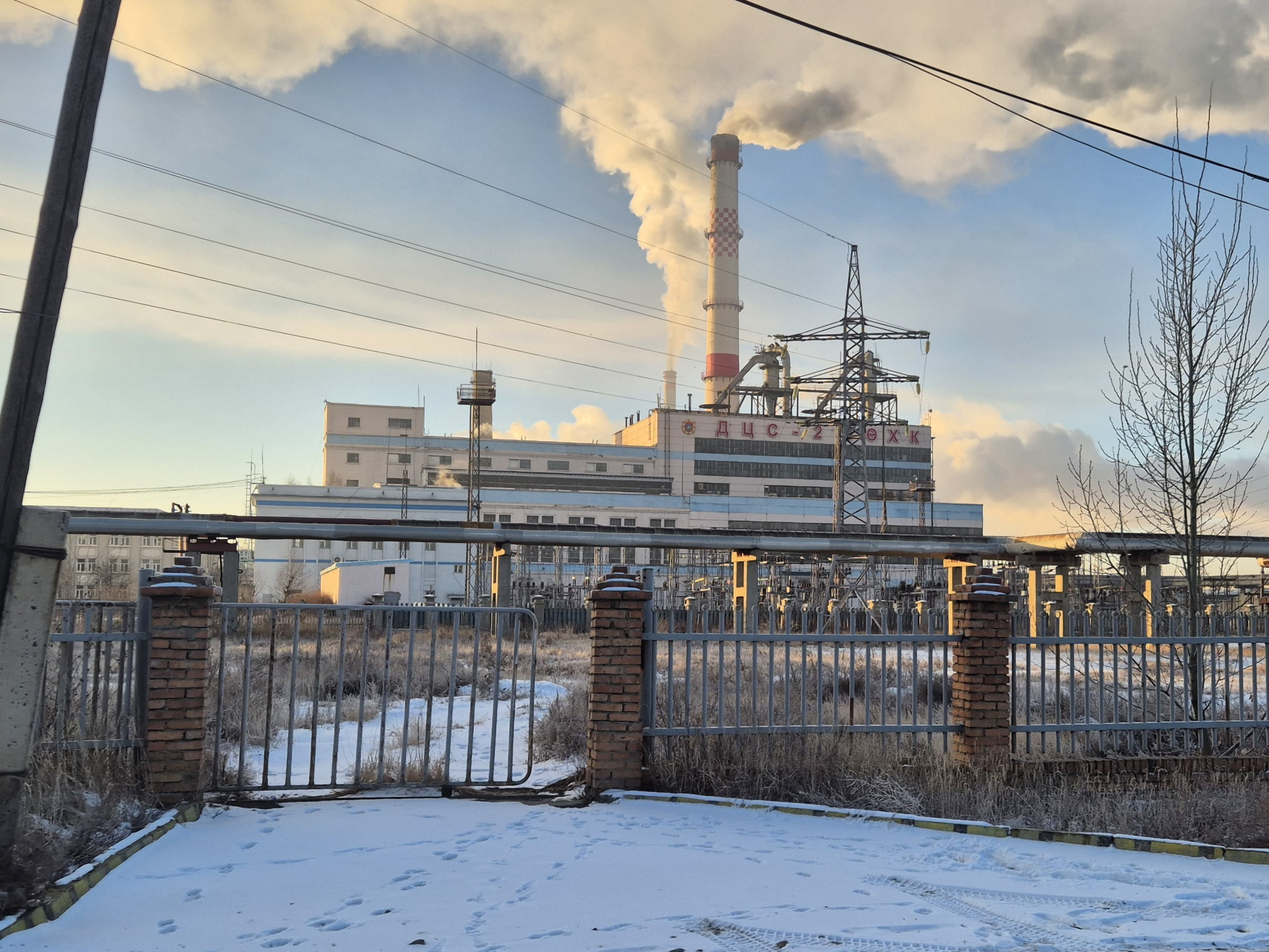
- Official name: Улаанбаатарын ДЦС-2
- Country: Mongolia
- Location: Bayangol, Ulaanbaatar
- Coordinates: 47°54′18.3″N 106°48′26.5″E
- Status: Operational
- Commission date: 1961

Thermal power station
- Primary fuel: Coal
- Turbine technology: Steam turbine
- Cogeneration?: yes

Power generation
- Nameplate capacity: 21.5 MW

External links
- Website: Official website (in Mongolian)

The Thermal Power Plant No. 2 (Mongolian: Улаанбаатарын ДЦС-2) is a coal-fired cogeneration power station in Bayangol, Ulaanbaatar, Mongolia.

== History ==
The power plant was commissioned in 1961.

== Technical specifications ==
The power plant has an installed generation capacity of 21.5 MW. It also acts as a district heating for Ulaanbaatar. It has a heat supply capacity of 272 GJ/h and annual heat generation of 1,026 TJ in 2020.

== Finance ==
The production cost of electricity of the power plant is ₮22.98 per kWh and the wholesale price is ₮28.40 per kWh. The production cost of heat of the power plant is ₮5,936.7 per Gcal and the wholesale price is ₮2,603.6 per Gcal.

== See also ==
- List of power stations in Mongolia
