= Nalaikh Mosque =

Mosque in Nalaikh, Ulaanbaatar, Mongolia

- Налайх мечеть
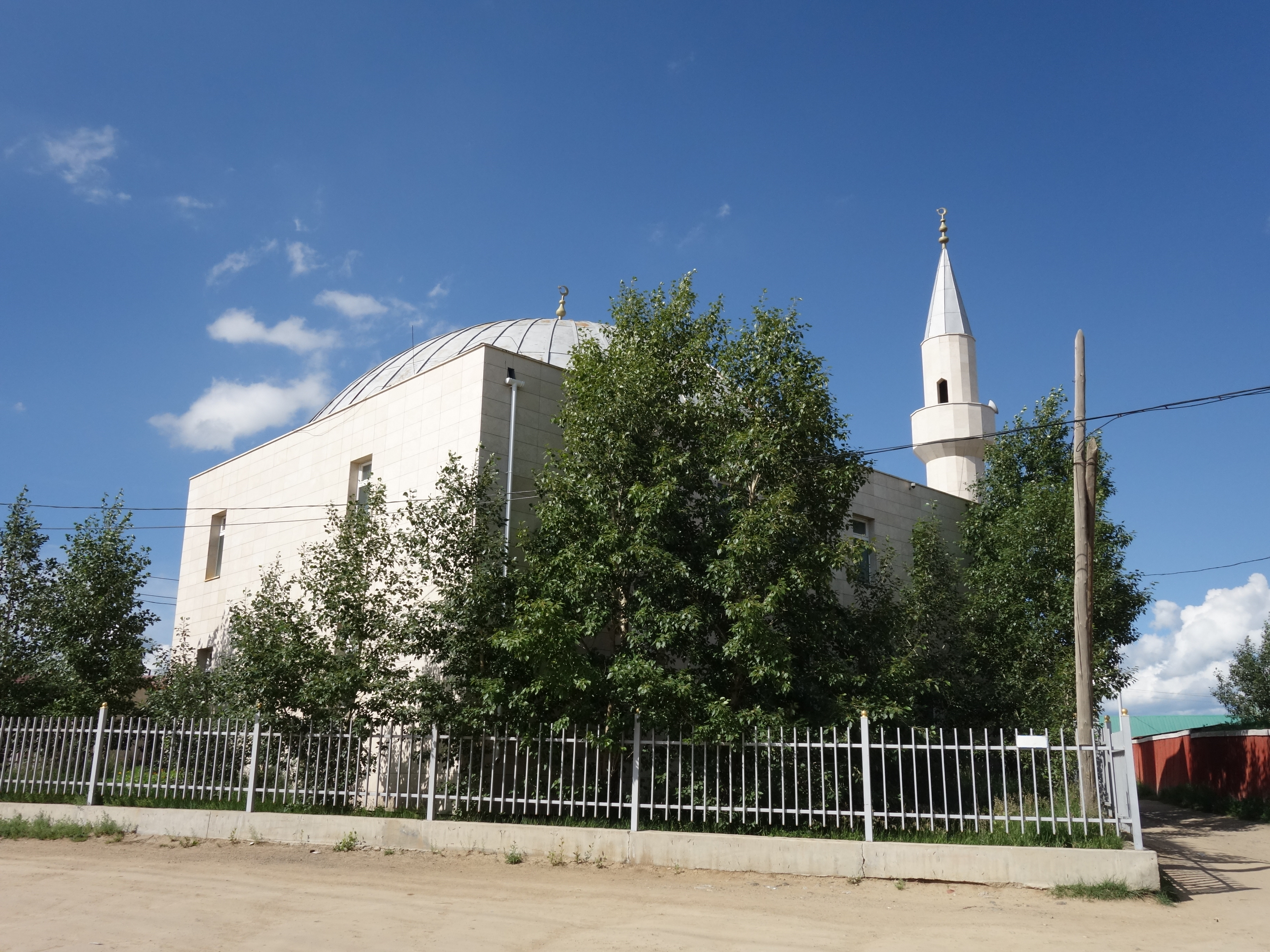

- Location within Mongolia

Religion
- Affiliation: Islam
- Branch/tradition: Sunni

Location
- Location: Nalaikh, Ulaanbaatar, Mongolia
- Interactive map of Nalaikh Mosque
- Coordinates: 47°46′3.0″N 107°16′3.5″E

Architecture
- Type: Mosque
- Funded by: Turkey
- Established: 12 April 2013

The Nalaikh Mosque (Mongolian: Налайх мечеть) or Konya Culture Center and Mosque is a mosque in Nalaikh, Ulaanbaatar, Mongolia. It also known as Khalifa Osman Mosque.

== History ==
The mosque was opened on 12 April 2013 in a ceremony attended by Turkish Prime Minister Recep Tayyip Erdoğan. The construction was funded by Turkish Cooperation and Coordination Agency and Dosteli Foundation.

== Architecture ==
The mosque is a two-story building. The ground floor houses a cultural center and the office of the Mongolian Muslim Association (Mongolian: Монголын Мусульманы Нийгэмлэгүүдийн Холбоо) and the upper floor houses the prayer hall. It is used to cater to the local Kazakhs Sunni Islam community.

== Gallery ==
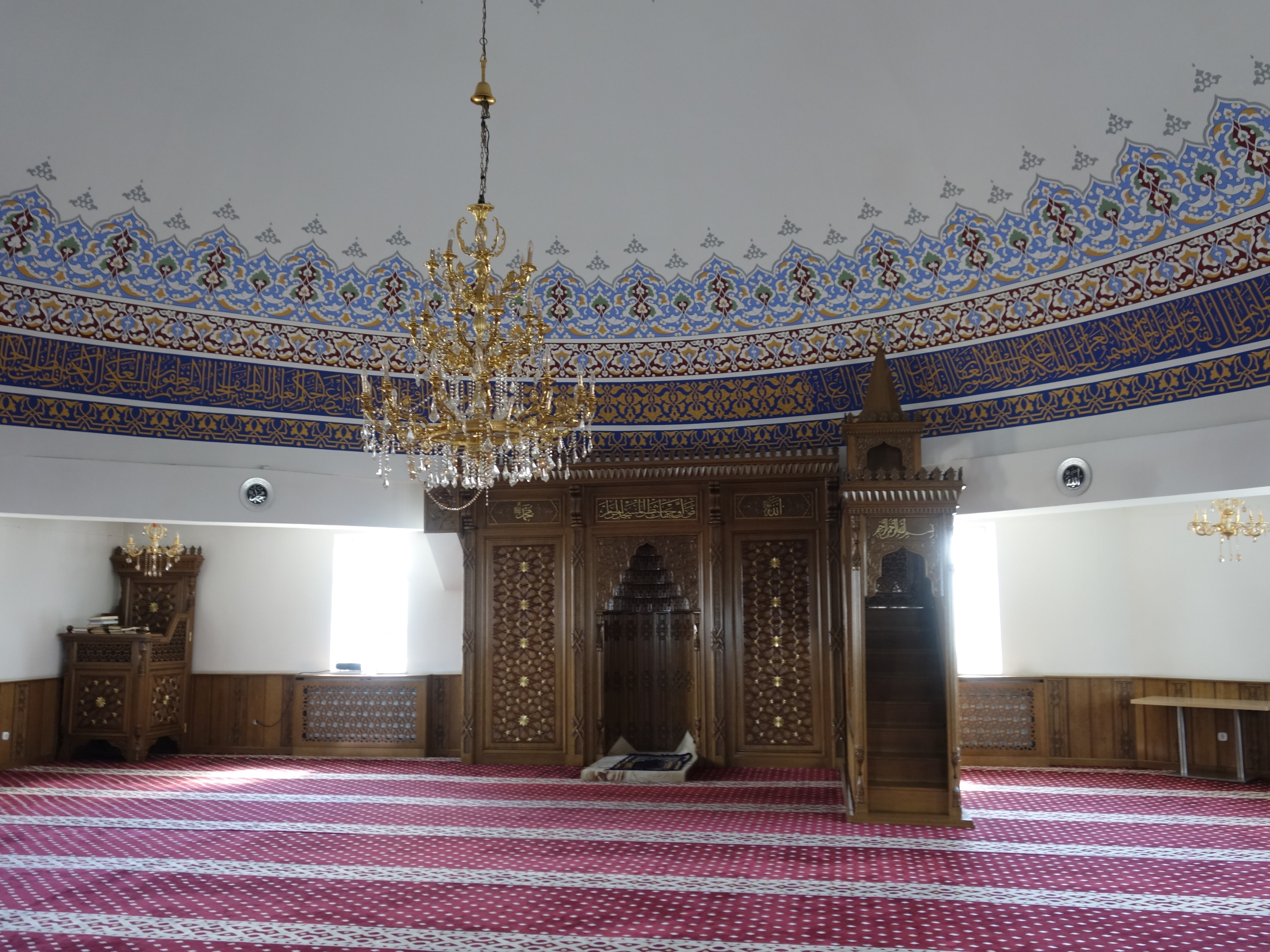
Inner Prayer Hall

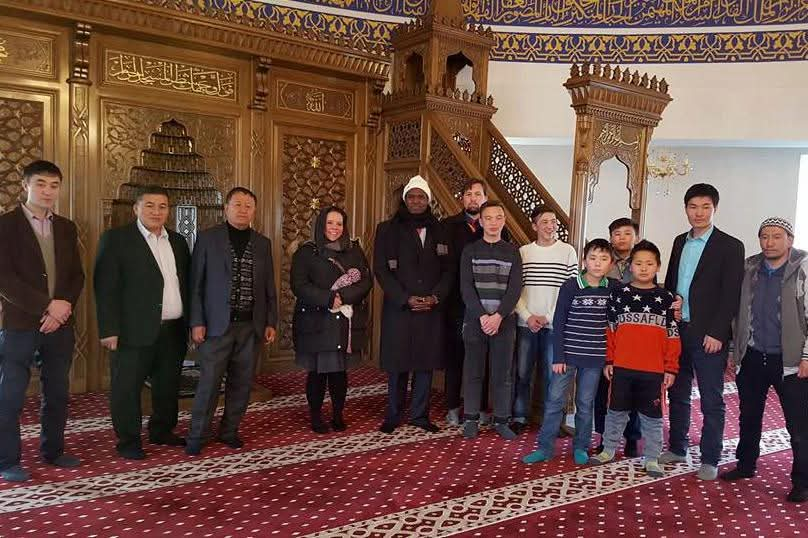
The U.S. Embassy delegation and Dr. Elsanousi touring the main mosque in Nalaikh 2016

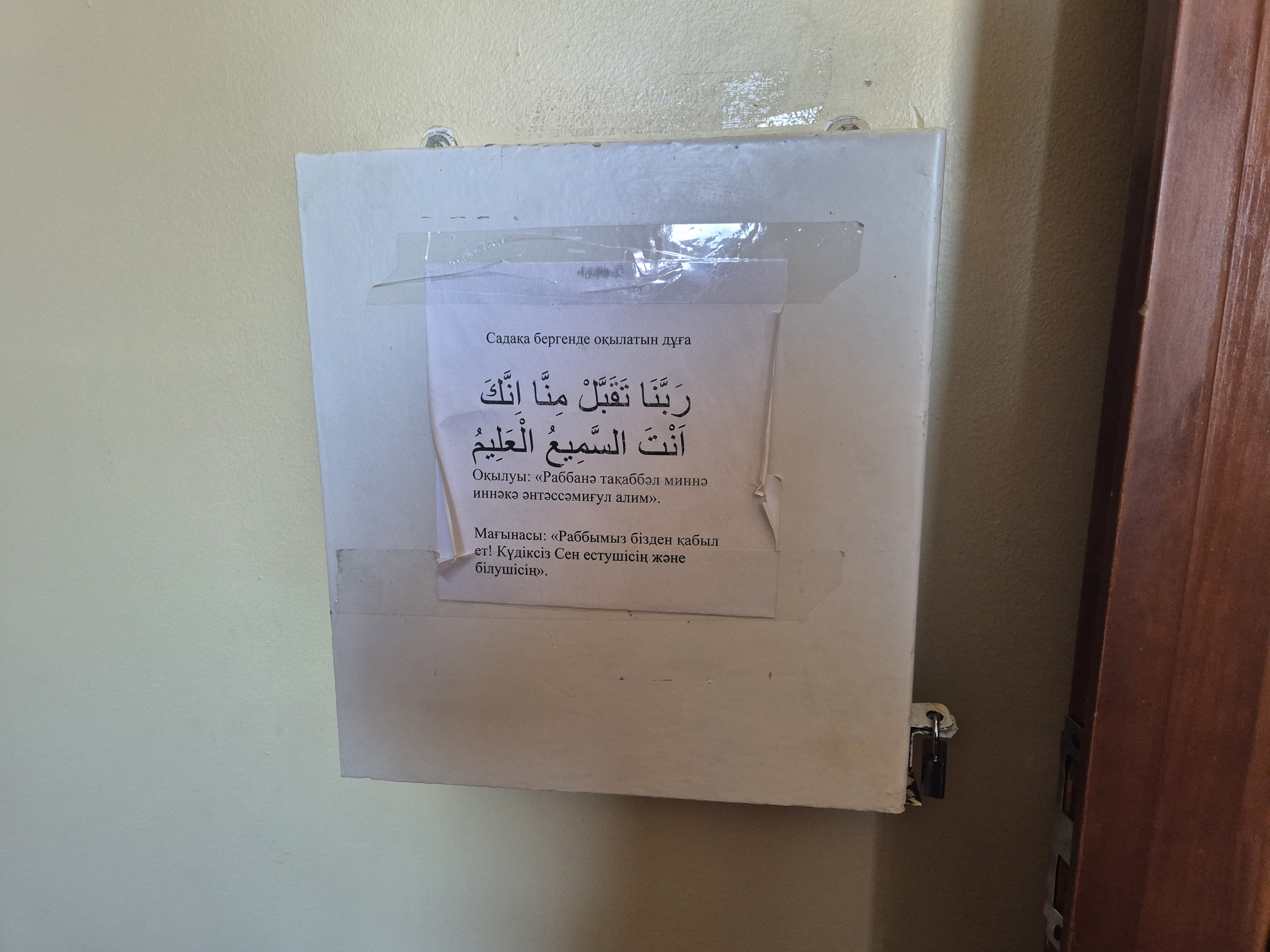
Donation Box

== See also ==
- Islam in Mongolia
- List of mosques in Mongolia
