= Khuzkyein Darmyen =

Mongolian engineer and politician

- Дәрмен Хузкейұлы

Personal details
- Born: 1964 (age 61–62) Bayan-Ölgii, Mongolia
- Citizenship: Mongolia
- Party: Democratic Party
- Education: 1987 — Electrical engineering, Mongolian University of Science and Technology (BS); 1992 — Mongolian University of Science and Technology (MD); 2019 — Consulting Engineer, Mongolian University of Science and Technology
- Occupation: Engineer

Khuzkyein Darmyen (Note: Mongolian: Хузкейн Дармен, Kazakh: Дәрмен Хузкейұлы) (born 1964) is an engineer and Democratic Party politician in Mongolia. A graduate of Zaisanov Secondary School and the Polytechnic Institute in Ulaanbaatar in electrical engineering in 1987, he began his career as an engineer working at Erdenet Thermal Power Station, before being elected governor of the Bayan-Ölgii Province three times.
