= Nalaikh =

District in Ulaanbaatar, Mongolia

Nalaikh District Налайх дүүрэг ᠨᠠᠯᠠᠶᠢᠬᠤᠲᠡᠭᠦᠷᠭᠡ
- Municipal District
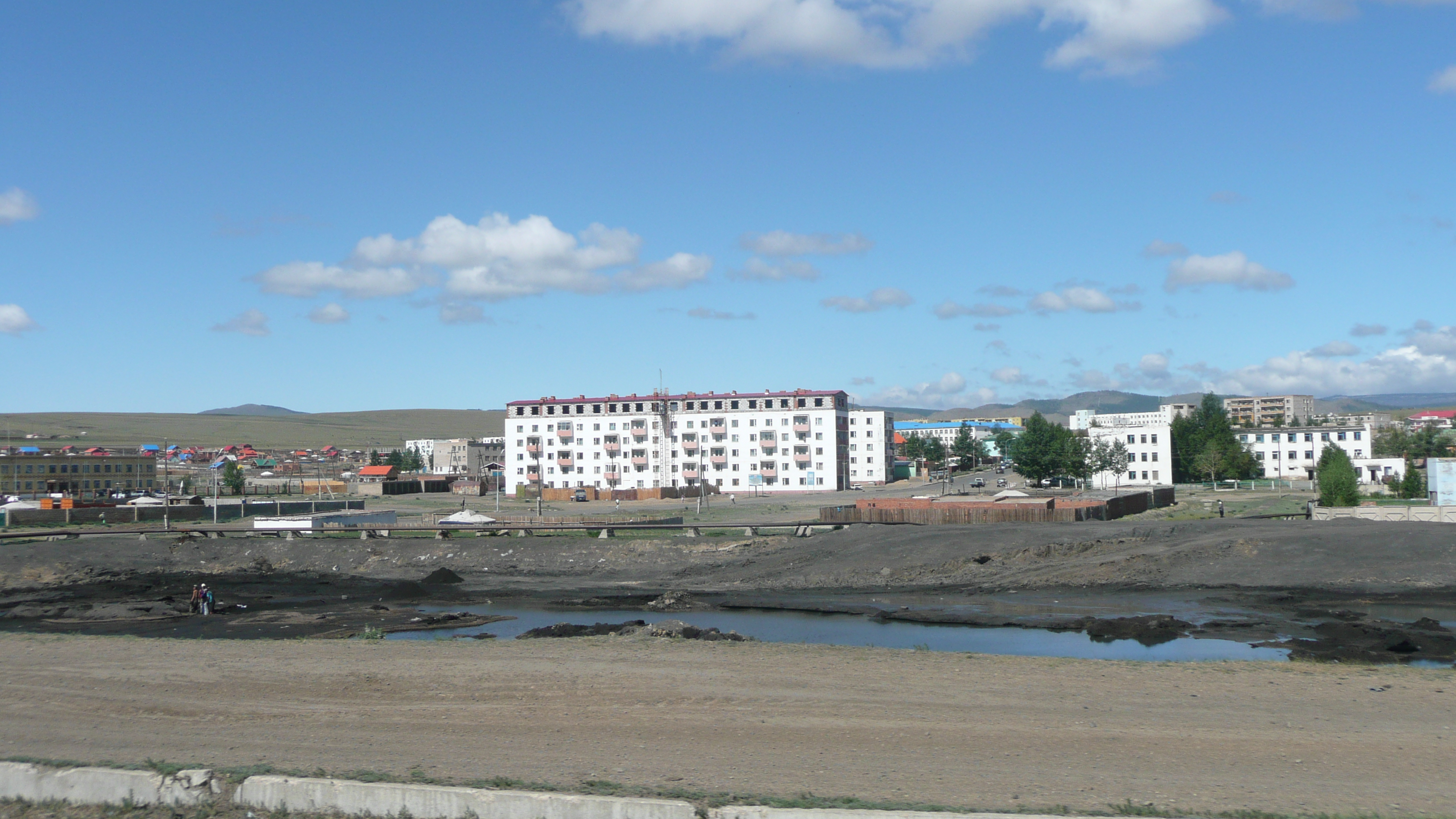

- Flag Coat of arms
- Interactive map of Nalaikh District
- Coordinates: 47°46′21″N 107°15′13″E
- Country: Mongolia
- Municipality: Ulaanbaatar
- Settlement founded: 1922
- City status: 1962
- Raion status: 1965
- Reorganized as district: 1992

Government
  - Body: Citizens' Representatives Khural of the Ulaanbaatar city
  - Governor of District: D.Nayanbayar

Area
  - Total: 687.6 km^{2} (265.5 sq mi)
- Elevation: 1,459 m (4,787 ft)

Population (2022)
  - Total: 39,579
- Time zone: UTC+8 (UTC + 8)
- Area code: +976 (0) 23
- Vehicle registration: НА_ (_ variable)
- Website: Official website

Nalaikh (Mongolian: Налайх [naɮɛ́χ]) is one of nine districts of Ulaanbaatar. It has an area of 687 square kilometres (265 sq mi) and a population of 40,146 in 2026, an increase of 246 over the previous year.

It is well-known as a former coal-mining town; the now-closed Nalaikh Coal Mine was the first mine in the country, opening in December 1922.

== Organization ==
A settlement grew up around the mine; Nalaikh gained city status in 1961 and became a raion of Ulaanbaatar in 1965. It was later established as a district of Ulaanbaatar following the 1992 reorganization of administrative divisions in Mongolia. The district consists of 8 khoroos and 50 khesegs.

It consists of Shokhoi, Arjanchivlan, the Terelj holiday center, and other residential areas, as well as a former Soviet military cantonment, including an airfield.

== Coal mining ==
The Nalaikh Coal Mine opened on 25 December 1922. In July 1938, a narrow-gauge railway line was built connecting Nalaikh to Ulaanbaatar's city center to transport coal from the mine. The mine supplied brown coal to Ulaanbaatar's thermal power plants and employed around 1,500 people.

Since the closure of the coal mine in December 1995, the district has had a high rate of unemployment. Up to 2000 illegal, itinerant miners risk their lives to dig there from October to May with minimal or no safety measures. About a dozen miners are killed annually, but they can each make up to 1.5 million tugriks ($842) a month, when the national income averages only 631,000 tugriks. The government claims there were 234 mining-related deaths in a quarter century, but locals state there were hundreds more.

The mining company Tsagaan Shonkhoor, which is interested in reopening the mine, estimates there are still coal reserves of around 24 million tons.

== Notable people ==
- Kyokutenhō Masaru (born 1974), a top sumo wrestler in Japan born in Nalaikh
- Puntsagiin Sükhbat (1964–2015), a freestyle wrestler born in Naliakh

== See also ==
- Nalaikh Mosque
- Nalaikh Thermal Plant
- Gorkhi-Terelj National Park
