= Khoroolol =

Administrative divisions of Mongolia

A khoroolol (/xɔːˈroʊlɒl/; Mongolian: хороолол [χɔˈɾɔɮɜɮ]) is a residential complex of Mongolia, equivalent to a neighbourhood. In densely built residential areas, it is similar to a quarter (cf. mikrorayon). In Ulaanbaatar, the apartment khoroolols built during socialist times carry numbers between one and nineteen, though some are named after higher numbers like 40,000 and 120,000.
