= Kheseg =

Smallest subdivison of Ulaanbaatar, Mongolia

A kheseg (Mongolian: хэсэг) is the fourth-level administrative subdivision of Mongolia. It is the smallest subdivision of the capital city Ulaanbaatar and the direct subdivision of khoroo.

== Terminology ==
Kheseg is equivalent term for neighbourhood.

== Government ==
A kheseg is headed by a kheseg leader as the governance of a kheseg. A typical kheseg usually consists of 300–500 households.
