= Bayangol, Ulaanbaatar =

District in Ulaanbaatar, Mongolia

Bayangol District Баянгол дүүрэг ᠪᠠᠶᠠᠨᠭᠣᠣᠯᠲᠡᠭᠦᠷᠭᠡ
- Municipal district
- Flag Coat of arms
- Interactive map of Bayangol District
- Coordinates: 47°55′N 106°55′E
- Country: Mongolia
- Municipality: Ulaanbaatar
- Oktyabr raion of Ulaanbaatar: 1965
- Reorganized as district: 1992

Government
  - Body: Citizens' Representatives Khural of the Bayangol district
  - Governor of District: Ö.Sumiyaabaatar, MPP

Area
  - Total: 29.5 km^{2} (11.4 sq mi)

Population (January 1, 2024)
  - Total: 252,979
  - Density: 8,580/km^{2} (22,200/sq mi)
- Time zone: UTC+8 (UTC + 8)
- Website: www.bgd.mn

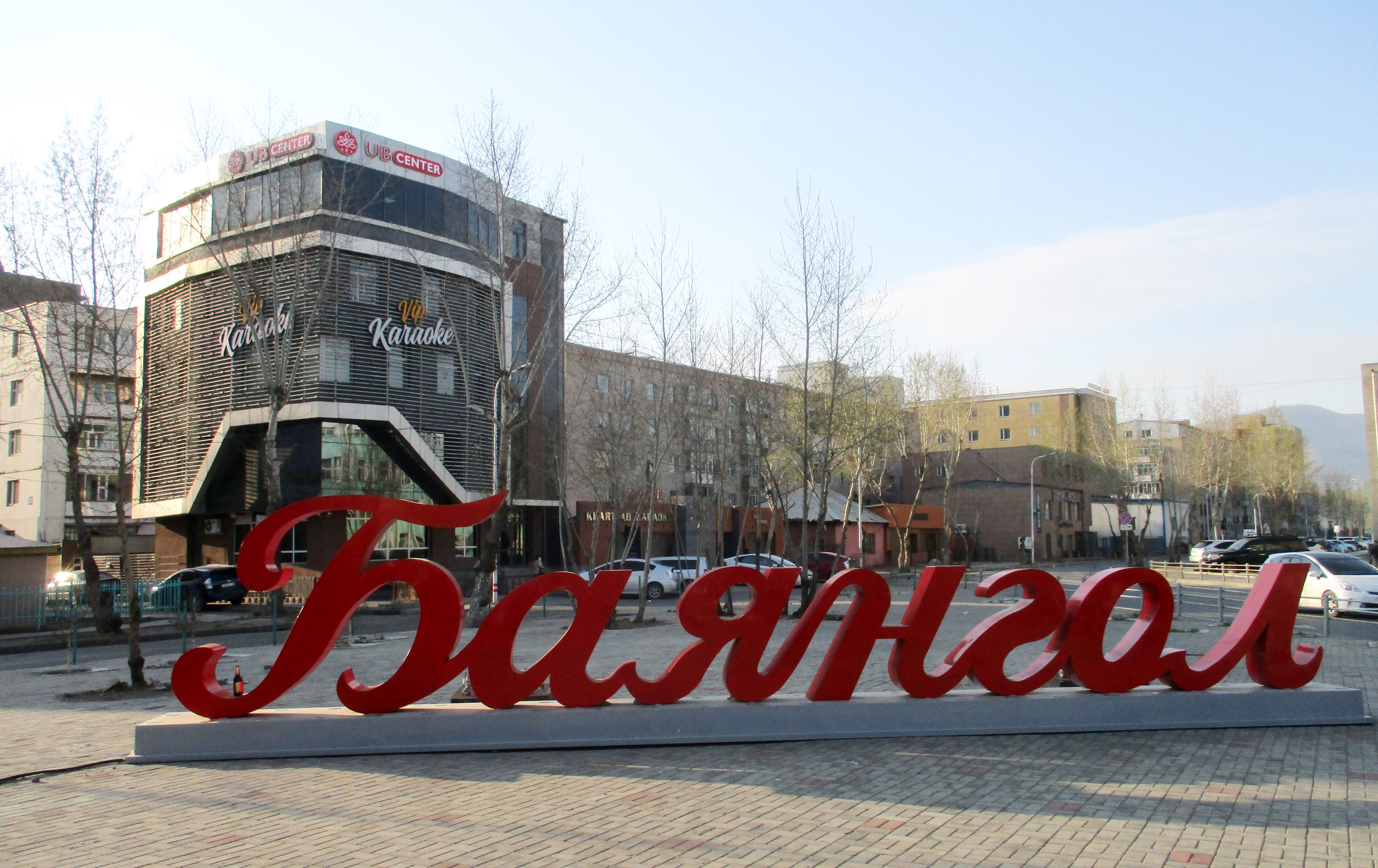
Bayangol entrance sign in Ulaanbaatar

Bayangol (Mongolian: Баянгол; lit. 'Rich River') is one of nine districts of Ulaanbaatar. It is divided into 23 subdistricts. It was previously called October District (Октябрийн райо) before 1992.

== History ==
Bayangol district was first established in 1965, as the main center of the city of Ulaanbaatar. Consisting of: Sukhbaatar, Nairamdal, Ajilchin and Oktaybr in which the modern day district developed from Oktaybr. In early 1990 — reforms were introduced after the Mongolian Revolution of 1990 to balance the workloads. with reducing the excessive concentration of production and services. On August 18th of 1992, the Parliament had Oktaybr split into Bayangol and Songino Khairkhan districts.

== Demographics and Statistics ==
Bayangol has a 2,949 yards of land, 52 schools and 76 kindergartens, 71,371 residents, 37,079 organizations, population of 259,411 with a population density of about 8,796 per square kilometer. Which about the population, 54% consists of adults, 33% consists of children, 4,113 people with disability, 2,424 pregnant women, 2,106 elderly population, 1,745 children without at least 1 parent, 3,101 single parent households and 7,697 elderly people on households according to 2022–2023 study.

== Administrative divisions ==
The district consists of 34 khoroo and 268 khesegs, with 26th khoroo being the most populated out of the 34.

== Infrastructure ==
- Thermal Power Plant No. 2 (Ulaanbaatar)
- Thermal Power Plant No. 4 (Ulaanbaatar)
- Third State Central Hospital
- Headquarters of the Mongolian National Bandy Federation.

== Tourist attractions ==
- Gandantegchinlen Monastery
