= Central Museum of Dinosaurs of Mongolia =

Defunct paleontological museum in Chingeltei, Ulaanbaatar, Mongolia

Coordinates: 47.9234°N 106.9057°E

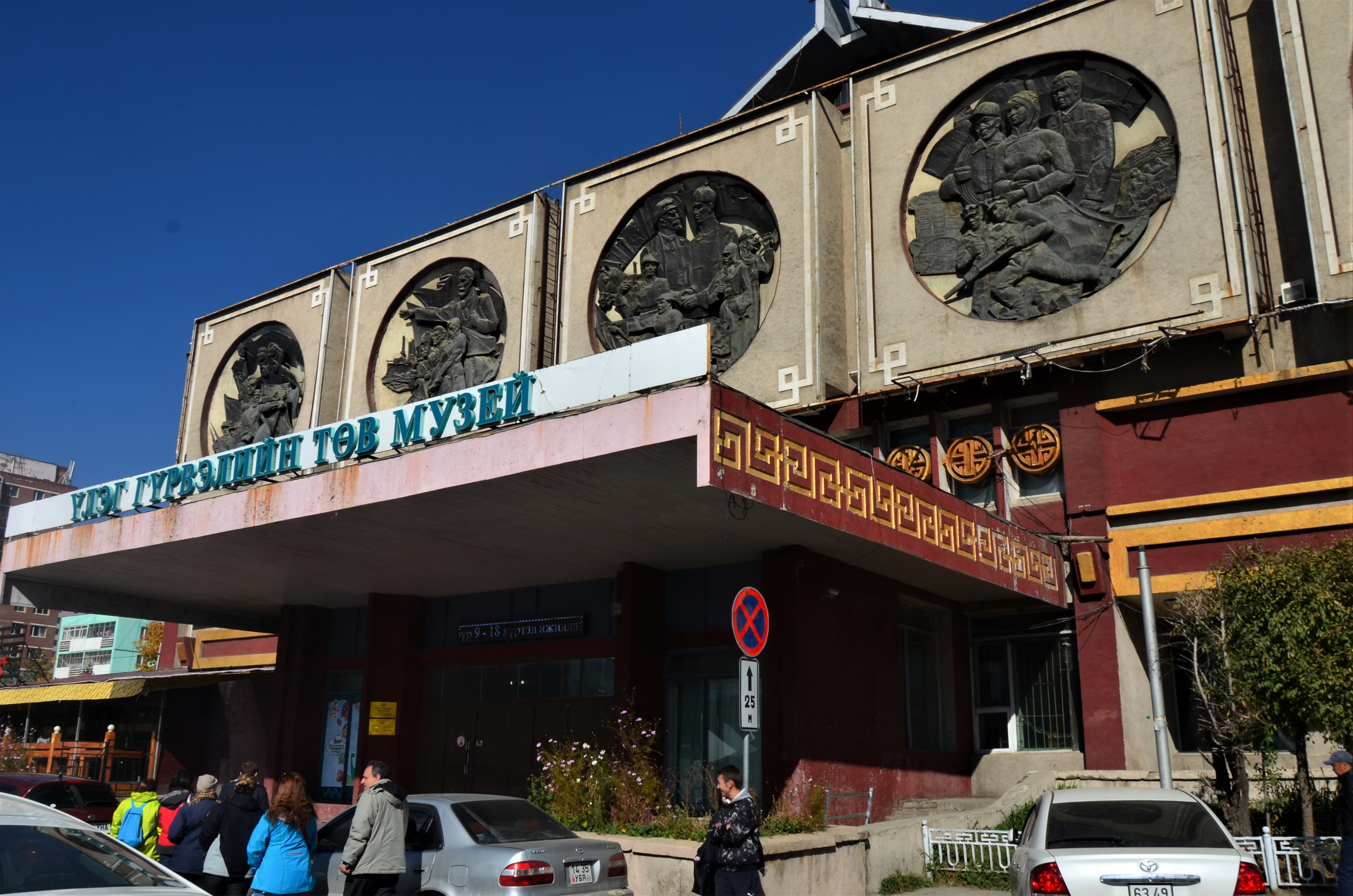
Central Museum of Dinosaurs of Mongolia

The Central Museum of Dinosaurs of Mongolia (Mongolian: Монголын Үлэг Гүрвэлийн Төв Музей) was a paleontological museum in Chingeltei District, Ulaanbaatar. It was dedicated to the preservation and discovery of dinosaur fossils. The museum was finished in 1974.

In August 2019 the Dinosaur Museum was merged into the Natural History Museum, which now occupies the Dinosaur Museum's former premises. The old Natural History Museum building was demolished in 2019 and a new Chinggis Khaan National Museum built in its place.
