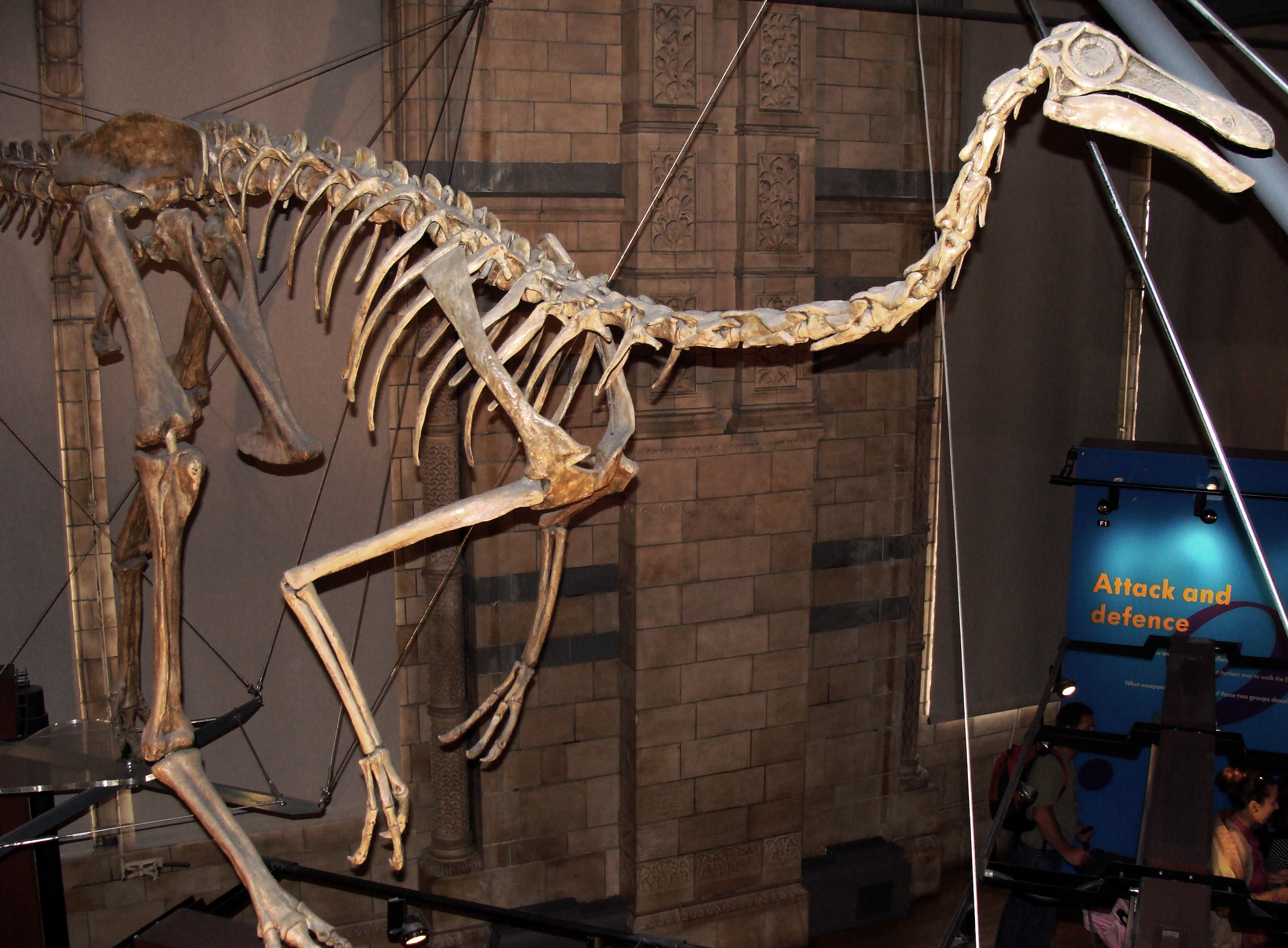
- Reconstructed skeleton (based on the adult holotype and a juvenile specimen), Natural History Museum

Scientific classification
- Kingdom: Animalia
- Phylum: Chordata
- Class: Reptilia
- Clade: Dinosauria
- Clade: Saurischia
- Clade: Theropoda
- Clade: †Ornithomimosauria
- Family: †Ornithomimidae
- Genus: †Gallimimus; Osmólska et al., 1972
- Species: †G. bullatus

Binomial name
- †Gallimimus bullatus Osmólska et al., 1972

Synonyms
- Ornithomimus bullatus Paul, 1988

= Gallimimus =

Gallimimus Temporal range: Late Cretaceous, Maastrichtian

Genus of dinosaurs from the Late Cretaceous Period

Gallimimus (/ˌɡælɪˈmaɪməs/ GAL-im-EYE-məs) is a genus of theropod dinosaur that lived in what is now Mongolia during the Late Cretaceous period. Several fossils in various stages of growth were discovered by Polish-Mongolian expeditions in the Gobi Desert of Mongolia during the 1960s; a large skeleton discovered in this region was made the holotype specimen of the new genus and species Gallimimus bullatus in 1972. The generic name means "chicken mimic", referring to the similarities between its neck vertebrae and those of the Galliformes. The specific name is derived from bulla, a golden capsule worn by Roman youth, in reference to a bulbous structure at the base of the skull of Gallimimus. At the time it was named, the fossils of Gallimimus represented the most complete and best preserved ornithomimid ("ostrich dinosaur") material yet discovered, and the genus remains one of the best known members of the group.

Gallimimus is the largest known ornithomimid; adults were about 6 metres (20 ft) long, 1.9 metres (6 ft 3 in) tall at the hip and weighed about 400–490 kilograms (880–1,080 lb). As evidenced by its relative Ornithomimus, it is highly likely it would have had feathers. The head was small and light with large eyes that faced to the sides. The snout was long compared to other ornithomimids, although it was broader and more rounded at the tip than in other species. Gallimimus was toothless with a keratinous (horny) beak, and had a delicate lower jaw. Many of the vertebrae had openings that indicate they were pneumatic (air-filled). The neck was proportionally long in relation to the trunk. The hands were proportionally the shortest of any ornithomimosaur and each had three digits with curved claws. The forelimbs were weak while the hindlimbs were proportionally long. The family Ornithomimidae is part of the group Ornithomimosauria. Anserimimus, also from Mongolia, is thought to have been the closest relative of Gallimimus.

As an ornithomimid, Gallimimus would have been a fleet (or cursorial) animal, using its speed to escape predators; its speed has been estimated at 42–56 km/h (29–34 mph). It may have had good vision and intelligence comparable to ratite birds. Gallimimus may have lived in groups, based on the discovery of several specimens preserved in a bone bed. Various theories have been proposed regarding the diet of Gallimimus and other ornithomimids. The highly mobile neck may have helped locate small prey on the ground, but it may also have been an opportunistic omnivore. It has also been suggested that it used small columnar structures in its beak for filter-feeding in water, though these structures may instead have been ridges used for feeding on tough plant material, indicative of a herbivorous diet. Gallimimus is the most commonly found ornithomimosaur in the Nemegt Formation, where it lived alongside its relatives Anserimimus and Deinocheirus. Gallimimus was featured in the movie Jurassic Park, in a scene that was important to the history of special effects, and in shaping the common conception of dinosaurs as bird-like animals.

== History of discovery ==
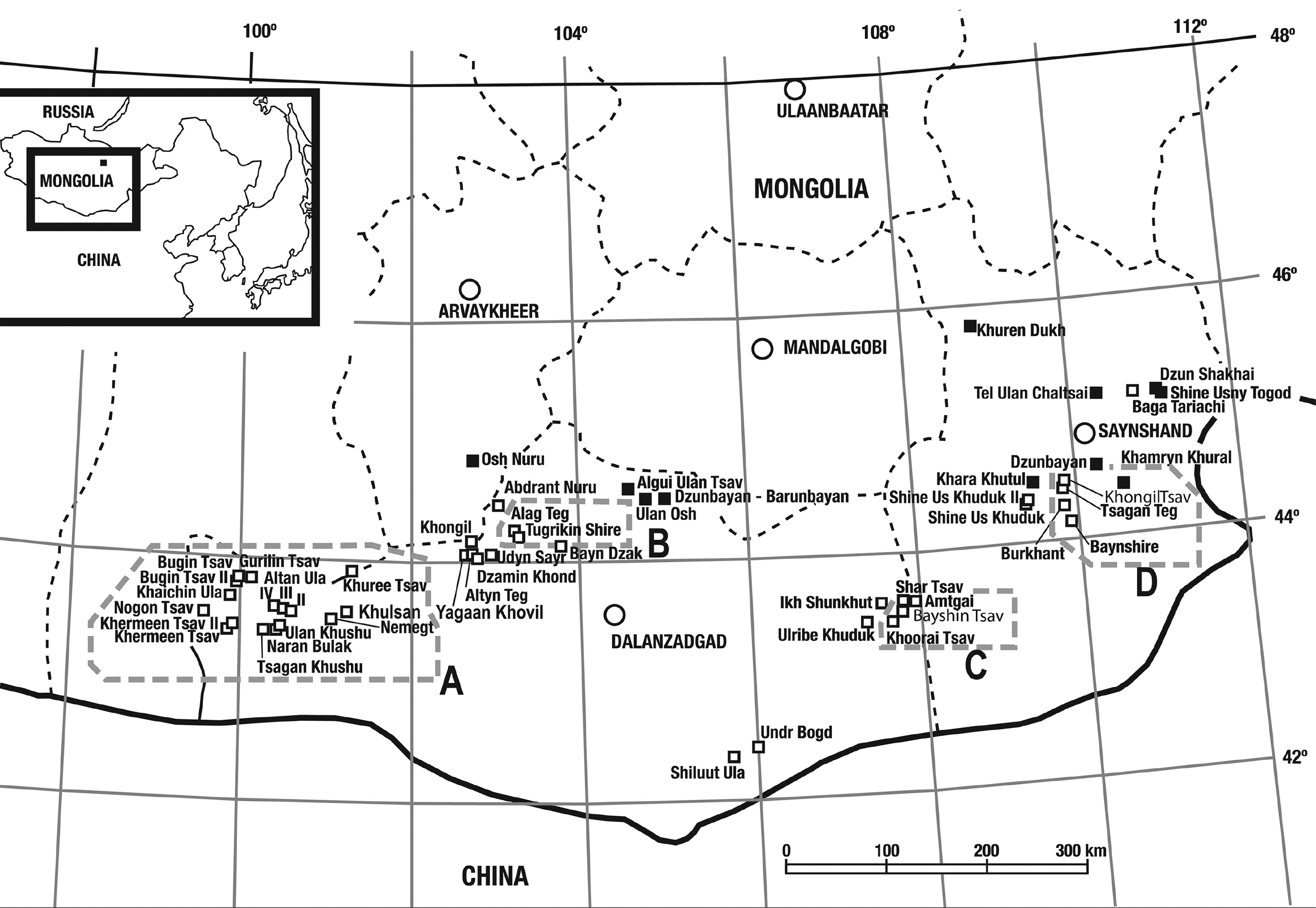
Cretaceous-aged dinosaur fossil localities of Mongolia; Gallimimus fossils were collected in area A

Between 1963 and 1965, the Polish Academy of Sciences and the Mongolian Academy of Sciences organised the Polish-Mongolian palaeontological expeditions to the Gobi Desert of Mongolia. Among the dinosaur remains discovered in sand beds of the Nemegt Basin were numerous ornithomimids at different growth stages from the Nemegt, Tsaagan Khushuu, Altan Ula IV and Naran Bulak localities. Three partially complete skeletons, two with skulls, as well as many fragmentary remains, were collected. The largest skeleton (later to become the holotype of Gallimimus bullatus) was discovered by palaeontologist Zofia Kielan-Jaworowska in Tsaagan Khushuu in 1964; it was preserved lying on its back, and the skull was found under its pelvis. One small specimen was also found in Tsaagan Khushuu the same year, and another small specimen was found in the Nemegt locality. A small skeleton without forelimbs was discovered in 1967 by the Mongolian palaeontological expedition in Bugeen Tsav outside the Nemegt Basin. The fossils were housed at the Mongolian, Polish and USSR Academy of Sciences. The Polish-Mongolian expeditions were notable for being led by women, some of whom were among the first women to name new dinosaurs. The fossils discovered in these expeditions shed new light on the interchange of fauna between Asia and North America during the Cretaceous period. Some of the skeletons were exhibited in Warsaw in 1968, mounted in tall, semi-erect postures, which was accepted at the time, though more horizontal postures are favoured today.

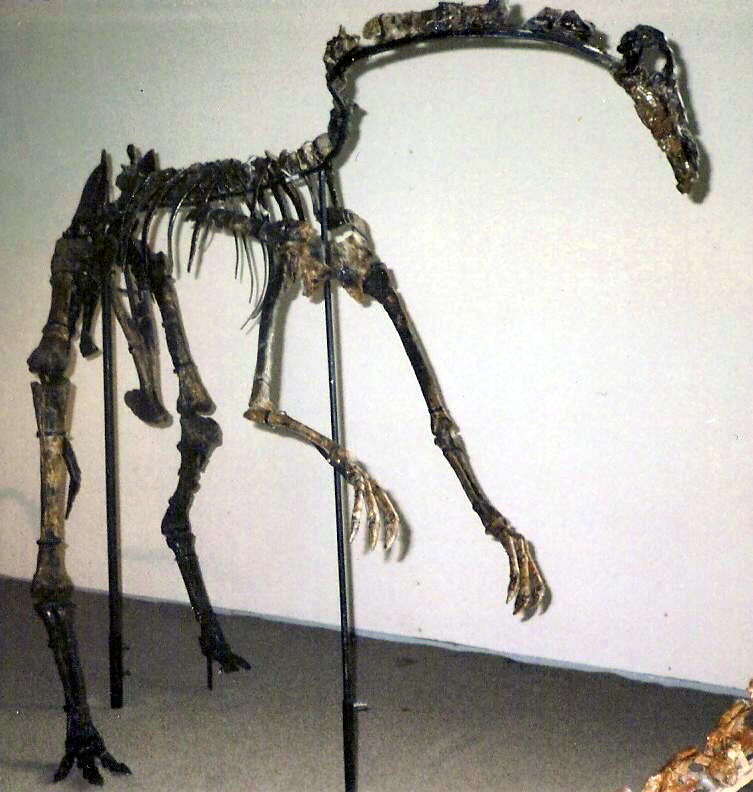
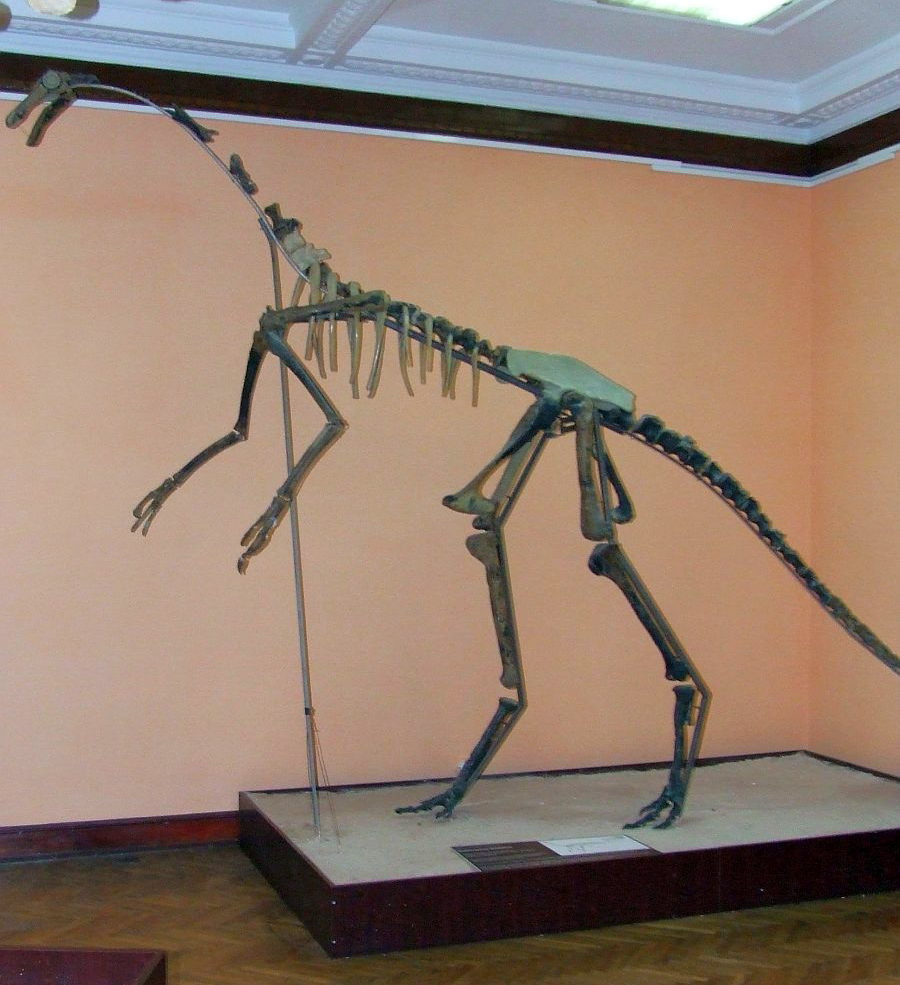
Holotype skeleton IGM 100/11, during a temporary exhibition in Experimentarium (left), and reconstructed cast of the same skeleton in a semi-erect posture, MEPAS

In 1972, palaeontologists Halszka Osmólska, Ewa Roniewicz and Rinchen Barsbold named the new genus and species Gallimimus bullatus, using the largest collected skeleton, specimen IGM 100/11 (from Tsaagan Khushuu, formerly referred to as G.I.No.DPS 100/11 and MPD 100/11), as the holotype. The generic name is derived from the Latin gallus, "chicken", and the Greek mimos, "mimic", in reference to the front part of the neck vertebrae which resembled those of the Galliformes. The specific name is derived from the Latin bulla, a gold capsule worn by Roman youth around the neck, in reference to the bulbous capsule on the parasphenoid at the base of the dinosaur's skull. Such a feature had not been described from other reptiles at the time, and was considered unusual. The holotype consists of an almost complete skeleton with a distorted snout, incomplete lower jaw, vertebral series, pelvis, as well as some missing hand and foot bones.

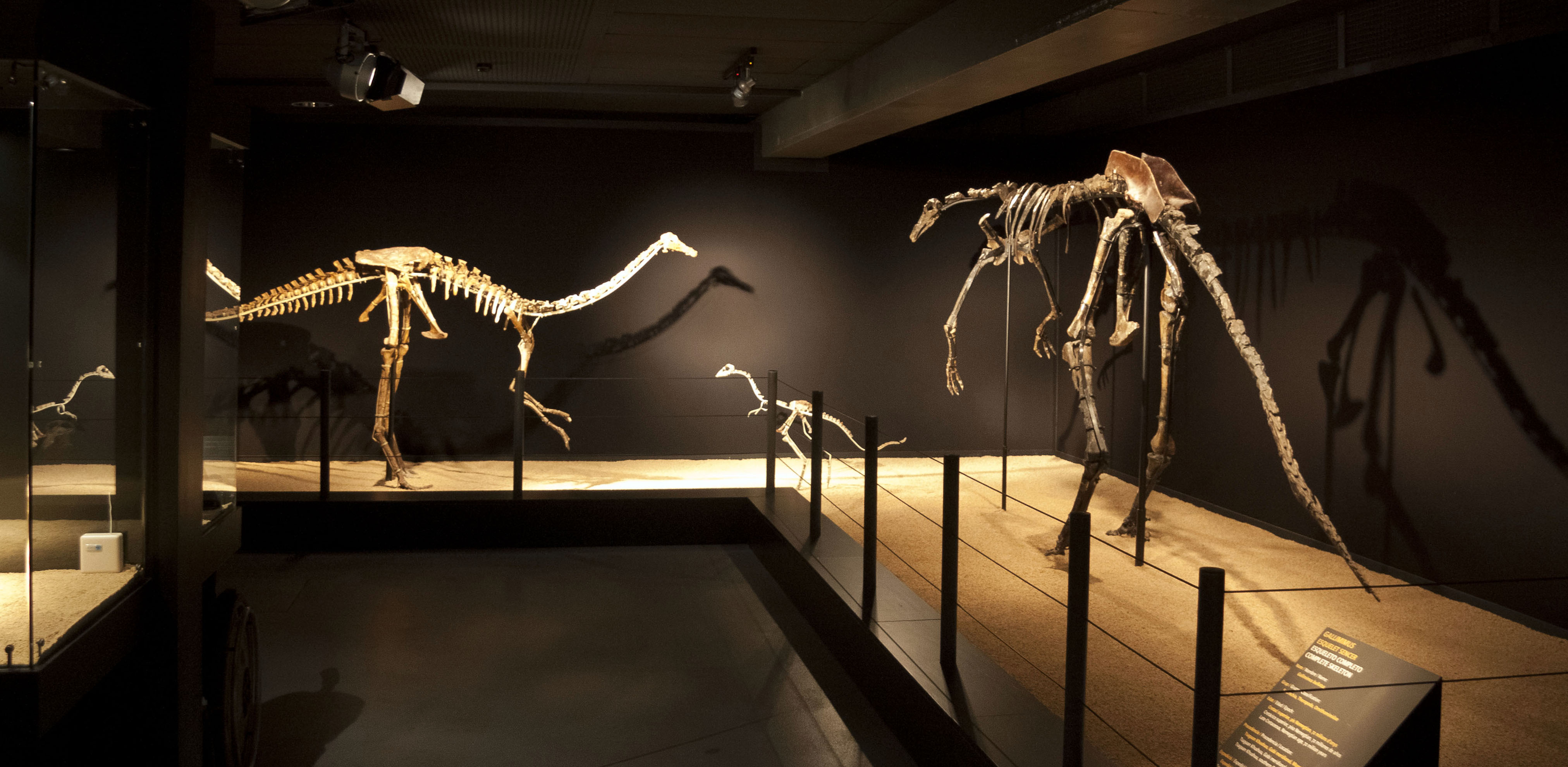
Three skeletons, including the holotype (right) and a juvenile (middle), during a temporary exhibition in CosmoCaixa

The other partially complete skeletons were juveniles; ZPAL MgD-I/1 (from Tsaagan Khushuu) has a crushed skull with a missing tip, damaged vertebrae, fragmented ribs, pectoral girdle and forelimbs, and an incomplete left hind limb, ZPAL MgD-I/94 (from the Nemegt locality) lacks the skull, atlas, tip of the tail, pectoral girdle and forelimbs, while the smallest specimen, IGM 100/10 (from Bugeen Tsav), lacks a pectoral girdle, forelimbs and several vertebrae and ribs. Osmólska and colleagues listed twenty-five known specimens in all, nine of which were only represented by single bones.

At the time it was named, the fossils of Gallimimus represented the most complete and best preserved ornithomimid material yet discovered, and the genus remains one of the best known members of the group. Ornithomimids were previously known mainly from North America, Archaeornithomimus being the only prior known member from Asia (though without a skull). Since the first discoveries, more specimens have been found by further Mongolian-led international expeditions. Three of the Gallimimus skeletons (including the holotype) later became part of a travelling exhibit of Mongolian dinosaur fossils, which toured various countries.

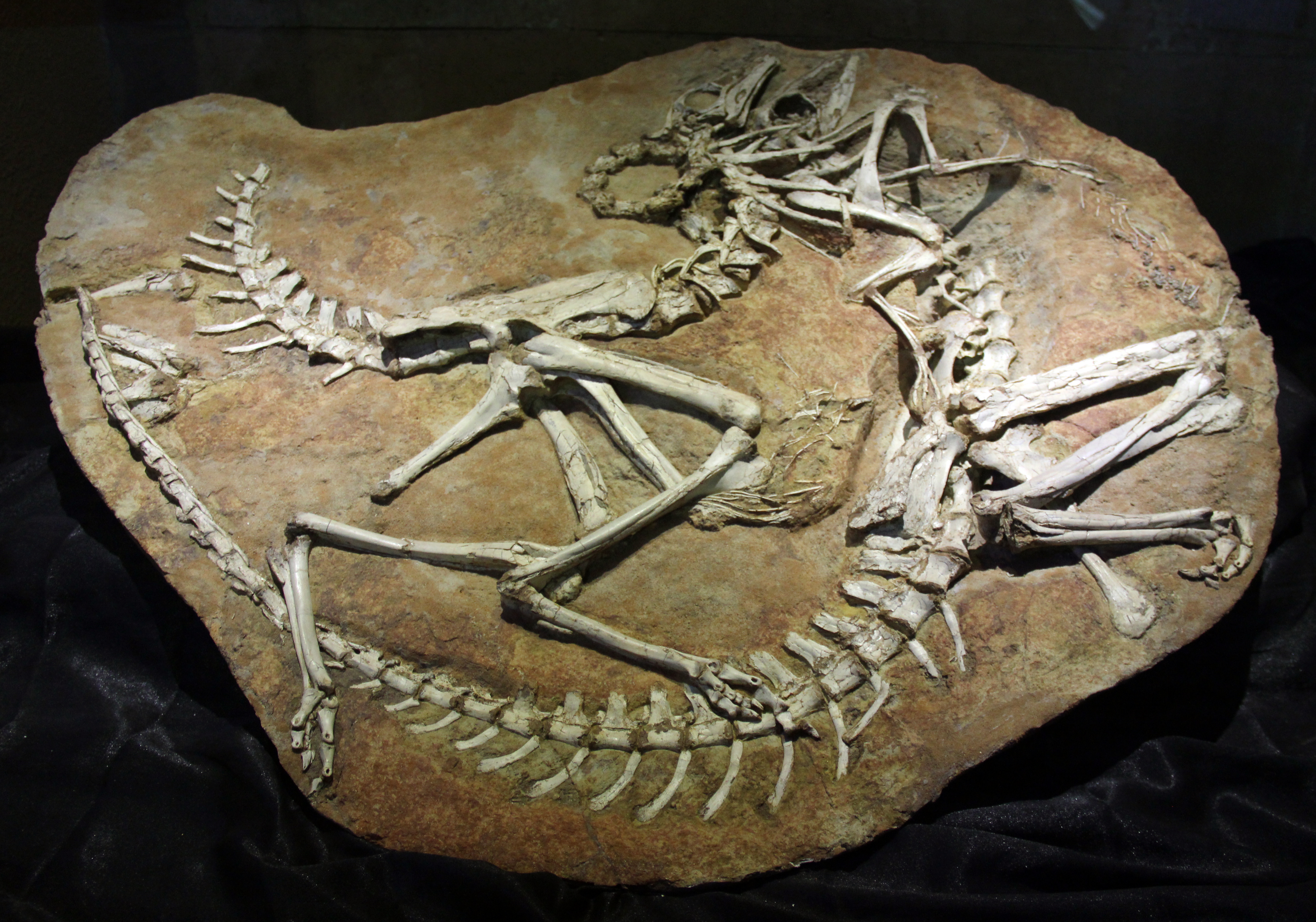
Specimens which were repatriated to Mongolia after having been smuggled to the US, in Central Museum of Mongolian Dinosaurs

Fossil poaching has become a serious problem in Mongolia in the 21st century, and several Gallimimus specimens have been looted. In 2017, Hang-Jae Lee and colleagues reported a fossil trackway discovered in 2009 associated with a clenched Gallimimus foot (specimen MPC-D100F/17). The rest of the skeleton appeared to have been removed previously by poachers, along with several other Gallimimus specimens (as indicated by empty excavation pits, garbage, and scattered broken bones in the quarry). It is unusual to find tracks closely associated with body fossils; some of the tracks are consistent with ornithomimid feet, while others belong to different dinosaurs. In 2014, a slab with two Gallimimus specimens was repatriated to Mongolia along with other dinosaur skeletons, after having been smuggled to the US.

=== Alternative taxonomic assignments ===
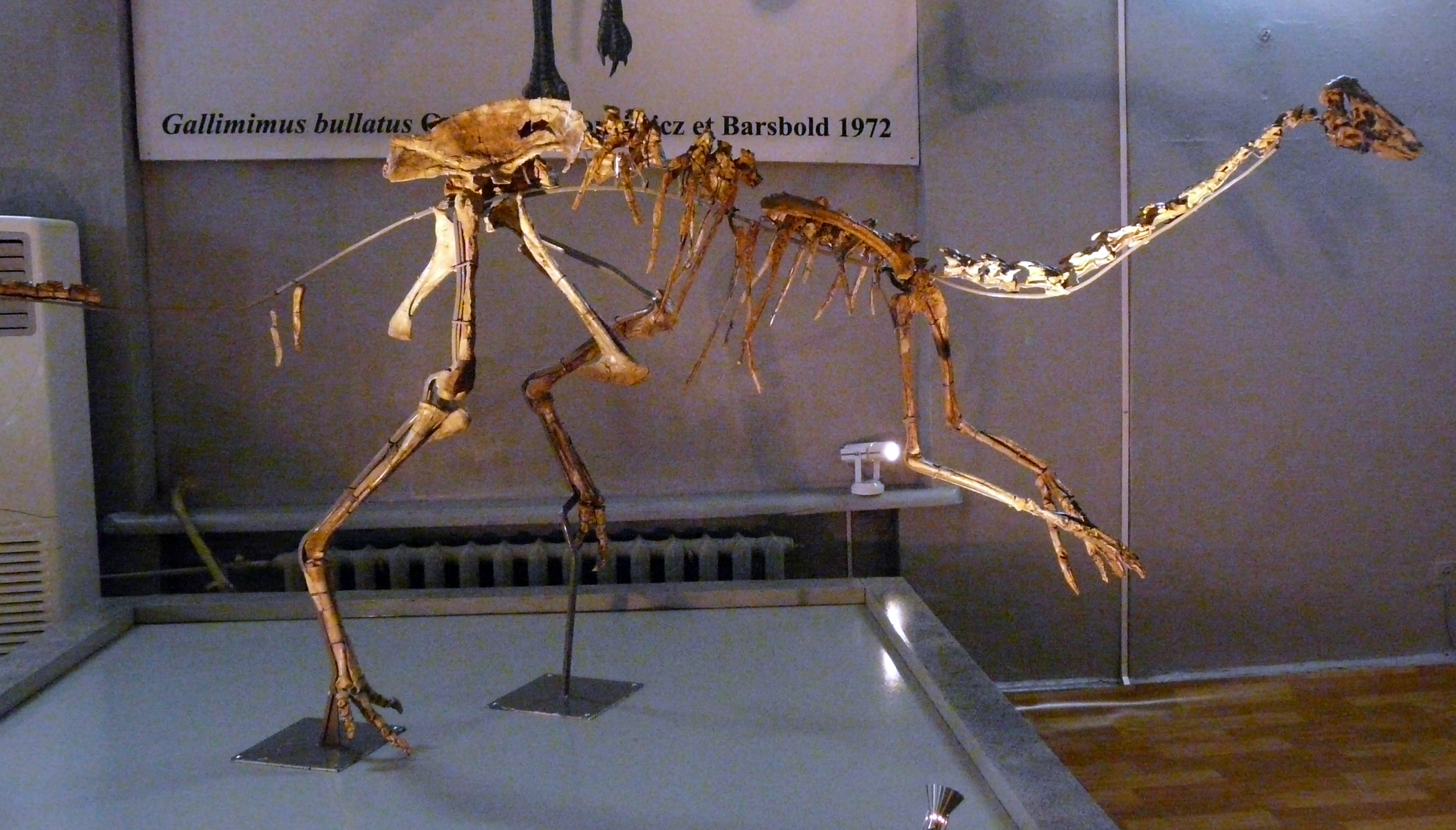
Specimen informally known as "Gallimimus mongoliensis", which probably belongs to a different genus

In 1988, the palaeontologist Gregory S. Paul concluded that the skulls of ornithomimids were more similar to each other than previously thought and moved most species into the same genus, Ornithomimus, resulting in the new combination O. bullatus. In 2010, he instead listed it as "Gallimimus (or Struthiomimus) bullatus", but returned to using only the genus name Gallimimus in 2016. The species involved have generally been kept in separate genera by other writers.

An ornithomimid vertebra from Japan informally named "Sanchusaurus" was reported in a 1988 magazine, but was assigned to Gallimimus sp. (of uncertain species) by the palaeontologist Dong Zhiming and colleagues in 1990. In 2000, the palaeontologist Philip J. Currie proposed that Anserimimus, which is only known from one skeleton from Mongolia, was a junior synonym of Gallimimus, but this was dismissed by Kobayashi and Barsbold, who pointed out several differences between the two. Barsbold noted some morphological variation among newer Gallimimus specimens, though this has never been published. Barsbold informally referred to a nearly complete skeleton (IGM 100/14) as "Gallimimus mongoliensis", but since it differs from Gallimimus in some details, Yoshitsugu Kobayashi and Barsbold proposed in 2006 that it probably belongs to a different genus.

== Description ==
Size compared to a human

Gallimimus is the largest known member of the family Ornithomimidae. The adult holotype (specimen IGM 100/11) was about 6 metres (20 ft) long and 1.9 metres (6.2 ft) tall at the hip; its skull was 330 millimetres (1.08 ft) long and the femur (thigh bone) was 660 millimetres (2.17 ft). It would have weighed about 400–490 kilograms (880–1,080 lb). In comparison, one juvenile specimen (ZPAL MgD-I/94) was about 2.15 metres (7.1 ft) long, 0.79 metres (2.6 ft) tall at the hip, and weighed about 26–30.2 kilograms (57–67 lb). Based on fossils of the related Ornithomimus, it is known that ornithomimosaurs ("ostrich dinosaurs") were feathered, and that the adults bore wing-like structures as evidenced by the presence of quill-knobs on the ulna bone of the lower arm, bumps that indicate where feathers would have attached.

=== Skull ===
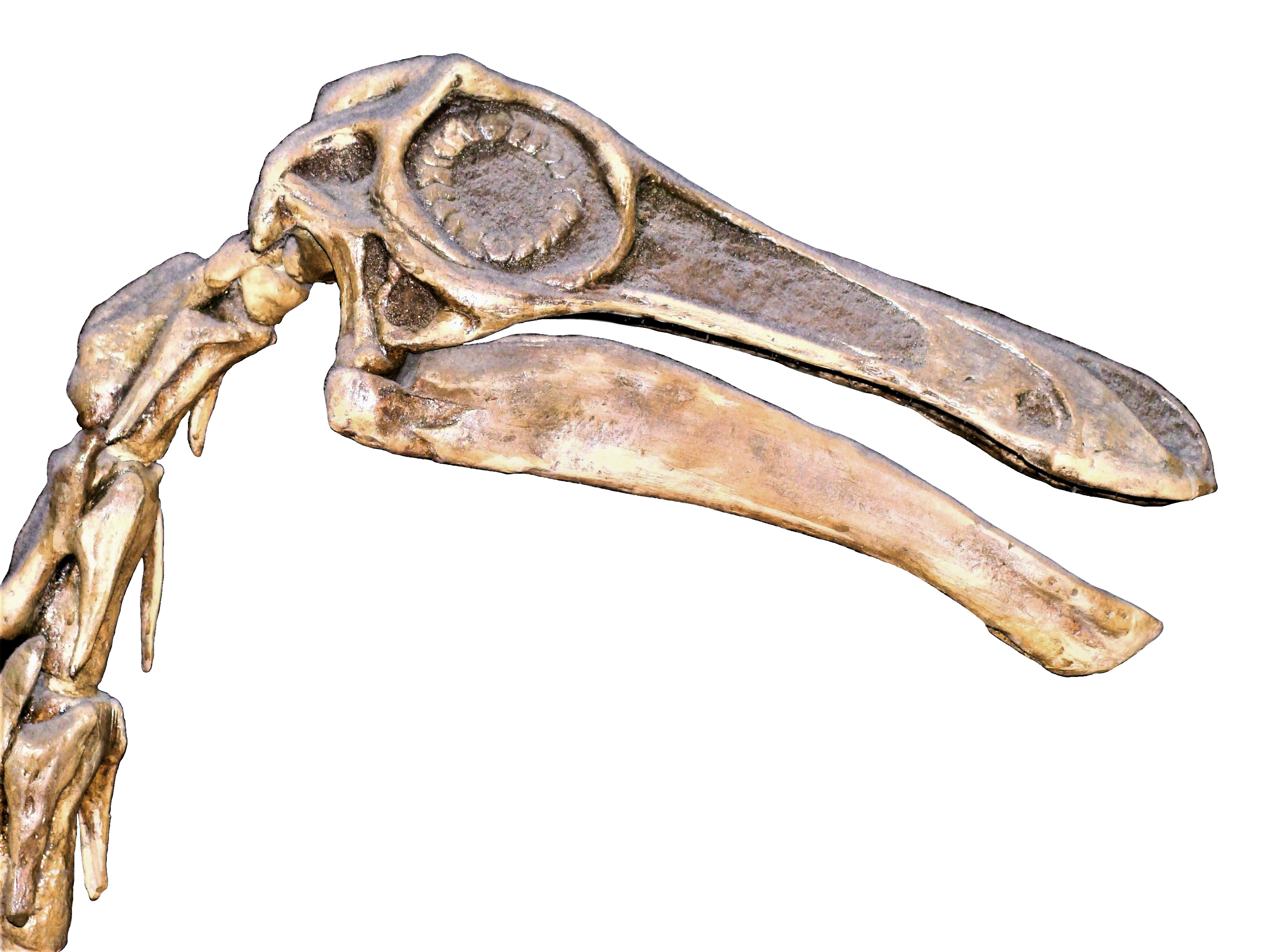
Reconstructed skull and neck, NHM

The head of Gallimimus was very small and light compared to the vertebral column. Due to the length of its snout, the skull was long compared to other ornithomimids, and the snout had a gently convex sloping upper profile. The side profile of the snout differed from other ornithomimids in not narrowing towards its front half, and the lower front margin of the premaxilla at the front of the upper jaw rose upwards, instead of being horizontal. Seen from above, the snout was almost spatulate (spoon-shaped), broad and rounded at the tip (or U-shaped), whereas it was acute (or V-shaped) in North American ornithomimids. The orbits (eye sockets) were large and faced sideways, as in other ornithomimids. The temporal region at the side of the skull behind the eyes was deep, and the infratemporal fenestra (the lower opening behind the orbit) was nearly triangular and smaller than that of the related Struthiomimus. It had deep muscle scars at the back part of the skull roof, along the parietal bone. The parasphenoid (a bone of the braincase, at the underside of the skull's base) was thin-walled, hollow and formed a pear-shaped, bulbous structure. The structure had a shallow furrow which opened towards the front. The internal nares (internal openings for the nasal passage) were large and placed far back on the palate, due to the presence of an extensive secondary palate, which was common to ornithomimids.

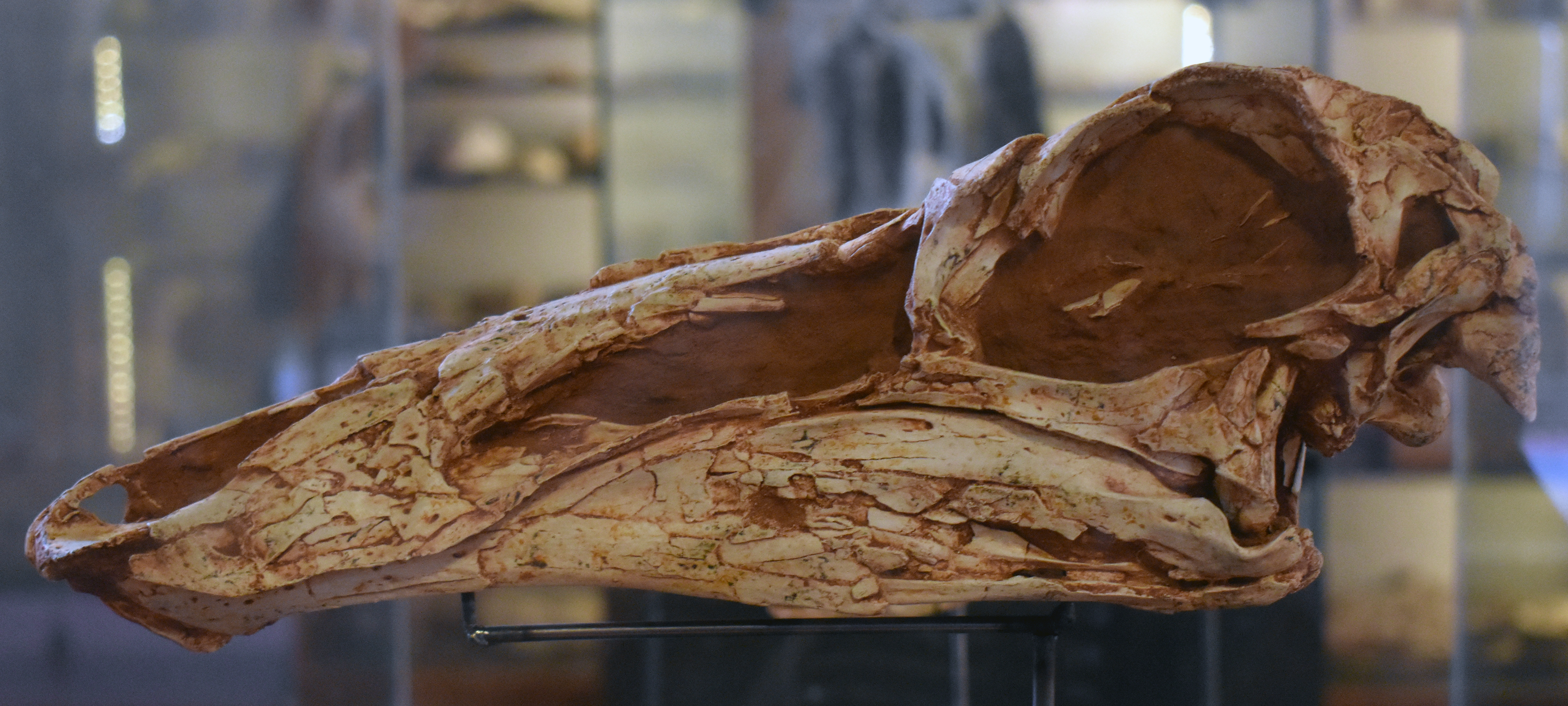
Skull in Dinosauria Museum

The delicate lower jaw, consisting of thin bones, was slender and shallow at the front, deepening towards the rear. The front of the mandible was shovel-like, resulting in a gap between the tips of the jaws when shut. The shovel-like shape was similar to that of the common seagull, and the lower beak may have had a shape similar to that of this bird. The retroarticular process at the back of the jaw (where jaw muscles attached that opened the beak) was well developed and consisted mainly of the angular bone. The surangular was the largest bone of the lower jaw, which is usual in theropods. The mandibular fenestra, a sidewards-facing opening in the lower jaw, was elongated and comparatively small. The lower jaw did not have a coronoid process or a supradentary bone, the lack of which is a common feature of beaked theropods (ornithomimosaurs, oviraptorosaurs, therizinosaurs and birds), but unusual among theropods in general. The jaws of Gallimimus were edentulous (toothless), and the front part would have been covered in a keratinous rhamphotheca (horny beak) in life. The beak may have covered a smaller area than in North American relatives, based on the lack of nourishing foramina on the maxilla. The inner side of the beak had small, tightly packed and evenly spaced columnar structures (their exact nature is debated), which were longest at the front and shortening towards the back.

=== Postcranial skeleton ===
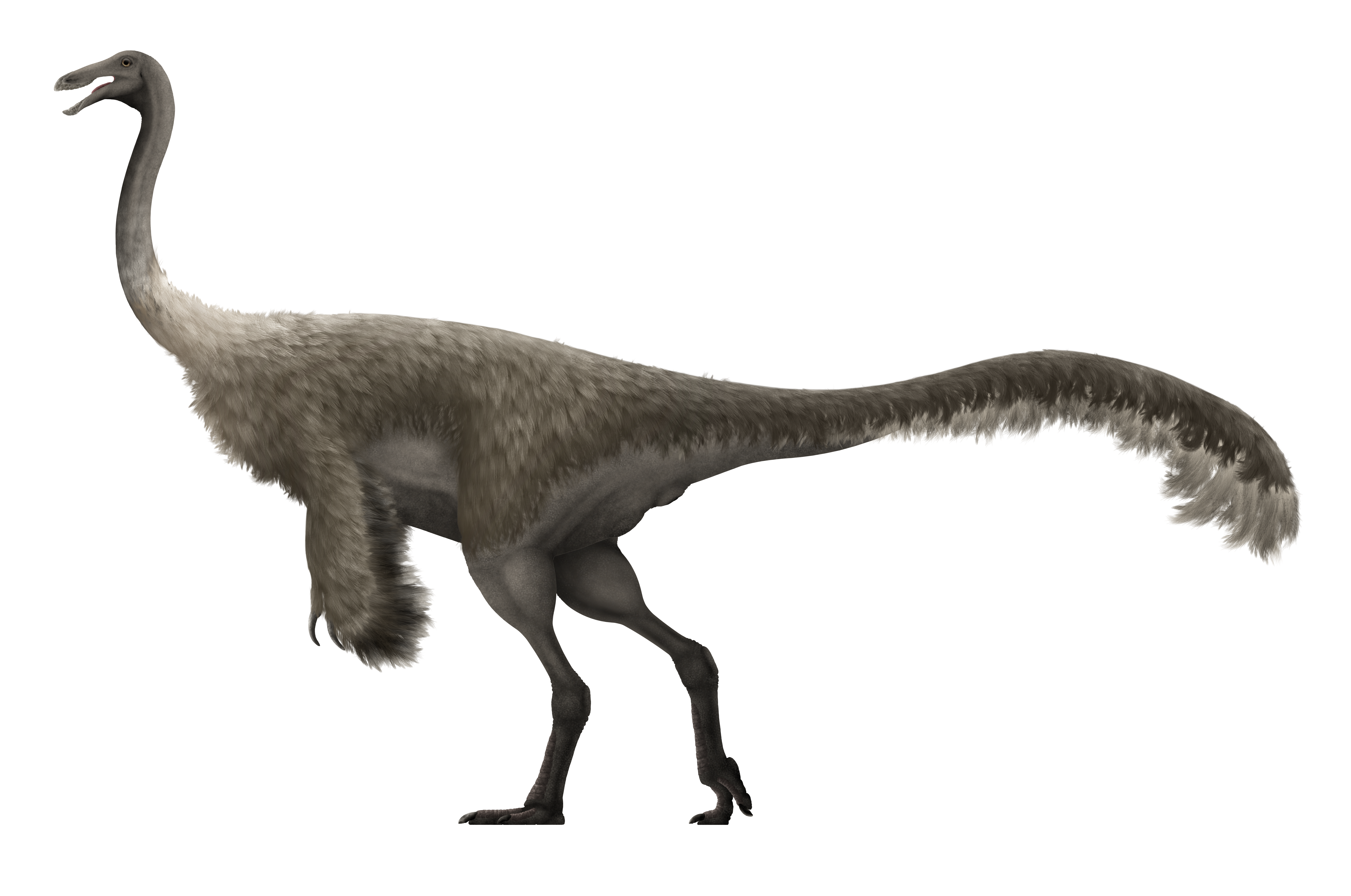
Life restoration showing an adult with feathers, based on those known from the related Ornithomimus

Gallimimus had 64–66 vertebrae in its spine, fewer than other ornithomimids. The centra (or bodies) of the vertebrae were platycoelous, with a flat front surface and a concave hind surface, except for the first six caudal (tail) vertebra—where the hind surface was also flat—and those at the end of the tail—which were amphiplatyan with both surfaces flat. Many of the centra had foramina (openings which have also been called "pleurocoels"), and were therefore probably pneumatic (with their hollow chambers invaded by air sacs). The neck consisted of 10 cervical vertebrae, which were all long and wide, except for the atlas bone (the first vertebra that connects with the back of the skull). The atlas differed from that of other ornithomimids in that the front surface of its intercentrum was slanted downwards towards the back, instead of being concave and facing upwards to support the occipital condyle. The neck appears to have been proportionally longer in relation to the trunk than in other ornithomimids. The neck was divided into two distinct sections: the cervical vertebrae at the front had centra which were nearly triangular in side view and tapered towards the back, as well as low neural arches and short, broad zygapophyses (the processes that articulated between the vertebrae); the cervical vertebrae at the back had spool-like centra which became gradually higher, and long, thin zygapophyses. The pneumatic foramina here were small and oval, and the neural spines projecting outwards from the centra formed long, low and sharp ridges, except for in the hindmost cervical vertebrae.

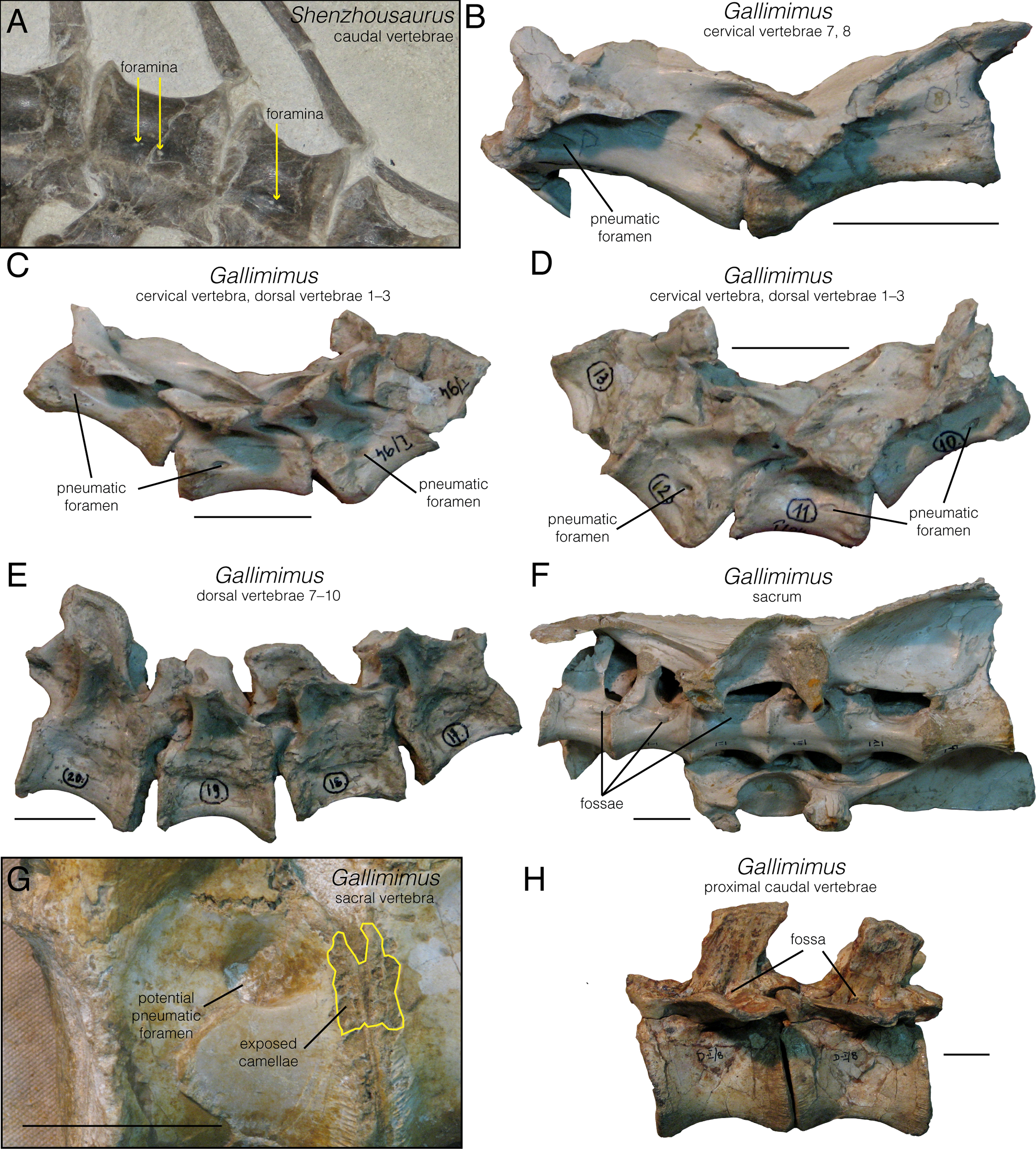
Pneumatic structures in the caudal vertebrae of Shenzhousaurus (A), and the cervical (B, C, D), dorsal (E), sacral (F, G) and caudal (H) vertebrae of Gallimimus

The back of Gallimimus had 13 dorsal vertebrae, with spool-like centra that were short, but tended to become deeper and longer towards the back. Their transverse processes (processes articulating with the ribs) slightly increased in length towards the back. The two first dorsal centra had deep pneumatic foramina, while the rest only had shallow fossae (depressions), and the neural spines were prominent being somewhat triangular or rectangular in shape. The sacrum (fused vertebrae between the pelvic bones) consisted of five sacral vertebrae which were about equal in length. The centra here were spool-like, flattened sideways and had fossae which appear to have continued as deep foramina in some specimens. The neural spines here were rectangular, broad, and higher than those in the dorsal vertebrae. They were higher or equal in height to the upper margin of the iliac blade and were separate, whereas in other ornithomimids they were fused together. The tail had 36–39 caudal vertebrae with the centra of those at the front being spool-shaped, while those at the back were nearly triangular, and elongated across. The neural spines here were high and flat, but diminished backwards, where they became ridge-like. The only sign of pneumaticity in the tail were deep fossae between the neural spines and the transverse process of the two first caudal vertebrae. All the vertebrae in front of the sacrum bore ribs except for the atlas and the last dorsal vertebra.

The scapula (shoulder blade) was short and curved, thin at the front end, and thick at the back. It was connected relatively weakly with the coracoid, which was large and deep from top to bottom. Overall, the forelimbs did not differ much from those of other ornithomimids, all of which were comparatively weak. The humerus (upper arm bone), which had a near circular cross-section, was long and twisted. The deltopectoral crest on the upper front part of the humerus was comparatively small, and therefore provided little surface for attachment of upper arm muscles. The ulna was slender, long and weakly curved, with a nearly triangular shaft. The olecranon (the projection from the elbow) was prominent in adults, but not well developed in juveniles. The radius (the other bone in the lower arm) was long and slender with a more expanded upper end compared to the lower. The manus (hand) was proportionally short compared to those of other ornithomimosaurs, having the smallest manus to humerus length ratio of any member of the group, but was otherwise similar in structure. It had three fingers, which were similarly developed; the first (the "thumb") was the strongest, the third was the weakest and the second was the longest. The unguals (claw bones) were strong, somewhat curved (that of the first finger was most curved) and compressed sideways with a deep groove on each side. The unguals were similarly developed, though the third was slightly smaller.

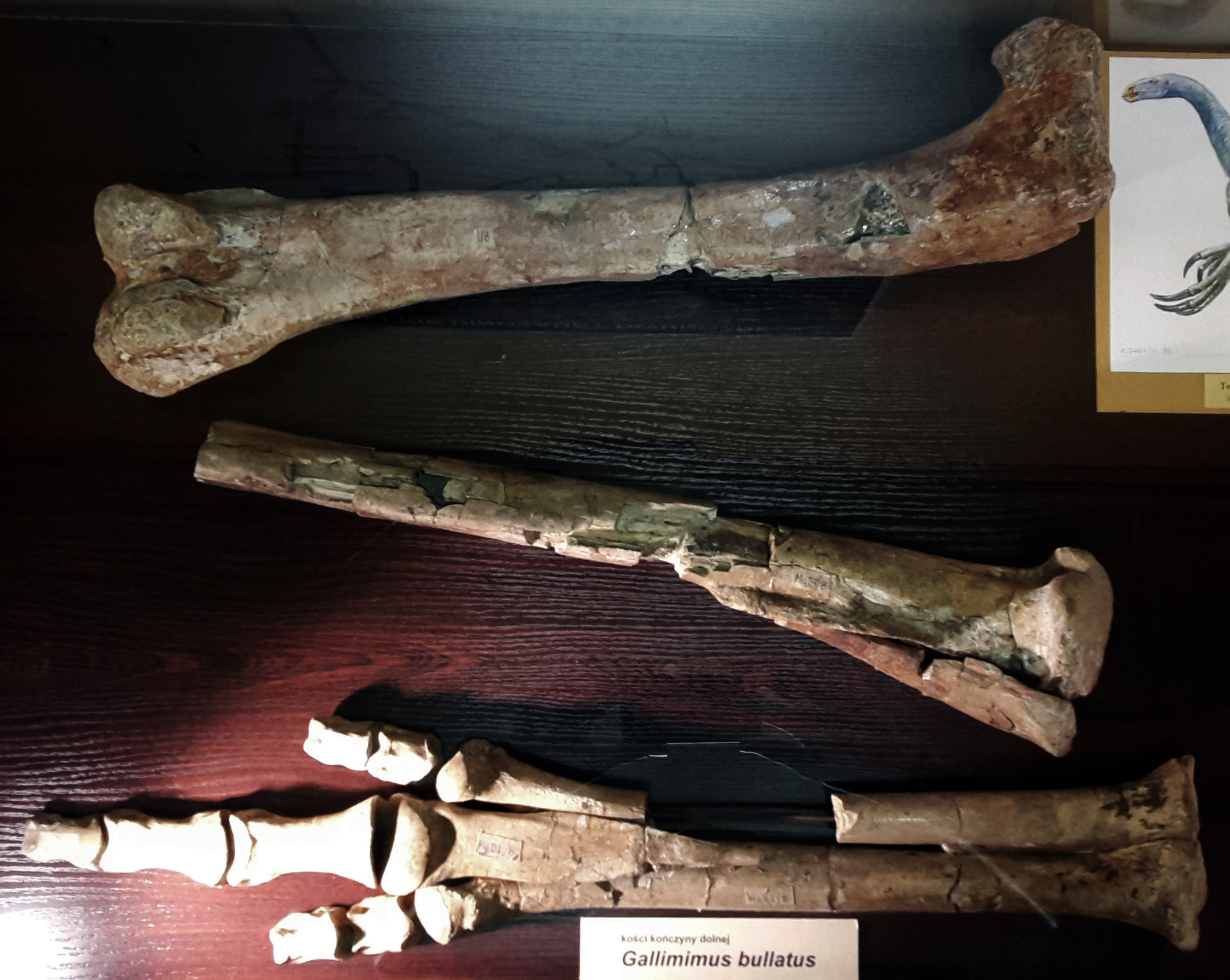
Hindlimb bones of ZPAL MgD-I/8, Museum of Evolution of Polish Academy of Sciences

The pubis (pubic bone) was long and slender, ending in a pubic boot which expanded to the front and back, a general feature of ornithomimosaurs. The hind limbs differed little from those of other ornithomimids, and were proportionally longer than in other theropods. The femur was nearly straight, long and slender, with a sideways flattened shaft. The tibia was straight, long, with two well developed condyles (rounded end of a bone) on the upper end and a flattened lower end. The fibula of the lower leg was flat, thin and broad at the upper end narrowing towards the lower end. The lower half of the third metatarsal was broad when viewed end on, partly covering the adjoining two metatarsals to each side, but narrowed abruptly at mid-length, wedging between those bones and disappearing (an arctometatarsalian foot structure). The third toe was proportionally shorter in relation to the limb than in other ornithomimids. As in other ornithomimids, the foot had no hallux (or dewclaw, the first toe of most other theropods). The unguals of the toes were flat on their lower sides; the outer two declined slightly outwards from their digits.

== Classification ==
Osmólska and colleagues assigned Gallimimus to the family Ornithomimidae in 1972, with the North American Struthiomimus as the closest relative, while lamenting the fact that comparison between taxa was difficult because other ornithomimids known at the time were either poorly preserved or inadequately described. In 1975, Kielan-Jaworowska stated that though many dinosaurs from Asia were placed in the same families as North American relatives, this category of classification tended to be more inclusive than was used for modern birds. She highlighted that while Gallimimus had a rounded beak (similar to a goose or duck), North American ornithomimids had pointed beaks, a difference that would otherwise lead taxonomists to place modern birds in different families. In 1976, Barsbold placed Ornithomimidae in the new group Ornithomimosauria. In 2003, Kobayashi and Jun-Chang Lü found that Anserimimus was the sister taxon to Gallimimus, both forming a derived (or "advanced") clade with North American genera, which was confirmed by Kobayashi and Barsbold in 2006.

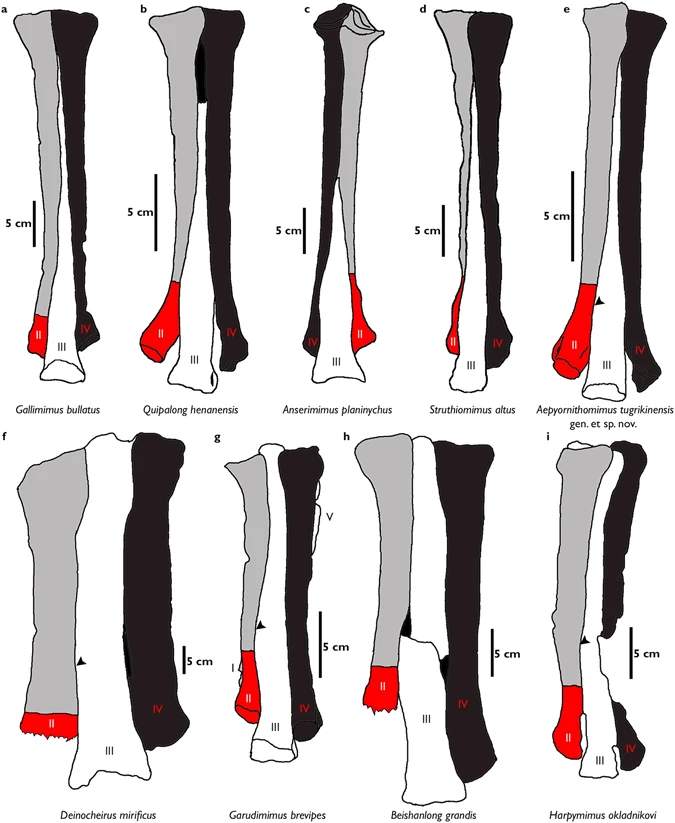
Metatarsal footbones of ornithomimosaurs; the foot of Gallimimus (upper left) was arctometatarsalian (see middle bone in white)

The following cladogram shows the placement of Gallimimus among Ornithomimidae according to the palaeontontologist Bradley McFeeters and colleagues, 2016:

- Ornithomimidae
  - Archaeornithomimus
  - unnamed
    - Bissekty ornithomimid (now Dzharacursor)
    - unnamed
      - Sinornithomimus
      - unnamed
        Gallimimus
      - - Rativates
        - unnamed
          Struthiomimus
        - Qiupalong
        - Anserimimus
        - Ornithomimus

Ornithomimosaurs belonged to the clade Maniraptoriformes of coelurosaurian theropods, which also includes modern birds. Early ornithomimosaurs had teeth, which were lost in more derived members of the group. In 2004, Makovicky, Kobayashi, and Currie suggested that most of the early evolutionary history of ornithomimosaurs took place in Asia, where most genera have been discovered, including the most basal (or "primitive") taxa, although they acknowledged that the presence of the basal Pelecanimimus in Europe presents a complication in classification. The group must have dispersed once or twice from Asia to North America across Beringia to account for the Late Cretaceous genera found there. As seen in some other dinosaur groups, ornithomimosaurs were largely restricted to Asia and North America after Europe was separated from Asia by the Turgai Strait.

In 1994, the palaeontologist Thomas R. Holtz grouped ornithomimosaurs and troodontids in a clade, based on shared features such as the presence of a bulbous capsule on the parasphenoid. He named the clade Bullatosauria, based on the specific name of Gallimimus bullatus, which was also in reference to the capsule. In 1998, Holtz instead found that troodontids were basal maniraptorans, meaning that all members of that clade would fall within Bullatosauria, which would therefore become a junior synonym of Maniraptoriformes, and the clade has since fallen out of use.

== Palaeobiology ==
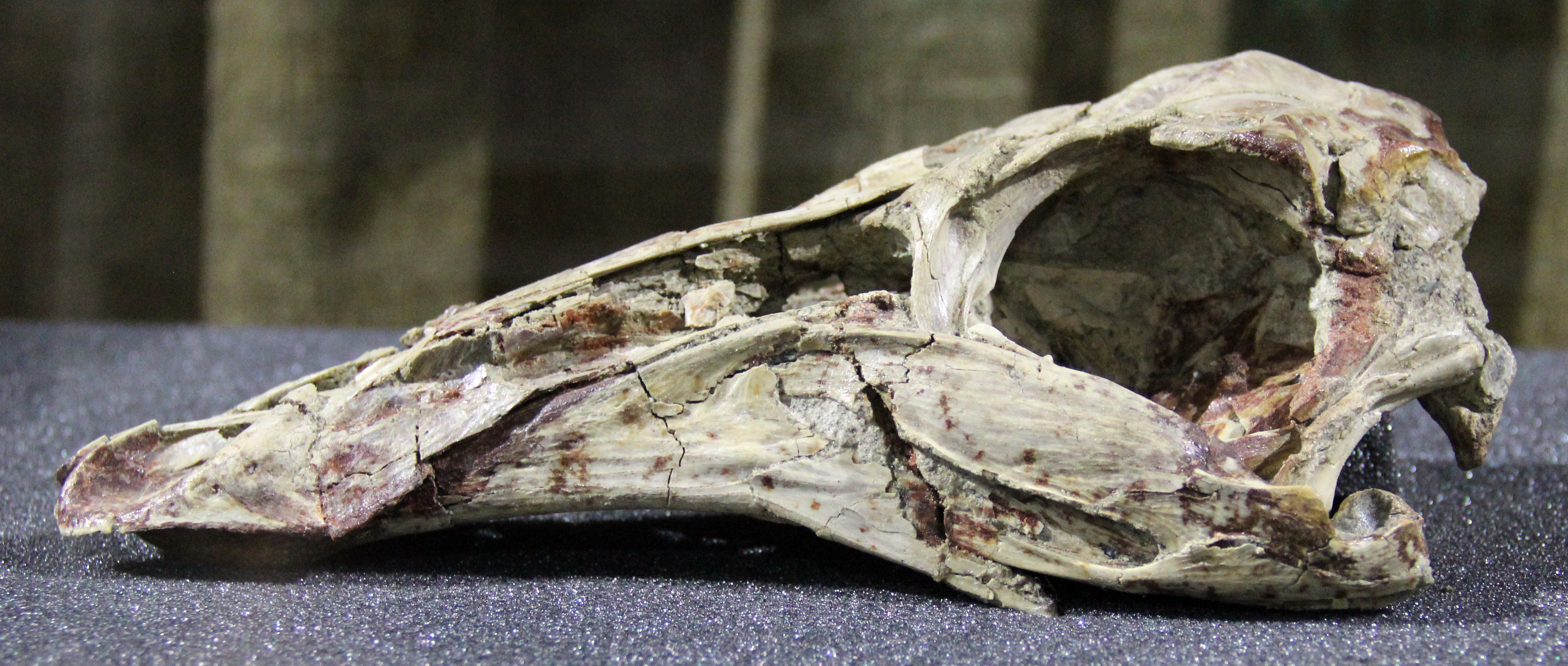
Skull in Central Museum of Dinosaurs of Mongolia

The cervical vertebrae of Gallimimus indicate that it held its neck obliquely, declining upwards at an angle of 35 degrees. Osmólska and colleagues found that the hands of Gallimimus were not prehensile (or capable of grasping), and that the thumb was not opposable. They also suggested that the arms were weak compared to, for example, those of the ornithomimosaur Deinocheirus. They agreed with the interpretations of ornithomimid biology by palaeontologist Dale Russell from earlier in 1972, including that they would have been very fleet (or cursorial) animals, although less agile than large, modern ground birds, and would have used their speed to escape predators. Russell also suggested that they had a good sense of vision and intelligence comparable to that of modern ratite birds. Since their predators may have had colour vision, he suggested it would have influenced their colouration, perhaps resulting in camouflage. In 1982, palaeontologist Richard A. Thulborn estimated that Gallimimus could have run at speeds of 42–56 km/h (29–34 mph). He found that ornithomimids would not have been as fast as ostriches, which can reach 70–80 km/h (43–49 mph), in part due to their arms and tails increasing their weight.

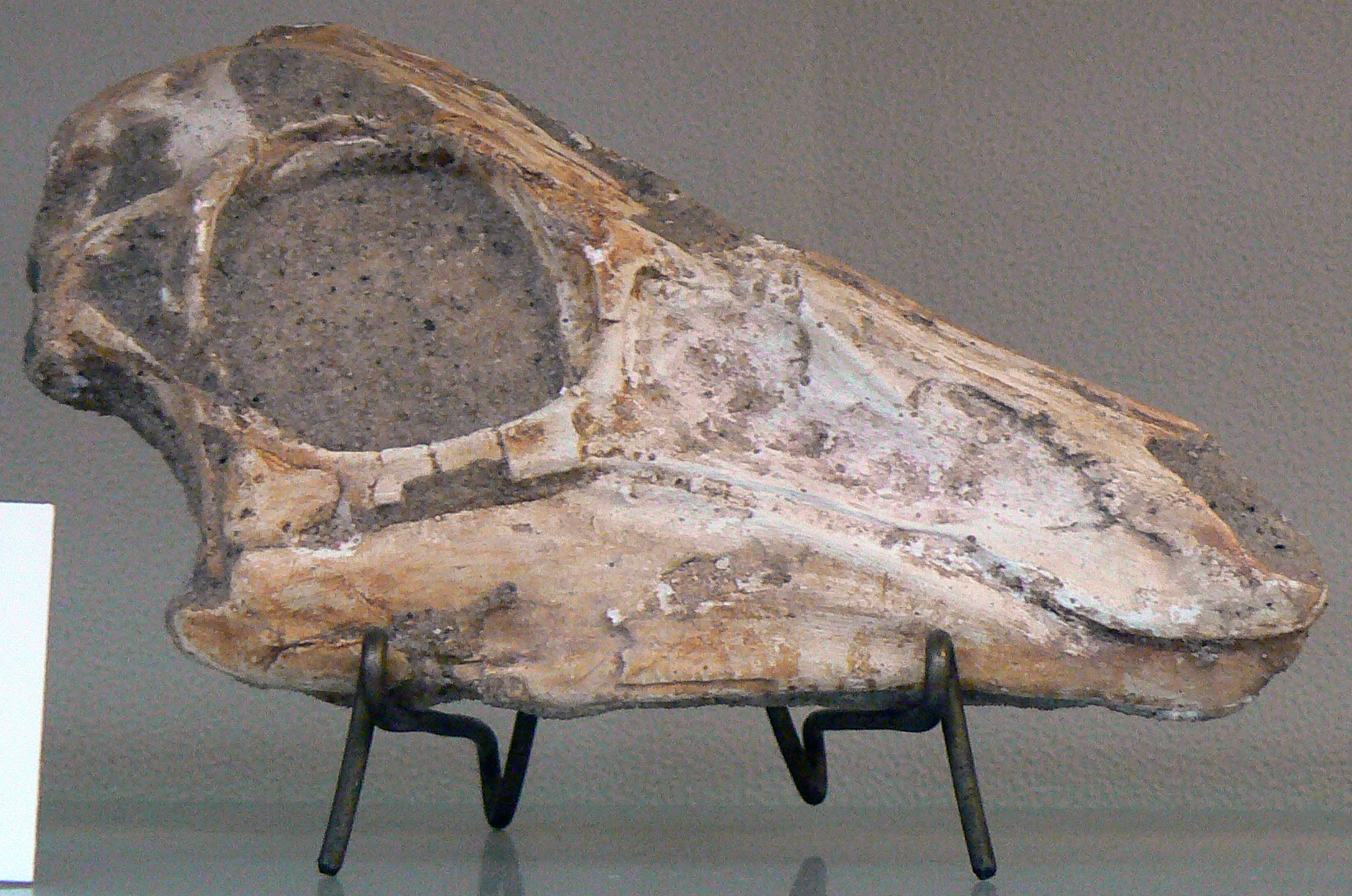
Skull cast of the juvenile specimen ZPAL MgD-I/1, National Museum of Natural History

In 1988, Paul suggested that the eyeballs of ornithomimids were flattened and had minimal mobility within the sockets, necessitating movement of the head to view objects. Since their eyes faced more sideways than in some other bird-like theropods, their binocular vision would have been more limited, which is an adaptation in some animals that improves their ability to see predators behind them. Paul considered the relatively short tails, which reduced weight, and missing halluxes of ornithomimids to be adaptations for speed. He suggested that they could have defended themselves by pecking and kicking, but would have mainly relied on their speed for escape. In 2015, Akinobu Watanabe and colleagues found that together with Deinocheirus and Archaeornithomimus, Gallimimus had the most pneumatised skeleton among ornithomimosaurs. Pneumatisation is thought to be advantageous for flight in modern birds, but its function in non-avian dinosaurs is not known with certainty. It has been proposed that pneumatisation was used to reduce the mass of large bones, that it was related to high metabolism, balance during locomotion, or used for thermoregulation.

In 2017, Lee and colleagues suggested various possible taphonomic circumstances (changes during decay and fossilisation) to explain how the Gallimimus foot discovered in 2009 was associated with a trackway. The trackway is preserved in sandstone while the foot is preserved in mudstone, extending 20 centimetres (7.9 in) below the layer with the tracks. It is possible the fossil represents an animal that died in its tracks, but the depth of the foot in the mud may be too shallow for it to have become mired. It may also have been killed by a flood, after which it was buried in a pond. However, the layers of mud and sand do not indicate flooding but probably a dry environment, and the disrupted sediments around the fossil indicate the animal was alive when it came to the area. The authors thus suggested that the tracks had been made over an extended amount of time and period of drying, and that probably none of them were produced by the individual that owned the foot. The animal may have walked across the floor of a pond, breaking through the sediment layer with the tracks while it was soaked from rain or contained water. The animal may have died in this position from thirst, hunger, or another reason, and mud then deposited on the sand, thereby covering and preserving the tracks and the carcass. The foot may have become clenched and disarticulated as it decomposed, which made the tendons flex, and was later stepped on by heavy dinosaurs. The area may have been a single bone bed (based on the possible number of poached specimens) representing a Gallimimus mass mortality, perhaps due to a drought or famine. The fact that the animals seem to have died at the same time (the empty excavation pits were stratigraphically identical) may indicate that Gallimimus was gregarious (lived in groups), which has also been suggested for other ornithomimids.

=== Feeding and diet ===
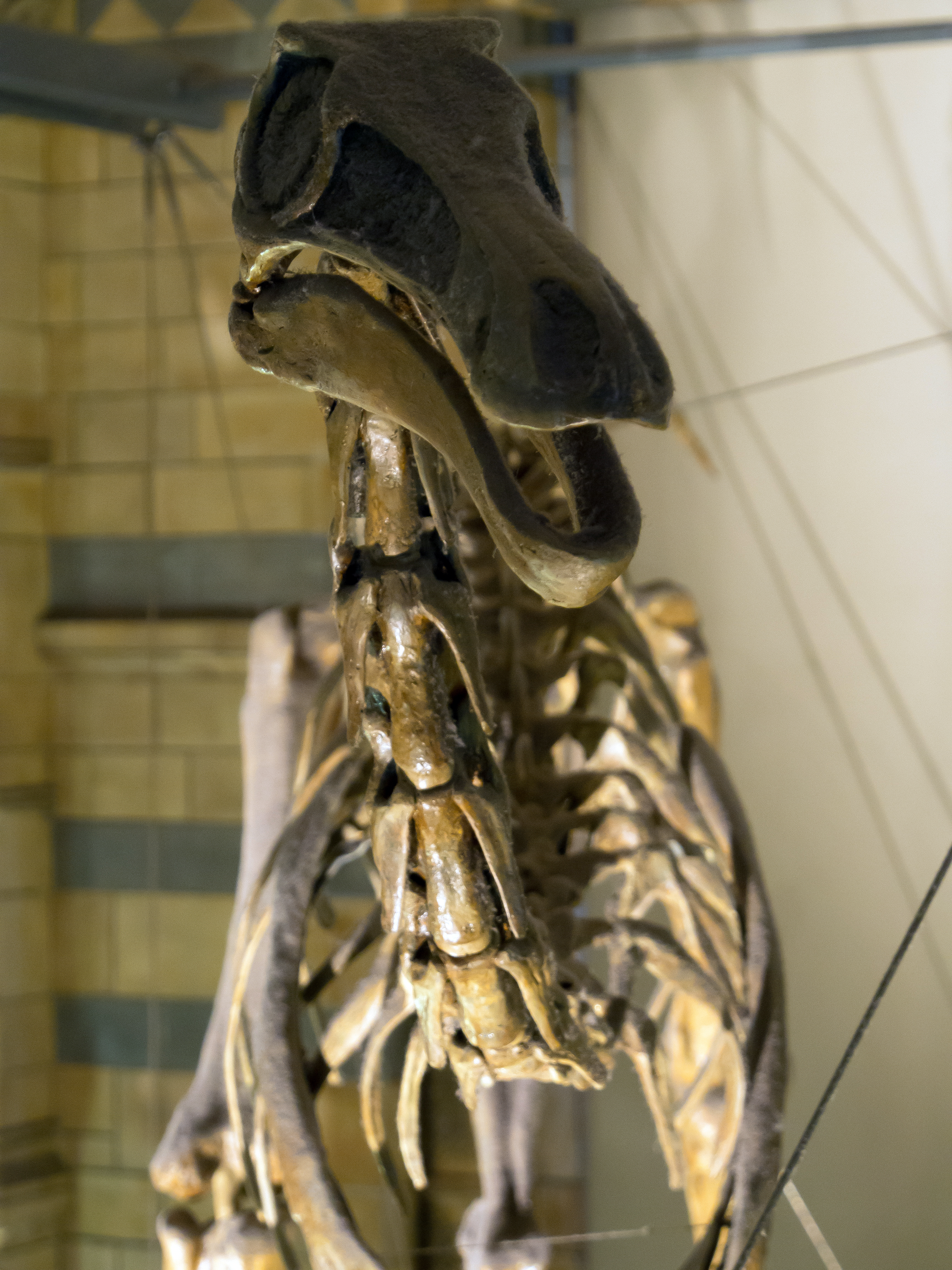
Reconstructed skull and neck in front view, NHM

Osmólska and colleagues pointed out that the front part of the neck of Gallimimus would have been very mobile (the hind part was more rigid), the neural arches in the vertebrae of that region being similar to chicken and other Galliformes, indicating similar feeding habits. They found the beak of Gallimimus similar to that of a duck or goose, and that it would have fed on small, living prey which it swallowed whole. The mobility of the neck would have been useful in locating prey on the ground, since the eyes were positioned on the sides of the skull. They assumed that all ornithomimids had similar feeding habits, and pointed out that Russel had compared the beaks of ornithomimids with those of insectivorous birds. Osmólska and colleagues suggested that Gallimimus was capable of cranial kinesis (due to the seemingly loose connection between some of the bones at the back of the skull), a feature which allows individual bones of the skull to move in relation to each other. They also proposed that it did not use its short handed forelimbs for bringing food to the mouth, but for raking or digging in the ground to access food. The hands of Gallimimus may have been weaker than for example those of Struthiomimus, which may instead have used its hands for hooking and gripping, according to a 1985 article by palaeontologists Elizabeth L. Nicholls and Anthony P. Russell.

In 1988 Paul disagreed that ornithomimids were omnivores that ate small animals and eggs as well as plants, as had previously been suggested. He pointed out that ostriches and emus are mainly grazers and browsers, and that the skulls of ornithomimids were most similar to those of the extinct moas, which were strong enough to bite off twigs, as evidenced by their gut content. He further suggested that ornithomimids were well adapted for browsing on tough plants and would have used their hands to bring branches within reach of their jaws. Palaeontologist Jørn Hurum suggested in 2001 that due to its similar jaw structure, Gallimimus may have had an opportunistic, omnivorous diet like seagulls. He also observed that the tight intramandibular joint would prevent any movement between the front and rear portions of the lower jaw.

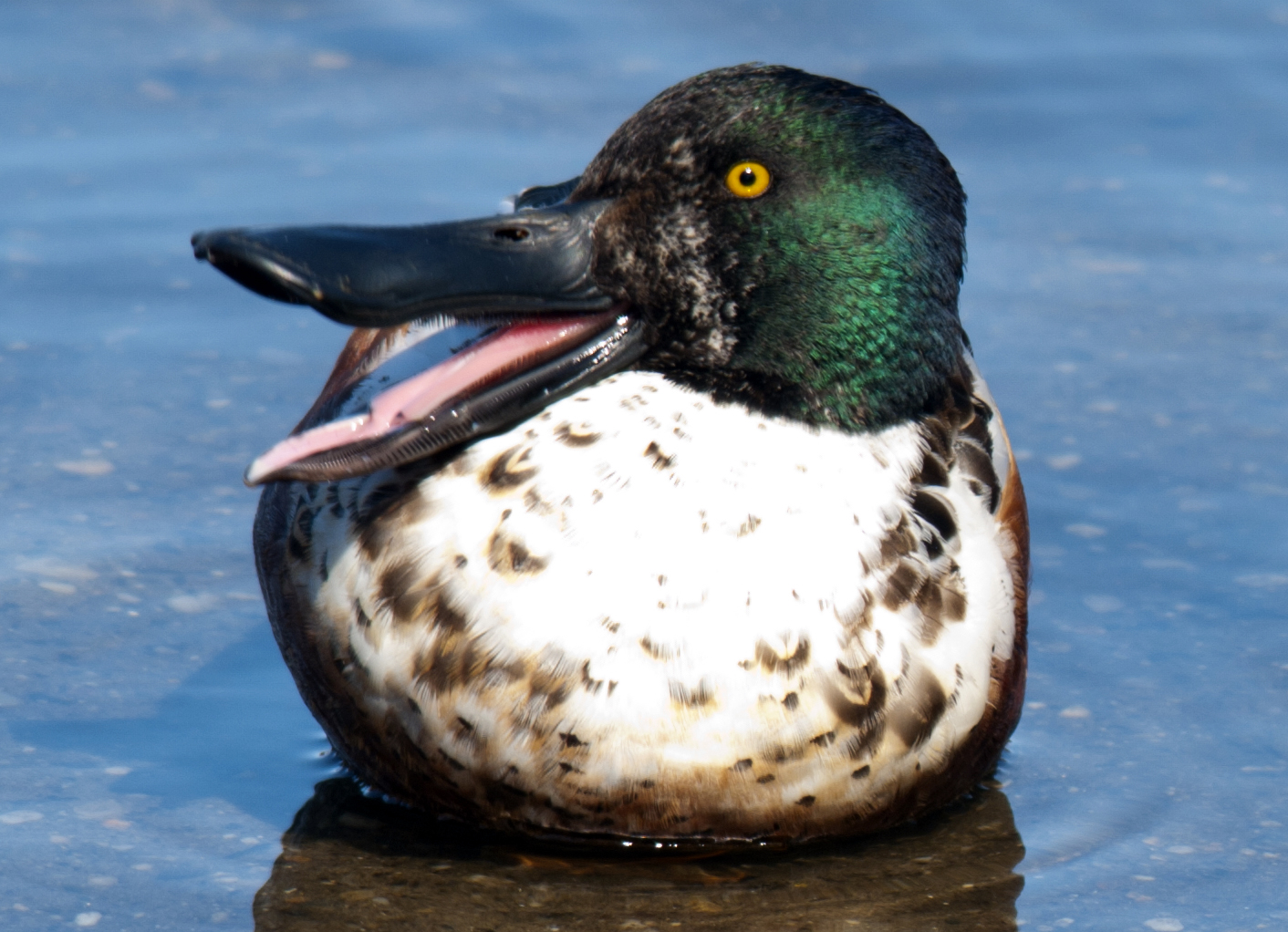
The beak of Gallimimus contained structures which have been compared to the lamellae of, for example, the Northern shoveller, or the ridges in the beaks of turtles and hadrosaurids.

In 2001, palaeontologists Mark A. Norell, Makovicky, and Currie reported a Gallimimus skull (IGM 100/1133) and an Ornithomimus skull that preserved soft tissue structures on the beak. The inner side of the Gallimimus beak had columnar structures that the authors found similar to the lamellae in the beaks of anseriform birds, which use these for manipulating food, straining sediments, filter-feeding by segregating food items from other material, and for cutting plants while grazing. They found the Northern shoveller, which feeds on plants, molluscs, ostracods, and foraminiferans, to be the modern anseriform with structures most similar in anatomy to those of Gallimimus. The authors noted that ornithomimids probably did not use their beaks to prey on large animals and were abundant in mesic environments, while rarer in more arid environments, suggesting that they may have depended on aquatic food sources. Makovicky, Kobayashi, and Currie pointed out that if this interpretation is correct, Gallimimus would have been one of the largest known terrestrial filter feeders.

In 2005, palaeontologist Paul Barrett pointed out that the lamella-like structures of Gallimimus did not appear to have been flexible bristles like those of filter-feeding birds (as there is no indication of these structures overlapping or being collapsed), but were instead more akin to the thin, regularly spaced vertical ridges in the beaks of turtles and hadrosaurid dinosaurs. In these animals, such ridges are thought to be associated with herbivorous diets, used to crop tough vegetation. Barrett suggested that the ridges in the beak of Gallimimus represented a natural cast of the internal surface of the beak, indicating that the animal was a herbivore that fed on material high in fibre. The discovery of many gastroliths (gizzard stones) in some ornithomimids indicate the presence of a gastric mill, and therefore point towards a herbivorous diet, as these are used to grind food of animals that lack the necessary chewing apparatus. Barrett also calculated that a 440 kilograms (970 lb) Gallimimus would have needed between 0.07 and 3.34 kilograms (0.15 and 7.36 lb) of food per day, depending on whether it had an endothermic or an ectothermic ("warm" or "cold"-blooded) metabolism, an intake which he found to be unfeasible if it was a filter feeder. He also found that ornithomimids were abundant not only in formations that represented mesic environments, but also in arid environments where there would be insufficient water to sustain a diet based on filter-feeding. In 2007, palaeontologist Espen M. Knutsen wrote that the beak shape of ornithomimids, when compared to those of modern birds, was consistent with omnivory or high-fibre herbivory.

David J. Button and Zanno found in 2019 herbivorous dinosaurs mainly followed two distinct modes of feeding, either processing food in the gut—characterized by gracile skulls and low bite forces—or the mouth, characterized by features associated with extensive processing. Ornithomimid ornithomimosaurs, Deinocheirus, diplodocoid and titanosaur sauropods, Segnosaurus, and caenagnathids, were found to be in the former category. These researchers suggested that ornithomimid ornithomimosaurians such as Gallimimus and deinocheirids had invaded these niches separately, convergently achieving relatively large sizes. Advantages from large body mass in herbivores include increased intake rate of food and fasting resistance, and these trends may therefore indicate that ornithomimids and deinocheirids were more herbivorous than other ornithomimosaurians. They cautioned that the correlations between herbivory and body mass were not simple, and that there was no directional trend towards increased mass seen in the clade. Furthermore, the diet of most ornithomimosaurians is poorly known.

=== Development ===
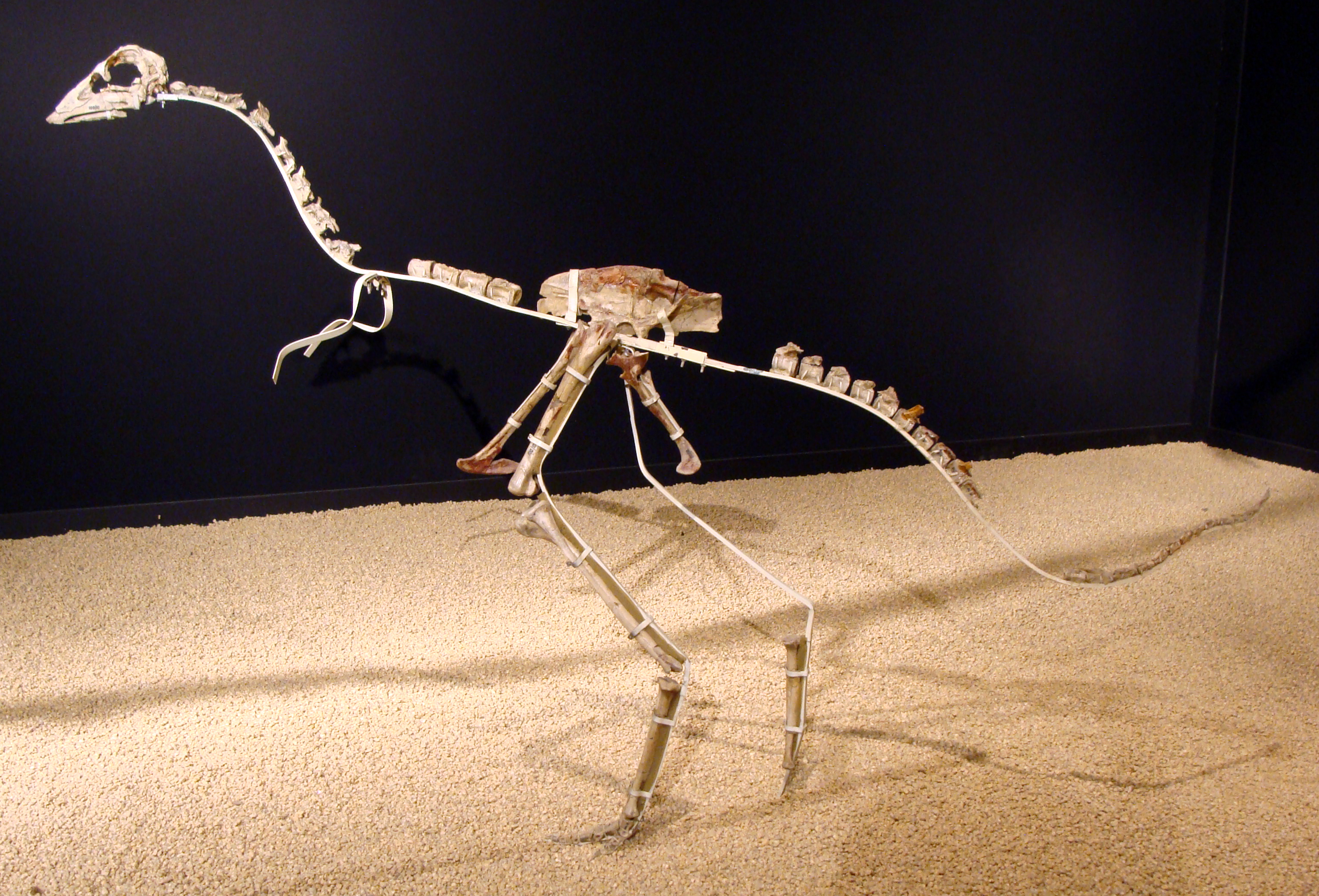
Smallest known Gallimimus, the juvenile specimen IGM 100/10, exhibited in CosmoCaixa

The shape and proportions of the skull changed significantly during growth. The rear of the skull and the orbits decreased in size, whereas the snout became relatively longer; similar changes occur in modern crocodiles. The skull was also proportionally larger in the younger specimens, and the sloping of the snout's upper profile was less distinct. The ribs in the neck were fused to the vertebrae only in adults. The forelimbs appear to have become proportionally longer during growth, whereas the proportional length of the bones in the hind limbs changed very little. In 2012, palaeontologist Darla K. Zelenitsky and colleagues concluded that, since adult ornithomimosaurs had wing-like structures on their arms whereas juveniles did not (as evidenced by specimens of Ornithomimus), these structures were originally secondary sexual characteristics, which could have been used for reproductive behaviour such as courtship, display, and brooding.

A 1987 study by the biologists Roman Pawlicki and P. Bolechała showed age-related differences in the content of calcium and phosphorus (important components in the formation of bone) of Gallimimus specimens. They found that the ratio was highest in young to middle aged animals, decreasing with age. In 1991, they reported that the bones of old individuals contained the highest amounts of lead and iron, while those in younger animals were lower. A study of the bone histology of various dinosaurs in 2000, by biologists John M. Rensberger and Mahito Watabe, revealed that the canaliculi (channels which connect bone cells) and collagen fibre bundles of Gallimimus and other ornithomimids were more akin to those in birds than mammals, unlike those of ornithischian dinosaurs, which were more similar to mammals. These differences may have been related to the process and rate at which bone formed.

== Palaeoenvironment ==
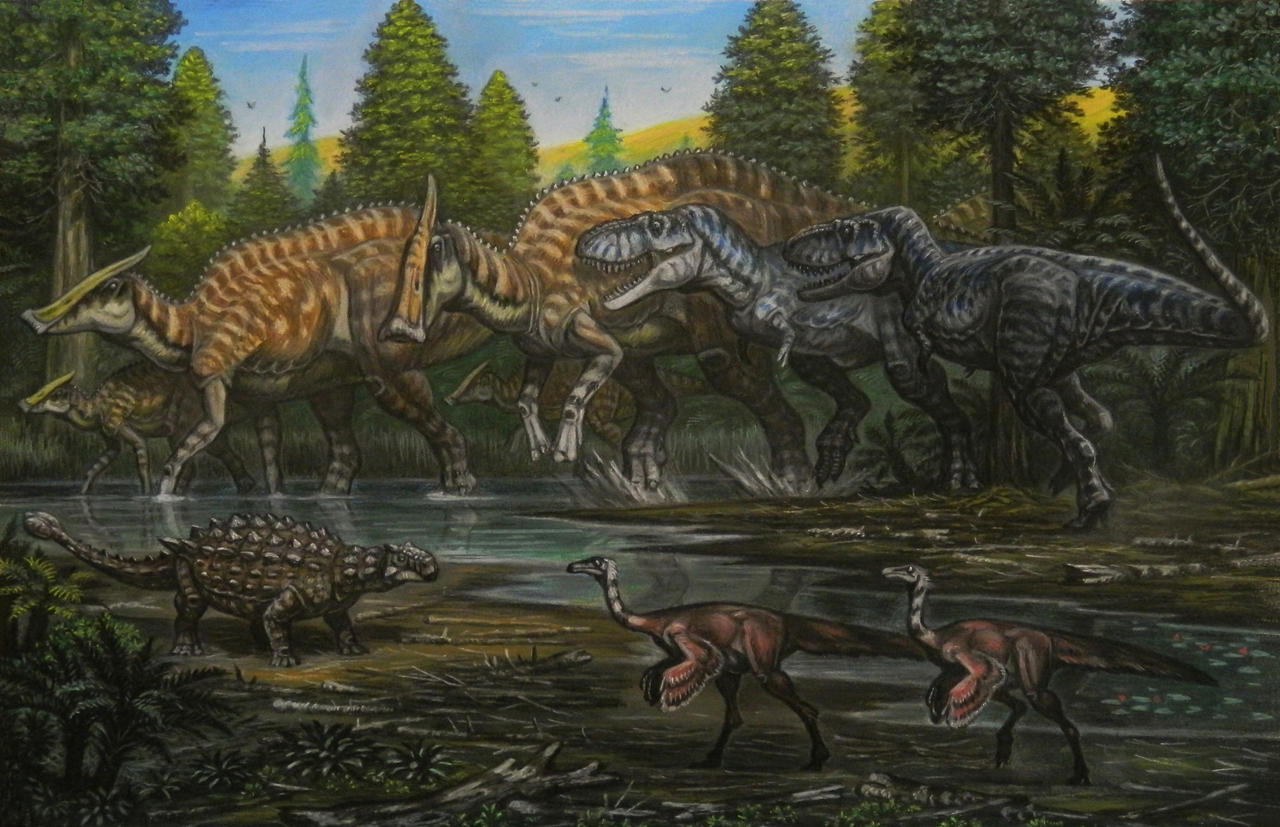
Two Gallimimus (right foreground) with contemporary dinosaurs of the Nemegt Formation

Gallimimus is known from the Nemegt Formation in the Gobi Desert of southern Mongolia. This geologic formation has never been dated radiometrically, but the fauna present in the fossil record indicate it was probably deposited during the early Maastrichtian stage, at the end of the Late Cretaceous about 70 million years ago. The sediments of the Gallimimus type locality Tsaagan Khushuu consist of silts, siltstones, mudstones, sands, as well as less frequent thin beds of sandstones. The rock facies of the Nemegt Formation suggest the presence of river channels, mudflats, shallow lakes and floodplains in an environment similar to the Okavango Delta of present-day Botswana. Large river channels and soil deposits are evidence of a significantly more humid climate than those found in the older Barun Goyot and Djadochta formations, although caliche deposits indicate that periodic droughts occurred. Fossil bones from the Nemegt Basin, including of Gallimimus, are more radioactive than fossils from surrounding areas, possibly because uranium accumulated in the bones, transported there by percolating ground water.

The Nemegt rivers, where Gallimimus lived, were home to a wide array of organisms. Occasional mollusc fossils, as well as a variety of other aquatic animals like fish, turtles, and crocodylomorphs, including Shamosuchus, have been discovered in this region. Mammal fossils are rare in the Nemegt Formation, but many birds, including the enantiornithine Gurilynia, the hesperornithiform Judinornis, as well as Teviornis, a possible anseriform, have been found. Herbivorous dinosaurs discovered in the Nemegt Formation include ankylosaurids such as Tarchia, the pachycephalosaurian Prenocephale, large hadrosaurids such as Saurolophus and Barsboldia, and sauropods such as Nemegtosaurus and Opisthocoelicaudia. Predatory theropods that lived alongside Gallimimus include tyrannosauroids such as Tarbosaurus, Alioramus and Bagaraatan, and troodontids such as Borogovia, Tochisaurus and Zanabazar. Herbivorous or omnivorous theropods include therizinosaurs, such as Therizinosaurus, as well as oviraptorosaurians, such as Elmisaurus, Nemegtomaia, and Rinchenia. Other ornithomimosaurs, including Anserimimus and Deinocheirus, are also found, but Gallimimus is the most common member of the group in the Nemegt.

== Cultural significance ==
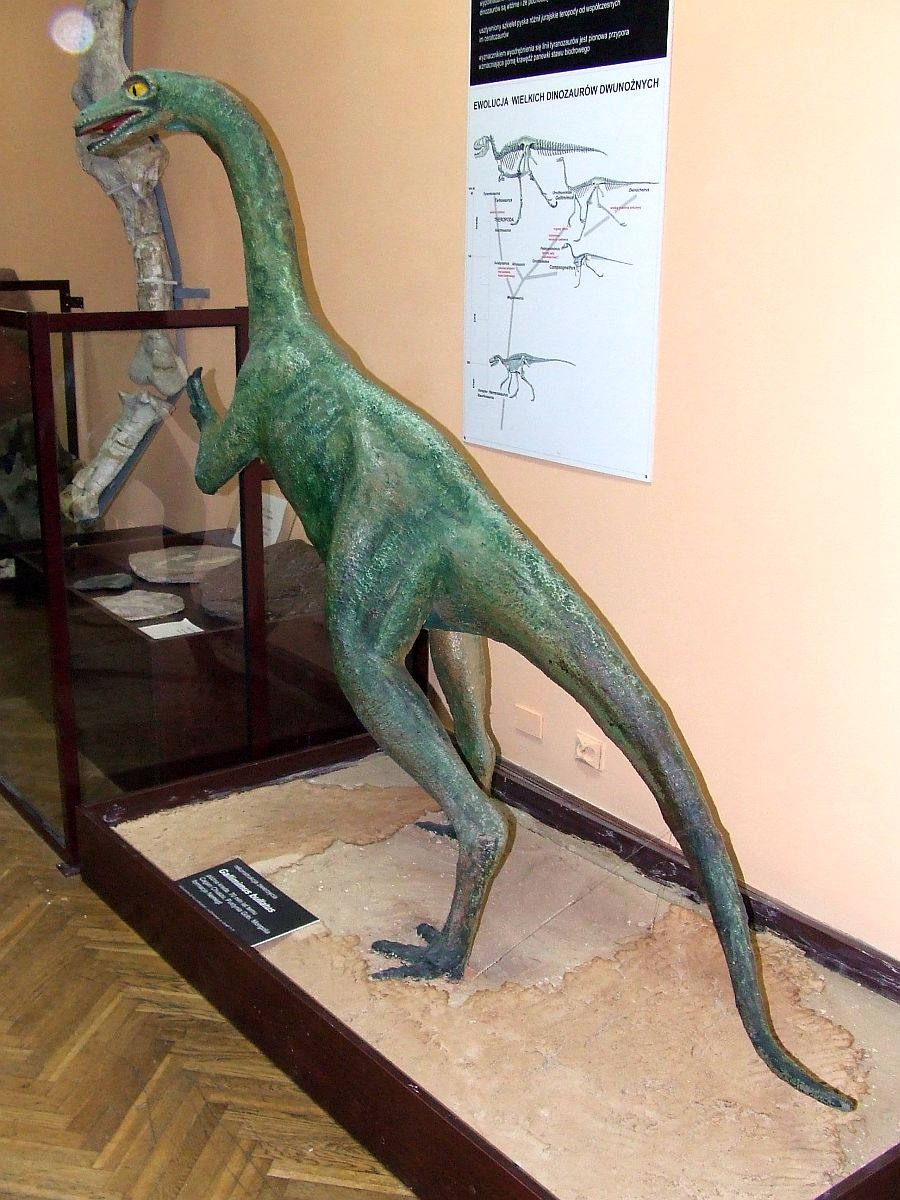
Gallimimus was formerly depicted without feathers, like this model in MEPAS.

Gallimimus was featured in the 1993 movie Jurassic Park by director Steven Spielberg; a similar scene in the original 1990 novel instead featured hadrosaurs. Spielberg had wanted a stampede sequence with animal herds in the movie, but did not know how to achieve it, and it was initially going to be visualised through stop-motion animation. At the time, there was little faith in creating animals through computer animation, but the visual effects company Industrial Light and Magic was given a go-ahead by the movie's producers to explore possibilities. ILM created a Gallimimus skeleton in the computer and animated a test showing a herd of running skeletons, and later a Tyrannosaurus chasing a fully rendered Gallimimus herd.

The production team became very enthusiastic as nothing similar had previously been achieved, and Spielberg was convinced to write the scene into the script, and to also use computer graphics for other dinosaur shots in the movie instead of stop motion. The Gallimimus were animated by tracing frames from footage of ostriches, and footage of herding gazelles was also referenced. Kielan-Jaworowska, who discovered the holotype specimen, called it a "beautiful scene". The movie's dinosaurs were one of the most widely publicised applications of computer-generated imagery in film, and were considered more lifelike than what had been previously accomplished with special effects.

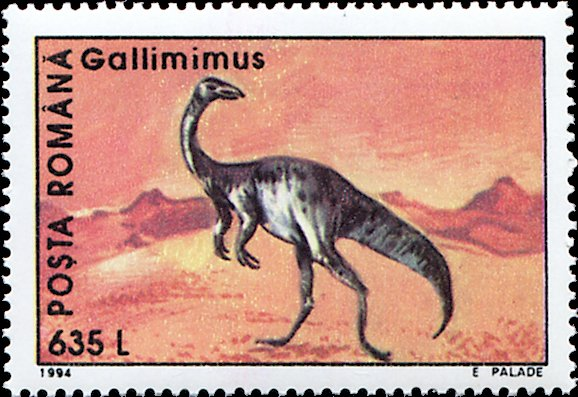
1994 stamp from Romania showing Gallimimus without feathers

Emphasising the bird-like flocking behaviour of the Gallimimus herd was a point in Jurassic Park's story, as they were supposed to represent the precursors to birds. The herd was shown moving as a whole, rather than individual animals running around, and the smaller Gallimimus were shown in the middle of the group, as though they were being protected. During the scene, the palaeontologist Alan Grant says that the herd moves with "uniform direction changes, just like a flock of birds evading a predator" as he watches the movements of the fast, graceful Gallimimus. This contrasted with how dinosaurs were traditionally depicted in mass media as lumbering, tail-dragging animals, and the movie helped change the common perception of dinosaurs. This and other scenes reflected then-recent theories of bird evolution encouraged by the movie's scientific advisor, the palaeontologist John R. Horner, ideas which were still contentious at the time. Despite such theories, Gallimimus and other dinosaurs of the movie were depicted without feathers, in part because it was unknown at the time how widespread these were among the group.

It has been claimed that the Lark Quarry tracks (one of the world's largest concentrations of dinosaur tracks) in Queensland, Australia, served as inspiration and "scientific underpinning" for the Gallimimus stampede scene in Jurassic Park; these tracks were initially interpreted as representing a dinosaur stampede caused by the arrival of a theropod predator. The idea that the tracks represent a stampede has since been contested (the "theropod" may instead have been a herbivore similar to Muttaburrasaurus), and a consultant to Jurassic Park has denied the tracks served as inspiration for the movie.

== See also ==
- Timeline of ornithomimosaur research
