= Mongolian Natural History Museum =

Museum in Chingeltei, Ulaanbaatar, Mongolia

Natural History Museum
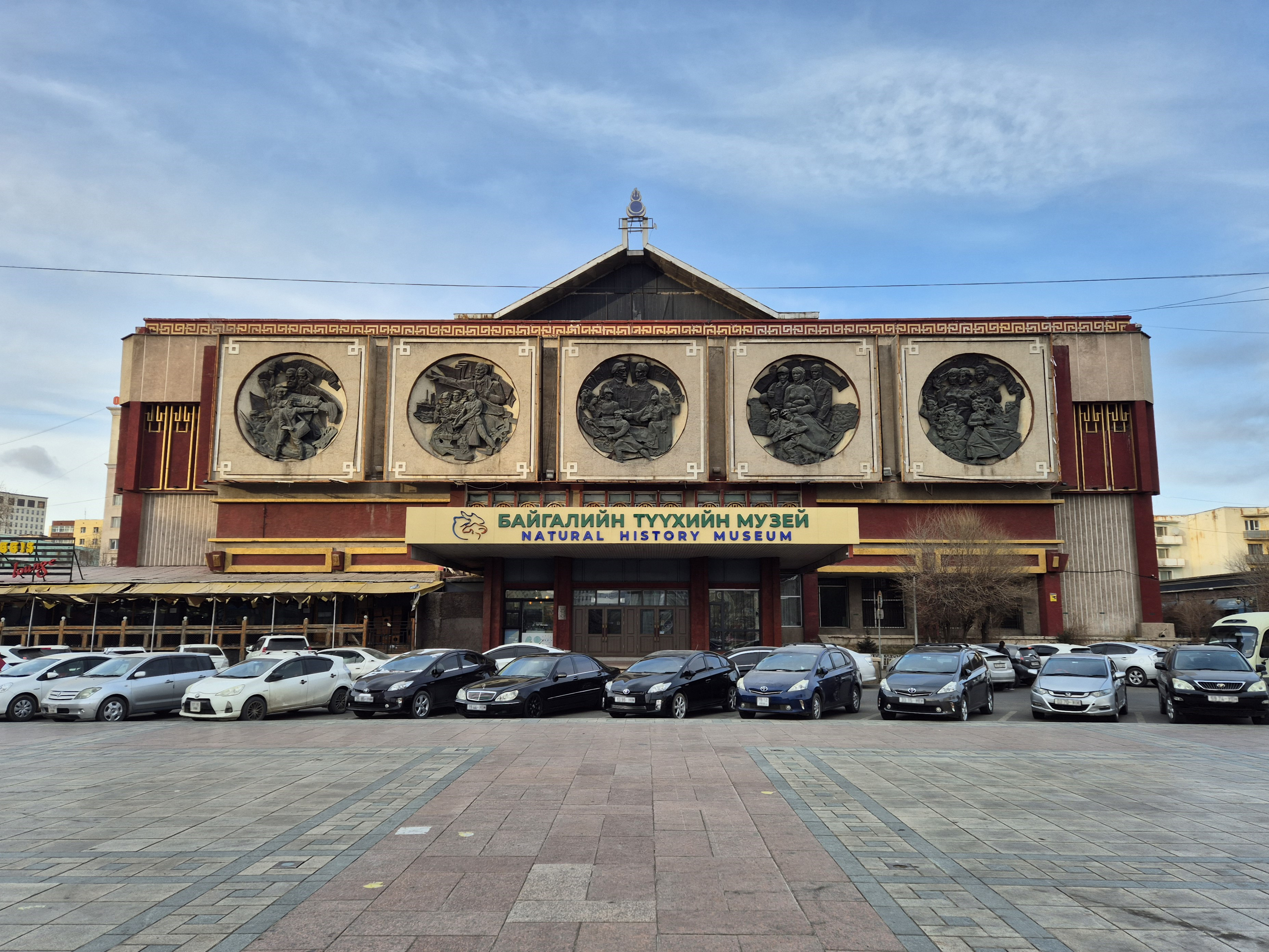
- Established: 1924 (as the National Museum)
- Dissolved: 2019
- Location: Chingeltei, Ulaanbaatar, Mongolia
- Coordinates: 47°55′24.6″N 106°54′20.8″E
- Type: Natural History
- Visitors: ca. 80,000 annually
- Website: nhm.gov.mn

The Natural History Museum (Mongolian: Байгалийн түүхийн музей, romanized: Baigaliin tüükhiin muzyei) is a repository and research institution located in Chingeltei, Ulaanbaatar, Mongolia. The museum was previously known as the Mongolian National Museum or State Central Museum.

The museum includes Departments of Geology, Geography, Flora and Fauna, Paleontology, and Anthropology encompassing the natural history of Mongolia. The museum's holdings include more than 15000 specimens, 45% of which were on permanent public display.

The museum is particularly well known for its dinosaur and other paleontological exhibits, among which the most notable are a nearly complete skeleton of a late Cretaceous Tarbosaurus tyrannosaurid and broadly contemporaneous nests of Protoceratops eggs.

== History ==
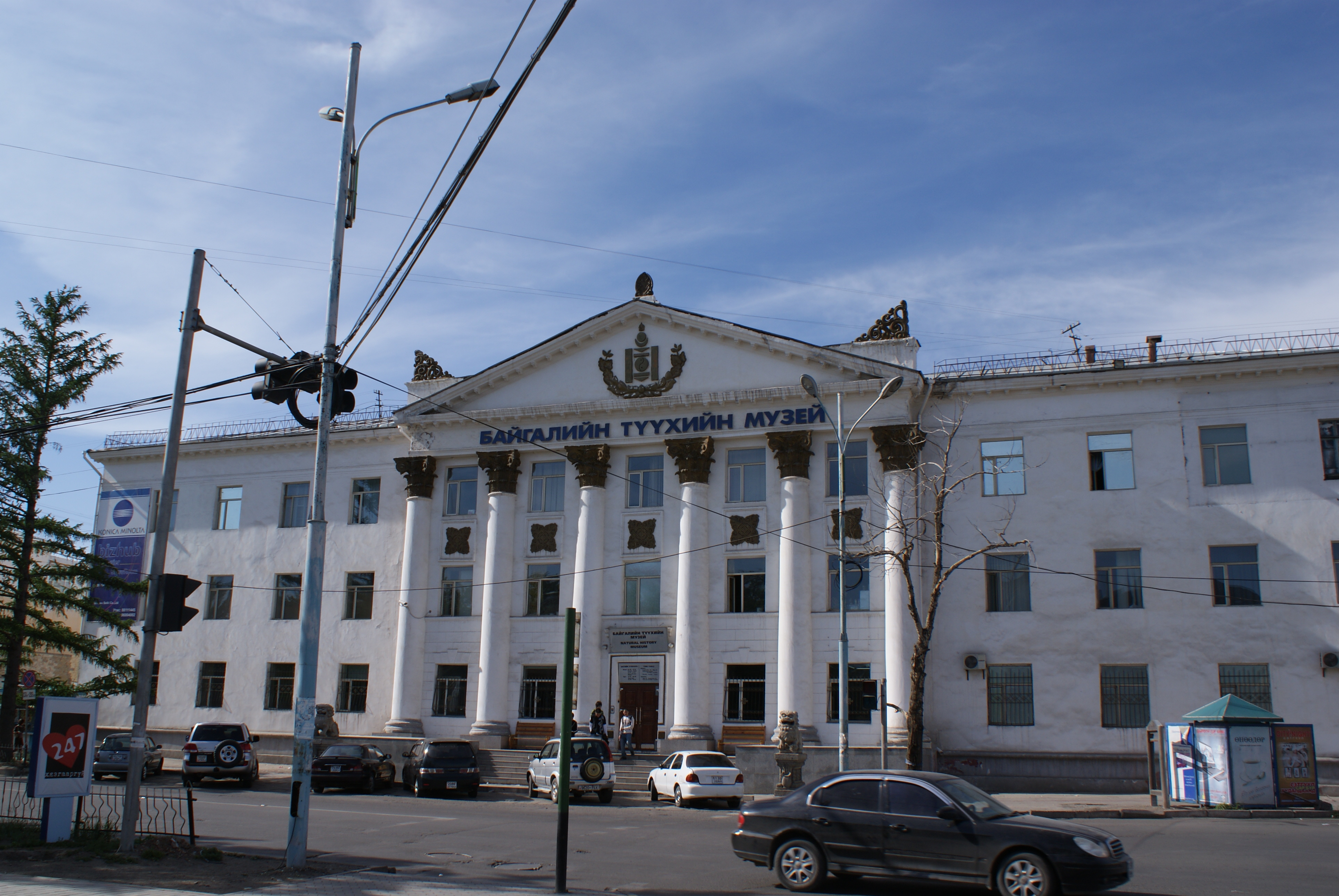
Original building, 1953–2019

The museum was established in 1924 as the National Museum (Mongolian: Үндэсний музей). In 1940–1941, it became known as the Rural Research Museum (Mongolian: Орон нутаг судлах музей) and in 1956 as the State Central Museum (Mongolian: Улсын төв музей). It received its current designation after 1991.

Authorities deemed the museum's 1953 building to be highly susceptible to natural disasters such as earthquakes in a study made in 2013. The museum was closed in June 2013, with its exhibits put into storage or displayed at other venues. Initial plans were for the museum to be housed in a brand new building on its original site.

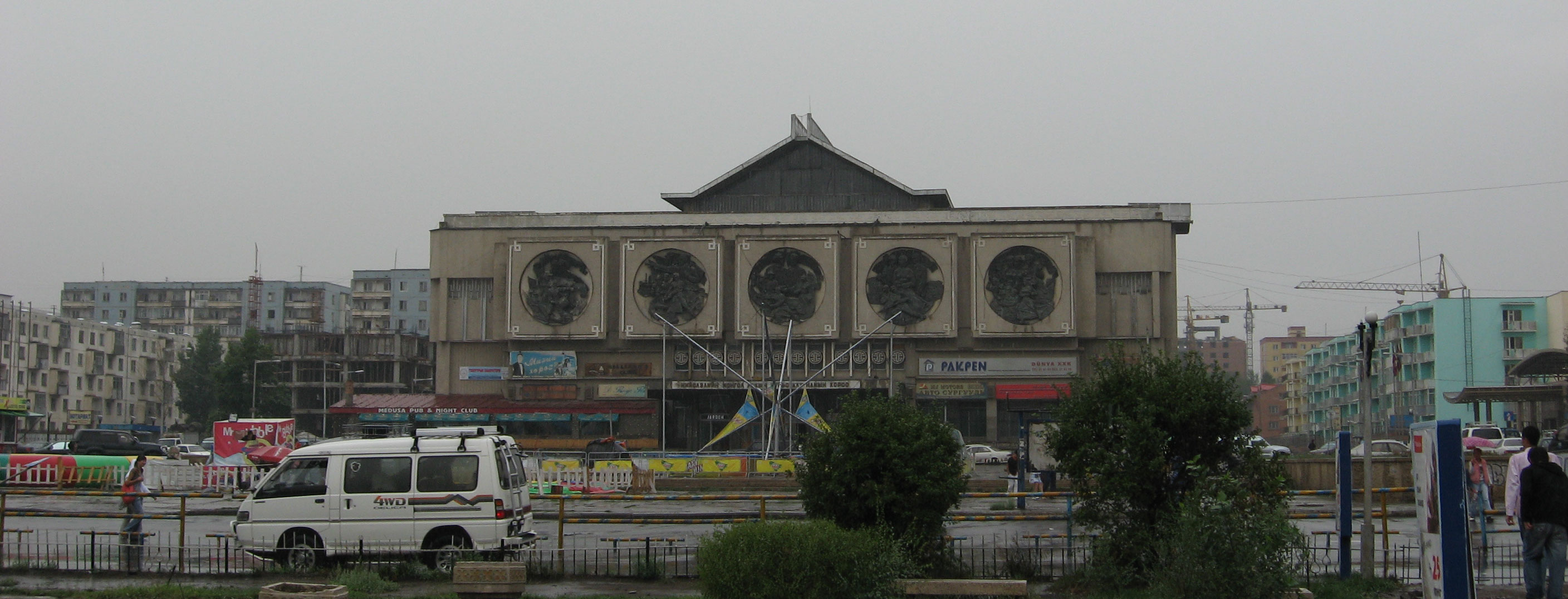
Lenin Museum before the reconstruction (2008)

The museum building fell into disrepair in the following years, and was eventually demolished, despite public anger at night around 2 a.m. on 7 December 2019. The Chinggis Khaan National Museum, which opened in 2022, was built on the original site.

The museum was officially merged with the Central Museum of Dinosaurs of Mongolia in 2019, and today continues its operations in the former Lenin Museum building in Ulaanbaatar.

=== Name ===
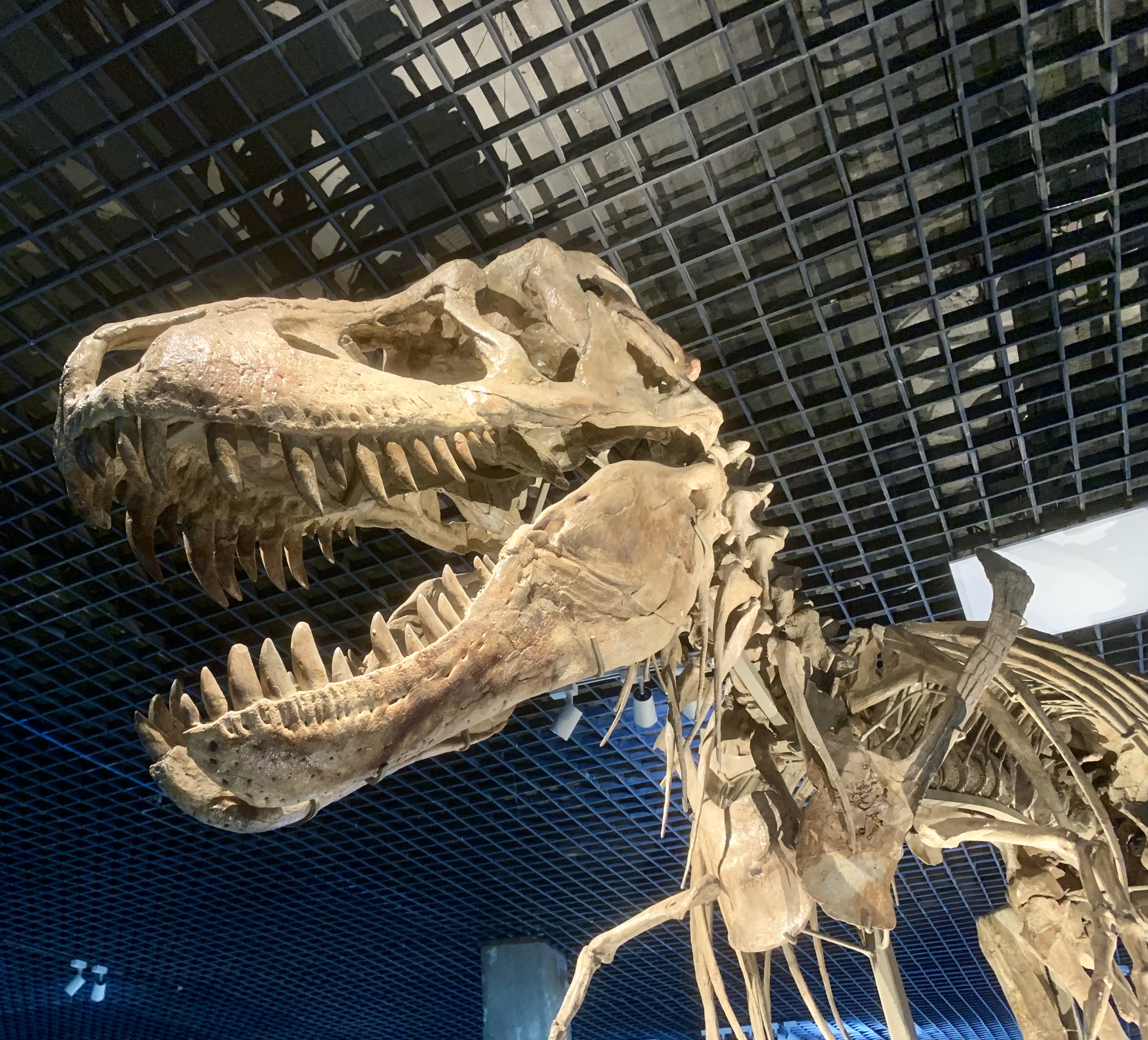
Tarbosaurus bataar skeleton

The museum was previously known as the Mongolian National Museum or State Central Museum. This change in name often led to confusion with Ulaanbaatar's other preeminent museum, the National Museum of Mongolia. Although the two museums used to be located quite close to one another, they contain very different exhibits. The National Museum of Mongolia focuses on the archaeology and history of Mongolia, while the Mongolian Natural History Museum is concerned primarily with the flora, fauna, geology and natural history of the country.
