= Chinggis Khaan National Museum =

Museum in Chingeltei, Ulaanbaatar, Mongolia

- Чингис хаан Үндэсний музей
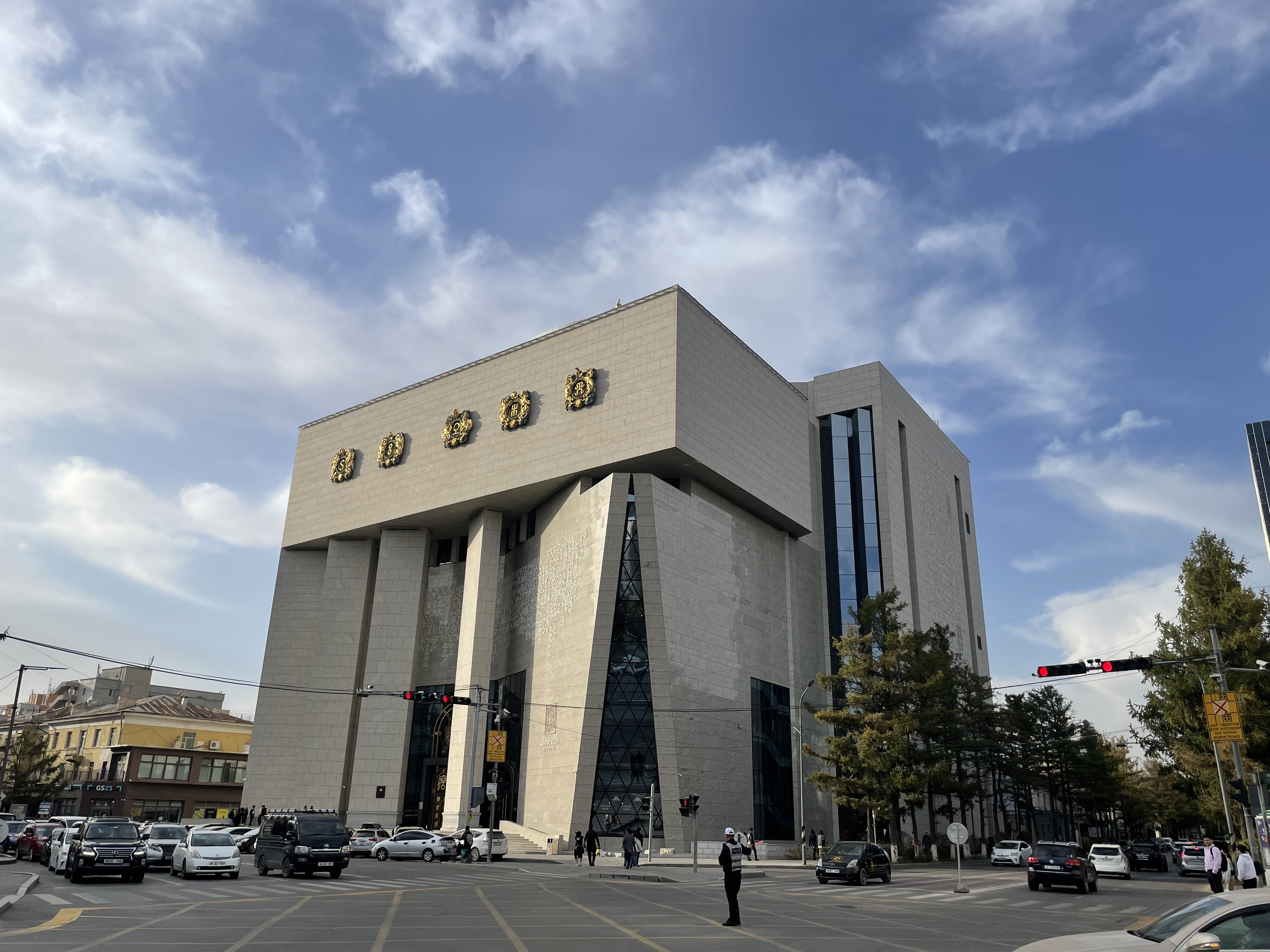
- Museum from the south, 2025
- Established: October 2022
- Location: Chingeltei, Ulaanbaatar, Mongolia
- Coordinates: 47°55′21.1″N 106°54′53.7″E
- Type: museum
- Website: Official website

The Chinggis Khaan National Museum (Mongolian: Чингис хаан Үндэсний музей) is a museum about Genghis Khan in Chingeltei, Ulaanbaatar, Mongolia.

== History ==
The groundbreaking of the museum was held in 2020 at the site where the old building of the Mongolian Natural History Museum used to stand. The museum was opened in October 2022. On 29 December 2023, the museum opened its research library. On 30 January 2024, the museum was featured as one of the 20 cultural hotspots to visit in 2024 by Best of the World of National Geographic. On 13 December 2024, a laboratory to preserve and restore artifacts was inaugurated.

== Architecture ==
The museum is housed in a 9-story building. The main gate of the museum resembles a Paiza and the top part resembles a yurt. The museum also houses a research library with a collection of more than 6,000 volumes.

== Exhibitions ==
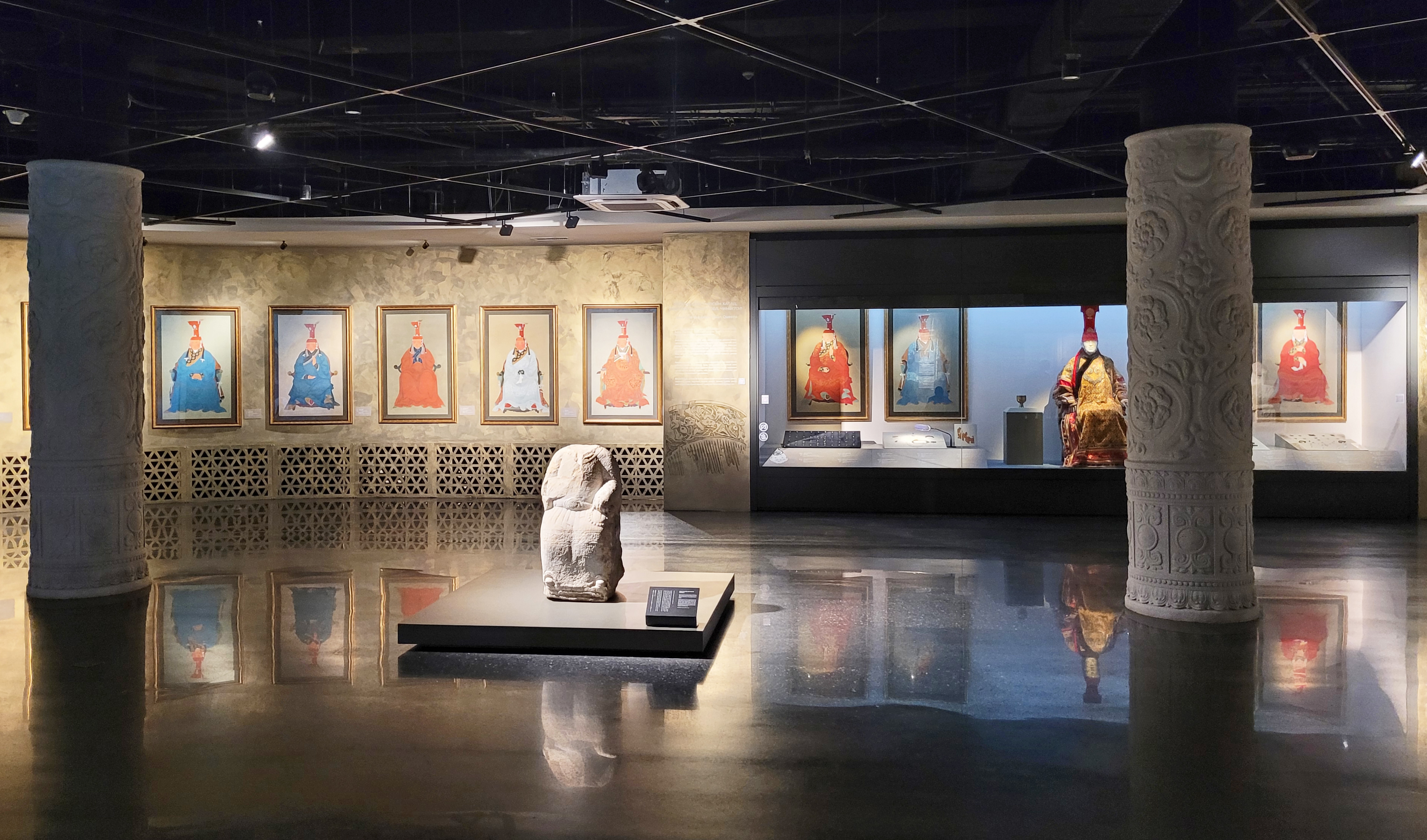
Interior

The museum exhibits more than 10,000 artifacts, and more than 85% of them are the original ones.

== See also ==
- List of museums in Mongolia
