= Chingeltei =

District in Ulaanbaatar, Mongolia

Coordinates: 47.9167°N 106.9167°E

Chingeltei District Чингэлтэй дүүрэг ᠴᠢᠩᠭᠢᠯᠲᠡᠢ ᠲᠡᠭᠦᠷᠭᠡ
- Municipal District
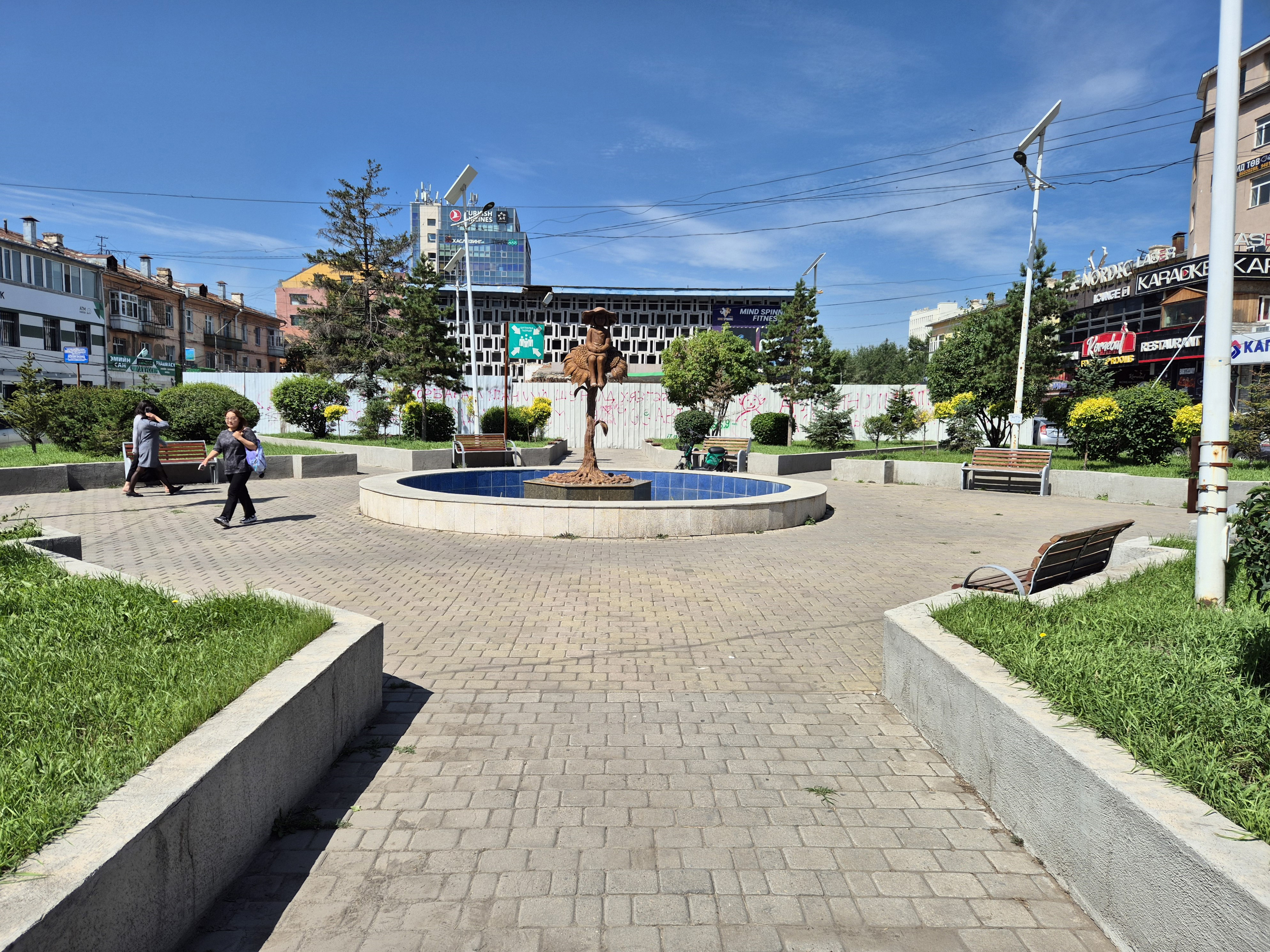

- Flag Coat of arms
- Interactive map of Chingeltei District
- Country: Mongolia
- Municipality: Ulaanbaatar
- Sükhbaatar raion of Ulaanbaatar: 1965
- Reorganized as district: 1992

Government
  - Body: Citizens' Representatives Khural of the Chingeltei district
  - Governor of District: N.Batsümberel, MPP

Area
  - Total: 89.3 km^{2} (34.5 sq mi)

Population (2024)
  - Total: 136,280
- Time zone: UTC+8 (UTC + 8)
- Website: Official website

Chingeltei (Mongolian: Чингэлтэй [t͡ɕʰiŋkɪ̆ɬtʰé]) is one of the nine districts of Ulaanbaatar, Mongolia. It is subdivided into 18 subdistricts.

== Geography ==
Chingeltei is located in the north, at the foot of one of the four mountains of Ulaanbaatar, the Chingeltei Uul. It has a total area of 89 km^{2}.

== Administrative divisions ==
The district consists of 24 khoroo and 212 khesegs.

== Economy ==
The main industry and economic sectors in the district are light industry, construction, trade and telecommunication. It also houses some of large financial institutions, government and law enforcement agencies.

== Tourist attractions ==
- Chinggis Khaan National Museum
- Fine Arts Zanabazar Museum
- Mongolian Natural History Museum
- National Museum of Mongolia
- State Department Store
