= Tsetsii Wind Farm =

Wind farm in Ömnögovi, Mongolia

- Official name: Цэций Салхин Цахилгаан Станц
- Country: Mongolia
- Location: Ömnögovi, Mongolia
- Coordinates: 43°33′35.4″N 105°36′48.6″E
- Status: Operational
- Commission date: October 2017
- Construction cost: US$120.7 million

Power generation
- Units operational: 25 X 2 MW
- Nameplate capacity: 50 MW

The Tsetsii Wind Farm (Mongolian: Цэций Салхин Цахилгаан Станц) is a 50 MW wind farm in Ömnögovi Province, Mongolia.

== History ==
The wind farm was constructed at a cost of US$120.7 million and commissioned in October 2017.

Upon commissioning, it became the second wind farm established in Mongolia after Salkhit Wind Farm.

== Technical specification ==
The wind farm has a total installed generating capacity of 50 MW. It consists of twenty five 2MW turbines.

== See also ==
- Renewable energy in Mongolia
- List of power stations in Mongolia
