= Electricity sector in Mongolia =

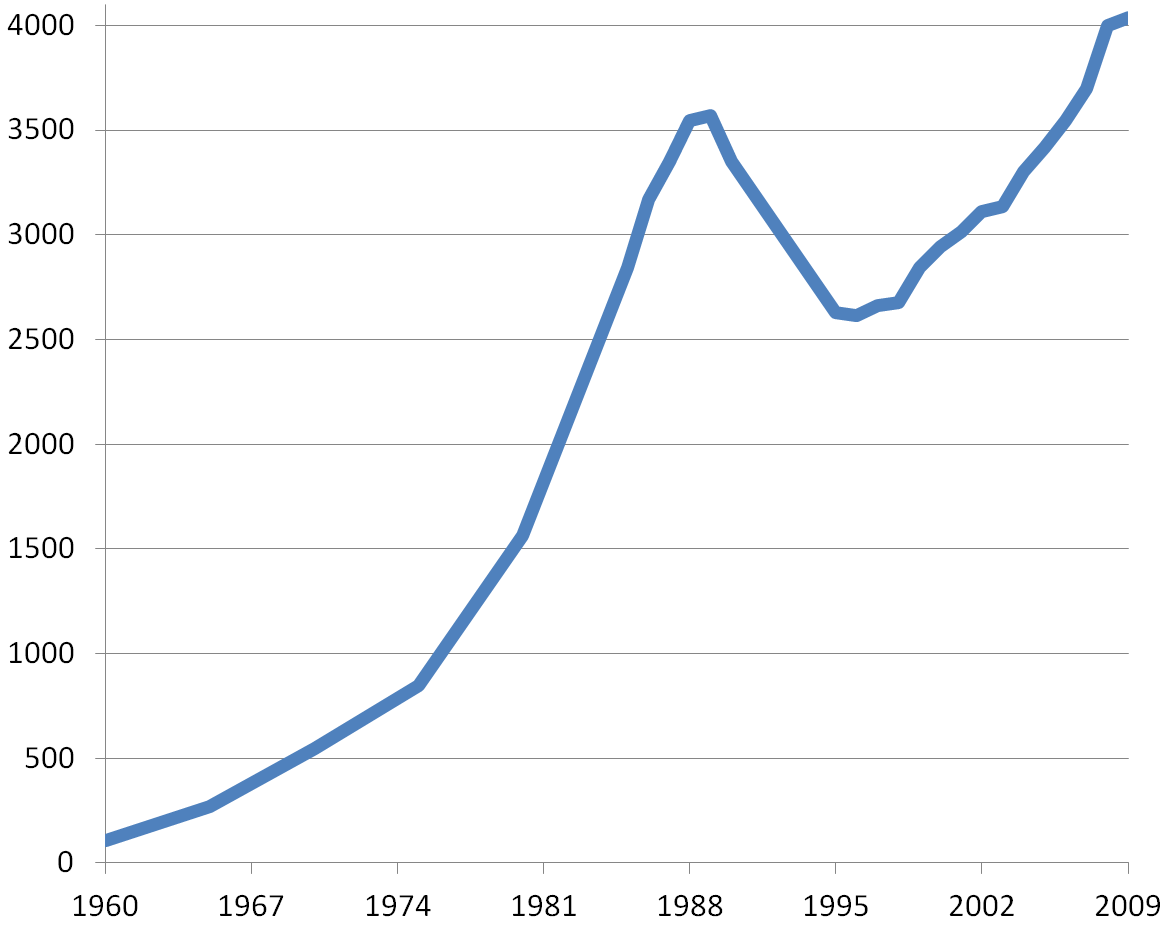
Electricity production in Mongolia in 1960-2010

The electricity sector in Mongolia ranges from generation, transmission, distribution and sales of electricity in Mongolia.

== Generation ==
=== Capacity ===
In 2018, Mongolia consumed 8.2 TWh of electricity in which 6.5 TWh (79.7%) was generated domestically and 1.7 TWh (20.3%) was imported from China and Russia. With the interconnection with Russia, Mongolia imports up to 300 MW of electricity from the country.

=== Power plants ===
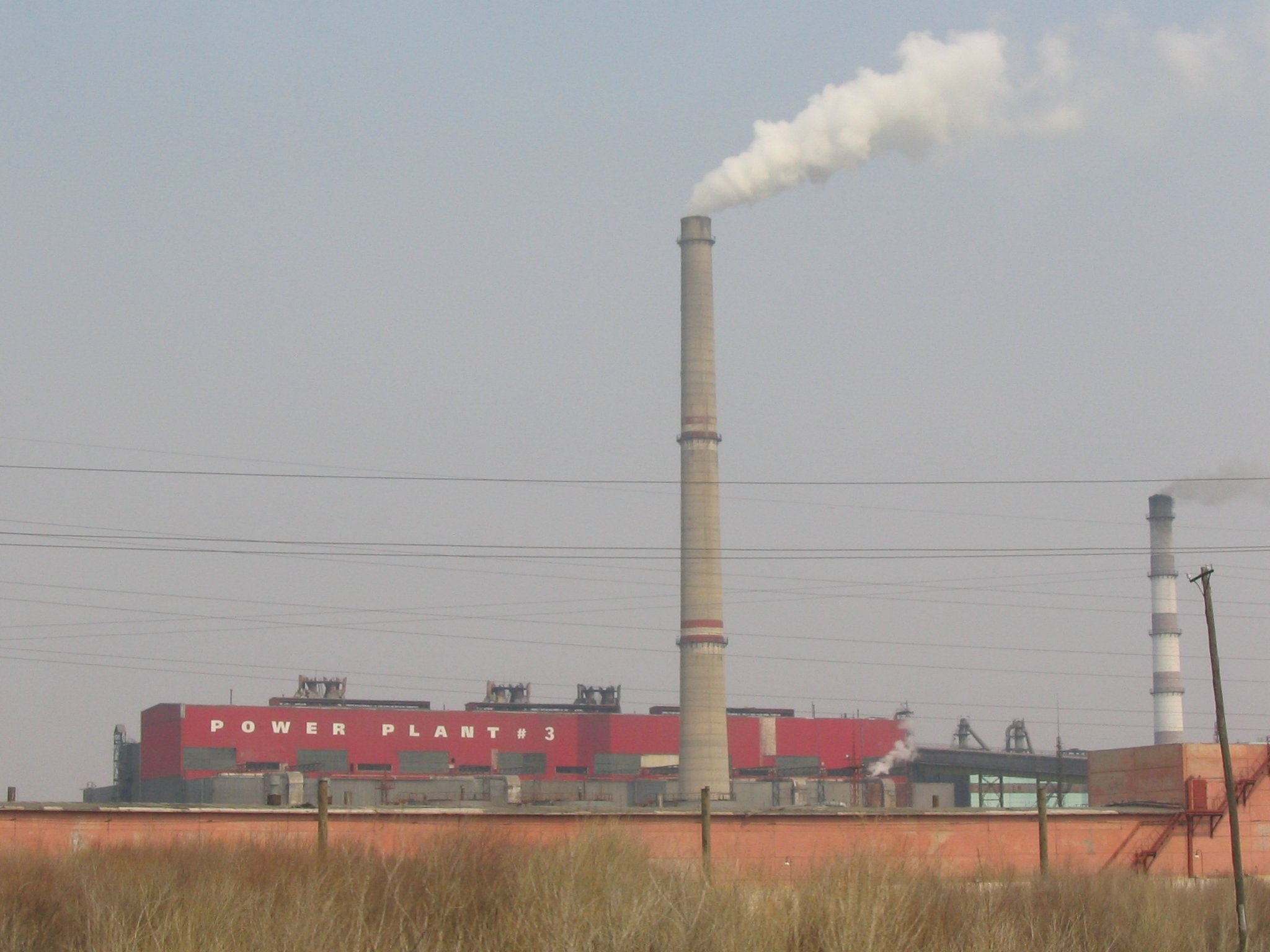
Thermal Power Plant No. 3 in Ulaanbaatar

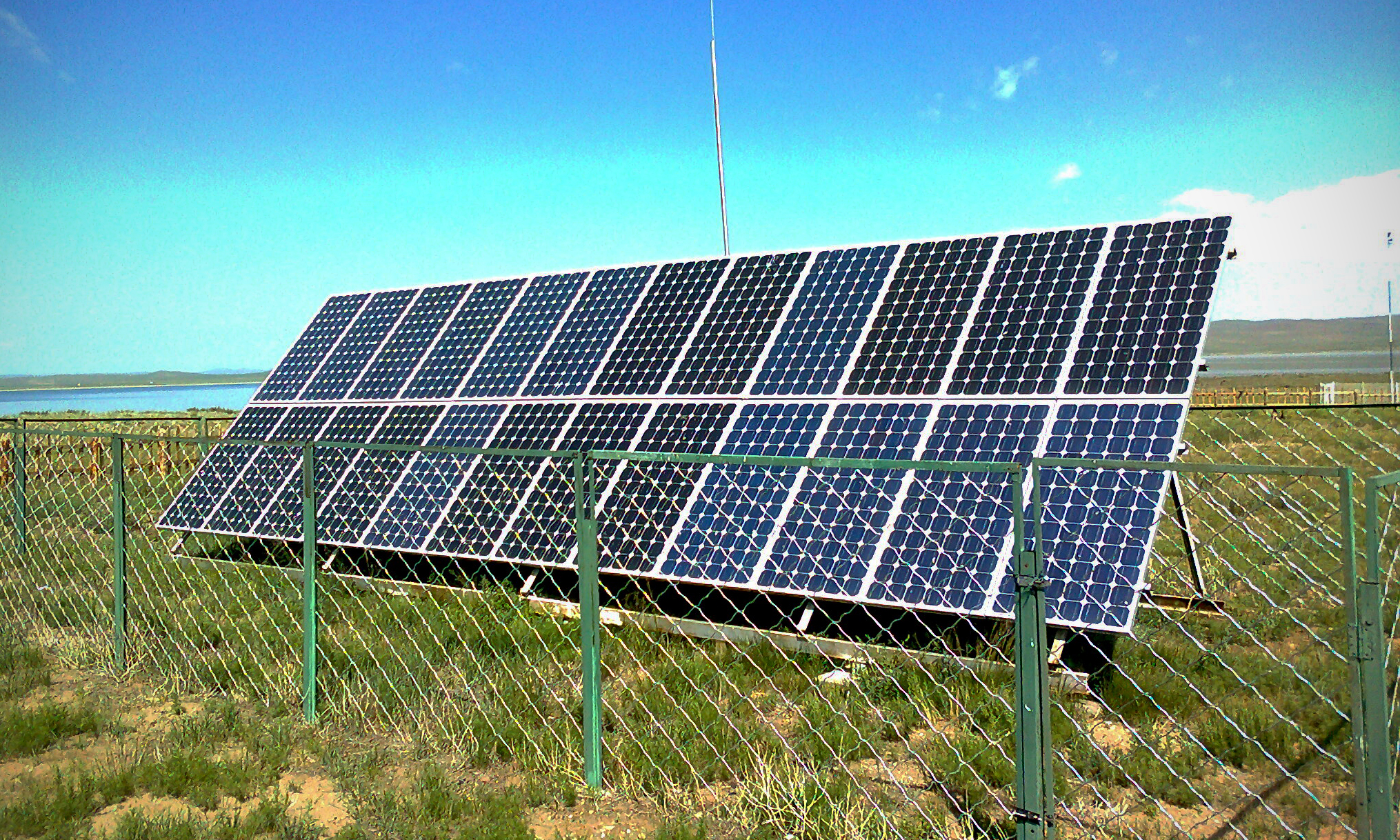
Solar panel in Ögii nuur, Arkhangai Province

In 2010, the total amount of electricity produced by all types of power plant in Mongolia are 4,256.1 GWh (thermal power), 31 GWh (hydroelectric), 13.2 GWh (diesel) and 0.6 GWh (solar and wind).

=== Fuel types ===
In 2012, coal was used to generate 98% of the electricity in Mongolia.

Electricity generation by power source (GWh)
Year	Coal	Oil	Hydro	Wind
2015	4670	10	70	150
2014	4510	10	60	120
2013	4280	10	60	50

== Transmission ==
Due to its large and sparse population, the electrical grid in Mongolia is divided into four areas, which are Central Energy System (CES), Western Energy System, Eastern Energy System and Altai-Uliastai Energy System. The CES is interconnected with electrical grid of Russia at 220kV level. Electric transmission in the country is operated by National Power Transmission Grid.

== Distribution ==
The sole electrical distribution company in Ulaanbaatar is the Ulaanbaatar Electricity Distribution Network. The load dispatch within the country is managed by the National Dispatching Center.

== Retail ==
In 2000, the electricity price is ₮45,000 per kWh.

== Consumption ==
In the 2023–2024 winter, the maximum electrical load in Mongolia is expected to be about 1,567 MW.

In 2018, much of Mongolia's electricity consumption was driven by industry and construction.

Mongolian Energy Consumption by Sector
Sector	Electricity Consumption (%)
Industry & Construction	47
Transport & Communication	3
Agriculture	1
Household & Communal Housing	18
Others	7
Transmission & Distribution Losses	12
Station Usage	12
Export	0

== See also ==
- Energy in Mongolia
- List of electricity sectors
