= Ulaan Ovoo coal mine =

Coal mine in Selenge, Mongolia

Ulaan Ovoo Coal Mine
- Location within Mongolia
- Location: Tüshig District, Selenge, Mongolia; 50°19′4″N 104°58′25″E
- Products: brown coal
- Opened: 2010
- Company: Prophecy Coal Company

The Ulaan Ovoo Coal Mine (Mongolian: Улаан Овоо, red mound) is a coal mine located in the Tüshig District of Selenge aimag in northern Mongolia. It is located on the northern shore of the Zelter River a short distance west of the sum center.

The mine has coal reserves amounting to 208.8 million tonnes of brown coal.

== History ==
Geologists from the Soviet Union explored the area for coal mining potential in the 1970s. In 2006, the mine was slowly purchased by Canadian company Prophecy Coal Company and it was fully acquired in 2010.

== Business ==
The coal extracted from the mine is used to power up Darkhan and Erdenet Thermal Power Plants.
