= Taishir Hydro Power Station =

Hydroelectric power plant in Taishir, Govi-Altai, Mongolia

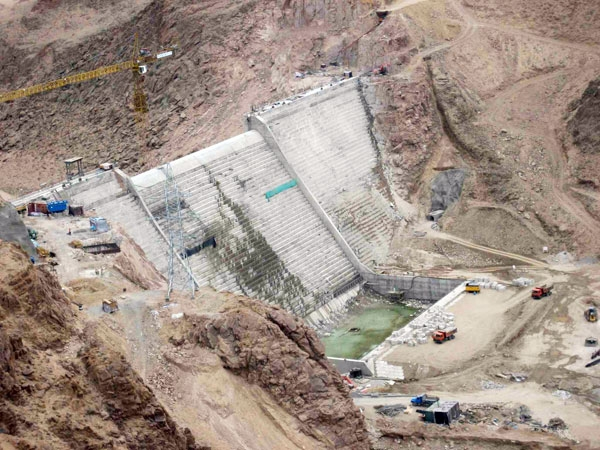
- Official name: Тайширын Усан Цахилгаан Станц
- Country: Mongolia
- Location: Taishir, Govi-Altai
- Coordinates: 46°41′37.8″N 96°39′53.8″E
- Status: Operational
- Commission date: 2008
- Construction cost: US$39 million

Power generation
- Nameplate capacity: 11 MW

The Taishir Hydro Power Station (Mongolian: Тайширын Усан Цахилгаан Станц) is a hydroelectric power station in Taishir, Govi-Altai Province, Mongolia.

== History ==
The power station was commissioned in 2008.

== Technical specification ==
The water intake for the power station comes from Gegeen Lake. The power station has an installed capacity of 11 MW.

== Finance ==
The power station and its dam was constructed with a cost of US$39 million. It was funded by Kuwait Fund for Arab Economic Development and the United Arab Emirates.

== See also ==
- List of power stations in Mongolia
- Energy in Mongolia
