= Ulaanbaatar Electricity Distribution Network =

Electric utility of Mongolia

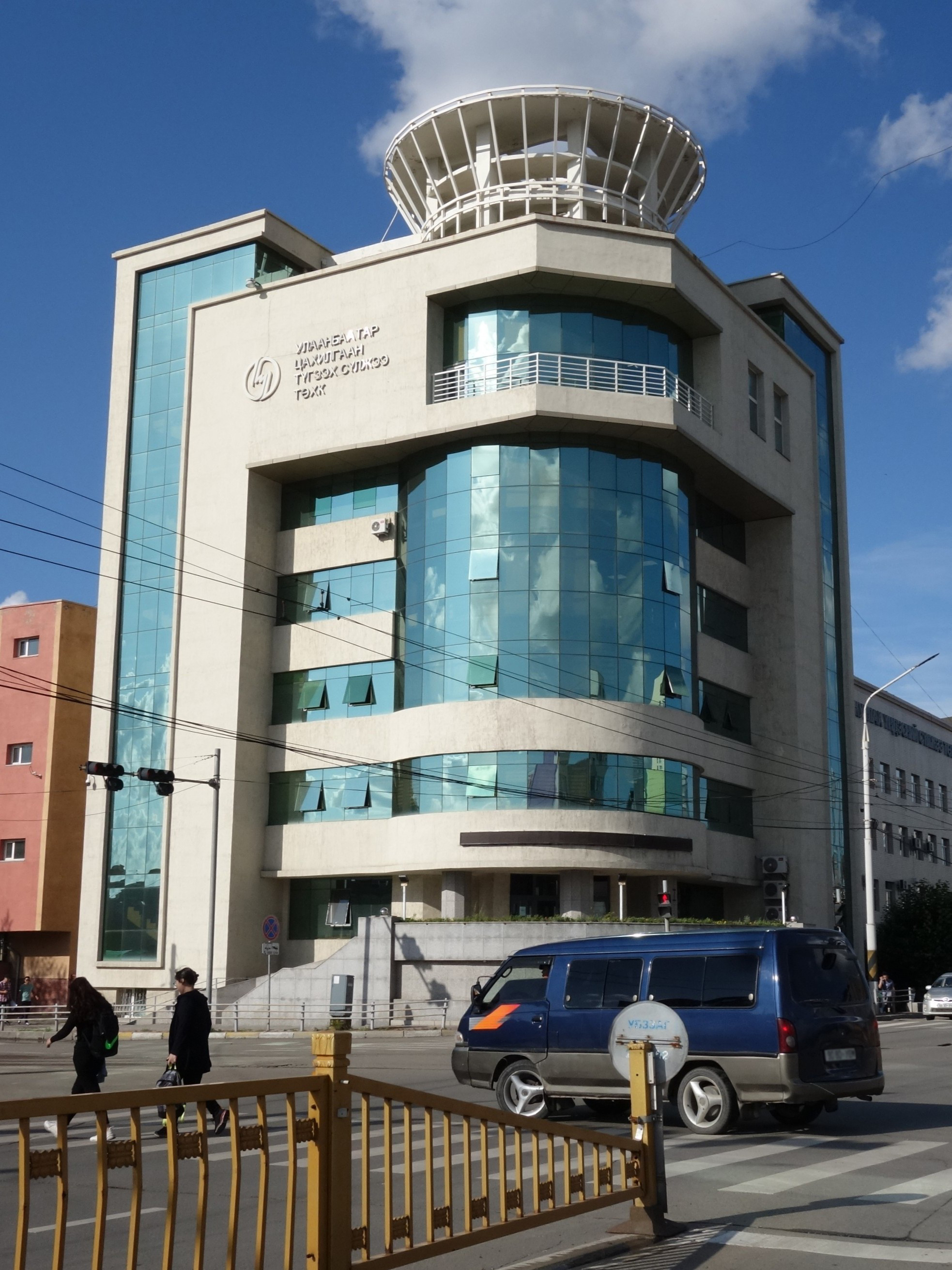
- Native name: Улаанбаатар цахилгаан түгээх сүлжээ
- Formerly: Ulaanbaatar Electricity Distribution Network Authority
- Company type: public utility
- Industry: electric power distribution
- Predecessor: Energy Authority
- Founded: 2001
- Headquarters: Ulaanbaatar, Mongolia
- Number of employees: 1,920 (2021)
- Website: Official website

The Ulaanbaatar Electricity Distribution Network (UBEDN; Mongolian: Улаанбаатар цахилгаан түгээх сүлжээ) is an electric power distribution company in Ulaanbaatar, Mongolia.

== History ==
The Energy Authority was dissolved in 2001. It was then followed with the establishment of Ulaanbaatar Electricity Distribution Network in the same year.

== Human resources ==
The company employed 1,920 people as of 2021.

== See also ==
- Electricity sector in Mongolia
- List of power stations in Mongolia
