= District heating of Kharkhorin =

District heating of Kharkhorin, Övörkhangai, Mongolia

The district heating system of Kharkhorin in Övörkhangai Province, Mongolia provides heating to the city of Kharkhorin, especially during winter months.

== Infrastructure ==
With the absence of a centralized district heating system, the district center of Kharkhorin is heated by four private boiler houses, which are TSTR, Sod Eel, Uv Post and Gan Manlai. All of the boilers are privately owned.

It has a total capacity of 6.8 MW with the design heat load of 6.5 MW, where 5.6 MW is for heating and 0.7 MW is for hot water. The boilers use untreated raw water. The heating season runs 15 September through 15 May, when the average air temperature is -4.8°C.

=== TSTR ===
TSTR is the largest boiler house in Kharkhorin, supplying 42% of the total heat consumed in Kharhorin. It has an existing design heat load of 1,571 kW for heating and 190 kW for hot water supply. It consists of four 1-MW boilers. It has a total heat network pipeline length of 3,300 meters both ways. The biggest pipeline of its heat network has a diameter of 209 mm.

=== Sod Eel ===
Sod Eel boiler house supplies 17% of the total heat consumed in Kharhorin. It consists of two sub-companies, which are Unet Mongol and Artsogt. Unet Mongol has a total heat network pipeline length of 2,150 meters both ways, where it supplies mostly to the health facilities and hotels. It has an existing design heat load of 738 kW for heating and 72 kW for hot water supply. Artsogt has a total heat network pipeline length of 50 meters both ways, where it supplies mostly to schools. It has an existing design heat load of 314 kW for heating and 20 kW for hot water supply.

=== Uv Post ===
UV Post boiler house supplies to kindergartens and schools. It has an existing design heat load of 954 kW for heating and 121 kW for hot water supply. It has a total heat network pipeline length of 100 meters both ways.

=== Gan Manlai ===
Gan Manlai heating system was built in 2015. It has an existing design heat load of 322 kW for heating and 83 kW for hot water supply. It supplies to more than 50 individual houses.

== Fuels ==
All of the boilers of the Kharkhorin district heating system are powered by coal. The coal is transported by trucks to the boiler houses with a distance of 300 km. For each of 1.0 MWh heat production made for the district heating, it requires 570 kg of coal, with an average annual coal consumption of 3,700 tons.

== Loads ==
Kharkhorin has a total annual heat consumption of 22.4 Gwh.

== See also ==
- Energy in Mongolia
