= Sainshand Wind Farm =

Wind farm in Dornogovi, Mongolia

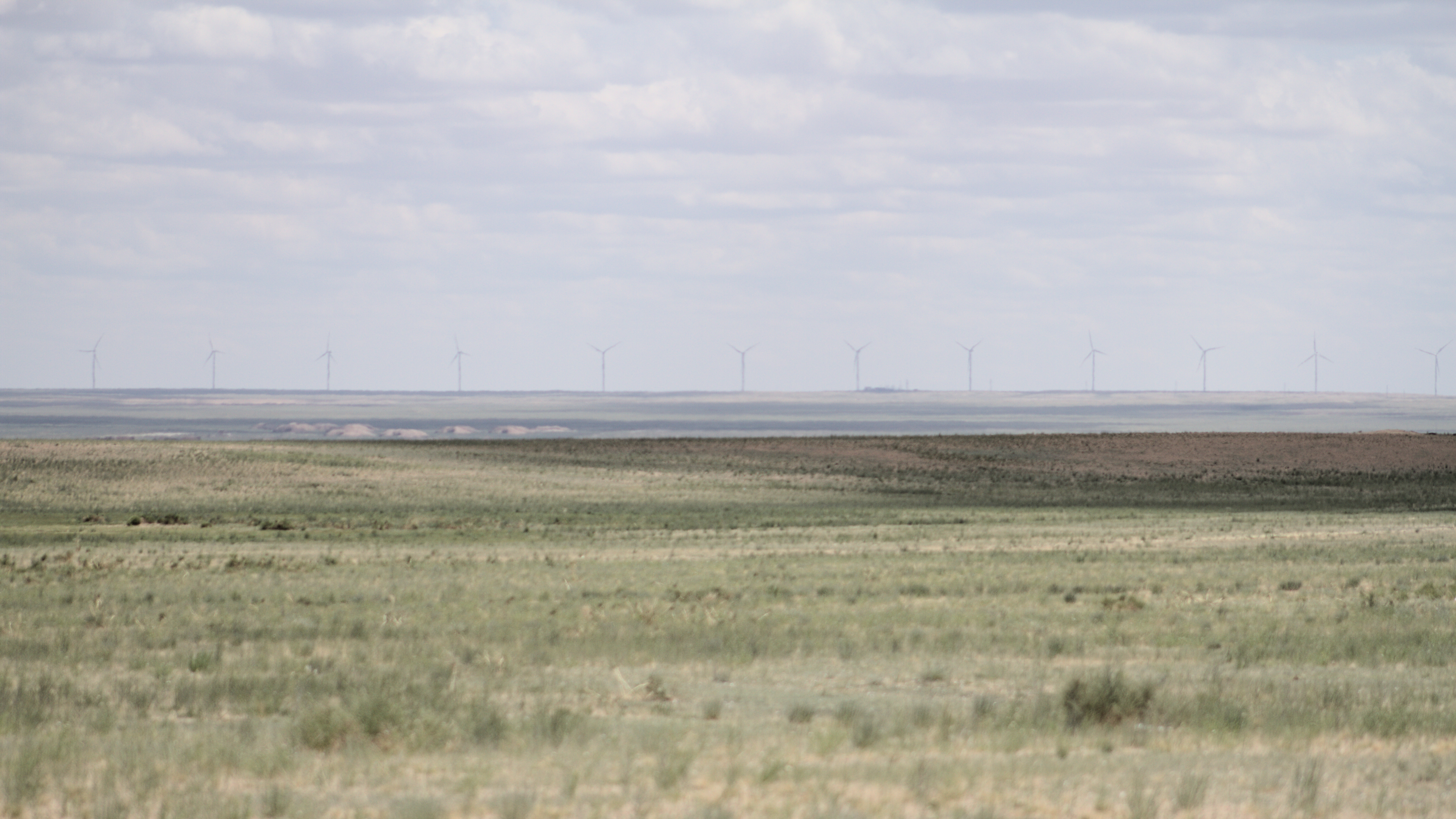
- Official name: Сайншанд Салхин Парк
- Country: Mongolia
- Location: Sainshand, Dornogovi, Mongolia
- Coordinates: 44°54′56.8″N 110°14′15.4″E
- Status: Operational
- Construction began: March 2018
- Commission date: September 2018
- Construction cost: US$120 million

Wind farm
- Hub height: 80 m
- Rotor diameter: 120 m

Power generation
- Units operational: 25 X 2.2 MW
- Nameplate capacity: 55 MW

External links
- Website: Official website

The Sainshand Wind Farm (Mongolian: Сайншанд Салхин Парк) is a 49.6 MW wind farm in Sainshand, Dornogovi Province, Mongolia.

== History ==
The wind farm owner company Sainshand Salkhin Park LLC (Mongolian: Сайншанд Cалхин Парк XXК) was established in 2009. The initiation of the project was announced in August 2017. The construction of the wind farm started in March 2018 with the arrival of the first wind turbine. The first wind turbine was fully installed in April 2018. The wind farm was commissioned in September 2018.

== Architecture ==
The wind farm spans over an area of 486 hectares.

== Technical specification ==
The wind farm has a total installed generation capacity of 55 MW. It consists of a total of 25 wind turbines with each having 2.2 MW rated capacity. The rotor diameter of the wind turbine is 120 meters and the swept area is 11,310 m^{2}. The hub height of the turbine is 80 meters and the length of each blade is 59 meters. The nacelle of the turbine is 10.4 meters long and 3.5 meters wide.

== Finance ==
The wind farm was constructed with a cost of US$120 million. It is financed by the European Bank for Reconstruction and Development and European Investment Bank with a value of US$31.5 million and US$78.5 million respectively.

== See also ==
- Renewable energy in Mongolia
- List of power stations in Mongolia
