= National Dispatching Center (Mongolia) =

Load and district heating dispatch center of Mongolia

- Native name: Диспетчерийн Үндэсний Төв
- Industry: electric power distribution, district heating
- Predecessor: Dispatching Department
- Founded: August 1964
- Headquarters: Ulaanbaatar, Mongolia
- Number of employees: 124 (2021)
- Website: Official website (in Mongolian)

The National Dispatching Center (NDC; Mongolian: Диспетчерийн Үндэсний Төв) is a dispatch center based in Ulaanbaatar, Mongolia which manages the electrical grid and district heating of the country.

== History ==
The NDC was originally established in August 1964 as Dispatching Department. In July 2001, it was nationalized and became the National Dispatching Center.

== Networks ==
The center operates SCADA which collects data from 18 power stations and 20 substations.

== Organizations ==
As of 2021, the center has a total of 124 employees divided into 10 departments.

== See also ==
- Electricity sector in Mongolia
- List of power stations in Mongolia
