= National Power Transmission Grid =

Electric utility of Mongolia

- Native name: Цахилгаан Дамжуулах Үндэсний Сүлжээ ТӨХК
- Type: public utility
- Industry: electric power transmission
- Founded: 1967
- Headquarters: Ulaanbaatar, Mongolia
- Number of employees: 1,292 (2021)
- Website: Official website (in Mongolian)

The National Power Transmission Grid (NPTG; Mongolian: Цахилгаан Дамжуулах Үндэсний Сүлжээ ТӨХК) or National Power Transmission Grid State Own Stock Company is an electric power transmission company in Ulaanbaatar, Mongolia.

== History ==
The company was founded in 1967.

== Structures ==
=== Organization ===
The company is headquartered in Ulaanbaatar. It has five branch offices, which are Ulaanbaatar branch, Hangai regional branch, Central regional branch, Southeast regional branch and Gobi regional branch.

=== Operation ===
The company operates the high voltage electric power transmission assets in the country on the overhead transmission lines of 220 kV, 100 kV and 35 kV and 80 substation in 16 provinces and 300 districts.

== Human resources ==
The company employed 1,292 people as of September 2021.

== See also ==
- Electricity sector in Mongolia
- List of power stations in Mongolia
