= Bayanjargalan =

Bayanjargalan is the name of two sums (districts) in Mongolia:

- Bayanjargalan, Dundgovi
- Bayanjargalan, Töv
