= Durgun Hydro Power Station =

Hydroelectric power plant in Khovd, Mongolia

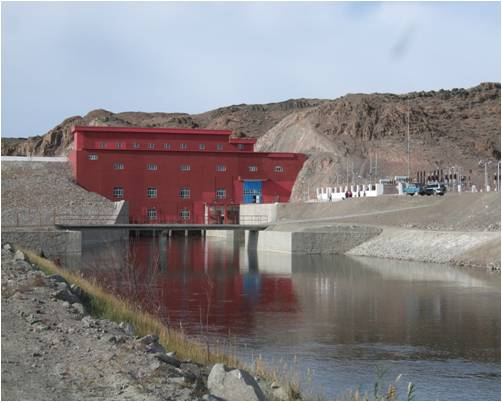
- Official name: Дөргөний Усан Цахилгаан Станц
- Country: Mongolia
- Location: Khovd Province
- Coordinates: 48°19′34.0″N 92°48′25.0″E
- Status: Operational
- Commission date: 2008

Power generation
- Nameplate capacity: 12 MW
- Annual net output: 38 GWh

The Durgun Hydro Power Station (Mongolian: Дөргөний Усан Цахилгаан Станц) is a hydroelectric power station in Khovd Province, Mongolia.

== History ==
The feasibility for the construction of the power station was done by Russian Hydroproject Institute in 1992. The power station was commissioned in 2008.

== Technical specifications ==
The power station has an installed capacity of 12 MW. It has an annual 38 GWh generation of electricity.

== See also ==
- List of power stations in Mongolia
- Energy in Mongolia
