= Energy in Mongolia =

Mongolia had a total primary energy supply (TPES) of 6.66 Mtoe in 2019. Electricity consumption was 7.71 TWh. Mongolia is a big producer of coal, which is mostly exported. Domestic consumption of coal accounts for about 70% of Mongolia's primary energy and makes up most of the electricity generation, accounting for about 87% of the domestic electricity production in 2019.

== Electricity generation ==
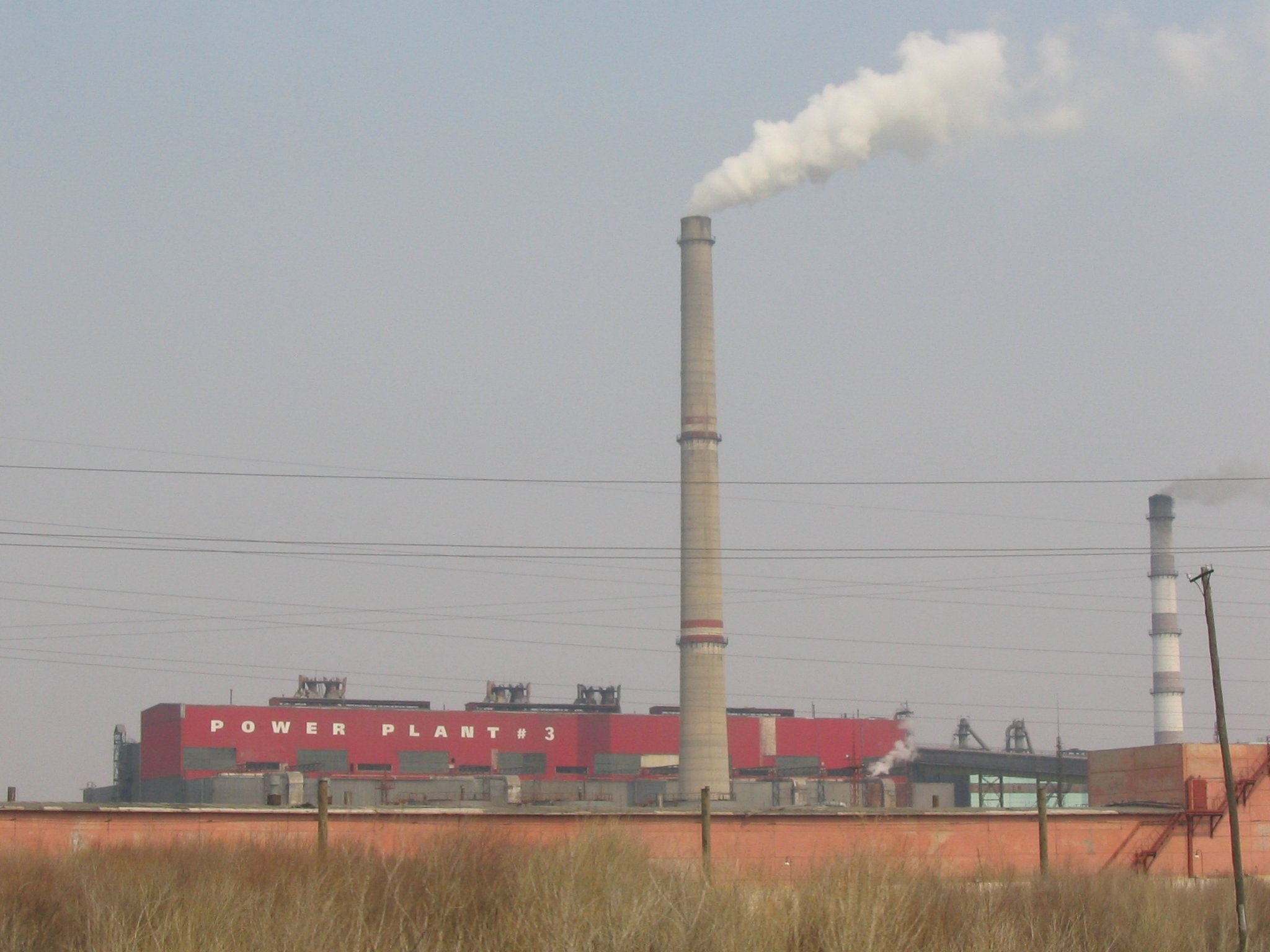
Thermal Power Plant No. 3 in Ulaanbaatar

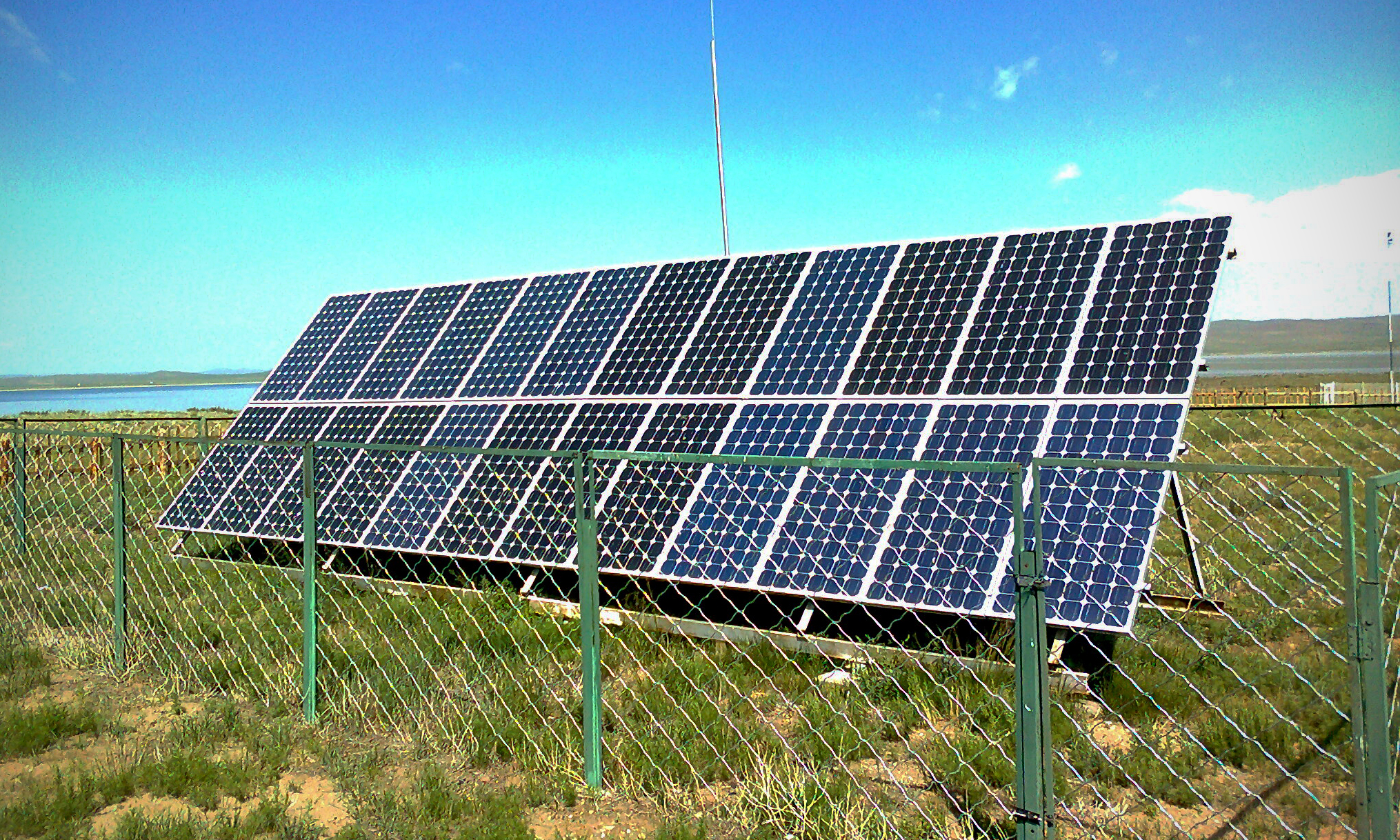
Solar panel in Ögii nuur, Arkhangai Province

In 2010, the total amount of electricity produced by all types of power plant in Mongolia are 4,256.1 GWh (thermal power), 31 GWh (hydroelectric), 13.2 GWh (diesel) and 0.6 GWh (solar and wind). In 2012, coal was used to generate 98% of the electricity in Mongolia.

Electricity generation by power source (GWh)
Year	Coal	Oil	Hydro	Wind
2015	4670	10	70	150
2014	4510	10	60	120
2013	4280	10	60	50

=== Coal power ===
Coal-fired power stations are the dominant type of electricity generation in Mongolia and may also supply heat. There are 7 currently active power stations.

List	Constructed in	Defunct	Electrical capacity (MW)	Thermal capacity(Gcal/year)
Ulaanbaatar Thermal Power Plant 1	1934	1988		
Ulaanbaatar Thermal Power Plant 2	1961	-	24	55
Ulaanbaatar Thermal Power Plant 3	1968	-	186	585
Ulaanbaatar Thermal Power Plant 4	1983	-	700	1373
Baganuur Thermal Plant	1980	-	-	300
Erdenet Thermal Power Plant	1987	-	28.8	302.5
Dalanzadgad Thermal Power Plant	2000	-		
Darkhan Thermal Power Plant	1965	-	48	1196
Amgalan Thermal Power Plant	2015	-	348	
Choibalsan Thermal Power Plant	1969		36	
Buuruljuut Power Plant	2024	-	300	

=== Renewable energy ===
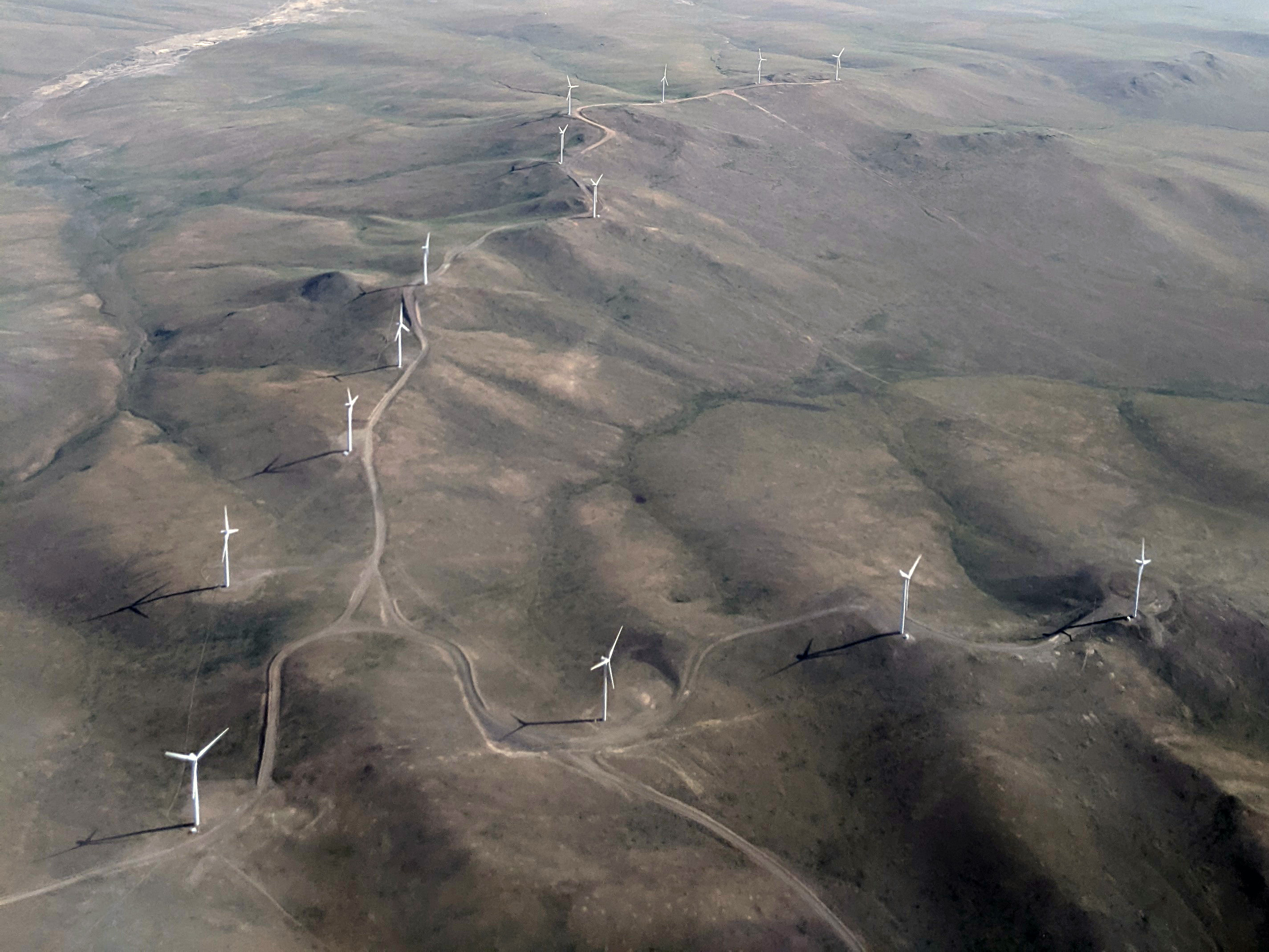
Salkhit Wind Farm, south of Ulaanbaatar

In 2018, 7% of Mongolia's electricity came from renewable power sources, mainly wind power. Mongolia has very sunny weather with average insolation above 1,500 W/m2 in most of the country, making solar power highly available.

In 2017, Mongolia commissioned the 10 MW Darkhan Solar Power Plant in Darkhan-Uul Province, the first photovoltaic power station in the country. 247 MW of solar power plants have been approved for construction. Guaranteed power purchase agreements and favorable tariff structures promote further growth of the industry.

== Electricity consumption ==
In 2018, much of Mongolia's electricity consumption was driven by industry and construction.

Mongolian Energy Consumption by Sector
Sector	Electricity Consumption (%)
Industry & Construction	47
Transport & Communication	3
Agriculture	1
Household & Communal Housing	18
Others	7
Transmission & Distribution Losses	12
Station Usage	12
Export	0

== See also ==
- Mongolia Energy Corporation
- List of mines in Mongolia § Coal
- Environmental issues in Mongolia
- Economy of Mongolia
