= Gegeen Solar Power Plant =

Photovoltaic power plant in Zamyn-Üüd, Dornogovi, Mongolia

- Official name: Гэгээн Нарны Цахилгаан Станц
- Country: Mongolia
- Location: Zamyn-Üüd, Dornogovi
- Coordinates: 43°43′30.4″N 111°49′36.2″E
- Status: Operational
- Commission date: September 2018
- Construction cost: US$26 million
- Employees: 20

Power generation
- Nameplate capacity: 16.5 MW
- Annual net output: 31 GWh

The Gegeen Solar Power Plant (Mongolian: Гэгээн Нарны Цахилгаан Станц) is a photovoltaic power station in Zamyn-Üüd, Dornogovi Province, Mongolia.

== History ==
The construction of the power station was completed in 2017. It was then officially opened on 21 June 2018. In September 2018, it was commissioned. It was constructed with a cost of US$26 million.

== Architecture ==
The power station spans over an area of 40 hectares.

== Technical specifications ==
The power station has an annual generating capacity of 31,162 MWh. It consists of 51,840 PV modules, each with 320 W of nameplate capacity. The power station also includes a 11/110 kV substation and 6 km long 2-circuit 110 kV overhead transmission lines.

== Human resource ==
The power station employs 20 people.

== See also ==
- List of power stations in Mongolia
