= Bukhug Solar Power Plant =

Photovoltaic power plant in Sergelen, Töv, Mongolia

- Official name: Бөхөг Нарны Цахилгаан Станц
- Country: Mongolia
- Location: Sergelen, Töv
- Coordinates: 47°37′12.6″N 106°43′37.1″E
- Construction began: May 2018
- Commission date: June 2019
- Construction cost: US$18.7 million

Power generation
- Nameplate capacity: 15 MW
- Annual net output: 29.3 GWh

The Bukhug Solar Power Plant (Mongolian: Бөхөг Нарны Цахилгаан Станц) is a photovoltaic power station in Sergelen, Töv Province, Mongolia.

== History ==
The construction of the power station began in May 2018 and completed in December 2018. The power station was commissioned in mid June 2019. The transmission line going out from the power station was designed in 2017–2018 and was constructed in September–November 2018. The power plant was constructed with a cost of US$18.7 million.

== Technical specifications ==
The power station has an installed generation capacity of 15 MW and an annual generation output of 29.3 GWh. It consists of 51,372 photovoltaic panels.

== See also ==
- List of power stations in Mongolia
