= Khovd Nar Solar Power Plant =

Photovoltaic power plant in Myangad, Khovd, Mongolia

Bukhug Solar Power Plant
- Official name: Ховд Нар Нарны Цахилгаан Станц
- Country: Mongolia
- Location: Myangad, Khovd
- Coordinates: 48°15′09.1″N 91°55′40.2″E
- Commission date: May 2022
- Construction cost: US$16 million

Power generation
- Nameplate capacity: 10 MW

The Bukhug Solar Power Plant (Mongolian: Ховд Нар Нарны Цахилгаан Станц) is a photovoltaic power station in Myangad District, Khovd Province, Mongolia.

== History ==
The power plant was commissioned in May 2022.

== Technical specifications ==
The power plant has an installed capacity of 10 MW. It is a ground-mounted solar power plant.

== Finance ==
It was constructed with a cost of US$16 million and financed by the World Bank.

== See also ==
- List of power stations in Mongolia
