= Taishir =

District in Govi-Altai Province, Mongolia

Coordinates: 46°42′44″N 96°31′42″E

Taishir District Тайшир сум ᠲᠠᠶᠢᠰᠢᠷᠢᠰᠤᠮᠤ
- District
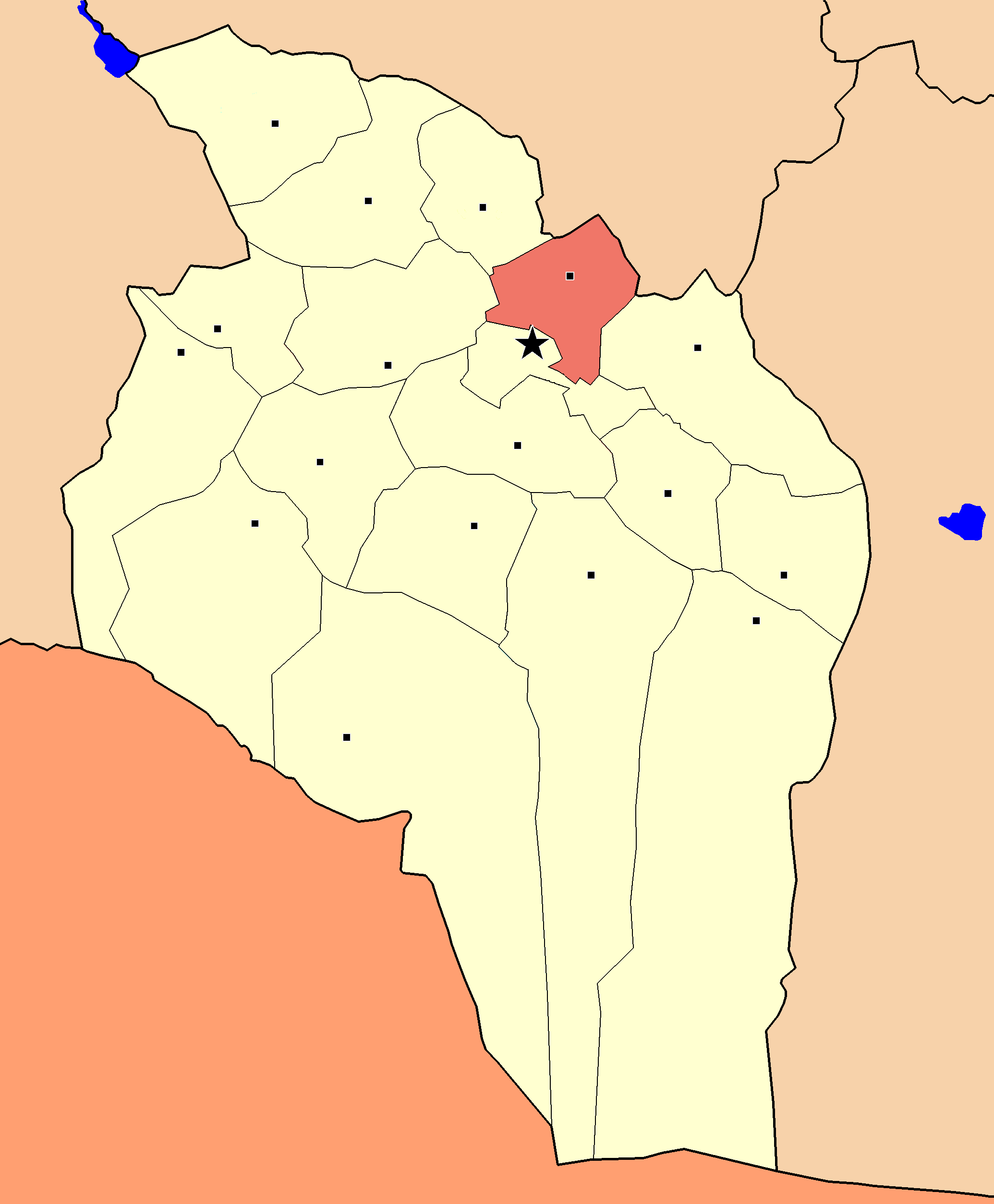
- Taishir District in Govi-Altai Province
- Country: Mongolia
- Province: Govi-Altai Province

Area
  - Total: 3,913 km^{2} (1,511 sq mi)
- Time zone: UTC+8 (UTC+8)

Taishir (Mongolian: Тайшир) is a sum (district) of Govi-Altai Province in western Mongolia. In 2009, its population was 1,536.

== Administrative divisions ==
The district is divided into three bags, which are:

- Dalan
- Galuut
- Khurimt

== Geology ==
- Gegeen Lake

== Infrastructure ==
- Taishir Hydro Power Station
