= Gegeen Lake =

Lake in Taishir, Govi-Altai, Mongolia

Gegeen Lake, Gegeen Nuur
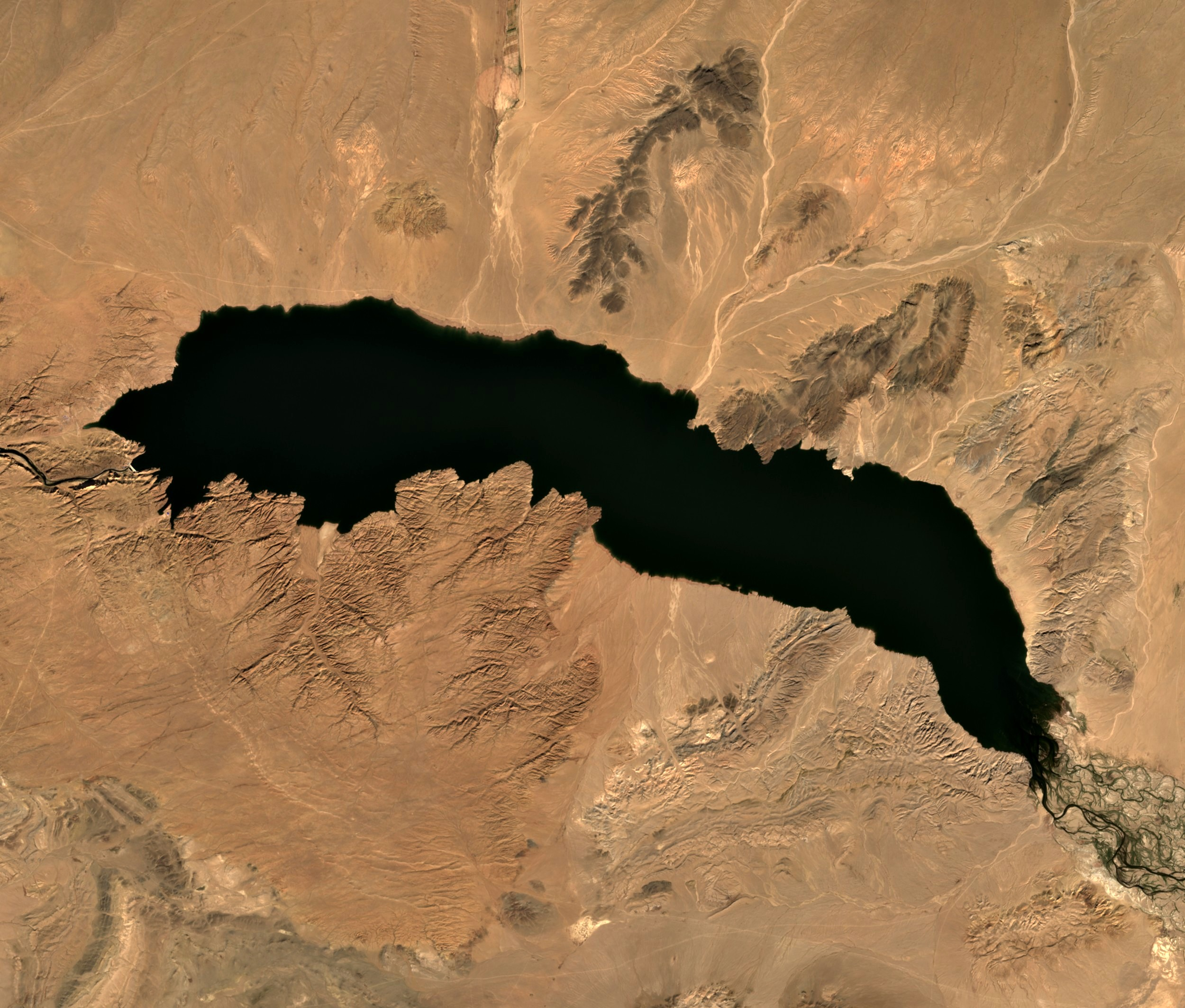

- Location within Mongolia
- Location: Taishir, Govi-Altai, Mongolia
- Coordinates: 46°41′N 96°46′E

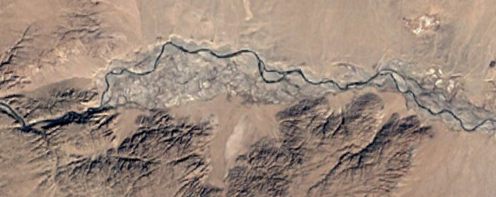
The lake before creation of the Taishir hydroelectric plant

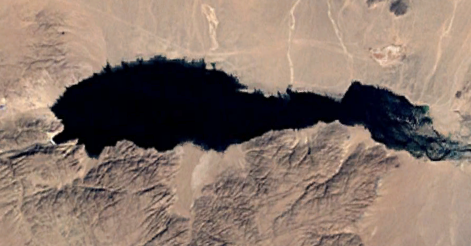
The lake forming.

Gegeen Lake, also known as Gegeen Nuur (Mongolian: Гэгээн нуур, "holy lake"), is a lake in Taishir, Govi-Altai Province, Mongolia. The lake lays within the Khangai Mountains and feeds the Zavkhan River. Taishir Hydro Power Station lays at the head of the lake; the station and accompanying dam created the entire lake in 2008.

== See also ==
- List of lakes of Mongolia
