= Sumber Solar Power Plant =

Photovoltaic power plant in Choir, Govisümber, Mongolia

- Official name: Сүмбэр Нарны Цахилгаан Станц
- Country: Mongolia
- Location: Choir, Govisümber
- Coordinates: 46°19′05.6″N 108°21′08.8″E
- Status: Operational
- Commission date: January 2019
- Construction cost: US$17.6 million

Solar farm
- Type: Standard PV

Power generation
- Nameplate capacity: 10 MW

The Sumber Solar Power Plant (Mongolian: Сүмбэр Нарны Цахилгаан Станц) is a photovoltaic power station in Choir, Govisümber Province, Mongolia.

== History ==
The construction of the power plant was completed by end of 2018. It was then commissioned in January 2019.

== Technical specifications ==
The power plant has an installed capacity of 10 MW. It consists of 31,000 solar panels.

== Finance ==
The power plant was constructed with a funding of US$17.6 million provided by XacBank. The bank made financial agreement with Green Climate Fund in November 2017.

== See also ==
- List of power stations in Mongolia
