= Myangad, Khovd =

District in Khovd Province, Mongolia

Coordinates: 48°14′07″N 91°55′18″E

Myangad District Мянгад сум ᠮᠢᠩᠭ᠋ᠠᠳᠰᠤᠮᠤ
- District
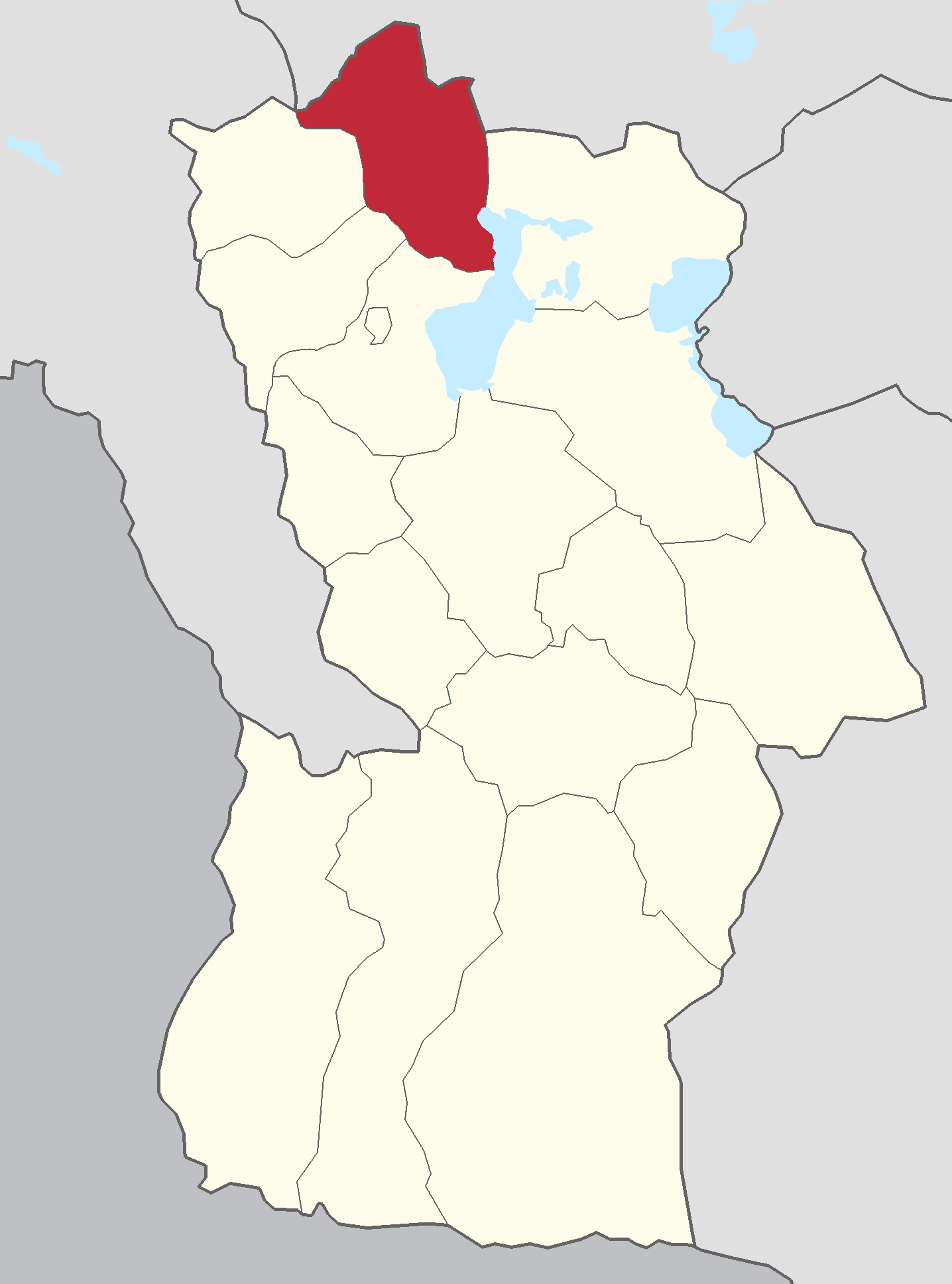
- Myangad District in Khovd Province
- Country: Mongolia
- Province: Khovd Province

Area
  - Total: 3,258 km^{2} (1,258 sq mi)
- Time zone: UTC+7 (UTC + 7)

Myangad (Mongolian: Мянгад) is a sum (district) of Khovd Province in western Mongolia. It is 35 km away from the city of Khovd.

== Administrative divisions ==
The district is divided into five bags, which are:

- Bayanbulag
- Bayankhoshuu
- Chatsargant
- Gakhait
- Tsagaanbulan

== Infrastructures ==
- Khovd Nar Solar Power Plant
