= Murun 10MW Solar Power Plant =

Photovoltaic power plant in Mörön, Khövsgöl, Mongolia

- Country: Mongolia
- Location: Mörön, Khövsgöl
- Coordinates: 49°36′37.5″N 100°12′37.6″E
- Status: Operational
- Commission date: December 2023

Power generation
- Nameplate capacity: 10 MW
- Annual net output: 15.5 GWh

The Murun 10MW Solar Power Plant is a photovoltaic power station in Mörön, Khövsgöl Province, Mongolia.

== History ==
The power station was commissioned in December 2023.

== Technical specifications ==
The power station spans over an area of 30 hectares. It is expected to generate 15.5 GWh of electricity annually. It will be connected to the national grid via Murun subtation. It will consist of 33,048 photovoltaic modules. The voltage output from the PV modules will be stepped up with 0.6/35kV step-up transformer to medium voltage and further with 35/110kV to high voltage level to be connected to transmission line.

== Finance ==
The power station is part of the Upscaling Renewable Energy Sector Project which is financed by Strategic Climate Fund, Japan Fund for the Joint Crediting Mechanism and Asian Development Bank for a total fund of US$60.6 million.

== See also ==
- List of power stations in Mongolia
