= Darkhan Thermal Power Plant =

Coal-fired power plant in Darkhan, Darkhan-Uul, Mongolia

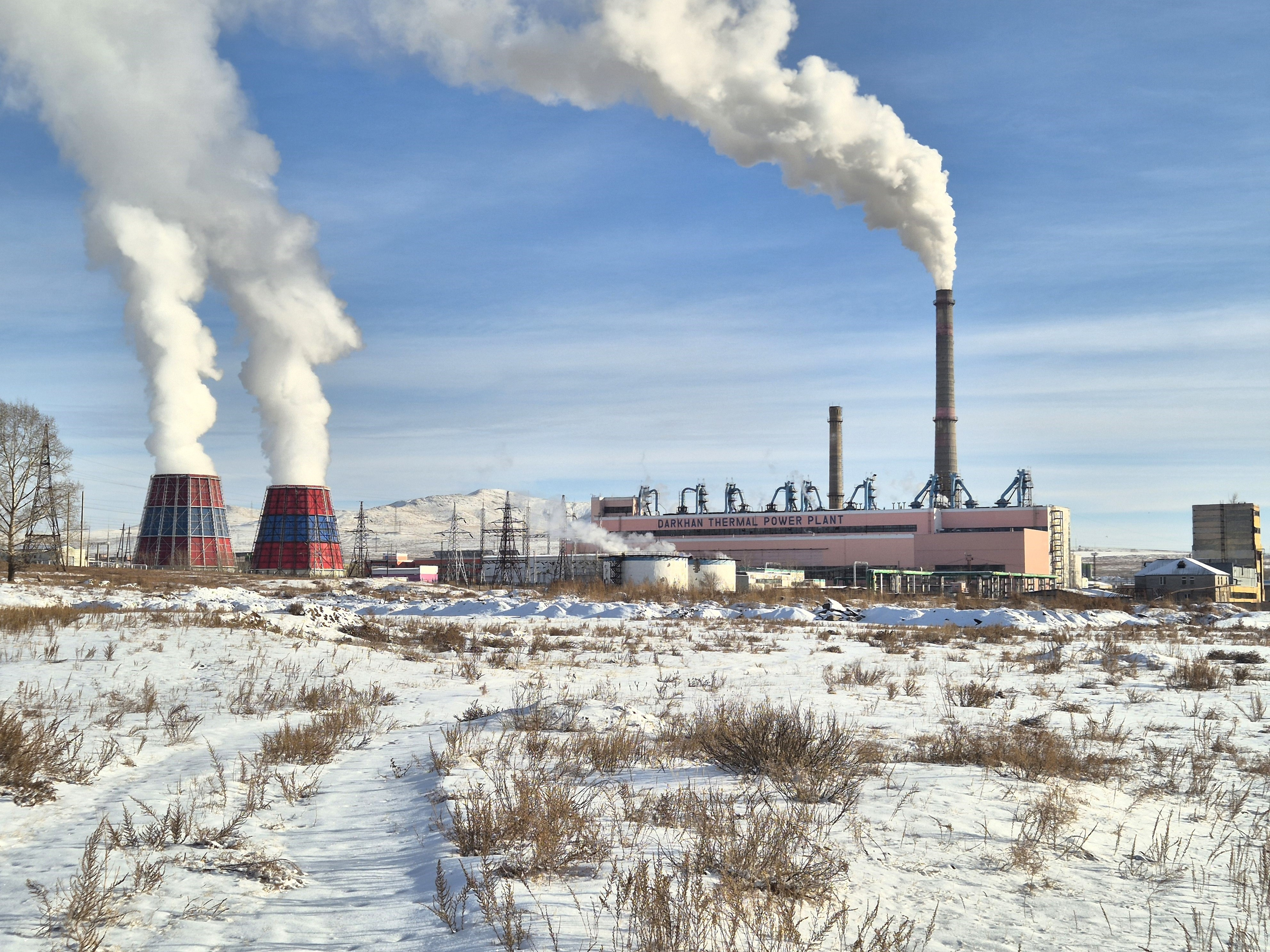
- Official name: Дулааны Цахилгаан Станц
- Country: Mongolia
- Location: Darkhan, Darkhan-Uul
- Coordinates: 49°26′12.9″N 105°57′28.9″E
- Status: Operational
- Construction began: 1963
- Commission date: 2 October 1965

Thermal power station
- Primary fuel: Coal
- Turbine technology: Steam turbine
- Feed-in tariff: ₮28.05 per kWh
- Cogeneration?: yes

Power generation
- Nameplate capacity: 83 MW
- Annual net output: 261 GWh

The Darkhan Thermal Power Plant (Mongolian: Дулааны Цахилгаан Станц) is a coal-fired cogeneration power station in Darkhan City, Darkhan-Uul Province, Mongolia.

== History ==
The plan to establish the power plant was made on 31 March 1961. Two years later in 1963, the construction of the power plant commenced. It was then commissioned on 2 October 1965. In 2012, the plant underwent overhaul works on its turbines. In 2019, a 35 MW generator was further added to the plant.

== Technical specifications ==
Upon its first commissioning, the power plant consists of four generation units with a total of 48 MW installed generation capacity. Currently the power plant has a total installed generation capacity of 83 MW. It generated 261 GWh of electricity in 2010.

It also acts as a district heating for Darkhan City. It has a heat supply capacity of 1,675 GJ/h and annual heat generation of 2,440,000 GJ in 2020.

Electricity generated from the power plant is transmitted through 110 kV overhead power line to Darkhan 220 kV substation, Sükhbaatar City, Darkhan City, Eruu and Sharyn Gol Coal Mine. It is also distributed through 35 kV line to Enkh Tal and Darkhan State Agricultural Farm and through 6 kV line to industries in Darkhan City.

== Fuel ==
The power plant receives coal for its fuel from Ulaan Ovoo coal mine, Sharyn Gol Coal Mine and Baganuur Coal Mine.

== Finance ==
The electricity production cost from the plant is ₮20.01 per kWh and sold for ₮28.05. The heat production cost from the plant is ₮4,073.3 per Gcal and sold for ₮1,393.8.

== See also ==
- List of power stations in Mongolia
