= Erdenet Thermal Power Plant =

Coal-fired power plant in Erdenet, Orkhon, Mongolia

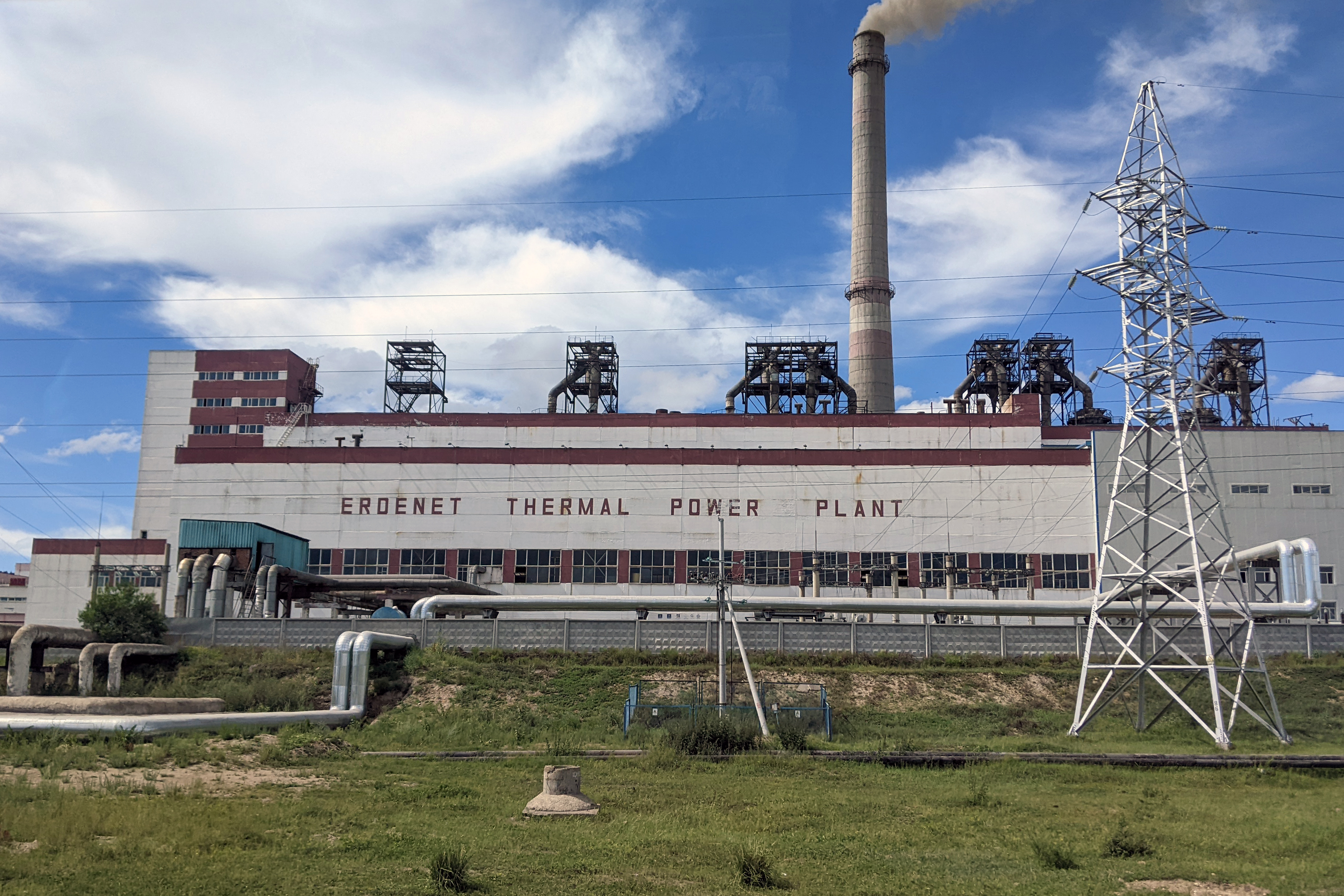
- Power Plant in 2022
- Official name: Эрдэнэтийн ДЦС
- Country: Mongolia
- Location: Erdenet, Orkhon Province
- Coordinates: 49°02′26.7″N 104°05′50.8″E
- Status: Operational
- Construction began: 1983
- Commission date: 1987

Thermal power station
- Primary fuel: Coal
- Turbine technology: Steam turbine
- Cogeneration?: yes

Power generation
- Annual net output: 324 GWh

The Erdenet Thermal Power Plant (Mongolian: Эрдэнэтийн ДЦС) is a coal-fired cogeneration power station in Erdenet, Orkhon Province, Mongolia

== History ==
In 1983, the Government of the Soviet Union agreed to construct the Erdenet Thermal Power Plant. The power plant went into operation in 1987. In December 2015, an investment agreement was reached for the power plant with an amount of US$53.8 million. In 2016, the power plant underwent expansion of 50 MW with a cost of US$53 million.

== Technical specifications ==
The power plant generated 324 GWh of electricity in 2019. It has a heat supply capacity of 816 GJ/h and annual heat generation of 2,597 TJ in 2020.

== Fuel ==
The power plant receives coal for its fuel from Ulaan Ovoo coal mine in Tüshig District, Selenge Province.

== See also ==
- List of power stations in Mongolia
