= Salkhit Wind Farm =

Wind farm in Töv, Mongolia

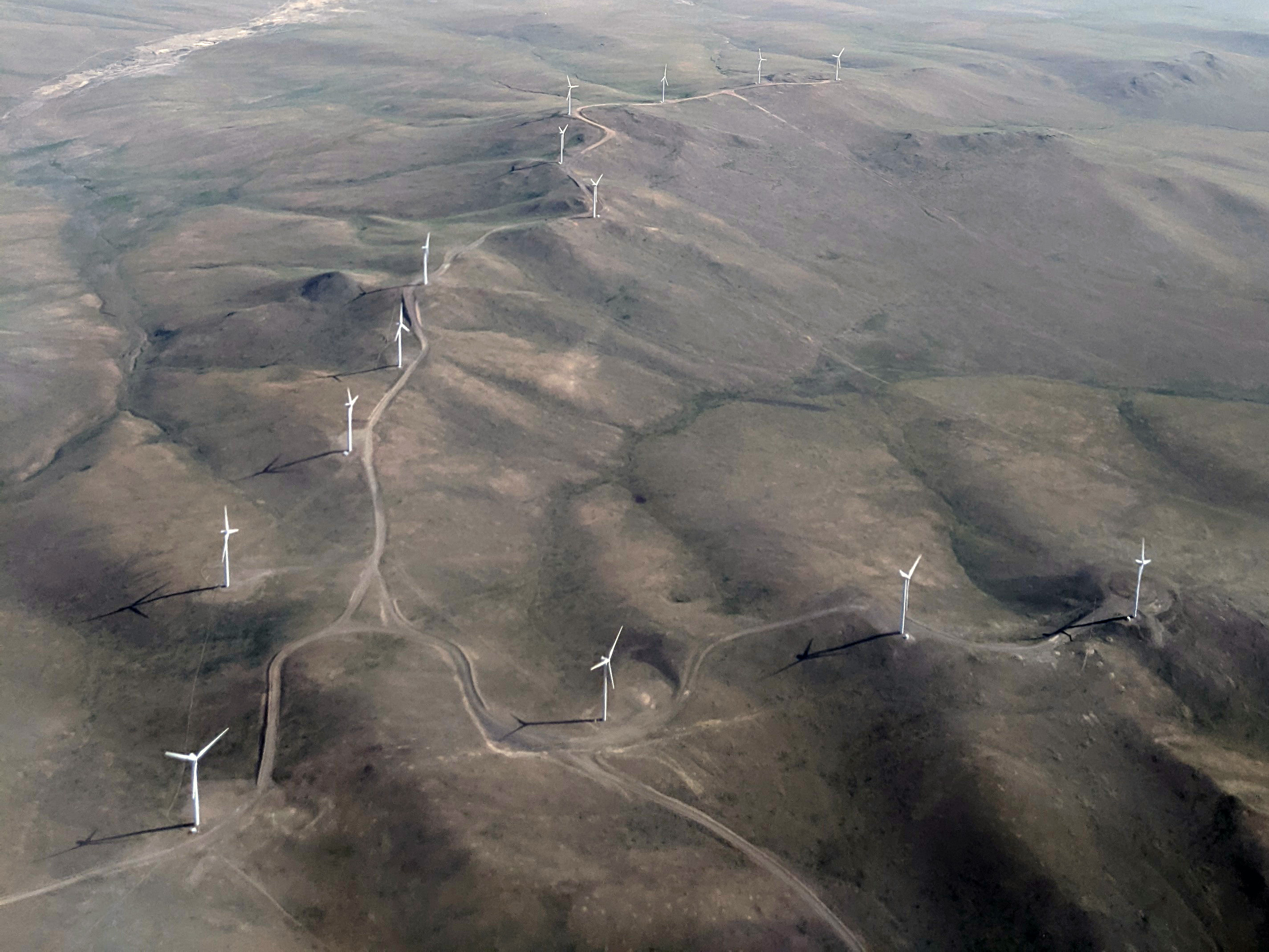
- Official name: Салхит Салхин Цахилгаан Станцын
- Country: Mongolia
- Location: Töv, Mongolia
- Coordinates: 47°33′54.0″N 107°12′23.4″E
- Status: Operational
- Commission date: June 2013
- Construction cost: US$122 million
- Owner: Clean Energy

Wind farm
- Hub height: 80 m
- Rotor diameter: 82.5 m

Power generation
- Units operational: 31
- Nameplate capacity: 49.6 MW
- Annual net output: 168,500 MWh

External links
- Commons: Related media on Commons

The Salkhit Wind Farm (Mongolian: Салхит Салхин Цахилгаан Станцын) is a 49.6 MW wind farm in Töv Province, Mongolia.

== History ==
The wind farm was commissioned in June 2013 as the first wind farm constructed in the country. It was constructed with a cost of US$122 million.

== Technical specifications ==
The wind farm consists of 31 wind turbines with individual 1.6 MW nameplate capacity. The wind turbine hub height is 80 meters and the blade diameter is 82.5 m.

== See also ==
- Renewable energy in Mongolia
- List of power stations in Mongolia
