= Buuruljuut Power Plant =

Coal-fired power plant in Bayanjargalan, Töv, Mongolia

- Official name: Бөөрөлжүүтийн цахилгаан станц
- Country: Mongolia
- Location: Bayanjargalan, Töv
- Coordinates: 47°16′23.5″N 107°53′26.7″E
- Status: Under construction
- Construction began: 2022
- Commission date: 5 October 2024 (unit 1); October 2025 (unit 2)
- Construction cost: MNT300 billion
- Owners: Tsetsens Mining and Energy

Thermal power station
- Primary fuel: Coal
- Turbine technology: Steam turbine

Power generation
- Units operational: 2
- Units planned: 4
- Nameplate capacity: 300 MW
- Annual net output: 2.4 billion kWh

External links
- Website: Official website

The Buuruljuut Power Plant (Mongolian: Бөөрөлжүүтийн цахилгаан станц) is a coal-fired power station in Bayanjargalan District, Töv Province, Mongolia.

== History ==
Feasibility study to construct the power plant was carried out in 2016–2020. Construction then started in 2022. The first unit of the power plant was commissioned on 5 October 2024 with an installed capacity of 150 MW. On 17 November 2024, a fire broke out on one of its coal conveyor. In December 2024, the power plant was connected to the national grid of the country.

The second unit was commissioned in October 2025, bringing the total installed generation capacity of the plant to 300 MW. It is expected to produce 2.4 billion kWh of electricity annually.

== Technical specifications ==
The power plant is a coal-fired plant which will have a full installed capacity of 600 MW from four generation units. Each generation unit is 150 MW.

== Finance ==
The power plant is constructed with a cost of MNT300 billion. It is developed and owned by Tsetsens Mining and Energy.

== See also ==
- List of power stations in Mongolia
