= Bayanjargalan, Töv =

District in Töv, Mongolia

Coordinates: 47°10′46″N 108°15′40″E

Bayanjargalan District Баянжаргалан сум ᠪᠠᠶ᠋ᠠᠨᠵᠢᠷᠭᠠᠯᠠᠩᠰᠤᠮᠤ
- District
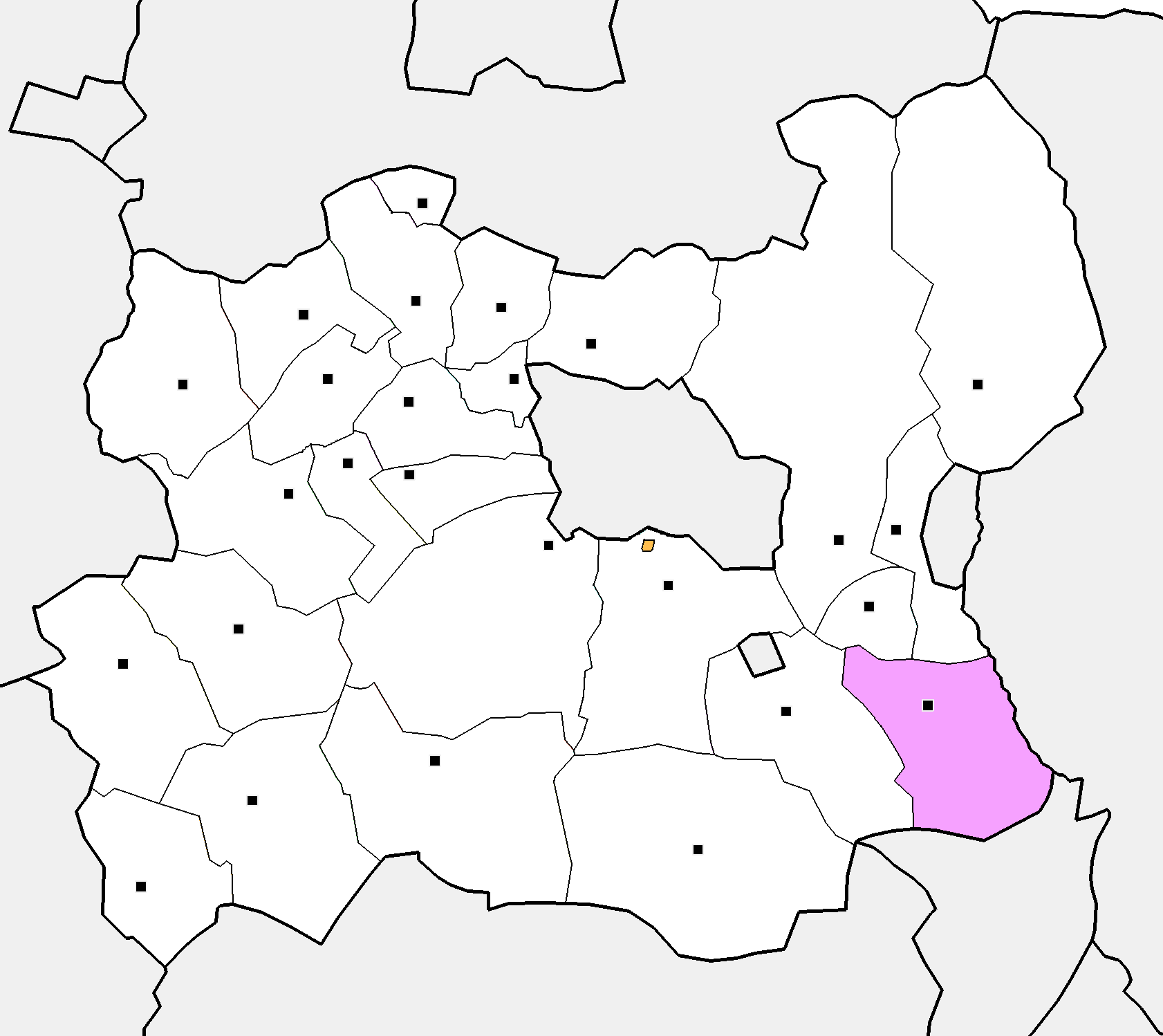
- Bayanjargalan District in Töv Province
- Country: Mongolia
- Province: Töv Province
- Time zone: UTC+8 (UTC + 8)

Bayanjargalan (Баянжаргалан, Rich happiness) is a sum of Töv Province in Mongolia.

== Geography ==
The district has a total area of 2,376 km^{2}.

== Administrative divisions ==
The district is divided into three bags, which are:

- Erdene
- Jargalant
- Ulaan ukhaa

== Infrastructures ==
- Buuruljuut Power Plant
