= Baganuur Coal Mine =

Coal mine in Baganuur, Ulaanbaatar, Mongolia

- Location within Mongolia
- Location: Baganuur, Ulaanbaatar, Mongolia; 47°43′12.8″N 108°18′30.6″E
- Products: coal
- Production: 4.4 million tons (2022)
- Opened: 1978

The Baganuur Coal Mine is a coal mine in Baganuur, Ulaanbaatar, Mongolia.

== History ==
Scientists from the Soviet Union began the work for the coal development of the mine in 1975. The mining of the coal finally began in 1978. In 1981, the dewatering system was installed at the mine. In 1997, the Baganuur Coal Mine Development Project was established. In 1999, the mine begin rehabilitation and renovation. In 2020, the mine underwent another renovation.

== Geology ==
The mine has a length of 12 km and width of 4–5 km. It is a surface coal mine. It has an estimated coal resource of 812 million tons and methane resource of 1.64 billion m^{3}.

== See also ==
- Mining in Mongolia
