= Dalanzadgad Thermal Power Plant =

Coal-fired power plant in Dalanzadgad, Ömnögovi, Mongolia

- Official name: Даланзадгадын Дулааны Цахилгаан Станц
- Country: Mongolia
- Location: Dalanzadgad, Ömnögovi
- Coordinates: 43°34′11.0″N 104°26′07.0″E
- Status: Operational
- Commission date: 2000
- Construction cost: US$9.3 million

Thermal power station
- Primary fuel: Coal
- Turbine technology: Steam turbine

Power generation
- Nameplate capacity: 6 MW
- Annual net output: 30 GWh

The Dalanzadgad Thermal Power Plant (Mongolian: Даланзадгадын Дулааны Цахилгаан Станц) is a coal-fired power station in Dalanzadgad, Ömnögovi Province, Mongolia.

== History ==
The power plant was commissioned in 2000 with support from Korea's Economic Development Cooperation Fund. It was constructed by Hyundai Engineering. In 2011, the power plant was expanded. On 18 December 2011, the power plant's turbine had broken down and the plant stopped working on 10 January 2012.

== Technical specifications ==
The power plant has an installed generation capacity of 6 MW. It generated 30 GWh of electricity in 2010.

== Finance ==
The power plant was constructed with a cost of US$9.3 million, which was lent as soft loan by the Government of South Korea.

== See also ==
- List of power stations in Mongolia
