= Darkhan Solar Power Plant =

Photovoltaic power plant in Darkhan-Uul, Mongolia

- Official name: Дархан Нарны Цахилгаан Станц
- Country: Mongolia
- Location: Khongor, Darkhan-Uul Province
- Coordinates: 49°24′01.5″N 105°56′27.4″E
- Status: Operational
- Construction began: August 2016
- Commission date: 1 January 2017
- Construction cost: US$18.3 million

Power generation
- Nameplate capacity: 10 MW
- Annual net output: 15.2 GWh

The Darkhan Solar Power Plant (Mongolian: Дархан Нарны Цахилгаан Станц) is a photovoltaic power station in Khongor, Darkhan-Uul Province, Mongolia. It is the first solar farm in Mongolia.

== History ==
In July 2016, the signing ceremony between participating companies to construct the power plant was held in Ulaanbaatar. The construction of the power plant began in August 2016. Installation of the PV modules started on 17 September 2016 and completed on 22 October 2016. The power plant started its commercial operation on 1 January 2017. The completion ceremony was held on 19 January 2017, making it the first solar power plant in the country. It was constructed with a cost of US$18.3 million.

== Architecture ==
The power plant covers an area of 29 hectares.

== Technical specifications ==
The power plant has a total generating capacity of 10 MW. A total of 32,000 PV panels in 72 series were installed, with each PV panel has a maximum output of 310 W with efficiency of 15.9%. It has an annual generation of 15.2 GWh of electricity.

== See also ==
- List of power stations in Mongolia
