= Amgalan Thermal Power Plant =

Coal-fired power plant in Bayanzürkh, Ulaanbaatar, Mongolia

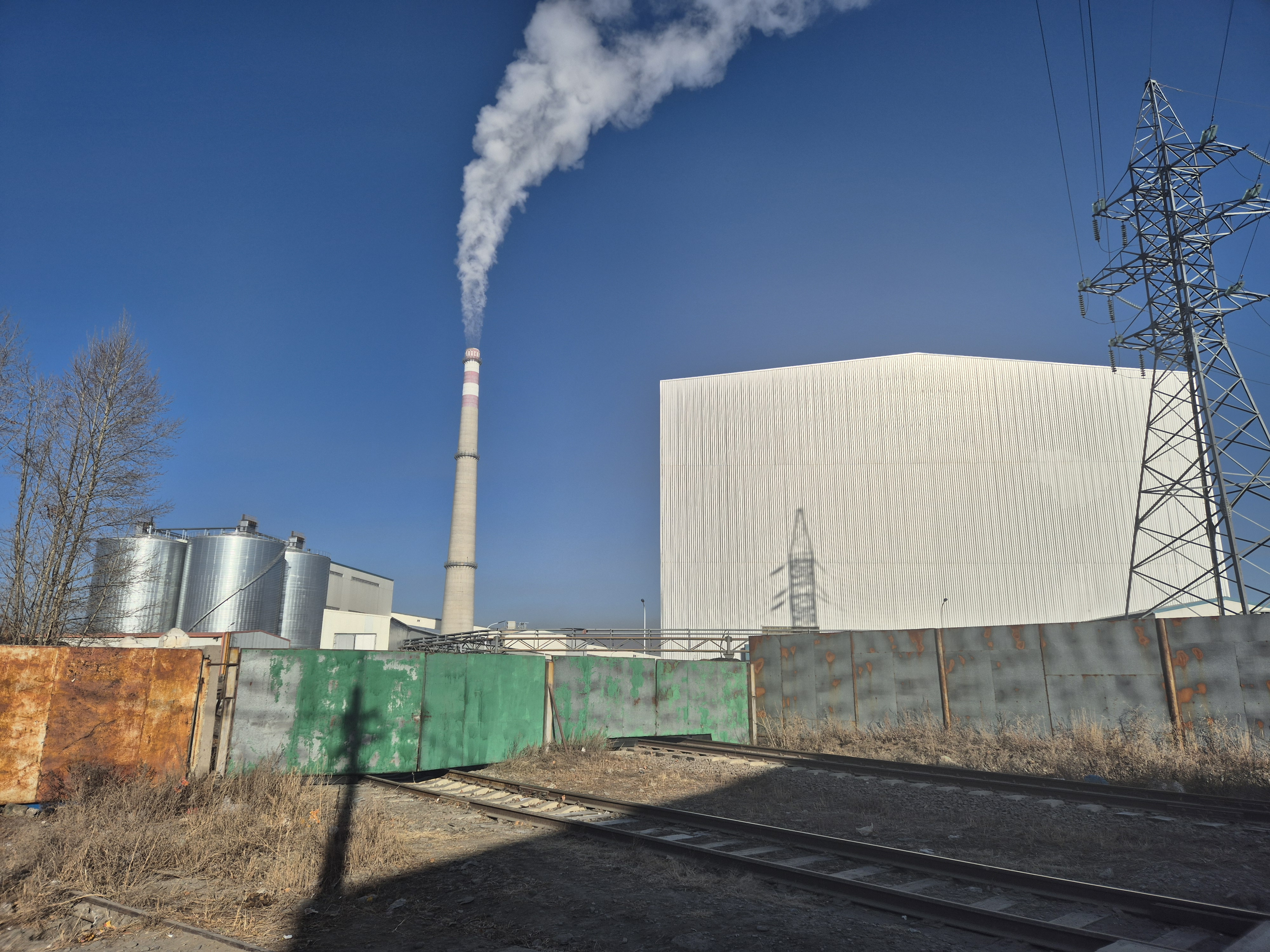
- Official name: Амгалан Дулааны Cтанц
- Country: Mongolia
- Location: Bayanzürkh, Ulaanbaatar
- Coordinates: 47°54′59.7″N 107°00′16.8″E
- Status: Operational
- Commission date: November 2015
- Construction cost: US$75.9 million

Thermal power station
- Primary fuel: Coal
- Turbine technology: Steam turbine

Power generation
- Units operational: 3 X 116 MW
- Nameplate capacity: 348 MW

The Amgalan Thermal Power Plant (Mongolian: Амгалан Дулааны Cтанц) is a coal-fired power station in Bayanzürkh, Ulaanbaatar, Mongolia.

== History ==
The power plant was commissioned in November 2015. On 4 December 2015, the opening of the power plant was officiated in a ceremony preceded by Energy Minister Dashzeveg Zorigt and other government officials. In June 2022, expansion work of the power plant started to expand its generating capacity.

== Technical specifications ==
The power plant has an installed capacity of 348 MW. It consists of three steam turbine with each rated at 116 MW. The power plant supplies electricity mostly to the eastern part of Ulaanbaatar. It also acts as a district heating for Ulaanbaatar.

== Finance ==
The power plant was constructed with a cost of US$75.9 million. It was built with a concession with China Machinery Engineering Corporation.

== See also ==
- List of power stations in Mongolia
