= Thermal Power Plant No. 3 (Ulaanbaatar) =

Coal-fired power plant in Khan Uul, Ulaanbaatar, Mongolia

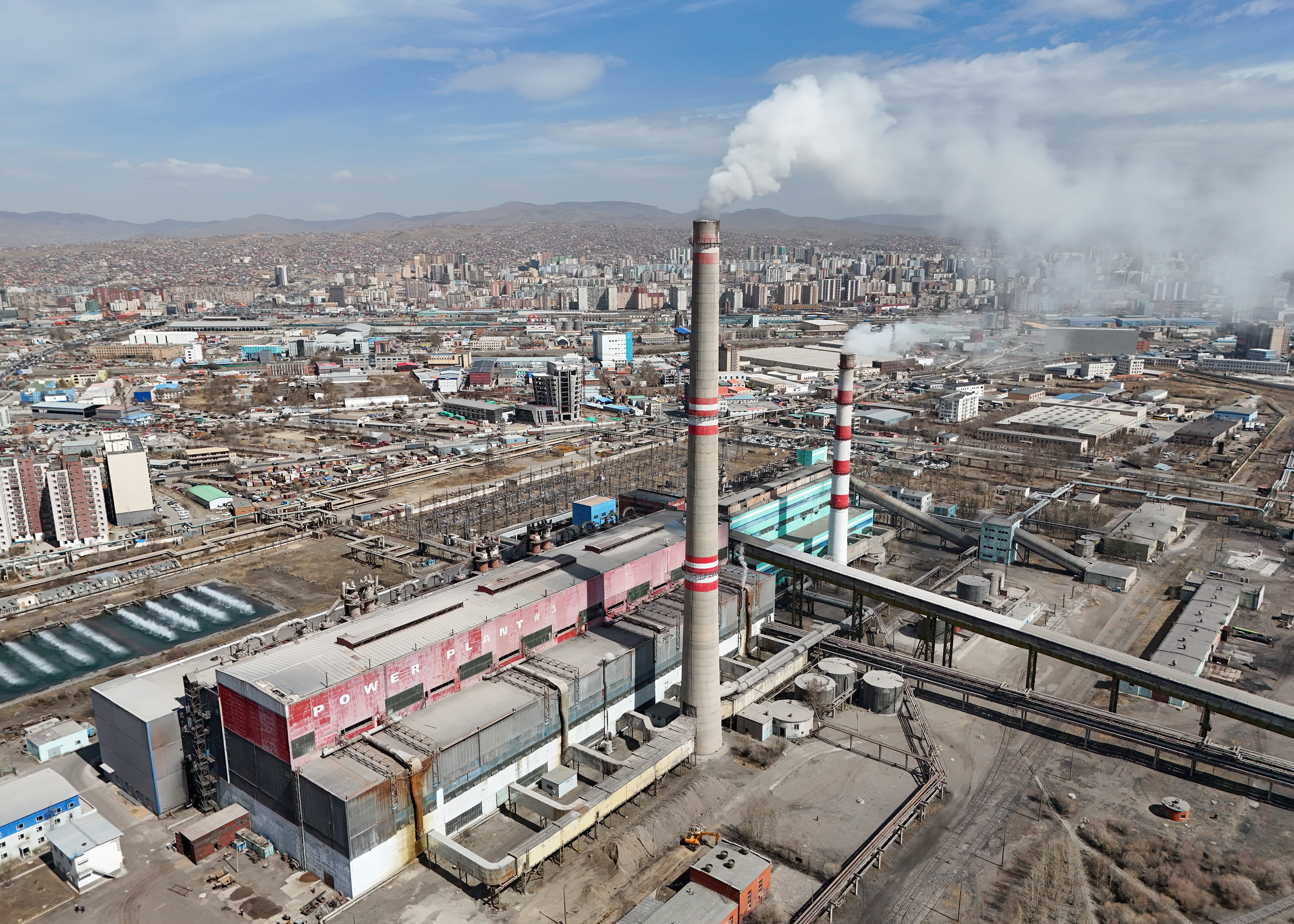
- Official name: Улаанбаатарын ДЦС-3
- Country: Mongolia
- Location: Khan Uul, Ulaanbaatar
- Coordinates: 47°53′45.8″N 106°51′50.7″E
- Status: Operational
- Commission date: 1968

Thermal power station
- Primary fuel: Coal
- Turbine technology: Steam turbine
- Cogeneration?: yes

Power generation
- Nameplate capacity: 198 MW

External links
- Commons: Related media on Commons

The Thermal Power Plant No. 3 (Mongolian: Улаанбаатарын ДЦС-3) is a coal-fired cogeneration power station in Khan Uul, Ulaanbaatar, Mongolia. The plant is responsible for 32% of Ulaanbaatar's heat and 16% of the central region's electricity.

== History ==
The power station was commissioned in 1968. In 2014, an additional 50 MW of generation capacity of the power station was commissioned. In September 2024, Mongolia and Russia signed an agreement where the Russian company Inter RAO is expected to modernize and reconstruct the power station for 1.3 billion euros.

On 2 June 2025, a fire severely damaged the high-pressure turbine hall of the power station, disrupting nearly one-third of the city’s district heating and 13% of its electricity supply.

== Technical specifications ==
The power station has an installed generation capacity of 198 MW. In 2023, the power station used a total of 9.4 million m^{3} of water to generate power. It also acts as a district heating for Ulaanbaatar. It has a heat supply capacity of 2,449 GJ/h and annual heat generation of 10,074 TJ in 2020.

== See also ==
- List of power stations in Mongolia
