= Tüshig =

District in Selenge Province, Mongolia

Coordinates: 50°19′13″N 105°02′35″E

Tüshig District Түшиг сум ᠲᠦᠱᠢᠭᠰᠤᠮᠤ
- District
- Interactive map of Tüshig District
- Country: Mongolia
- Province: Selenge Province

Area
  - Total: 2,492.82 km^{2} (962.48 sq mi)
- Time zone: UTC+8 (UTC + 8)

Tüshig (Mongolian: Түшиг "reliance") is a sum (district) of Selenge Province in northern Mongolia. In 2008, its population was 1,420.

== Administrative divisions ==
The district is divided into two bags, which are:

- Ar Nuga
- Jargalmandakh
