= List of power stations in Mongolia =

The following page lists all power stations in Mongolia.

Location of power stations in Mongolia, coal/oil/gas, hydroelectric, photovoltaic, wind, former

== Coal ==
Power plant	Coordinates	Capacity (MW)	Units	Notes
Amgalan	47°54′59.7″N 107°00′16.8″E	348	3 x 116 MW	
Buuruljuut	47°16′23.5″N 107°53′26.7″E	300	2 x 150 MW	
Ulaanbaatar TPP-4	47°53′39.9″N 106°48′14.2″E	700	3 x 100 MW, 3 x 80 MW	
Ulaanbaatar TPP-3	47°53′45.8″N 106°51′50.7″E	198	4 x 25 MW, 4 x 12 MW, 1 x 50 MW	
Darkhan	49°26′12.9″N 105°57′28.9″E	48	4 x 12 MW	
Choibalsan	48°04′44.5″N 114°33′15.9″E	36	2 x 12 MW, 2 x 6 MW	
Erdenet	49°02′27.3″N 104°05′52.8″E	28.8	1 x 12 MW, 2 x 8.4 MW	
Ukhaa Khudag	43°40′20.2″N 105°32′22.7″E	18		
Toson	48°45′17.1″N 98°14′46.1″E	24		
Ulaanbaatar TPP-2	47°54′19.4″N 106°48′27.2″E	21.5	1 x 12 MW, 1 x 6 MW, 1 x 3.5 MW	
Dalanzadgad	43°34′11.0″N 104°26′07.0″E	6	2 x 3 MW	

== Hydroelectric ==
Power plant	Coordinates	Capacity (MW)	Units	Year completed
Durgun	48°19′34.0″N 92°48′25.0″E	12		2008
Taishir	46°41′38.6″N 96°39′57.7″E	10.35	3 x 3.45 MW	2008

== Photovoltaic ==
Power plant	Coordinates	Capacity (MW)	Units	Year completed
Bukhug Solar Power Plant	47°37′12.6″N 106°43′37.1″E	15		2019
Darkhan Solar Power Plant	49°24′01.5″N 105°56′27.4″E	10		2017
Gobi Solar Power Plant	44°54′37.5″N 110°11′52.2″E	30		2019
Gegeen Solar Power Plant	43°43′30.4″N 111°49′36.2″E	16.5		2018
Khovd Nar Solar Power Plant	48°15′09.1″N 91°55′40.2″E	10		2022
Monnaran Solar Power Plant	48°01′54.4″N 106°30′49.6″E	10		2017
Murun 10MW Solar Power Plant	49°36′37.5″N 100°12′37.6″E	10		2023
Sumber Solar Power Plant	46°19′05.6″N 108°21′08.8″E	10		2019

== Wind ==
Wind farm	Coordinates	Aerogenerators	Capacity (MW)	Year completed
Sainshand	44°54′56.8″N 110°14′15.4″E	25 x 2.2 MW	55	2018
Salkhit	47°33′54.0″N 107°12′23.4″E	31 x 1.6 MW	49.6	2013
Tsetsii	43°33′35.4″N 105°36′48.6″E	25 x 2.0 MW	50	2017
