= Geography of Mongolia =

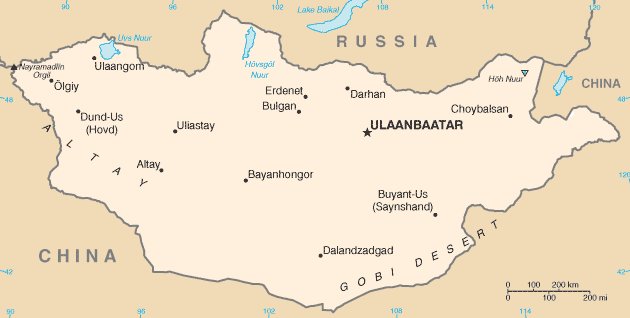
- Map showing the major cities and the neighbouring countries of Mongolia
- Continent: Asia
- Region: East Asia
- Coordinates: 46°0′N 105°0′E
- Area: Ranked 18
  - Total: 1,564,116 km^{2} (603,909 sq mi)
  - Land: 99.3%
  - Water: 0.7%
- Borders: Russia: 3,485 kilometres (2,165 mi); China: 4,676 kilometres (2,906 mi)
- Highest point: Khüiten Peak; 4,374 m (14,350 ft)
- Lowest point: Hoh Nuur; 560 m (1,840 ft)
- Longest river: Orkhon River; 1,124 kilometres (698 mi)
- Largest lake: Uvs Lake by area: 3,350 km^{2} (1,290 sq mi); Khövsgöl Nuur by volume: 480.7 km^{3} (115.3 cu mi)
- Climate: Desert; continental
- Terrain: Vast semidesert and desert plains, grassy steppe, mountains in west and southwest
- Natural resources: Oil, coal, copper, molybdenum, tungsten, phosphates, tin, nickel, zinc, fluorspar, gold, silver, iron
- Natural hazards: Dust storms; grassland and forest fires; drought
- Environmental issues: Limited natural freshwater; the burning of soft coal for power; poor enforcement of environmental laws; severe air pollution in Ulaanbaatar; deforestation, overgrazing, soil erosion; desertification and poor mining practise

Mongolia is a landlocked country in East Asia, located between China and Russia. The terrain is one of mountains and rolling plateaus, with a high degree of relief. The total land area of Mongolia is 1,564,116 square kilometres. Overall, the land slopes from the high Altai Mountains of the west and the north to plains and depressions in the east and the south. The Khüiten Peak in extreme western Mongolia on the Chinese border is the highest point (4,374 m (14,350 ft)). The lowest point is at 560 m (1,840 ft), is the Hoh Nuur or lake Huh. The country has an average elevation of 1,580 m (5,180 ft).

The landscape includes one of Asia's largest freshwater lakes (Lake Khövsgöl), many salt lakes, marshes, sand dunes, rolling grasslands, alpine forests, and permanent mountain glaciers. Northern and western Mongolia are seismically active zones, with frequent earthquakes and many hot springs and extinct volcanoes. The nation's closest point to any ocean is approximately 645 kilometres (401 mi) from the country's easternmost tip, bordering North China to Jinzhou in Liaoning province, China along the coastline of the Bohai Sea.

== Mountain regions ==
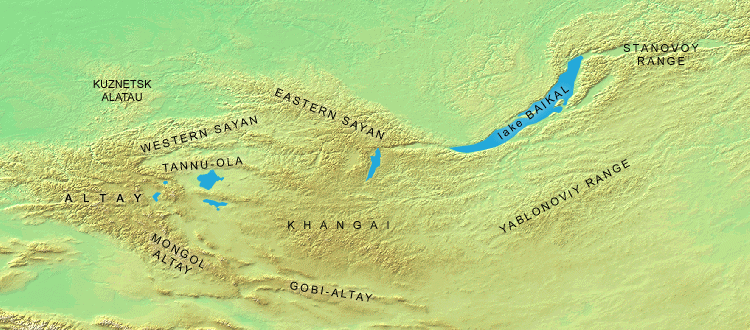
Altai Mountains, Sayan Mountains and Khangai Mountains

Mongolia has four major mountain ranges. The highest is the Altai Mountains, which stretch across the western and southwestern regions of the country on a northwest-to-southeast axis. The range contains the country's highest peak, the 4,374 m (14,350 ft) high Khüiten Peak.

The Khangai Mountains, also trending northwest to southeast, occupy much of central and north-central Mongolia. These are older, lower, and more eroded mountains, with many forests and alpine pastures.

The Khentii Mountains, trending from northeast to southwest for about 400 kilometres (250 mi), occupy central Mongolia's northeastern part. The northern parts are covered in taiga while the southern parts are filled with dry steppe. The range forms the watershed between the Arctic Ocean (via Lake Baikal) and the Pacific Ocean basins. Rivers originating in the range include the Onon, Kherlen, Menza and Tuul. These mountains also house the capital of Ulaanbaatar.

The Khövsgöl Mountains occupy the north of the country. It trends from north to south and generally has a lot of steep peaks. Young mountain range with Alpine characteristics, high gradient, with narrow cliffs.

Much of eastern Mongolia is occupied by a plain and the lowest area is a southwest-to-northeast trending depression that reaches from the Gobi Desert region in the south to the eastern frontier.

== Rivers and lakes ==
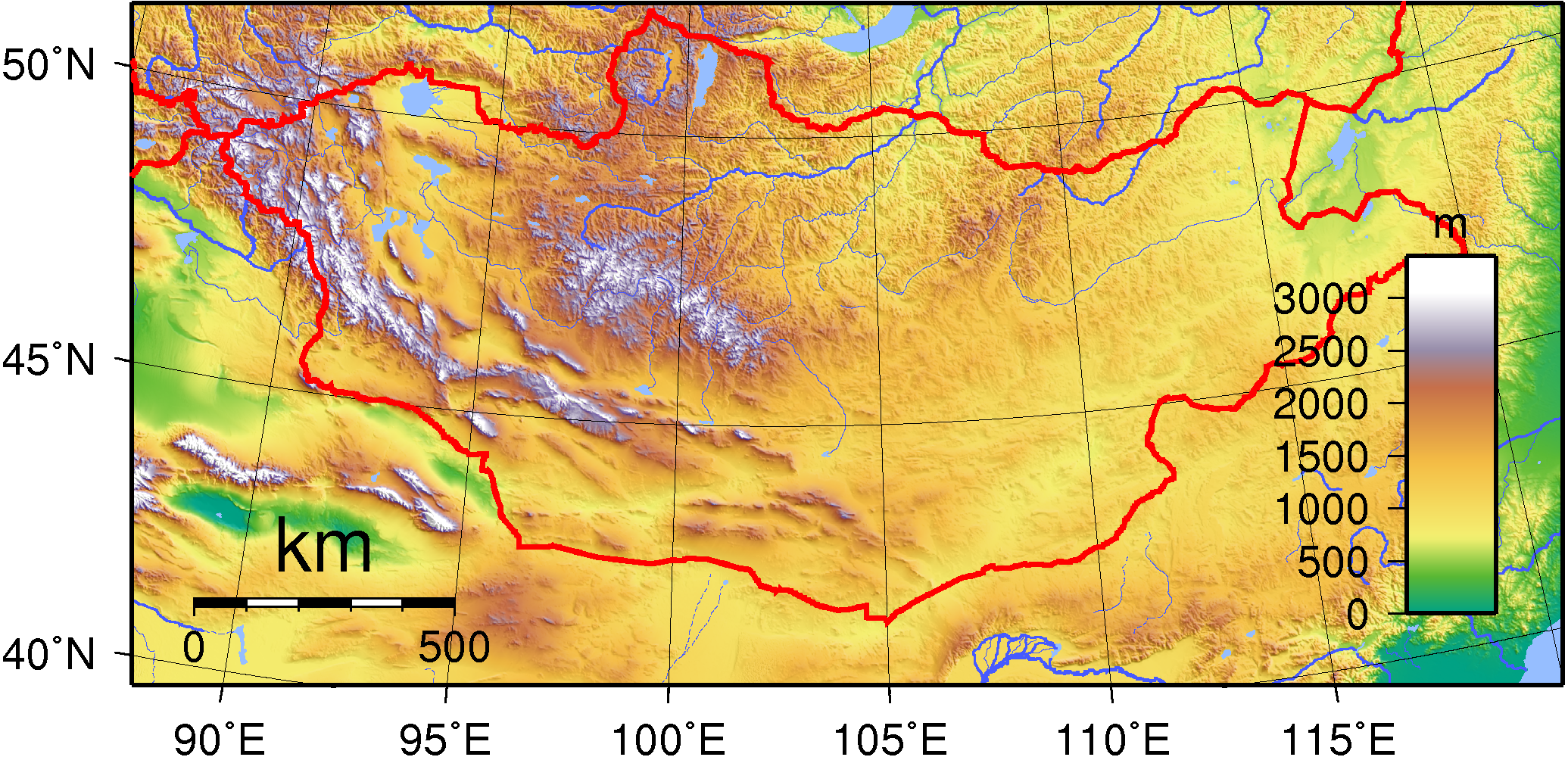
Topography of Mongolia

Some of Mongolia's waterways drain to the oceans, but many finish at endorheic basins in the deserts and the depressions of Inner Asia. Rivers are most extensively developed in the north, and the country's major river system is that of the Selenge, which drains via Lake Baikal to the Arctic Ocean. Some minor tributaries of Siberia's Yenisei River, which also flows to the Arctic Ocean, rise in the mountains of northwestern Mongolia. In northeastern Mongolia the Onon River drains into the Pacific Ocean through the Shilka River in Russia and the Amur (Heilong Jiang) rivers, forming the tenth longest river system in the world.

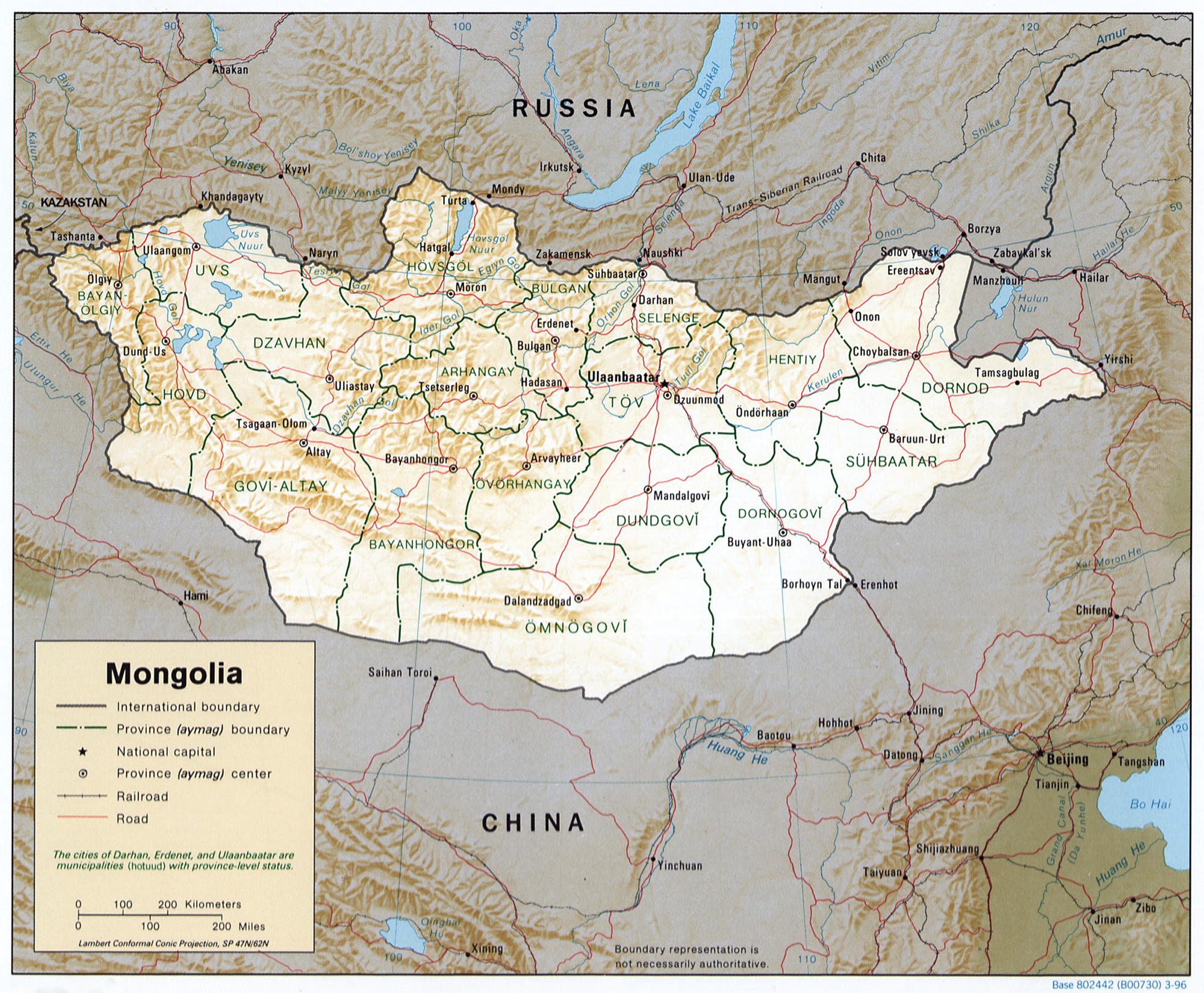
The southern portion of Mongolia is taken up by the Gobi Desert, while the northern and western portions are mountainous.

Many rivers of western Mongolia end at lakes in the Central Asian Internal Drainage Basin, most often in the Great Lakes Depression, or at Hulun Lake, Ulaan Lake or Ulungur Lake. The few streams of southern Mongolia do not reach the sea but run into lakes or deserts.

Mongolia's largest lake by area, Uvs Lake, is in the Great Lakes Depression. Mongolia's largest lake by volume of water, Lake Khövsgöl, drains via the Selenge river to the Arctic Ocean. One of the most easterly lakes of Mongolia, Hoh Nuur, at an elevation of 557 metres, is the lowest point in the country. In total, the lakes and rivers of Mongolia cover 10,560 square kilometres, or 0.67% of the country.

== Climate ==
=== Overview ===
Köppen–Geiger climate classification map at 1-km resolution for Mongolia 1991–2020

Mongolia has a high elevation, with a cold and dry climate. It has an extreme continental climate with long, very cold winters and short summers, during which most precipitation falls. The country averages 257 cloudless days a year, and it is usually at the center of a region of high atmospheric pressure. Precipitation is highest in the north, which averages 200 to 350 millimeters (7.9 to 13.8 in) per year, and lowest in the south, which receives 100 to 200 millimeters (3.9 to 7.9 in). The extreme south is the Gobi Desert, some regions of which receive no precipitation at all in most years. The name Gobi is a Mongol word meaning desert, depression, salt marsh, or steppe, but which usually refers to a category of arid rangeland with insufficient vegetation to support marmots but with enough to support camels. Mongols distinguish Gobi from desert proper, although the distinction is not always apparent to outsiders unfamiliar with the Mongolian landscape. Gobi rangelands are fragile and are easily destroyed by overgrazing, which results in expansion of the true desert, a stony waste where not even Bactrian camels can survive.

Average temperatures over most of the country are below freezing from November through March and are above freezing from April through October. Winter nights can drop to −40 °C (−40.0 °F) in most years. Summer extremes reach as high as 38 °C (100.4 °F) in the southern Gobi region and 33 °C (91.4 °F) in Ulaanbaatar. Most of Mongolia is covered by discontinuous permafrost (grading to continuous at high altitudes), which makes construction, road building, and mining difficult. All rivers and freshwater lakes freeze over in the winter, and smaller streams commonly freeze to the bottom. Ulaanbaatar lies at 1,351 meters (4,432 ft) above sea level in the valley of the Tuul River. Located in the relatively well-watered north, it receives an annual average of 310 millimetres (12.2 in) of precipitation, almost all of which falls in July and in August. Ulaanbaatar has an average annual temperature of −2.9 °C (26.8 °F) and a frost-free period extending on the average from mid-May to late August.

Mongolia's weather is characterized by extreme variability and short-term unpredictability in the summer, and the multiyear averages conceal wide variations in precipitation, dates of frosts, and occurrences of blizzards and spring dust storms. Such weather poses severe challenges to human and livestock survival. Official statistics list less than 1% of the country as arable, 8 to 10% as forest, and the rest as pasture or desert. Grain, mostly wheat, is grown in the valleys of the Selenge river system in the north, but yields fluctuate widely and unpredictably as a result of the amount and the timing of rain and the dates of killing frosts.

Climate data for Ulaanbaatar city weather station (WMO identifier: 44292)
Month	Jan	Feb	Mar	Apr	May	Jun	Jul	Aug	Sep	Oct	Nov	Dec	Year
Record high °C (°F)	−2.6 (27.3)	11.3 (52.3)	17.8 (64.0)	28.0 (82.4)	33.5 (92.3)	38.3 (100.9)	39.0 (102.2)	34.9 (94.8)	31.5 (88.7)	22.5 (72.5)	13.0 (55.4)	6.1 (43.0)	39.0 (102.2)
Mean daily maximum °C (°F)	−15.6 (3.9)	−9.6 (14.7)	−0.7 (30.7)	9.7 (49.5)	17.8 (64.0)	22.5 (72.5)	24.5 (76.1)	22.3 (72.1)	16.7 (62.1)	7.6 (45.7)	−5.0 (23.0)	−13.5 (7.7)	6.4 (43.5)
Daily mean °C (°F)	−21.6 (−6.9)	−16.6 (2.1)	−7.4 (18.7)	2.0 (35.6)	10.1 (50.2)	15.7 (60.3)	18.2 (64.8)	16.0 (60.8)	9.6 (49.3)	0.5 (32.9)	−11.9 (10.6)	−19.0 (−2.2)	−0.4 (31.3)
Mean daily minimum °C (°F)	−25.9 (−14.6)	−22.2 (−8.0)	−13.6 (7.5)	−4.3 (24.3)	3.3 (37.9)	9.6 (49.3)	12.9 (55.2)	10.6 (51.1)	3.6 (38.5)	−4.8 (23.4)	−15.7 (3.7)	−22.9 (−9.2)	−5.8 (21.6)
Record low °C (°F)	−42.2 (−44.0)	−42.2 (−44.0)	−38.9 (−38.0)	−26.1 (−15.0)	−16.1 (3.0)	−3.9 (25.0)	−0.2 (31.6)	−2.2 (28.0)	−13.4 (7.9)	−22.0 (−7.6)	−37.0 (−34.6)	−37.8 (−36.0)	−42.2 (−44.0)
Average precipitation mm (inches)	2 (0.1)	3 (0.1)	4 (0.2)	10 (0.4)	21 (0.8)	46 (1.8)	64 (2.5)	70 (2.8)	27 (1.1)	10 (0.4)	6 (0.2)	4 (0.2)	267 (10.5)
Average rainy days	0.1	0.03	0.2	2	7	13	16	14	8	2	0.2	0.2	63
Average snowy days	8	7	7	7	3	0.3	0.2	0.4	2	6	8	10	59
Average relative humidity (%)	78	73	61	48	46	54	60	63	59	60	71	78	62
Mean monthly sunshine hours	179.1	204.8	265.2	262.5	299.3	269.0	249.3	258.3	245.7	227.5	177.4	156.4	2,794.5
Source 1: Pogoda.ru.net
Source 2: NOAA (sun, 1961–1990)

Climate data for Choibalsan
Month	Jan	Feb	Mar	Apr	May	Jun	Jul	Aug	Sep	Oct	Nov	Dec	Year
Record high °C (°F)	1.3 (34.3)	8.4 (47.1)	21.4 (70.5)	29.5 (85.1)	36.8 (98.2)	41.2 (106.2)	39.1 (102.4)	38.3 (100.9)	31.6 (88.9)	28.0 (82.4)	15.2 (59.4)	3.5 (38.3)	41.2 (106.2)
Mean daily maximum °C (°F)	−14.4 (6.1)	−10.7 (12.7)	−0.5 (31.1)	10.5 (50.9)	19.0 (66.2)	24.9 (76.8)	26.6 (79.9)	24.4 (75.9)	18.0 (64.4)	8.8 (47.8)	−3.4 (25.9)	−11.8 (10.8)	7.6 (45.7)
Daily mean °C (°F)	−20.5 (−4.9)	−17.7 (0.1)	−7.8 (18.0)	2.6 (36.7)	11.3 (52.3)	17.6 (63.7)	19.8 (67.6)	17.9 (64.2)	10.6 (51.1)	1.5 (34.7)	−9.8 (14.4)	−17.6 (0.3)	0.7 (33.2)
Mean daily minimum °C (°F)	−25.5 (−13.9)	−23.9 (−11.0)	−14.8 (5.4)	−4.1 (24.6)	3.8 (38.8)	10.8 (51.4)	14.4 (57.9)	12.1 (53.8)	4.9 (40.8)	−4.2 (24.4)	−15.2 (4.6)	−22.7 (−8.9)	−5.4 (22.3)
Record low °C (°F)	−41.6 (−42.9)	−38.3 (−36.9)	−36.6 (−33.9)	−20.3 (−4.5)	−8.7 (16.3)	0.5 (32.9)	4.4 (39.9)	2.1 (35.8)	−6.0 (21.2)	−20.3 (−4.5)	−29.9 (−21.8)	−36.4 (−33.5)	−41.6 (−42.9)
Average precipitation mm (inches)	1.6 (0.06)	1.9 (0.07)	2.9 (0.11)	6.3 (0.25)	14.4 (0.57)	39.0 (1.54)	57.4 (2.26)	43.3 (1.70)	27.2 (1.07)	7.7 (0.30)	3.3 (0.13)	2.6 (0.10)	207.6 (8.16)
Average precipitation days (≥ 1.0 mm)	0.6	1.0	0.7	1.6	3.2	5.7	8.7	8.1	4.6	1.6	1.1	0.9	37.8
Mean monthly sunshine hours	198.5	212.0	266.1	264.0	294.9	307.3	297.9	287.1	258.2	239.2	199.5	177.6	3,002.3
Source: NOAA (1961-1990)

=== Zud ===
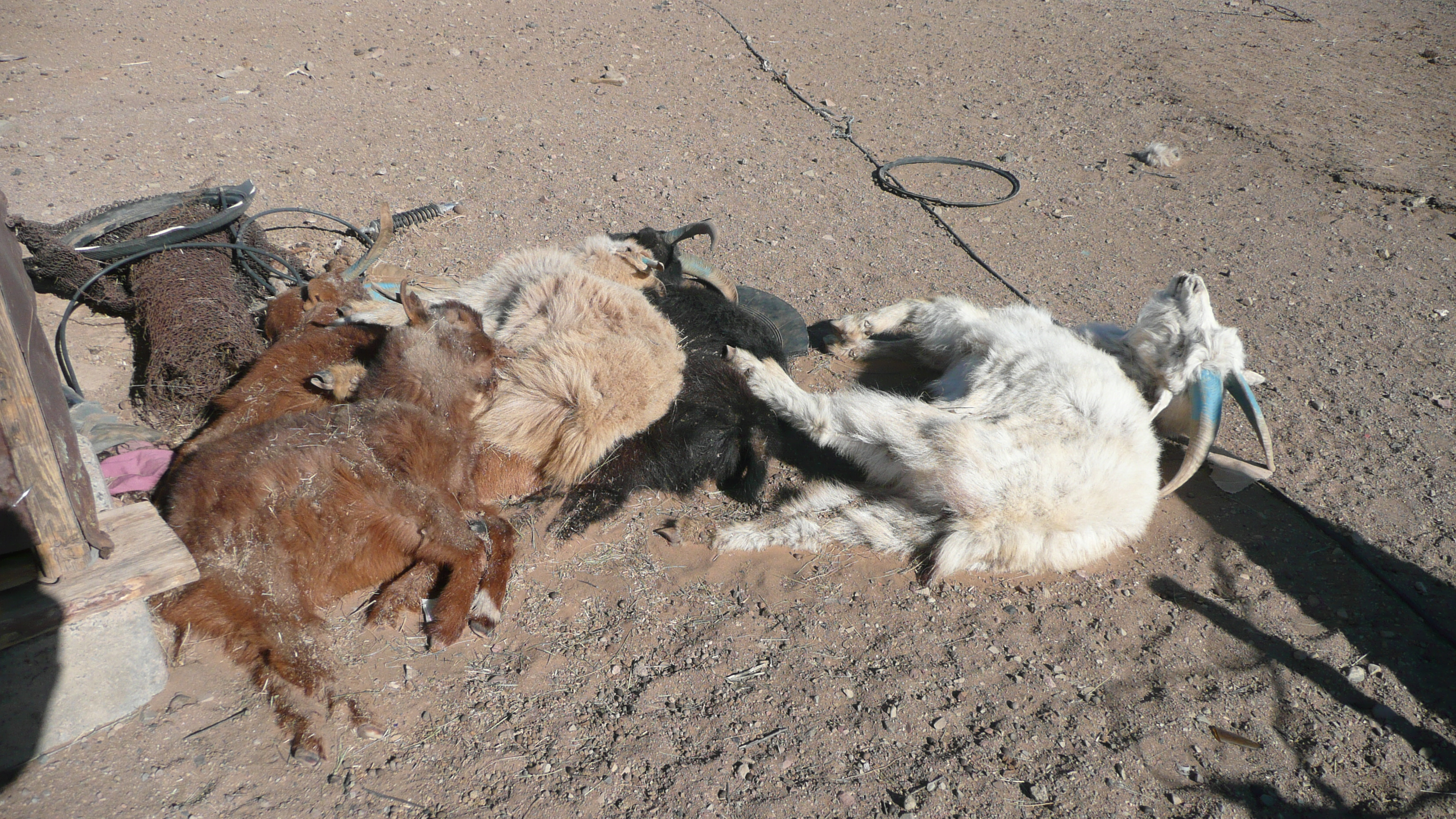
Goats that died as result of a zud

Although winters are generally cold and clear, and livestock can survive, under various weather conditions livestock are unable to graze and die in large numbers. A winter in which this occurs is known as a zud; causes include blizzards, drought, extreme cold, and freezing rain. Such losses of livestock, which are an inevitable and, in a sense, normal consequence of the climate, have made it difficult for planned increases in livestock numbers to be achieved.

=== Seasonal blizzards ===
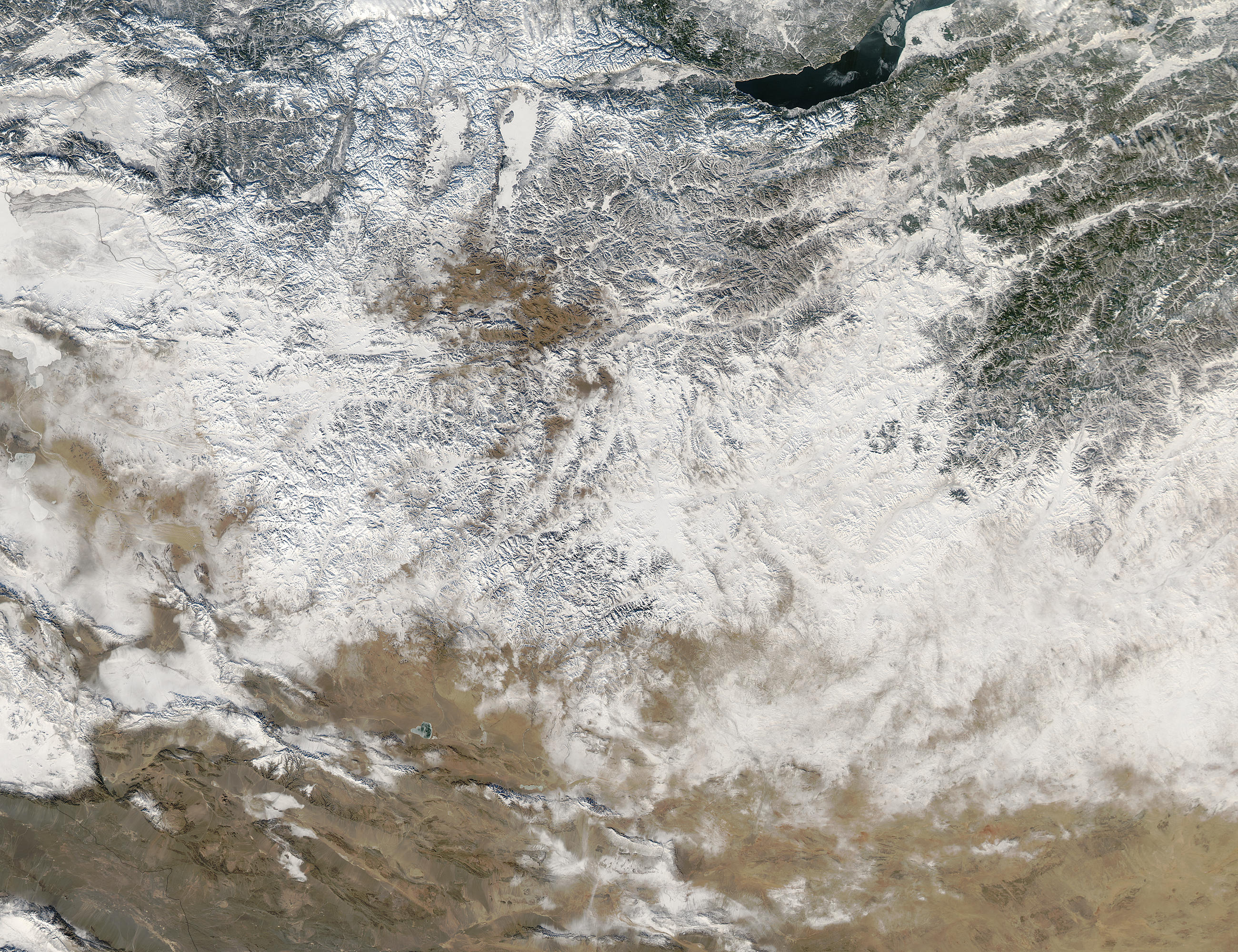
Snow covers Mongolia in patches in this image from December 21, 2003. Snowfall is normally light and blows away quickly during the winter, so to see this much snow on the ground at once is rather unusual.

Severe blizzards can occur in the region. The winters of 1970–1971, 2000–2001, 2008–2009 and 2009–2010 were particularly harsh, featuring extremely severe zuds.

The blizzards of December 2011 blocked many roads, and killed 16,000 livestock and 10 people. The Mongolian State Emergency Commission said it was the coldest winter in thirty years and, like the preceding harsh summer drought, could have been the result of global warming. The United Nations provided major aid due to the high level of damage caused.

In the snowstorms between the 8 and 28 May 2008, 21 people were killed and 100 others went missing in seven provinces in eastern Mongolia. The toll finally reached at least 52 people and 200,000 livestock by the end of June. Most of the victims were herders who froze to death along with their livestock. It was the worst cold snap since the founding of the modern state in 1922.

Snowstorms in December 2009 – February 2010 also killed 8,000,000 livestock and 60 people.

=== Climate change ===
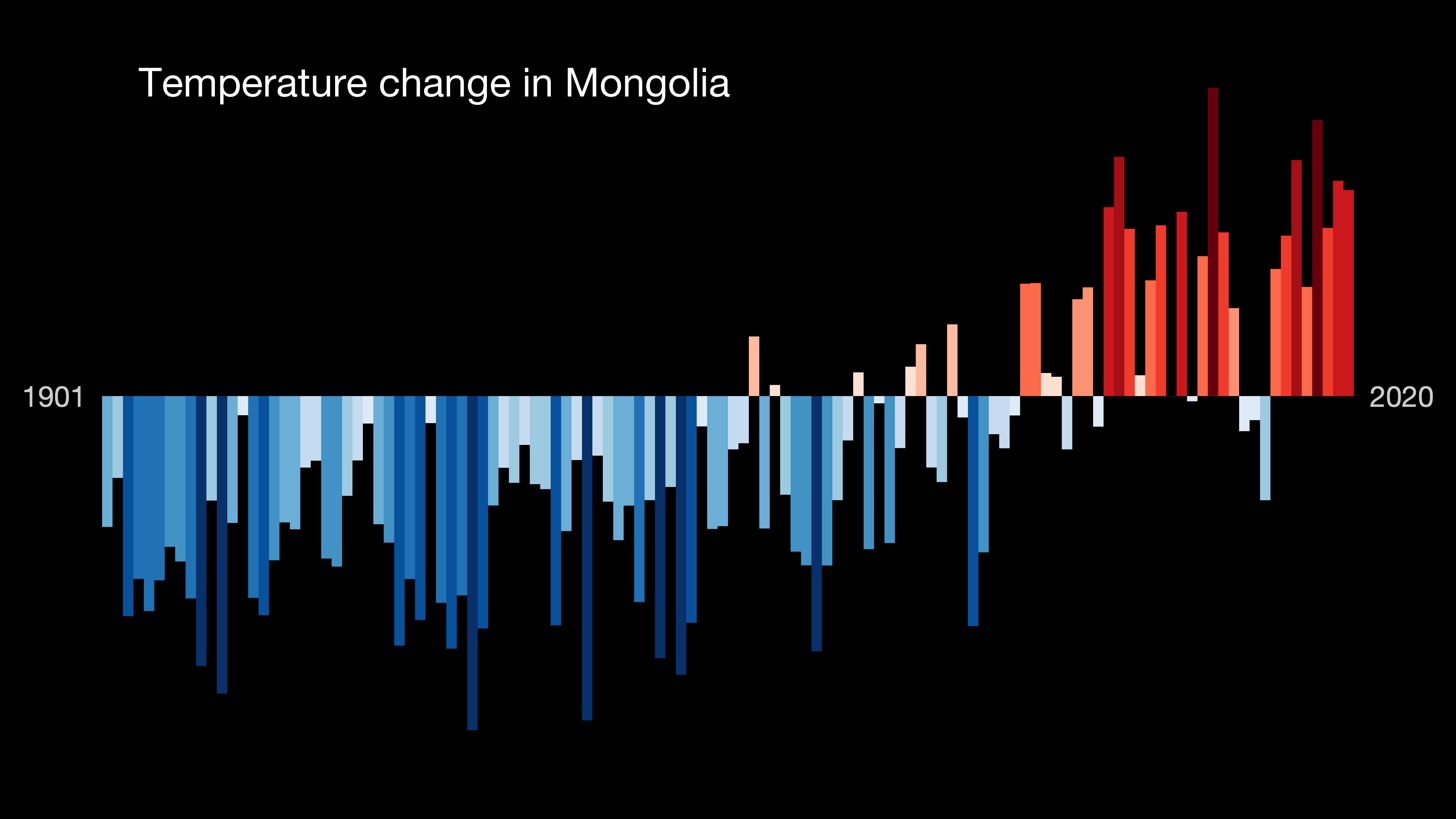
Visualisation of temperature change in Mongolia, 1901 to 2020.

Climate change has threatened the ways of life for traditional pastoralist herders, as it is a driving factor of disruptive dzuds and gans, also known as extreme climatic events or natural disasters. Winter storms, drought periods, and extreme temperatures have become more frequent. Leading up to 2000, there were approximately 20 extreme events per year, but since 2000, this number has doubled to 40 events per year. Between 2008 and 2010 Mongolia experienced 153 extreme events, most of which being strong winds, storms, and floods from run-off.

Since 1940, the average year wise temperature in Mongolia has increased by at least 1.8 °C. This temperature shift is deemed responsible for an increase in grassland aridity, and as a result, a lowering of the production of biomass. The Gobi desert is expected to creep northward at approximately 6–7 km / year, which is expected to further limit pastureland.

Another result of these meteorological shifts is expected to be precipitation that occurs in concentrated bursts and cannot be absorbed by the soil. The rising temperatures will also melt high mountain glaciers, degrade permafrost, and will cause more transpiration from plants.

Mongolia, specifically for Ulaanbaatar's vulnerable neighborhoods, is receiving help from the European Investment Bank in converting neighborhoods vulnerable to climate change into more climate-resilient and ecological districts. Plans call for constructing 10,000 houses in 20 environmentally friendly neighborhoods with easy access to businesses and nearby employment. Women-led families in Mongolia will have preferential access to this new green affordable housing, and 40% of workplaces and at least 40% of green mortgage loans will go to women-led companies.

In April 2024, Bloomberg reported that climate change is significantly impacting Mongolia, particularly through the increasing frequency of "dzud" events, with six occurrences in the last decade causing the loss of around 5.9 million animals, or 9% of the country's livestock. The nation has experienced a temperature rise of 2.5 °C over the past 80 years, exacerbating environmental degradation and economic challenges. Despite livestock production accounting for just 10% of GDP, it supports over 80% of the rural populace. The latest dzud event affected almost the entire country, resulting in a 7% increase in Mongolia's consumer price index and higher fodder costs, which also impact the vital cashmere industry. International and national initiatives are focusing on sustainable practices and renewable energy to mitigate these climate change effects.

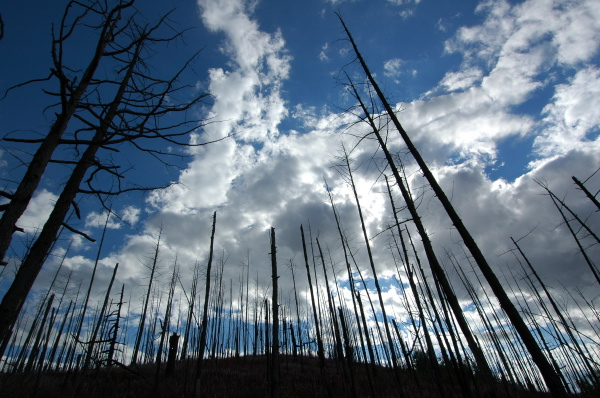
A forest in Mongolia, after a forest fire.

== Ecoregions ==
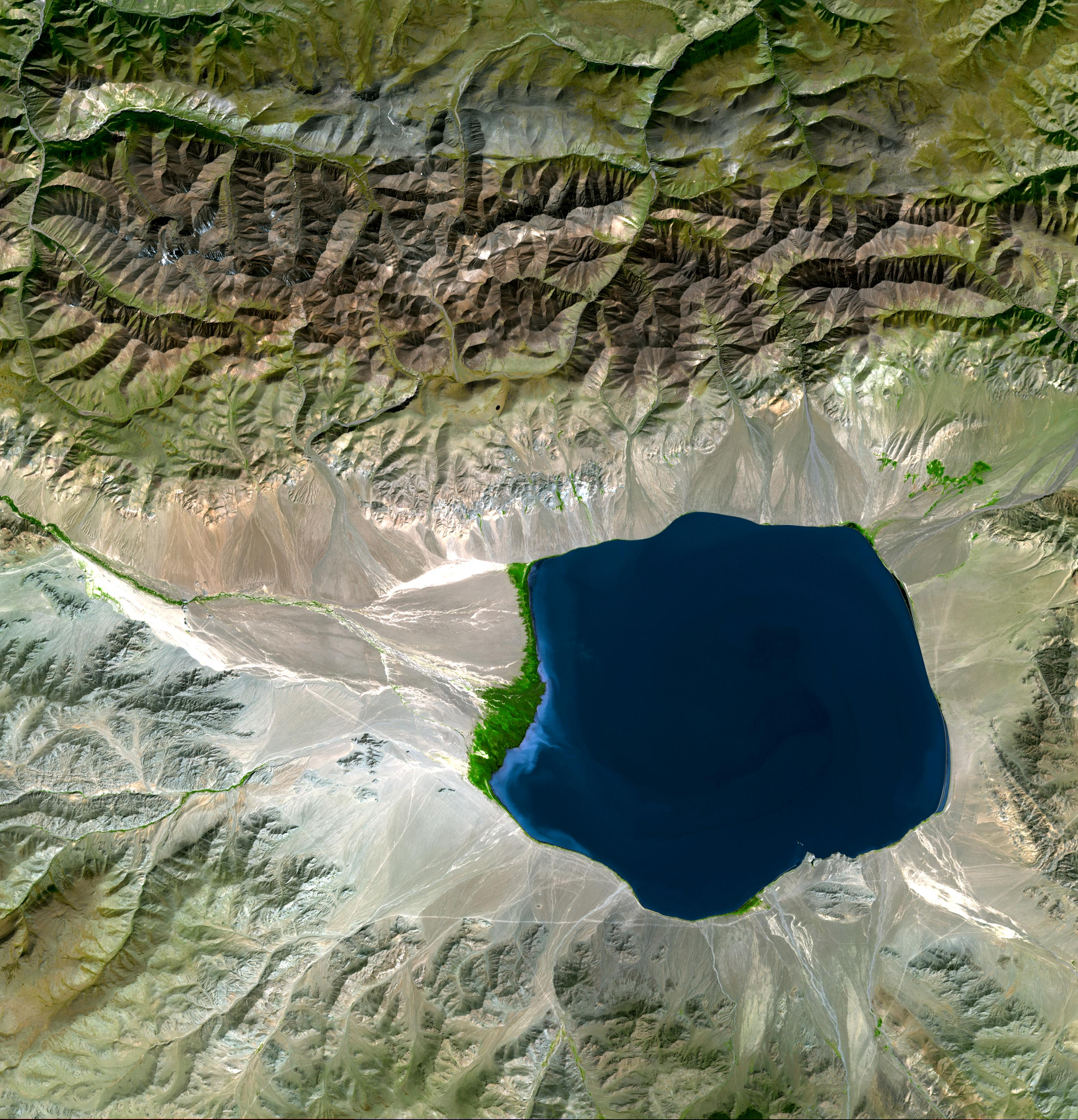
Endorheic lake in Northern Mongolia

- Altai montane forest and forest steppe
- Khangai Mountains conifer forests
- Selenge-Orkhon forest steppe
- Sayan montane conifer forests
- Trans-Baikal conifer forests
- Daurian forest steppe
- Mongolian-Manchurian grassland
- Altai alpine meadow and tundra
- Khangai Mountains alpine meadow
- Sayan alpine meadows and tundra
- Alashan Plateau semi-desert
- Eastern Gobi desert steppe
- Gobi Desert
- Gobi Lakes Valley desert steppe
- Great Lakes Basin desert steppe
- Junggar Basin semi-desert

== Resources and land use ==
Land use:
arable land: 9.10%
permanent crops: 0%
other: 99.61% (2011)

Irrigated land: 843 km^{2} (2011)

Total renewable water resources: 34.8 km^{3} (2011)

== See also ==
- Greater Mongolia
- Mongolian Plateau
- List of reptiles of Mongolia
