= List of ecoregions in Mongolia =

The following is a list of ecoregions in Mongolia, according to the Worldwide Fund for Nature (WWF):

== Terrestrial ==
=== Temperate coniferous forests ===
- Altai montane forest and forest steppe (China, Kazakhstan, Mongolia, Russia)
- Khangai Mountains conifer forests (Mongolia)
- Sayan montane conifer forests (Mongolia, Russia)

=== Boreal forests/taiga ===
- Trans-Baikal conifer forests (Mongolia, Russia)

=== Temperate grasslands, savannas and shrublands ===
- Daurian forest steppe (China, Mongolia, Russia)
- Mongolian–Manchurian grassland (China, Mongolia, Russia)
- Sayan Intermontane steppe (Russia, Mongolia)
- Selenge–Orkhon forest steppe (Mongolia, Russia)

=== Montane grasslands and shrublands ===
- Altai alpine meadow and tundra (China, Kazakhstan, Mongolia, Russia)
- Khangai Mountains alpine meadow (Mongolia)
- Sayan alpine meadows and tundra (Mongolia, Russia)

=== Deserts and xeric shrublands ===
- Alashan Plateau semi-desert (Mongolia, China)
- Eastern Gobi desert steppe (Mongolia, China)
- Gobi Lakes Valley desert steppe (Mongolia, China)
- Great Lakes Basin desert steppe (Mongolia, Russia)
- Junggar Basin semi-desert (China, Mongolia, Kazakhstan)
