= Khangai Nuruu National Park =

National park in Mongolia

- Mongolian: Хангайн нуруу
- IUCN category II (national park)
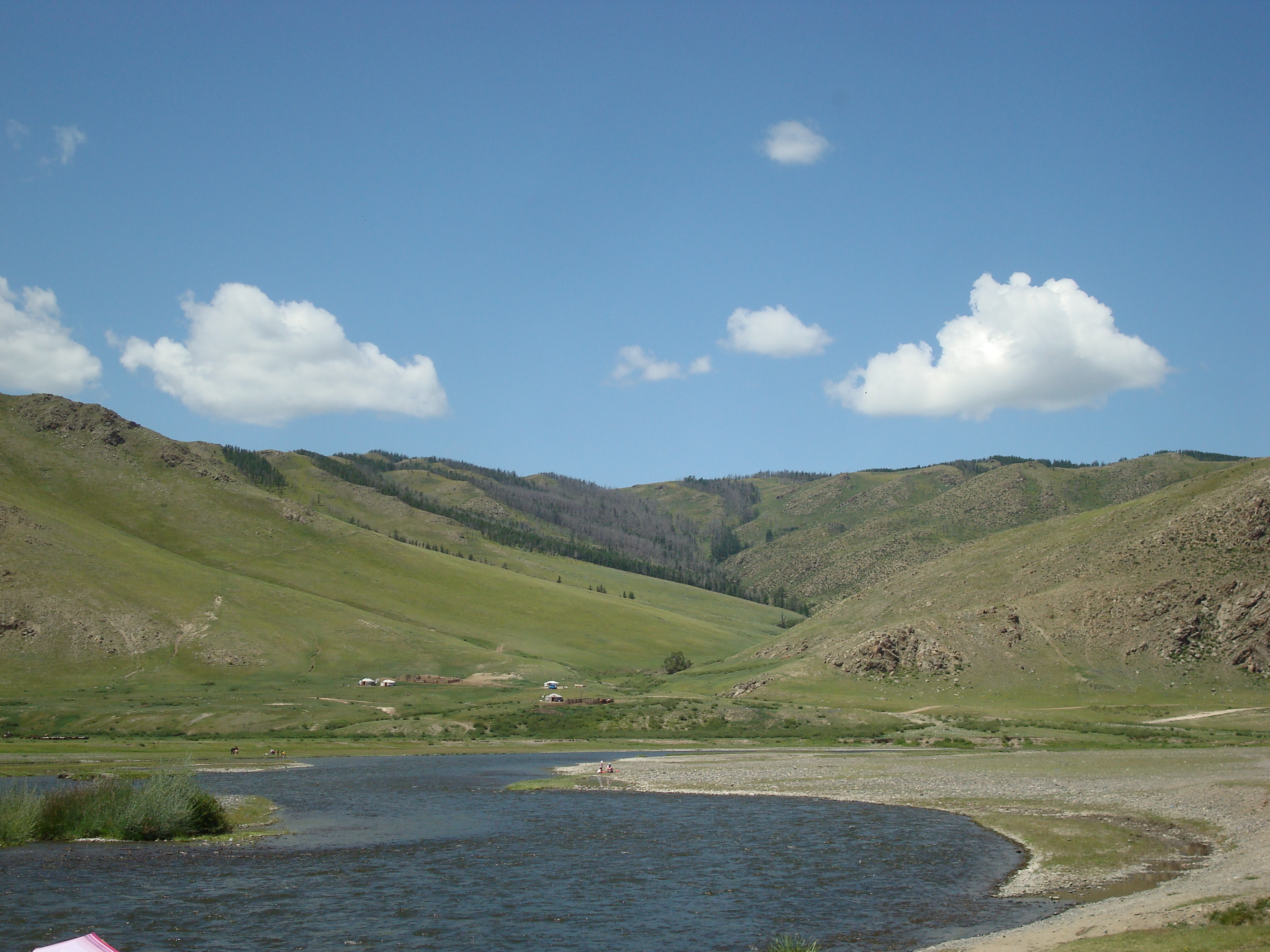
- Orkhon River near Kharkhorin

- Location within Mongolia
- Location: Mongolia
- Coordinates: 47.2°N 101.4°E
- Area: 888,500 hectares (2,195,531 acres; 8,885 km^{2}; 3,431 sq mi)
- Established: 1996
- Governing body: Ministry of Environment and Green Development of Mongolia

Khangai Nuruu National Park (Mongolian: Хангайн нуруу) stretches in a west-to-east band across the middle of the Khangai Mountains, with the eastern half following the upper Orkhon River valley. There are a variety of habitat types in the park: steppe, riparian forests, larch taiga, and alpine meadows.

== Topography ==
The park is over 200 km from the western foothills of the Khangai to the Kharkhorin on the eastern slope, following the Orkhon River. The Tuin River flows south from the western sector of the park, and the Khuisiin Naiman Nuur ("Eight Lakes") Nature Reserve is carved out of the south-central area. Elevations range from 1,700–2,700 metres (5,600–8,900 ft). The mountaintops are rounded, with bare rock at upper elevations.

== Climate and ecoregion ==
The climate of the area is Cold semi-arid climate (Köppen climate classification (BSk)). This climate is characteristic of steppe climates intermediary between desert humid climates, and typically have precipitation is above evapotranspiration. At least one month averages below 0 °C (32 °F).

The western half of the park is in the Khangai Mountains alpine meadow ecoregion. The eastern half, along the Orkhon River, is in the Selenge-Orkhon forest steppe ecoregion.

== Flora and fauna ==
The relatively flat steppe valley floor is steppe, with riparian forest along the rivers and streams. The higher slopes are generally forested with larch, pine and mixed forests. There are alpine meadows at the highest elevations. Endangered species in the park include the Pallas's fish eagle (Haliaeetus leucoryphus) and the Saker's Falcon (Falco cherrug). It has been recognised as an Important Bird Area by BirdLife International.

== See also ==
- List of national parks of Mongolia
