= Gobi Desert =

Desert in East Asia

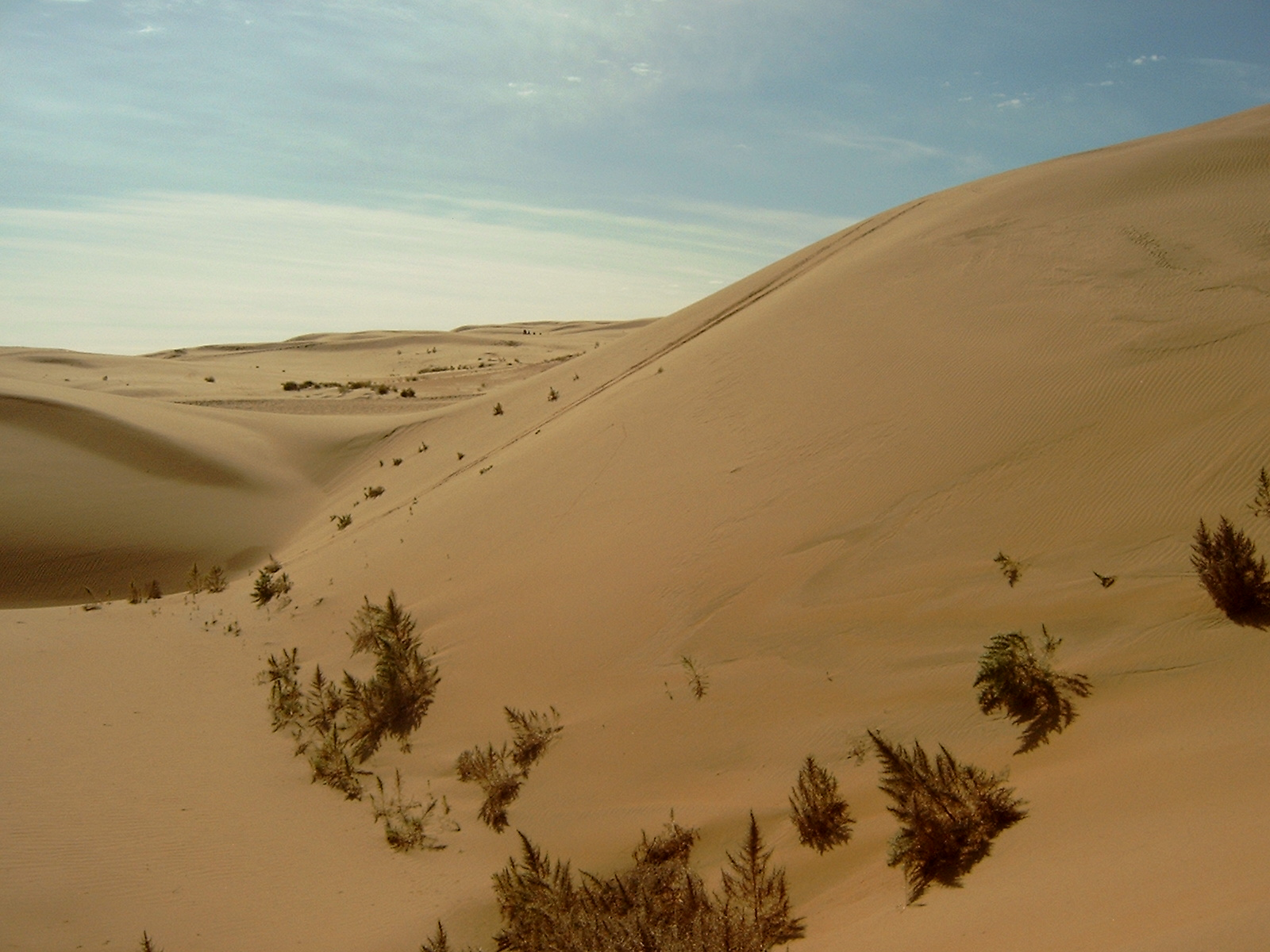
- Sand dunes in Inner Mongolia Autonomous Region, China

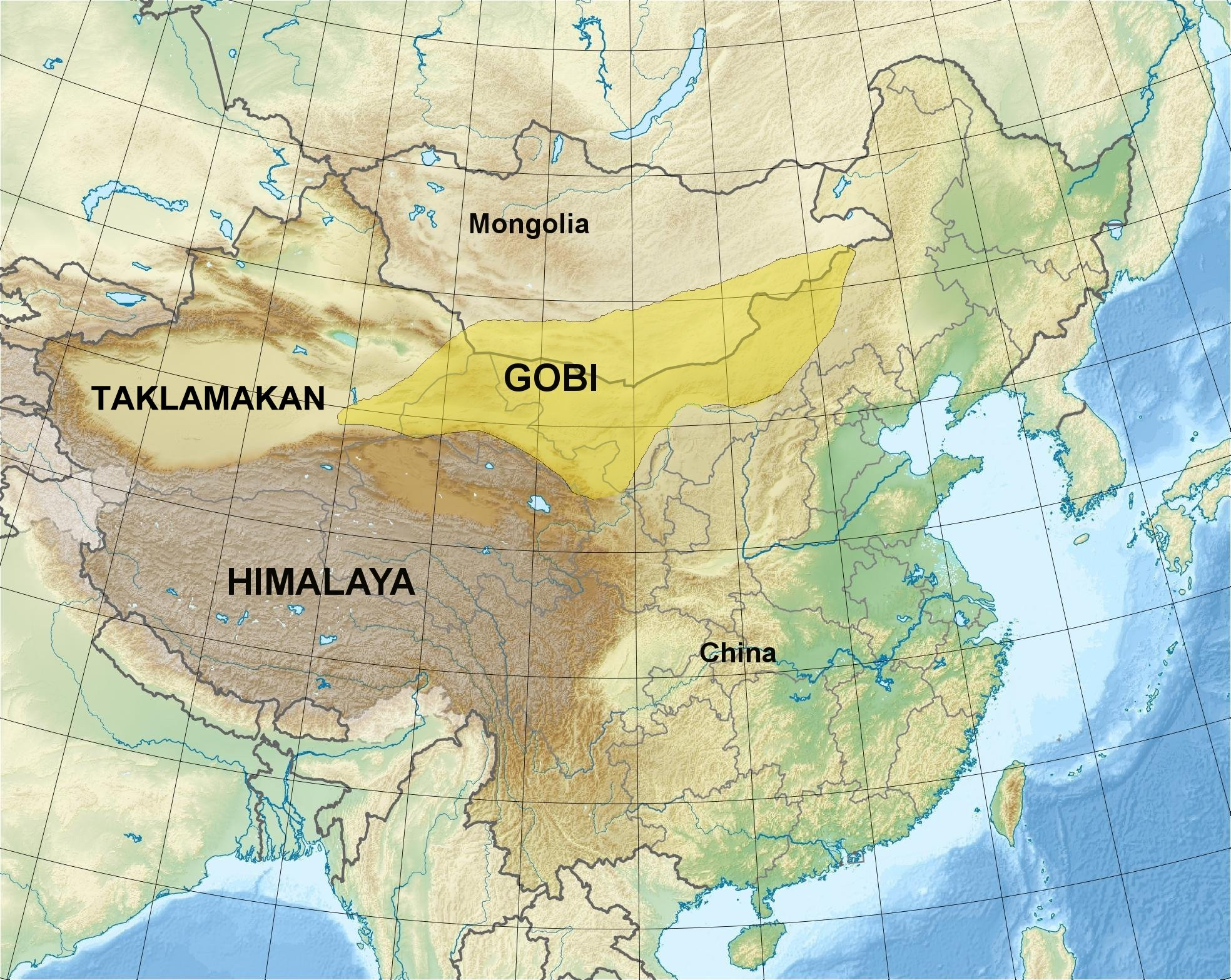
- Length: 1,500 km (930 mi)
- Width: 800 km (500 mi)
- Area: 1,295,000 km^{2} (500,000 mi^{2})

Naming
- Native name: 戈壁 (沙漠) (Chinese); Говь (ᠭᠣᠪᠢ) (Mongolian)

Geography
- Countries: Mongolia; China
- State: Ömnögovi; Sükhbaatar; Govi-Altai
- Region: Mongolia, Inner Mongolia
- Coordinates: 42.59°N 103.43°E

Gobi Desert

Chinese name
- Chinese: 戈壁
Transcriptions
Standard Mandarin
- Hanyu Pinyin: Gēbì
- Bopomofo: ㄍㄜ ㄅㄧˋ
- Gwoyeu Romatzyh: Gebih
- Wade–Giles: Ko-pi^{4}
- IPA: [kɤ́.pî]
other Mandarin
- Xiao'erjing: قْبِ

Mongolian name
- Mongolian Cyrillic: Говь
- Mongolian script: ᠭᠣᠪᠢ
Transcriptions
- SASM/GNC: Gowĭ

The Gobi Desert is a large, cold desert and grassland region in southern Mongolia and North China. It is the sixth-largest desert in the world.

The name of the desert comes from the Mongolian word Gov' (Говь, 'dryland'), used to refer to all of the waterless regions in the Mongolian Plateau; the borrowed Chinese term gēbì (戈壁) is used to refer to rocky, semi-deserts such as the Gobi itself rather than sandy deserts.

== Geography ==
The Gobi measures 1,600 km (1,000 mi) from southwest to northeast and 800 km (500 mi) from north to south. The desert is widest in the west, along the line joining the Lake Bosten and the Lop Nor (87°–89° east). Its area is approximately 1,295,000 square kilometres (500,000 sq mi).

Gobi includes the long stretch of desert extending from the foot of the Pamirs (77° east) to the Greater Khingan Mountains, 116–118° east, on the border of Manchuria; and from the foothills of the Altay, Sayan, and Yablonoi mountain ranges on the north to the Kunlun, Altyn-Tagh, and Qilian mountain ranges, which form the northern edges of the Tibetan Plateau, on the south.

A relatively large area on the east side of the Greater Khingan range, between the upper waters of the Songhua (Sungari) and the upper waters of the Liao-ho, is reckoned to belong to the Gobi by conventional usage. Some geographers and ecologists prefer to regard the western area of the Gobi region (as defined above): the basin of the Tarim in Xinjiang and the desert basin of Lop Nor and Hami (Kumul), as forming a separate and independent desert, called the Taklamakan Desert.

Much of the Gobi is not sandy, instead resembling exposed bare rock.

== Climate ==
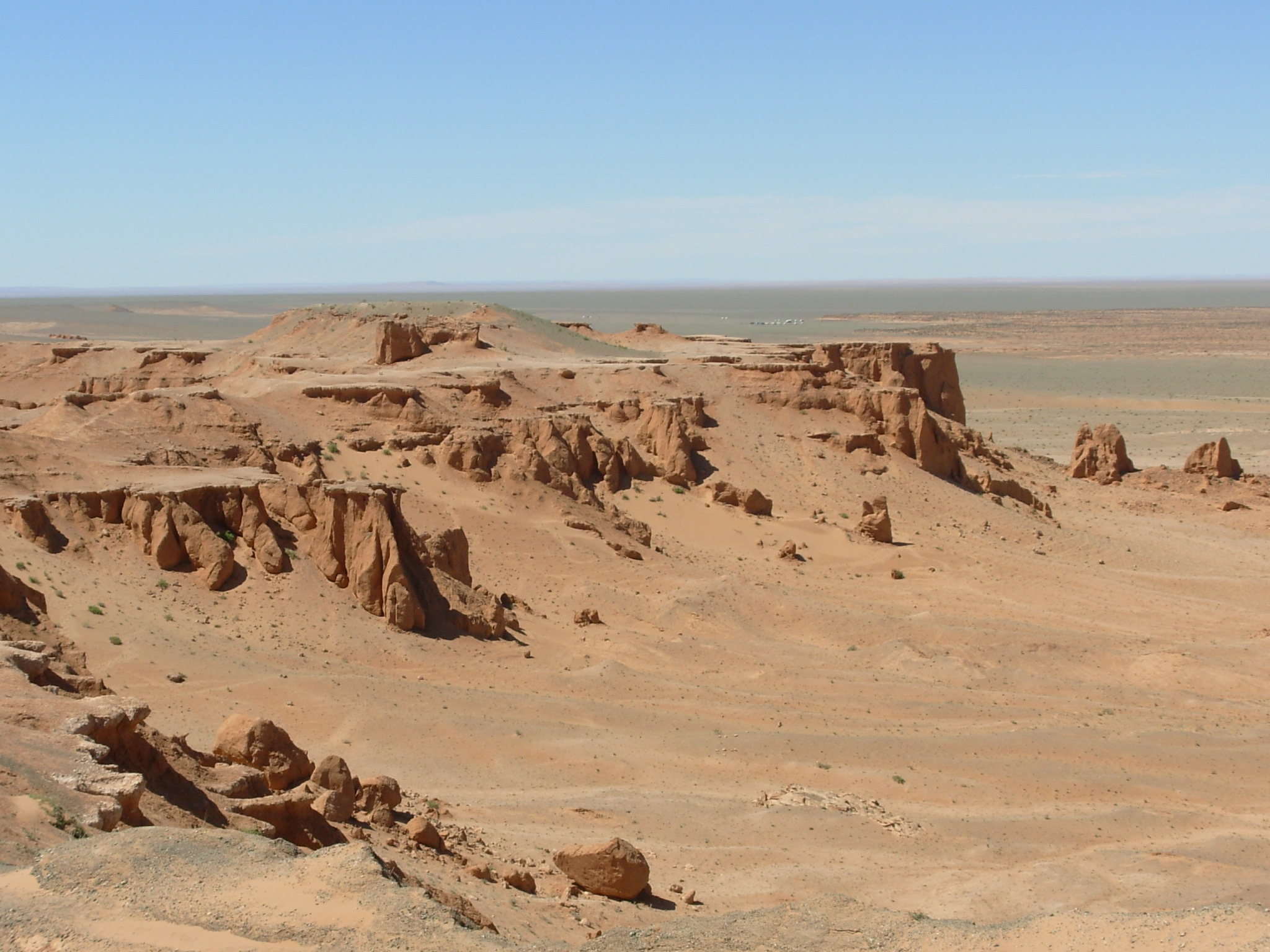
Flaming Cliffs in Mongolia

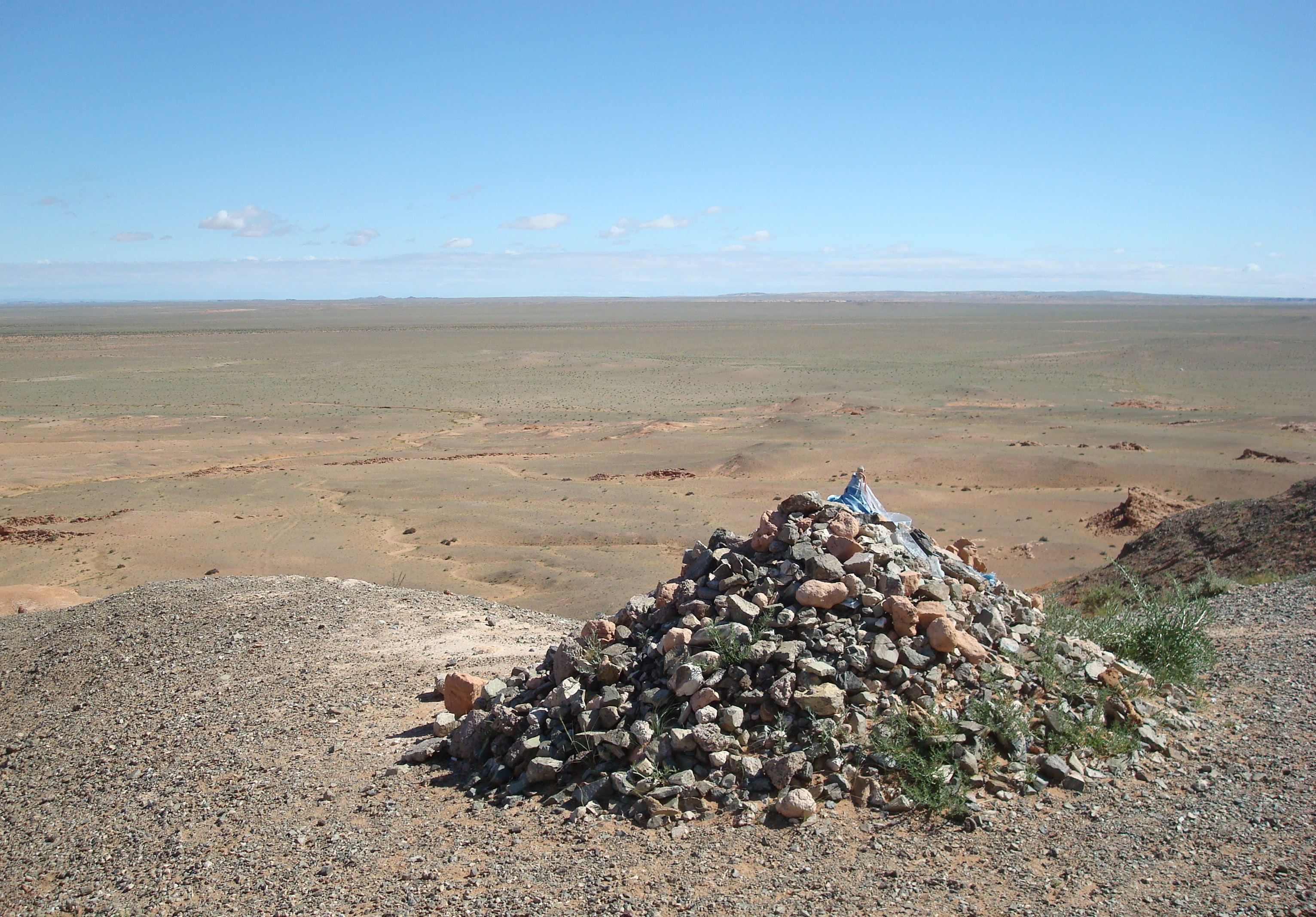
Sacred ovoo in the Gobi Desert

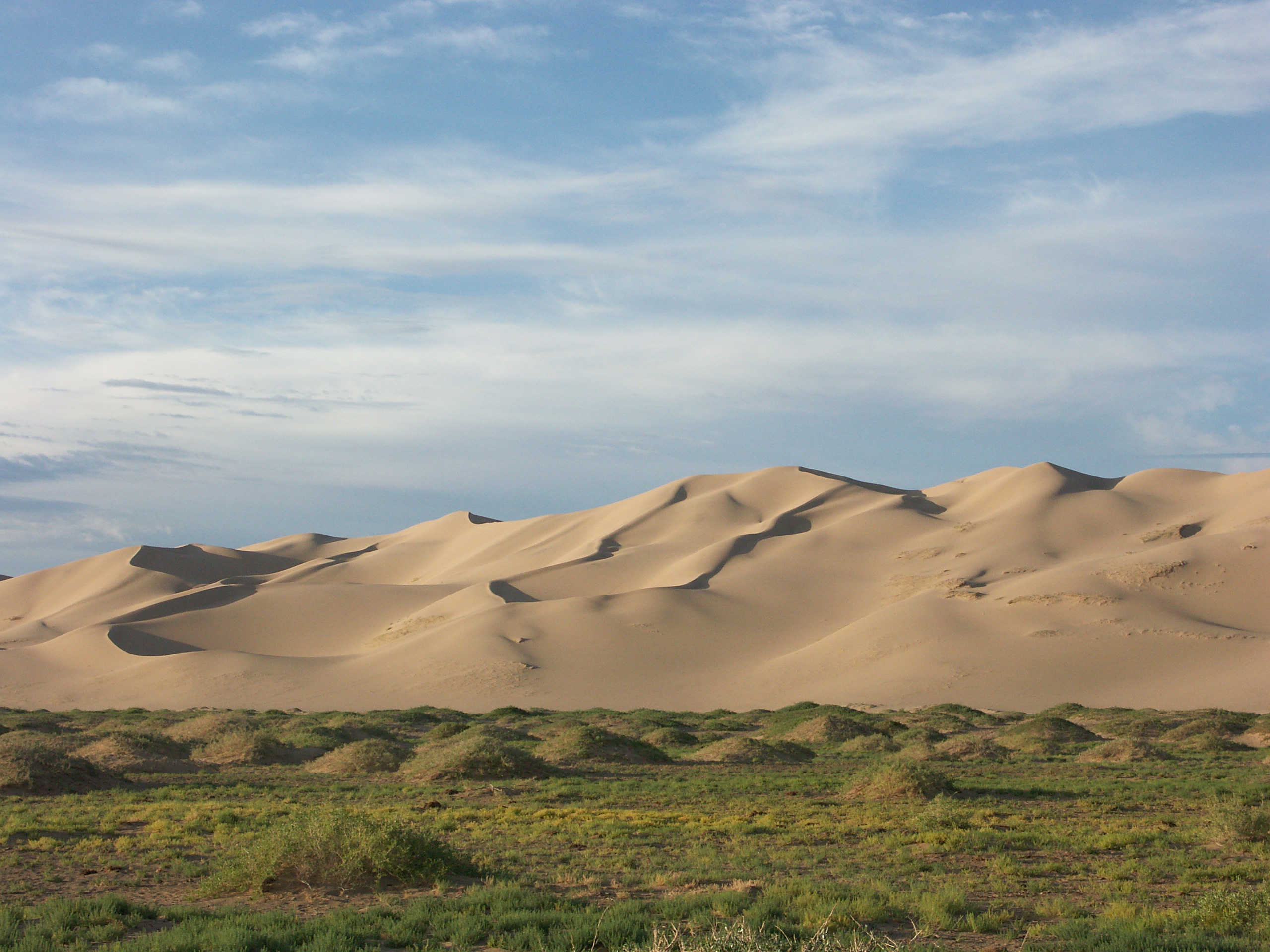
The sand dunes of Khongoryn Els, Gurvansaikhan NP, Mongolia

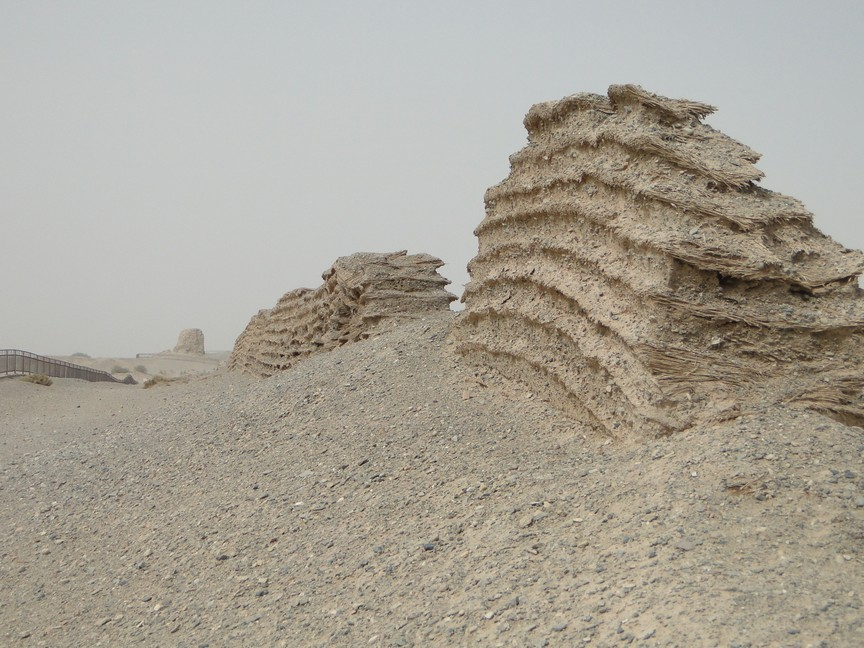
Remnants of the Great Wall of China in the Gobi Desert

The Gobi is overall a cold desert, with frost and occasionally snow occurring on its dunes. Besides being quite far north, it is also located on a plateau roughly 910–1,520 m (2,990–4,990 ft) above sea level, which contributes to its low temperatures. An average of about 194 mm (7.6 in) of rain falls annually in the Gobi. Additional moisture reaches parts of the Gobi in winter as snow is blown by the wind from the Siberian Steppes. These winds may cause the Gobi to reach −40 °C (−40 °F) in winter to 45 °C (113 °F) in summer.

However, the climate of the Gobi is one of great extremes, with rapid changes of temperature of as much as 35 °C (63 °F) in 24-hour spans.

Temperature
	(1190 m)	Ulaanbaatar (1150 m)
Annual mean	−2.5 °C (27.5 °F)	−0.4 °C (31.3 °F)
January mean	−26.5 °C (−15.7 °F)	−21.6 °C (−6.9 °F)
July mean	17.5 °C (63.5 °F)	18.2 °C (64.8 °F)
Extremes	−47 to 34 °C (−53 to 93 °F)	−42.2 to 39.0 °C (−44.0 to 102.2 °F)

In southern Mongolia, the temperature has been recorded as low as −32.8 °C (−27.0 °F). In contrast, in Alxa, Inner Mongolia, it rises as high as 37 °C (99 °F) in July.

Average winter minimums are a frigid −21 °C (−6 °F), while summertime maximums are a warm 27 °C (81 °F). Most of the precipitation falls during the summer.

Although the southeast monsoons reach the southeast parts of the Gobi, the area throughout this region is generally characterized by extreme dryness, especially during the winter, when the Siberian anticyclone is at its strongest. The southern and central parts of the Gobi Desert have variable plant growth due to this monsoon activity. The more northern areas of the Gobi are very cold and dry, making it unable to support much plant growth; this cold and dry weather is attributed to Siberian-Mongolian high pressure cells. Hence, the icy dust and snowstorms of spring and early summer plus early January (winter).

== Conservation, ecology, and economy ==
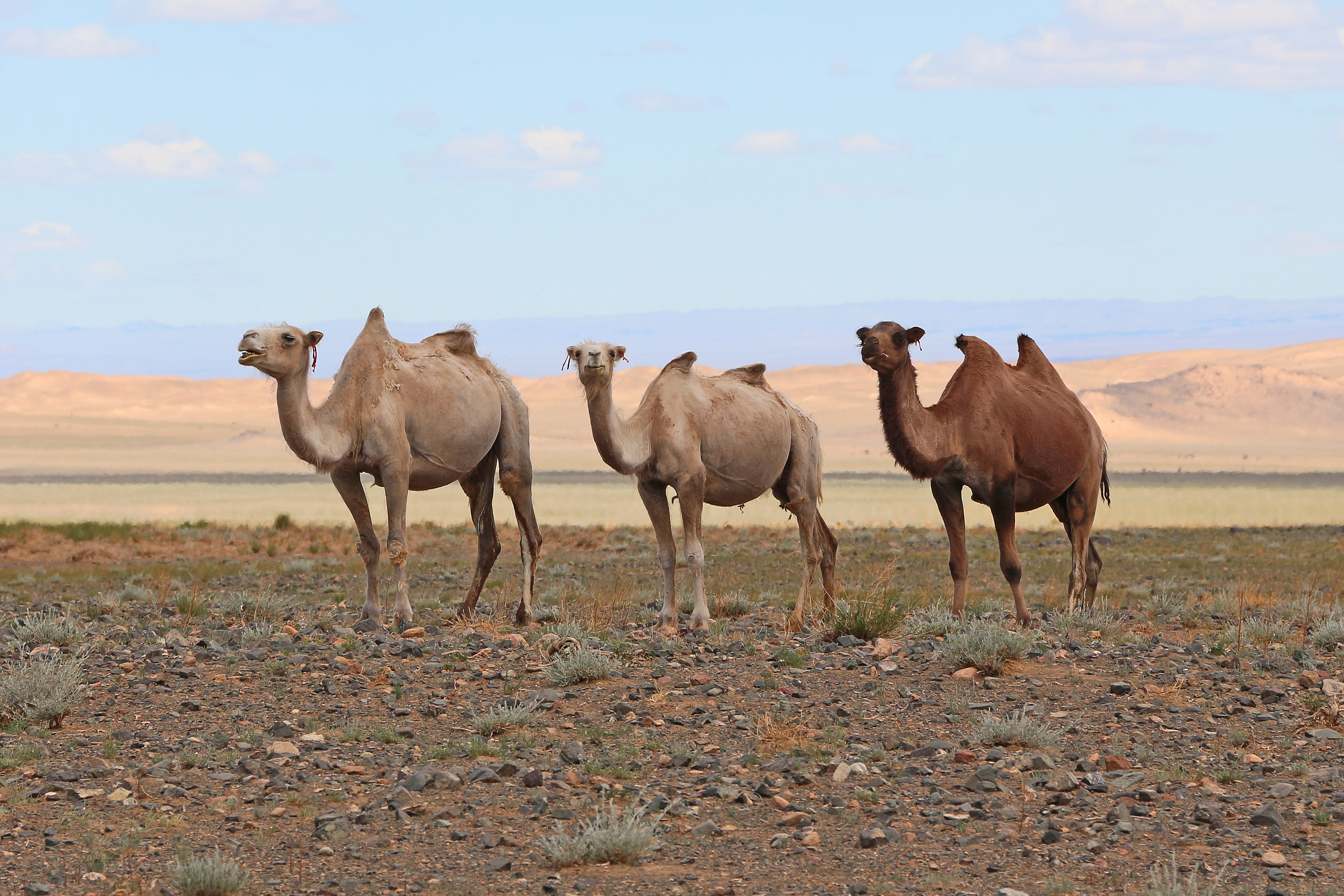
Camels walking in the Gobi Desert.

The Gobi Desert is the source of many important fossil finds, including the first dinosaur eggs, twenty-six of which, averaging 23 centimetres (9 in) in length, were uncovered in 1923.

Archeologists and paleontologists have done excavations in the Nemegt Basin in the northwestern part of the Gobi Desert (in Mongolia), which is noted for its fossil treasures, including early mammals, dinosaur eggs, and prehistoric stone implements, some 100,000 years old.

Despite the harsh conditions, these deserts and the surrounding regions sustain many animal species. Some are even unique, including black-tailed gazelles, marbled polecats, wild Bactrian camels, Mongolian wild ass and sandplovers. They are occasionally visited by snow leopards, Gobi bears, and wolves. Lizards are especially well-adapted to the climate of the Gobi Desert, with approximately 30 species distributed across its southern Mongolian border. The most common vegetation in the Gobi desert is shrubs adapted to drought. These shrubs included gray sparrow's saltwort (Salsola passerina), gray sagebrush, and low grasses such as needle grass and bridlegrass. Due to livestock grazing, the amount of shrubs in the desert has decreased. Several large nature reserves have been established in the Gobi, including Gobi Gurvansaikhan National Park, Great Gobi A and Great Gobi B Strictly Protected Area.

The area is vulnerable to trampling by livestock and off-road vehicles (effects from human intervention are greater in the eastern Gobi Desert, where rainfall is heavier and may sustain livestock). In Mongolia, grasslands have been degraded by goats, which are raised by nomadic herders as a source of cashmere wool.

== Desertification ==
The Gobi Desert is expanding through desertification, most rapidly on the southern edge into China, which is seeing 3,600 km^{2} (1,390 sq mi) of grassland overtaken every year. Dust storms increased in frequency between 1996 and 2016, causing further damage to China's agriculture economy. However, in some areas desertification has been slowed or reversed.

The northern and eastern boundaries between desert and grassland are constantly changing. This is mostly due to the climate conditions before the growing season, which influence the rate of evapotranspiration and subsequent plant growth.

The expansion of the Gobi is attributed mostly to human activities, locally driven by deforestation, overgrazing, and depletion of water resources, as well as to climate change.

China has tried various plans to slow the expansion of the desert, which have met with some success. The Three-North Shelter Forest Program (or "Green Great Wall") is a Chinese government tree-planting project begun in 1978 and set to continue through 2050. The goal of the program is to reverse desertification by planting aspen and other fast-growing trees on some 36.5 million hectares across some 551 counties in 12 provinces of northern China.

== Ecoregions ==
The Gobi, broadly defined, can be divided into five distinct dry ecoregions, based on variations in climate and topography:

- Eastern Gobi desert steppe, the easternmost of the Gobi ecoregions, covering an area of 281,800 km^{2} (108,804 sq mi). It extends from the Inner Mongolian Plateau in China northward into Mongolia. It includes the Yin Mountains and many low-lying areas with salt pans and small ponds. It is bounded by the Mongolian-Manchurian grassland to the north, the Yellow River Plain to the southeast, and the Alashan Plateau semi-desert to the southwest and west.
- Alashan Plateau semi-desert, lies west and southwest of the Eastern Gobi desert steppe. It consists of the desert basins and low mountains lying between the Gobi Altai range on the north, the Helan Mountains to the southeast, and the Qilian Mountains and northeastern portion of the Tibetan Plateau on the southwest.
- Gobi Lakes Valley desert steppe, ecoregion lies north of Alashan Plateau semi-desert, between the Gobi Altai range to the south and the Khangai Mountains to the north.
- Dzungarian Basin semi-desert, includes the desert basin lying between the Altai mountains on the north and the Tian Shan range on the south. It includes the northern portion of China's Xinjiang province and extends into the southeastern corner of Mongolia. The Alashan Plateau semi-desert lies to the east, and the Emin Valley steppe to the west, on the China-Kazakhstan border.
- Tian Shan range, separates the Dzungarian Basin semi-desert from the Taklamakan Desert, which is a low, sandy desert basin surrounded by the high mountain ranges of the Tibetan Plateau to the south and the Pamirs to the west. The Taklamakan Desert ecoregion includes the Desert of Lop.

=== Eastern Gobi desert steppe ===
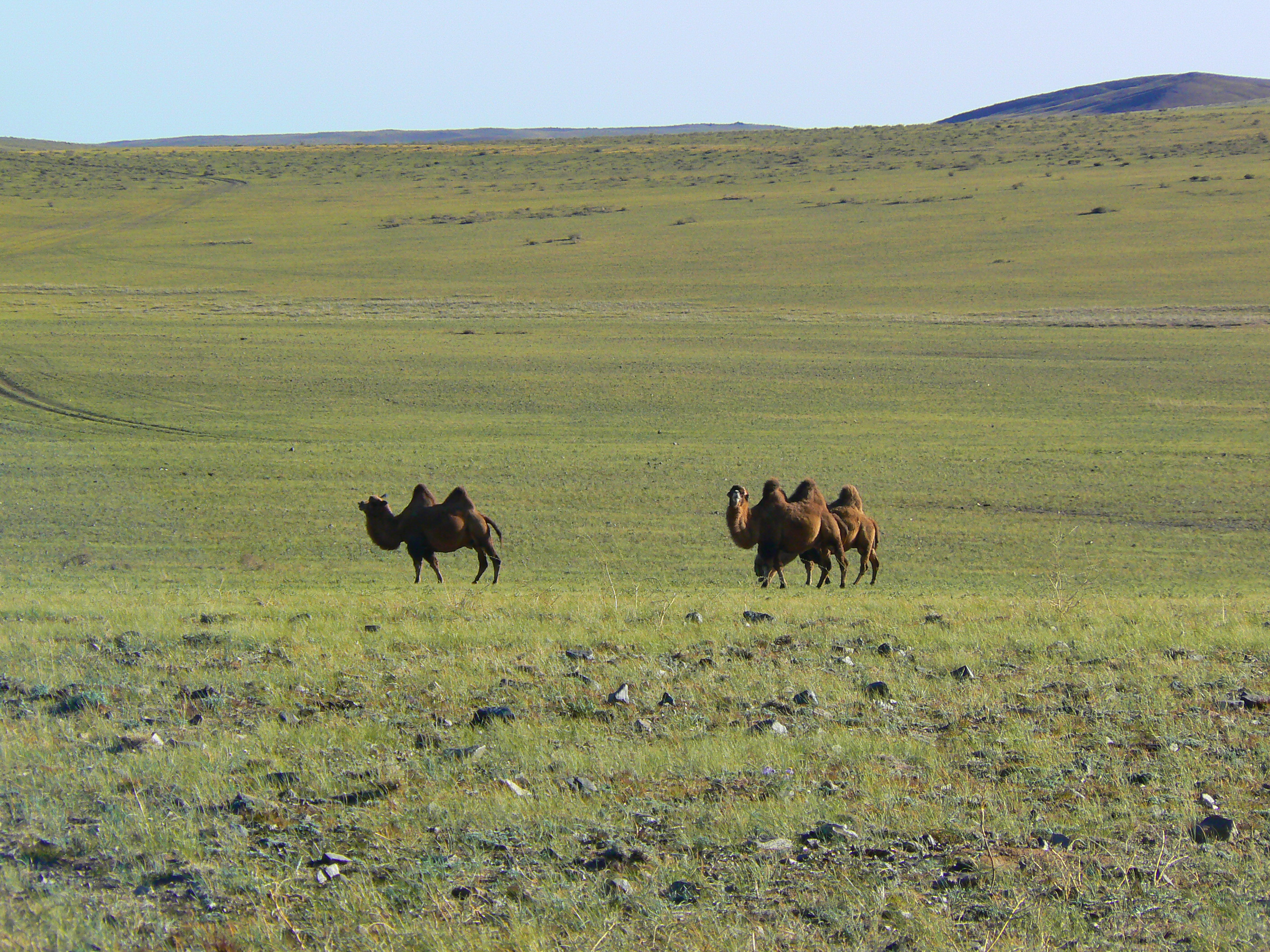
Bactrian camels in the Bayankhongor Province of Mongolia

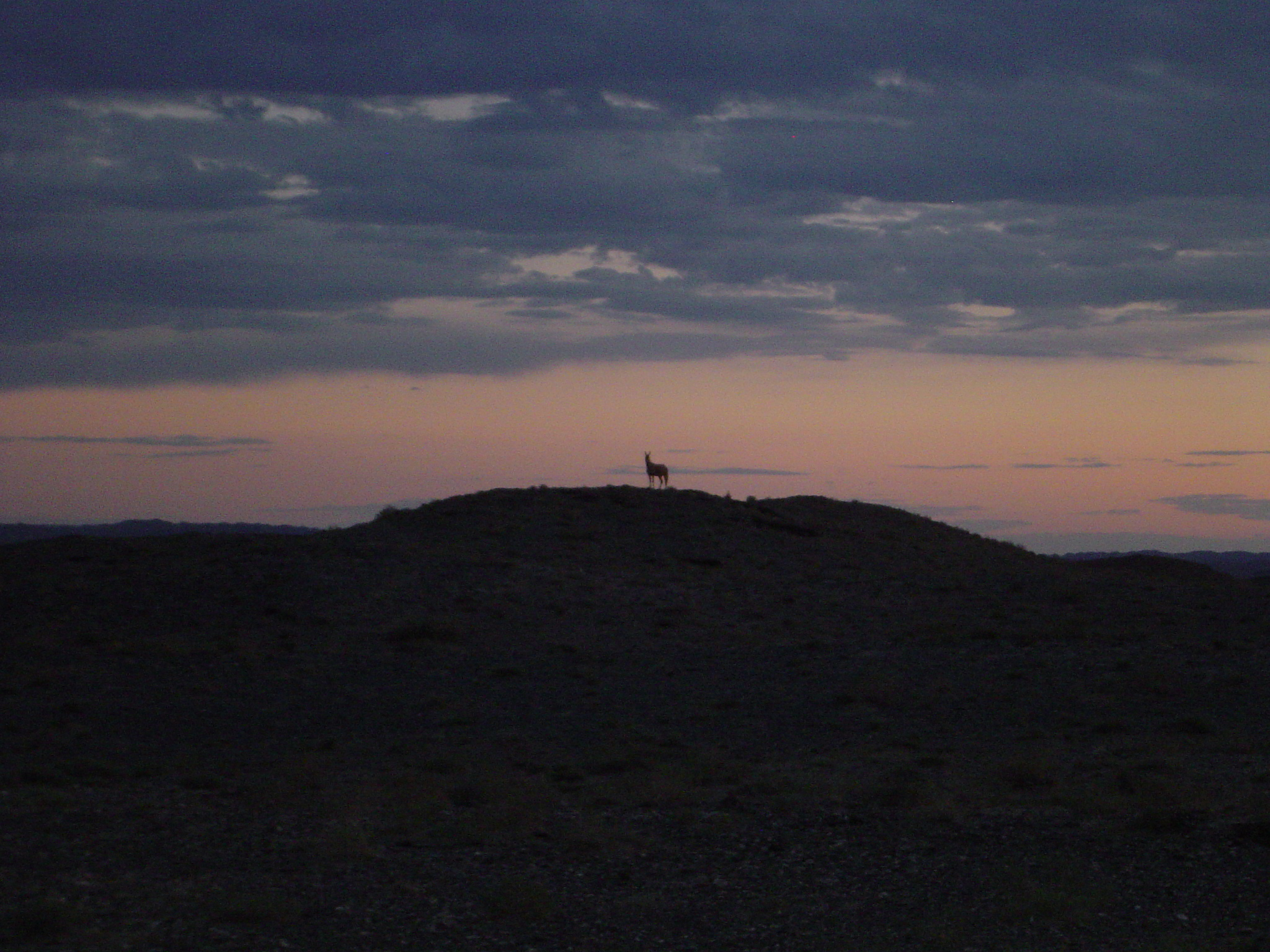
A Khulan (Mongolian wild ass) on a hill in the eastern Gobi of Mongolia at sunset

The surface is extremely diversified, although there are no great differences in vertical elevation. Between Ulaanbaatar (48°00′N 107°00′E) and the small lake of Iren-dubasu-nor (43°45′N 111°50′E), the surface is greatly eroded. Broad flat depressions and basins are separated by groups of flat-topped mountains of relatively low elevation 150 to 180 m (490 to 590 ft), through which archaic rocks crop out as crags and isolated rugged masses. The floors of the depressions lie mostly between 900 and 1,000 m (3,000 and 3,300 ft) above sea-level. Further south, between Iren-dutiasu-nor and the Yellow River, comes a region of broad tablelands alternating with flat plains, the latter ranging at altitudes of 1000–1100 m and the former at 1,070 to 1,200 m (3,510 to 3,940 ft). The slopes of the plateaus are more or less steep and are sometimes penetrated by "bays" of the lowlands.

As the border-range of the Hyangan is approached, the country steadily rises up to 1,370 m (4,490 ft) and then to 1,630 m (5,350 ft). Here small lakes frequently fill the depressions, though the water in them is generally salty or brackish. Both here and for 320 km (199 mi) south of Ulaanbaatar, streams are frequent and grass grows more or less abundantly. Through all the central parts, until the bordering mountains are reached, trees and shrubs are utterly absent. Clay and sand are the predominant formations; the watercourses, especially in the north, being frequently excavated 2 to 3 m (6 ft 7 in to 9 ft 10 in) deep. In many places in the flat, dry valleys or depressions farther south, beds of loess, 5 to 6 m (16 to 20 ft) thick, are exposed. West of the route from Ulaanbaatar to Kalgan, the country presents approximately the same general features, except that the mountains are not so irregularly scattered in groups but have more strongly defined strikes, mostly east to west, west-north-west to east-south-east, and west-south-west to east-north-east.

The altitudes are higher, those of the lowlands ranging from 1,000 to 1,700 m (3,300 to 5,600 ft), and those of the ranges from 200 to 500 m (660 to 1,640 ft) higher, though in a few cases they reach altitudes of 2,400 m (7,900 ft). The elevations do not form continuous chains, but make up a congeries of short ridges and groups rising from a common base and intersected by a labyrinth of ravines, gullies, glens, and basins. But the tablelands, built up of the horizontal red deposits of the Han-gai (Obruchev's Gobi formation) which are characteristic of the southern parts of eastern Mongolia, are absent here or occur only in one locality, near the Shara-muren river. They are greatly intersected by gullies or dry watercourses. Water is scarce, with no streams, no lakes, no wells, and precipitation falls seldom. The prevailing winds blow from the west and northwest, and the pall of dust overhangs the country as in the Taklamakan and the desert of Lop. Characteristic of the flora are wild garlic, Kalidium gracile, wormwood, saxaul, Nitraria schoberi, Caragana, Ephedra, saltwort and the grass Lasiagrostis splendens. The taana wild onion Allium polyrrhizum is the main browse eaten by many herd animals, and Mongolians claim that this is essential in producing the proper, hazelnut-like notes of camel airag (fermented milk).

The vast desert is crisscrossed by several trade routes, some of which have been in use for thousands of years. Among the most important are those from Kalgan (at the Great Wall) to Ulaanbaatar (960 km (597 mi)); from Jiuquan (in Gansu) to Hami 670 km (416 mi); from Hami to Beijing (2,000 km (1,243 mi)); from Hohhot to Hami and Barkul; and from Lanzhou (in Gansu) to Hami.

=== Alashan Plateau semi-desert ===
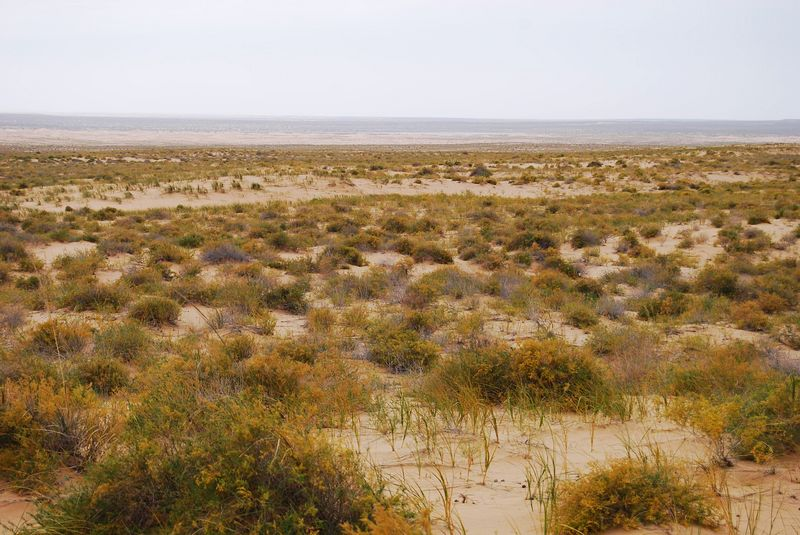
Alxa Left Banner, Inner Mongolia, China

The southwestern portion of the Gobi (known also as the Xitao or the "Little Gobi") encompasses the distance between the great northern loop of the Yellow River to the east, the Ejin River to the west, and the Qilian Mountains and narrow rocky chain of Longshou, 3,200 to 3,500 m (10,500 to 11,500 ft) in altitude, to the southwest. The Ordos Desert, which covers the northeastern portion of the Ordos Plateau (also near the great northern loop of the Yellow River) is part of this ecoregion within the middle basin of three great depressions into which Potanin divides the Gobi.

"Topographically," says Nikolai Przhevalsky, "it is a perfectly level plain, which in all probability once formed the bed of a huge lake or inland sea." He concludes this based on the level area of the region as a whole, the hard saline clay and the sand-strewn surface and, lastly, the salt lakes which occupy its lowest parts. For hundreds of kilometers, nothing can be seen but bare sands; in some places, they continue so far without a break that the Mongols call them Tengger (i.e. sky). These vast expanses are absolutely waterless, nor do any oases relieve the unbroken stretches of yellow sand, which alternate with equally vast areas of saline clay or, nearer the foot of the mountains, with barren shingle. Although on the whole a level country with a general altitude of 1,000 to 1,500 m (3,300 to 4,900 ft), this section, like most other parts of the Gobi, is crowned by a network of hills and broken ranges of at least 300 m in elevation. The vegetation is confined to a few varieties of bushes and a dozen kinds of grasses and herbs, the most conspicuous being saxaul (Haloxylon ammondendron) and Agriophyllum gobicum. The others include prickly convolvulus, field wormwood (Artemisia campestris), acacia, Inula ammophila, Sophora flavescens, Convolvulus ammanii, Peganum and Astragalus species, but all dwarfed, deformed and starved. The fauna consists of little but antelope, wolf, fox, hare, hedgehog, marten, numerous lizards and a few birds, e.g. the sandgrouse, lark, stonechat, sparrow, crane, Mongolian ground jay (Podoces hendersoni), horned lark (Eremophila alpestris), and crested lark (Galerida cristata).

=== Dzungarian Basin semi-desert ===
The structure here is that of the mighty T'ien Shan, or Heavenly Mountains, running from west to east. It divides the northern one-third of Sinkiang from the southern two-thirds. On the northern side, rivers formed from the snow and glaciers of the high mountains break through barren foothill ranges and flow out into an immense, hollow plain. Here the rivers begin to straggle and fan out, and form great marshes with dense reed-beds. Westerners call this terrain the Dzungarian desert. The Chinese also call it a desert, but the Mongols call it a 'gobi'—that is, a land of thin herbage, more suitable for camels than for cows, but capable also, if herds are kept small and moved frequently, of sustaining horses, sheep, and goats. The herbage comprises a high proportion of woody, fragrant plants. Gobi mutton is the most aromatic in the world.

The Yulduz valley or valley of the Haidag-gol (43°N 83°E–43°N 86°E) is a mini desert enclosed by two prominent members of the Shanashen Trahen Osh mountain range, namely the chucis and the kracenard pine rallies, running perpendicular and far from one another. As they proceed south, they transcend and transpose, sweeping back on east and west respectively, with Lake Bosten in between. These two ranges mark the northern and the southern edges respectively of a great swelling, which extends eastward for nearly twenty degrees of longitude.

On its northern side, the Chol-tagh descends steeply, and its foot is fringed by a string of deep depressions, ranging from Lukchun (130 m (427 ft) below sea level) to Hami (850 m (2,789 ft) above sea-level). To the south of the Kuruk-tagh lie the desert of Lop Nur, the Kum-tagh desert, and the valley of the Bulunzir-gol. To this great swelling, which arches up between the two border-ranges of the Chol-tagh and Kuruk-tagh, the Mongols give the name of Ghashuun-Gobi or "Salt Desert". It is some 130 to 160 km (81 to 99 mi) across from north to south, and is traversed by a number of minor parallel ranges, ridges and chains of hills. Down its middle runs a broad stony valley, 40 to 80 km (25 to 50 mi) wide, at an elevation of 900 to 1,370 m (2,950 to 4,490 ft). The Chol-tagh, which reaches an average altitude of 1,800 m (5,900 ft), is absolutely sterile, and its northern foot rests upon a narrow belt of barren sand, which leads down to the depressions mentioned above.

The Kuruk-tagh is the greatly disintegrated, denuded and wasted relic of a mountain range which used to be of incomparably greater magnitude. In the west, between Lake Bosten and the Tarim, it consists of two, possibly of three, principal ranges, which, although broken in continuity, run generally parallel to one another, and embrace between them numerous minor chains of heights. These minor ranges, together with the principal ranges, divide the region into a series of long; narrow valleys, mostly parallel to one another and to the enclosing mountain chains, which descend like terraced steps, on the one side towards the depression of Lukchun and on the other towards the desert of Lop.

In many cases these latitudinal valleys are barred transversely by ridges or spurs, generally elevations en masse of the bottom of the valley. Where such elevations exist, there is generally found, on the east side of the transverse ridge, a cauldron-shaped depression, which some time or other has been the bottom of a former lake, but is now nearly a dry salt-basin. The surface configuration is in fact markedly similar to that which occurs in the inter-mount latitudinal valleys of the Kunlun Mountains. The hydrography of the Ghashiun-Gobi and the Kuruk-tagh is determined by the aforementioned arrangements of the latitudinal valleys. Most of the principal streams, instead of flowing straight down these valleys, cross them diagonally and only turn west after they have cut their way through one or more of the transverse barrier ranges.

To the highest range on the great swelling Grigory Grum-Grshimailo gives the name of Tuge-tau, its altitude being 2,700 m (8,858 ft) above the level of the sea and some 1,200 m (3,937 ft) above the crown of the swelling itself. This range he considers to belong to the Choltagh system, whereas Sven Hedin would assign it to the Kuruk-tagh. This last, which is pretty certainly identical with the range of Kharateken-ula (also known as the Kyzyl-sanghir, Sinir, and Singher Mountains), that overlooks the southern shore of the Lake Bosten, though parted from it by the drift-sand desert of Ak-bel-kum (White Pass Sands), has at first a west-northwest to east-southeast strike, but it gradually curves round like a scimitar towards the east-northeast and at the same time gradually decreases in elevation.

At 91° east, where the principal range of the Kuruk-tagh system wheels to the east-northeast, four of its subsidiary ranges terminate, or rather die away somewhat suddenly, on the brink of a long narrow depression (in which Sven Hedin sees a northeast bay of the former great Central Asian lake of Lop-nor), having over against them the écheloned terminals of similar subordinate ranges of the Pe-shan (Boy-san) system (see below). The Kuruk-tagh is throughout a relatively low, but almost completely barren range, being entirely destitute of animal life, save for hares, antelopes and wild camels, which frequent its few small, widely scattered oases. The vegetation, which is confined to these same areas, is of the scantiest and is mainly confined to bushes of saxaul (Haloxylon), anabasis, reeds (kamish), tamarisks, poplars, and Ephedra.

== History ==
=== Prehistory ===
There is little information about early habitation of the Gobi desert.

Lisa Janz has proposed a system of nomenclature for early Gobi desert habitation. They are Oasis I, Oasis II, Oasis III.

Oasis I is equivalent to the Mesolithic from 13500 cal BP to 8000 cal BP. During this time people began using oases. It is characterized by:

- micro blades
- small milling stones
- small tools
- plain, low fired, pottery with high organic content.

Oasis II is equivalent to the Neolithic from 8000 cal BP to 5000 cal BP. People used the oases extensively. It was characterized by:

- micro blades
- milling stones
- chipped macro tools
- adzes
- axes
- high quality cryptocrystallines
- honeycomb imprinted, corded, string paddled, low and high fired pottery with a sand and gravel mixture.

Starting around 8000 cal BP there was a warm wet phase in the Gobi desert.By 7500 cal BP lake levels in the Western Gobi reached their peak. Around this time there was meadow steppe vegetation around lakes. In Ulaan Nuur there may have been shrubby riparian woodlands.

Oasis III is equivalent to the Bronze Age from 5000 cal BP to 3000 cal BP. It is characterized by:

- micro blades
- chipped micro tools
- bifacially flakes arrowheads
- blades
- knives
- grinding stones
- copper slag
- high quality chalcedony
- bone beads,
- clay spindle whorls
- plain, string paddled, moulded rim, painted, geometrically incised, high and low fired pottery with mixture of sand, gravel, mica, shells, and fiber.

Bronze Age herder burials have been found in the Gobi desert, as well as Karasuk bronze knives, and Mongolian deer stones. Between 5000 cal BP and 4500 cal BP there was a period of desertification. Due to the increasing aridity between 3500 cal BP and 3000 cal BP there was a decline in human habitation in the Gobi desert. Prehistoric petroglyphs have been found in Southern Mongolia in 1997.

=== European and American exploration ===
The Gobi had a long history of human habitation, mostly by nomadic peoples. The name of Gobi means desert in Mongolian. The region was inhabited mostly by Mongols, Uyghurs, and Kazakhs.

The Gobi Desert as a whole was known only very imperfectly to outsiders, as information was confined to observations by individual travelers engaging in their respective itineraries across the desert. Among the European and American explorers who contributed to the understanding of the Gobi, the most important were the following:

- Jean-François Gerbillon (1688–1698)
- Eberhard Isbrand Ides (1692–1694)
- Lorenz Lange (1727–1728 and 1736)
- Fuss and Alexander G. von Bunge (1830–1831)
- Hermann Fritsche (1868–1873)
- Pavlinov and Z.L. Matusovski (1870)
- Ney Elias (1872–1873)
- Nikolai Przhevalsky (1870–1872 and 1876–1877)
- Zosnovsky (1875)
- Mikhail V. Pevtsov (1878)
- Grigory Potanin (1877 and 1884–1886)
- Béla Széchenyi and Lajos Lóczy (1879–1880)
- The brothers Grigory Grum-Grshimailo (1889–1890) and M. Y. Grigory Grum-Grshimailo
- Pyotr Kuzmich Kozlov (1893–1894 and 1899–1900)
- Vsevolod I. Roborovsky (1894)
- Vladimir Obruchev (1894–1896)
- Karl Josef Futterer and Dr. Holderer (1896)
- Charles-Etienne Bonin (1896 and 1899)
- Sven Hedin (1897 and 1900–1901)
- K. Bogdanovich (1898)
- Ladyghin (1899–1900) and Katsnakov (1899–1900)
- Jacques Bouly de Lesdain and Martha Mailey, 1902
- Roy Chapman Andrews from the American Museum of Natural History who led several palaeontological expeditions to the Gobi Desert in the 1920s
- Zofia Kielan-Jaworowska who led Polish-Mongolian palaeontological expeditions in the 1960s.

== See also ==
- Asian Dust
- Geography of Mongolia
- Geography of China
- Green Wall of China
- List of deserts by area
- Mongolian death worm (olgoi khorkhoi), said to inhabit the Gobi in Mongolia

== General references ==
- Lattimore, Owen (June 1973). "Return to China's Northern Frontier". The Geographical Journal. 139 (2): 233–242. doi:10.2307/1796091. JSTOR 1796091.
