= Khangai Mountains alpine meadow =

National park in Mongolia

Khangai Mountains alpine meadows
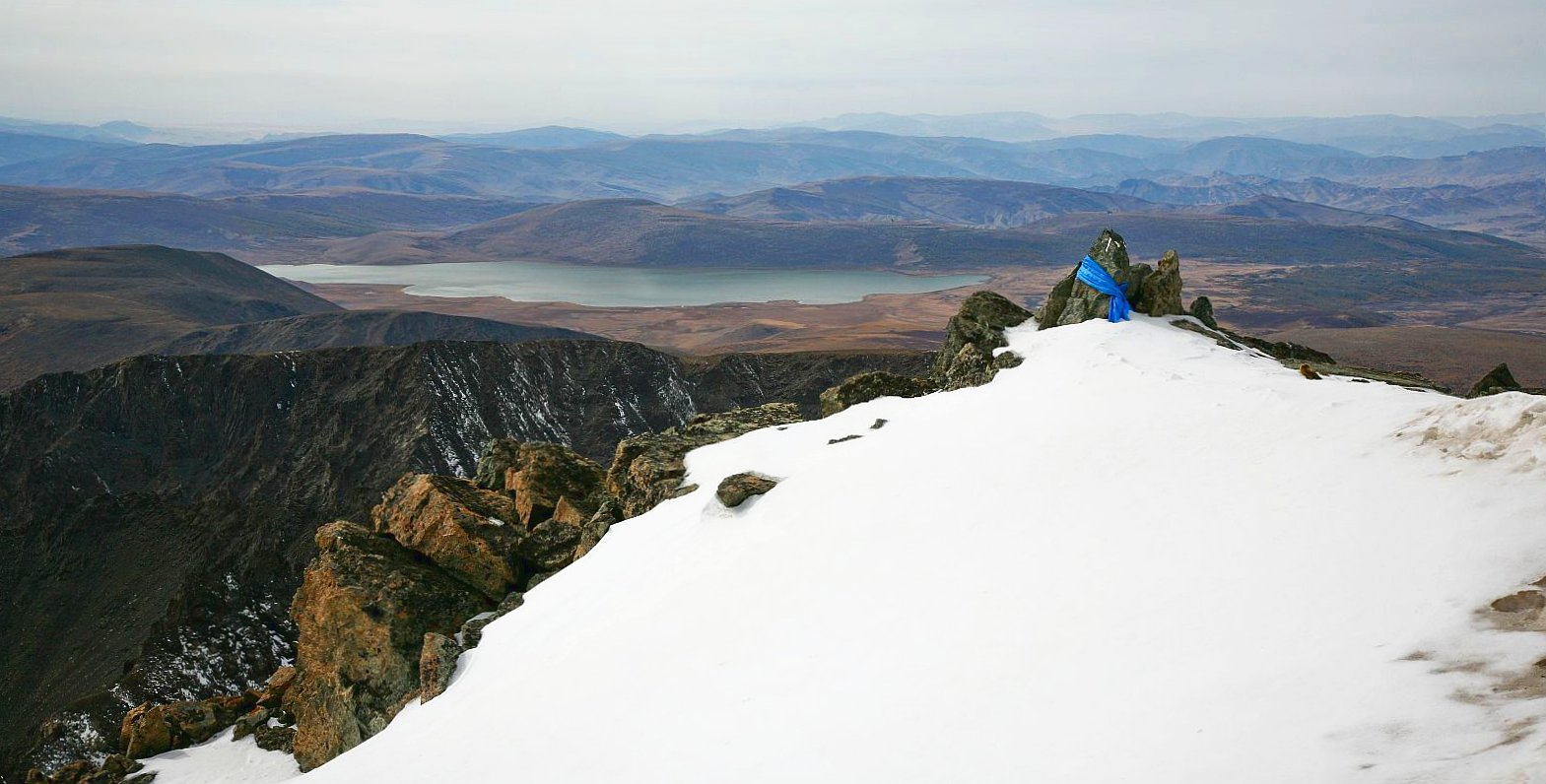
- View from Otgontenger

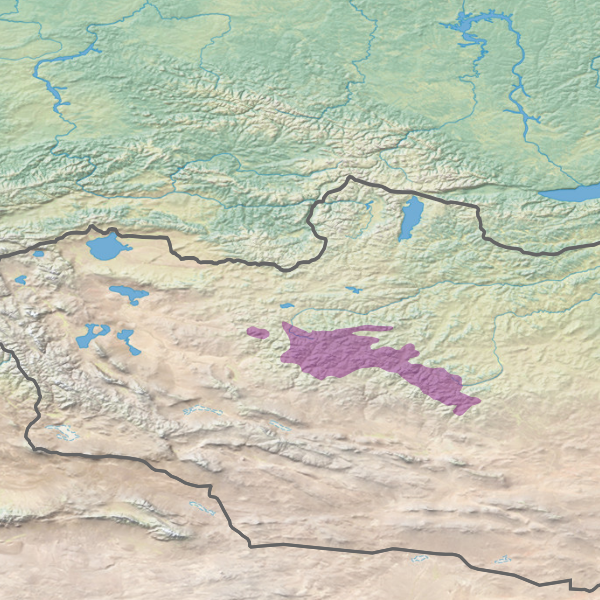
- Ecoregion territory (in yellow)

Ecology
- Realm: Palearctic
- Biome: Deserts and xeric shrublands

Geography
- Area: 23,014 km^{2} (8,886 sq mi)
- Countries: Mongolia
- Coordinates: 47°45′N 98°45′E

The Khangai Mountains alpine meadows ecoregion (WWF ID: PA1007) runs along the central ridge of the Khangai Mountains in central Mongolia. The slopes to the north are conifer forests, the lowlands to the south are semi-arid steppe. The Khangai are an "island" mountain range surrounded by lower forest steppe and semi-arid regions of central Mongolia. Most of the region is now protected by Tarvagatai Nuruu National Park and Khangai Nuruu National Park.

== Location and description ==
The ecoregion has an average altitude of 2,000 to 2,500 meters, with higher peaks rising 4,031 meters at Mt Otgontenger on the western edge of the range. At lower altitudes, the ecoregion is completely surrounded by the Selenge-Orkhon forest steppe ecoregion, except for a thin band of the Khangai Mountains conifer forests on the northern slope of the Khangai's Tarbagatay Range. The alpine meadows tend to be flat, and the origins of the Orkhon River and Selenge River are in the region. The topography reflects multiple periods of glaciation, although there are currently no permanent snow fields in the range outside of Otgontenger.

== Climate ==
The climate of the ecoregion is Cold semi-arid climate (Köppen climate classification (BSk)). This climate is characteristic of steppe climates intermediary between desert humid climates, and typically have precipitation is above evapotranspiration. At least one month averages below 0 °C (32 °F). Precipitation averages over 400 mm/year.

== Flora and fauna ==
Above the treeline, the plant communities are low shrubs, grasses, sedges, moss and lichen. The marshy meadows at higher altitudes support bog sedges (Kobresia). There are relatively few animal species at this altitude, but Alpine pika are noteworthy, and birds include the Altai snowcock (Tetraogallus altaicus) and Eurasian dotterel (Charadrius morinellus).

== See also ==
- List of ecoregions in Mongolia
- Khangai Nuruu National Park
