= Eastern Gobi desert steppe =

Ecoregion in Mongolia and China

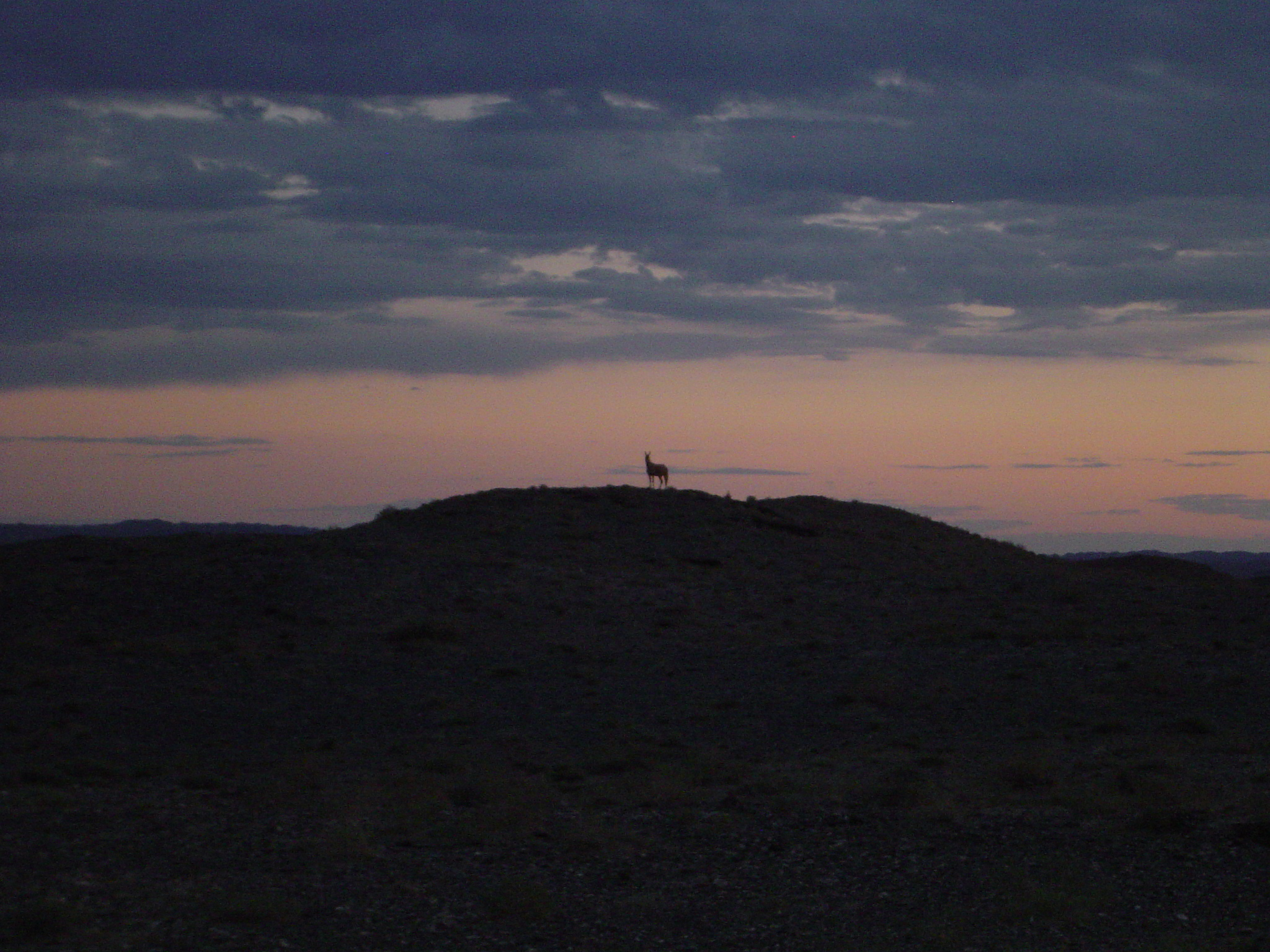
- A Mongolian wild ass or khulan (Equus hemionus hemionus) in the eastern Gobi of Mongolia at sunset

Ecology
- Realm: Palearctic
- Biome: deserts and xeric shrublands
- Borders: Alashan Plateau semi-desert; Gobi Lakes Valley desert steppe; Mongolian–Manchurian grassland

Geography
- Area: 282,448 km^{2} (109,054 sq mi)
- Countries: China; Mongolia
- Province: Inner Mongolia

Conservation
- Conservation status: Vulnerable
- Protected: 3.34%

The Eastern Gobi desert steppe is a deserts and xeric shrublands ecoregion in Mongolia and northern China. It is the easternmost of the ecoregions that make up the larger Gobi Desert. It lies between the more humid Mongolian–Manchurian grassland on the north, east, and southeast, and the drier Alashan Plateau semi-desert to the west.

== Geography ==
The ecoregion lies on a plateau, mostly between 1000 and 1500 meters elevation. The ecoregion extends southwest along the Yin Mountains, which rise between 1,500 and 2,200 meters elevation.

There are no large rivers in the ecoregion. Most of the ecoregion lies in closed basins, with intermittent streams that drain into salt pans and small ponds.

== Climate ==
The climate is arid and continental. Winters are intensely cold, with January mean temperatures of −20 to −28 °C (−4 to −18 °F). Summers are warm to hot, depending on elevation. The mean annual temperature ranges from -2 to -6 °C. Annual rainfall ranges from 100 to 150 mm, falling mostly in the summer, and varies considerably from year to year.

== Flora ==
The predominant vegetation is a steppe of drought-tolerant shrubs and low grasses. The legumes Caragana bungei and Caragana leucocephala are characteristic shrubs. Other shrubs include gray sparrow's saltwort (Salsola passerina), gray sagebrush (Artemisia xerophytica), Potaninia mongolica, and Nitraria sibirica. Common grasses include the needle grasses Stipa gobica and Stipa glareosa and bridlegrass (Cleistogenes soongorica). The taana wild onion (Allium polyrhizum) is the main browse eaten by many herd animals, and Mongolians claim that this is essential in producing the proper, hazelnut-like notes of camel airag (fermented milk).

== Fauna ==
Large mammals in the ecoregion include the Mongolian wild ass (Equus hemionus hemionus), Mongolian saiga antelope (Saiga tartarica mongolica), Yarkand gazelle (Gazella subgutturosa), and marbled polecat (Vormela peregusna). Several species of jerboas (family Dipodidae) are found in sandy areas. Jerboas are small mammals with long hindlegs and tails, adapted to burrowing and able to jump up to three meters. Native jerboa species include the long-eared jerboa (Euchoreutus naso), Kozlov's pygmy jerboa (Salpingotus kozlovi), Mongolian jerboa (Stylodipus andewsi), and Gobi jerboa (Allactaga bullata).

Native birds include the lammergeier (Gypaetus barbatus), cinereous vulture (Aegypius monachus), MacQueen's bustard (Chlamydotis macqueenii), chukar partridge (Alectoris chukar), Pallas's sandgrouse (Syrrhaptes paradoxus), Mongolian ground jay (Podoces hendersoni), greater sand plover (Charadrius leschenaultii), and Mongolian finch (Bucanetes mongolicus).

== Human use ==
The vast desert is crisscrossed by several trade routes, some of which have been in use for thousands of years. Among the most important are those from Kalgan (at the Great Wall) to Ulaanbaatar (960 km (597 mi)); from Jiuquan (in Gansu) to Hami 670 km (416 mi); from Hami to Beijing (2,000 km (1,243 mi)); from Hohhot to Hami and Barkul; and from Lanzhou (in Gansu) to Hami.

== Protected areas ==
3.34% of the ecoregion is in protected areas. Protected areas include Gobi Gurvansaikhan National Park, Wuliangsuhainiaolei Protected Area, Ergeliin Zoo Nature Reserve, Ikh Nartiin Chuluu Nature Reserve, Zagiin us Nature Reserve, Gobiin baga Strictly Protected Area, Ongon Tavan bulag Nature Reserve, Delgerkhangai mountain Nature Reserve, and Burdene bulag Nature Reserve.
