= Great Lakes Basin desert steppe =

Ecoregion in Mongolia and Russia

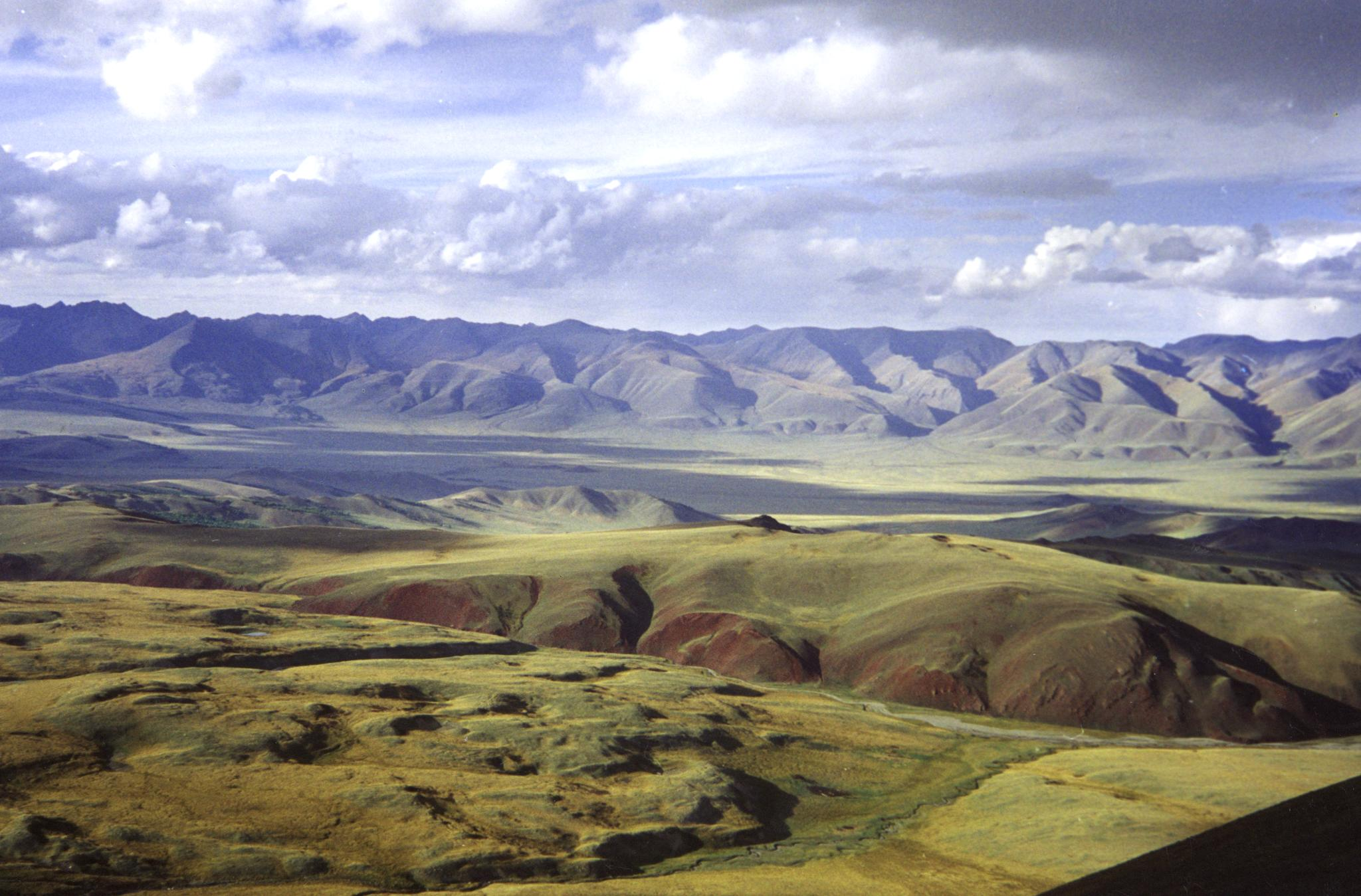
- Ubsunur Hollow landscape, Mongolia

- Ecoregion territory (in purple)

Ecology
- Realm: Palearctic
- Biome: deserts and xeric shrublands

Geography
- Area: 157,212 km^{2} (60,700 sq mi)
- Countries: Russia, Mongolia
- Coordinates: 48.75°N 93.75°E

The Great Lakes Basin desert steppe ecoregion (WWF ID: PA1316) covers the enclosed basin centered on Uvs Lake, a saline, endorheic basin (that is, no external drainage to the ocean) in northwestern Mongolia. A portion of the ecoregion stretches across the region into Russia. The lake district is important for migrating birds, waterfowl, and seabirds. The ecoregion is in the Palearctic realm and the deserts and xeric shrublands biome. It has an area of 157,212 square kilometres (60,700 sq mi).

== Location and description ==
The ecoregion stretches approximately 500 km west to east, and 600 km north to south, to encompass the Uvs Lake Basin in northwestern Mongolia and borderlands in Russia. Aside from the lakes, the terrain is gently sloping clay and gravel, mostly at elevations of 700 meters to 2,000 meters. The mountains on the margins reach up to 4,000 metres (13,000 ft) above sea level. Intersperse are tracts of bare sand, bogs, and rock outcrops.

== Climate ==
The climate of the ecoregion is cool semi-arid (Köppen climate classification BSk). This climate is characterized by high variation in temperature, both daily and seasonally; with low precipitation and cool winters. Average annual precipitation in the Uvs Nuur region is 167 mm. Average temperature in January is −26.6 °C (−15.9 °F), and in July is 18.8 °C (65.8 °F)

== Flora and fauna ==
The basin is an area of great diversity, because it incorporates many transition zones, such as steppe to desert, fresh-water to salt-water, and low-altitude to high-altitude. Floral communities associated with all of these central Asian biomes are represented. Species diversity is also high because the area is relatively untouched by human development. It is an isolated area, with no history of extensive resource exploitation or intensive farming. The only significant human presence has been in mobile pastoral use.

== Protections ==
There are several significant nationally protected area that reach into this ecoregion:

- Uvs Nuur Strictly Protected Area (Mongolia), which covers almost have the surface area of the region.
- Ubsunur Hollow Nature Reserve (Russia), a series of ecologically representative small protected areas on the northern (Russian) edge of the Uvs Lake basin.
- Khar Us Nuur National Park (Mongolia) is one of a series of five flow-through (connected lakes) in the basin.

== See also ==
- List of ecoregions in Russia
- List of ecoregions in Mongolia
