= Alashan Plateau semi-desert =

Ecoregion in the Gobi Desert

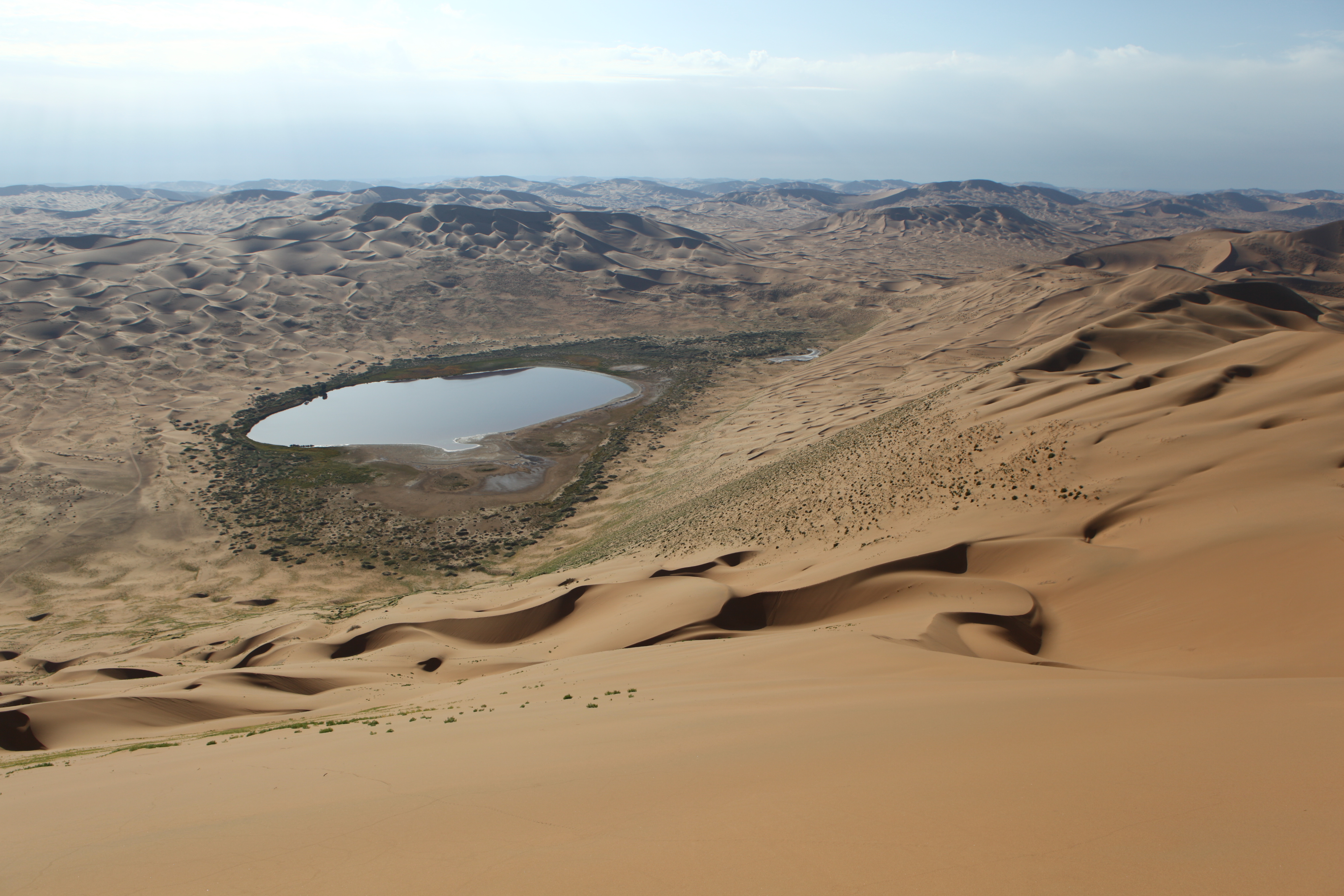
- View from Bilutu Peak

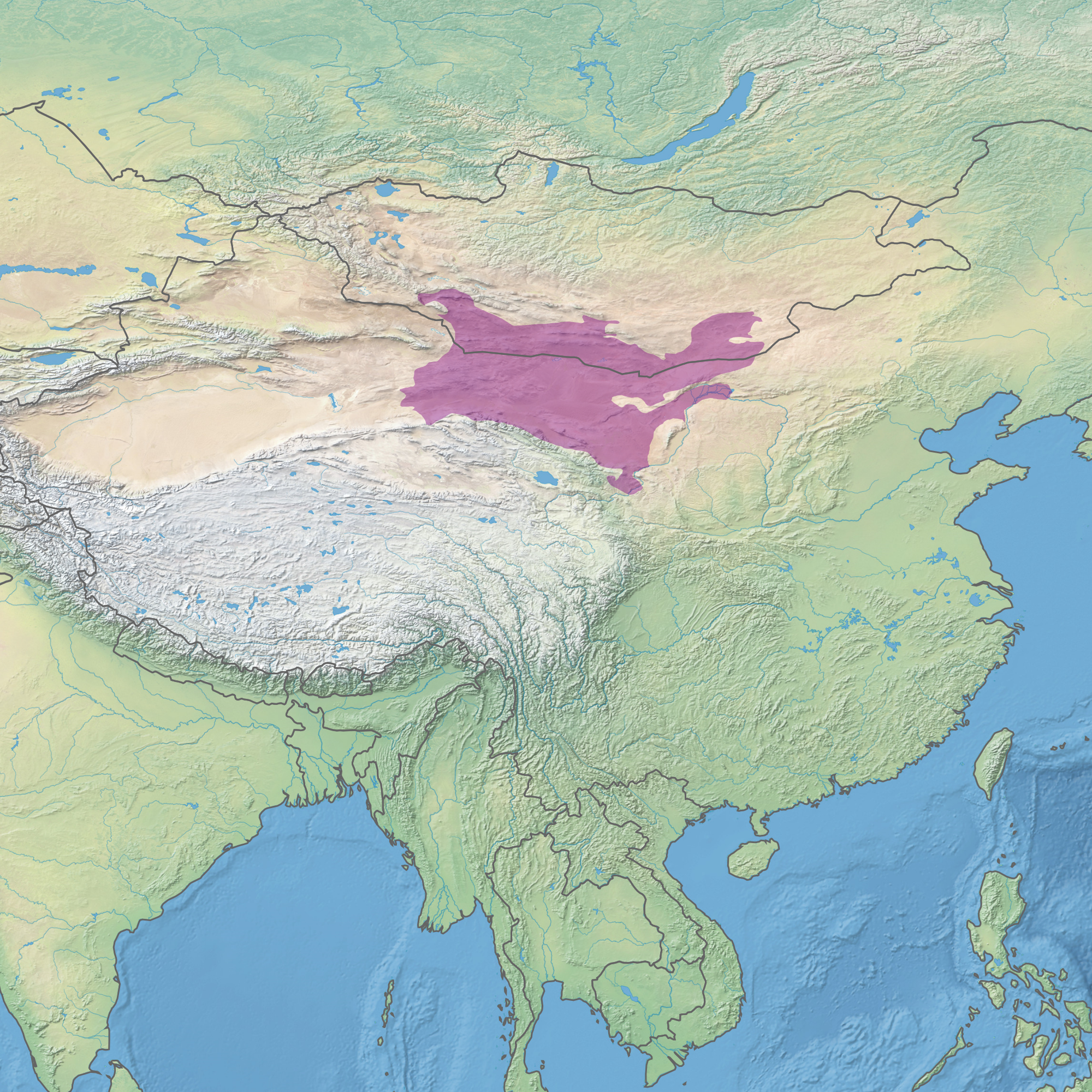
- Ecoregion territory (in purple)

Ecology
- Realm: Palearctic
- Biome: Deserts and xeric shrublands

Geography
- Area: 673,397 km^{2} (260,000 mi^{2})
- Country: China, Mongolia
- Coordinates: 40°45′N 100°30′E

The Alashan Plateau semi-desert ecoregion (WWF ID: PA1302) covers the southwestern portion of the Gobi Desert where precipitation in the mountains is sufficient for a short part of the summer to support sparse plant life. The terrain is basin and range, with elevations from 1,000 to 2,500 metres (3,300 to 8,200 ft). The region straddles the China–Mongolian border, with the Tibetan Plateau to the south, and the more arid regions of the Gobi to the north and east.

== Location and description ==
The ecoregion encompasses the desert basins and low mountains bordered by the Lop Desert on the west, the Tibetan Plateau and Qilian Mountains to the south, the Gobi extension of the Altai Mountains on the north, and the Helan Mountains to the southeast. This part of the Gobi desert is in the rain shadow of the Tibetan Plateau. However, parts of it still receive enough precipitation to support areas of semi-arid desert plant communities.

== Climate ==
The climate of the ecoregion is a cool arid climate (Köppen BWk). This climate is characteristic of arid climates that typically have precipitation far below potential evapotranspiration. Several months average below 0 °C (32 °F). Annual precipitation on the Alashan Plateau is under 150 millimetres (6 in)/year.

== Flora and fauna ==
Plant communities of the Alashan Plateau use various strategies to form and survive. While the ecoregion does have areas of sand and bare rock, there are also low-lying areas with plants that are salt-tolerant (halophytes) and adapted to the low levels of precipitation (xerophytes). Shrubs such as saxaul (Haloxylon ammodendron) and the semi-perennial Reaumuria soongorica add stability to the soil and attract associated species. Areas with more moisture support semi-desert communities of wormwoods (Artemisia), bean caper (Zygophyllum), and Calligonum mongolicum. Runoff from the Qilian Mountains supports some grasslands, and the Yellow River, which runs along the eastern edge, supports river forests of desert poplar (Populus euphratica) and Tamarix species.

There is one mammal endemic to the Alashan Plateau, Przewalski's gerbil.

== Protections ==
The Gobi Gurvansaikhan National Park is in Mongolia's north-central part of the ecoregion.

== See also ==
- List of ecoregions in China
- List of ecoregions in Mongolia
