= Selenge–Orkhon forest steppe =

Ecoregion in Mongolia

Coordinates: 49.25°N 101.75°E

Selenge-Orkhon forest steppe
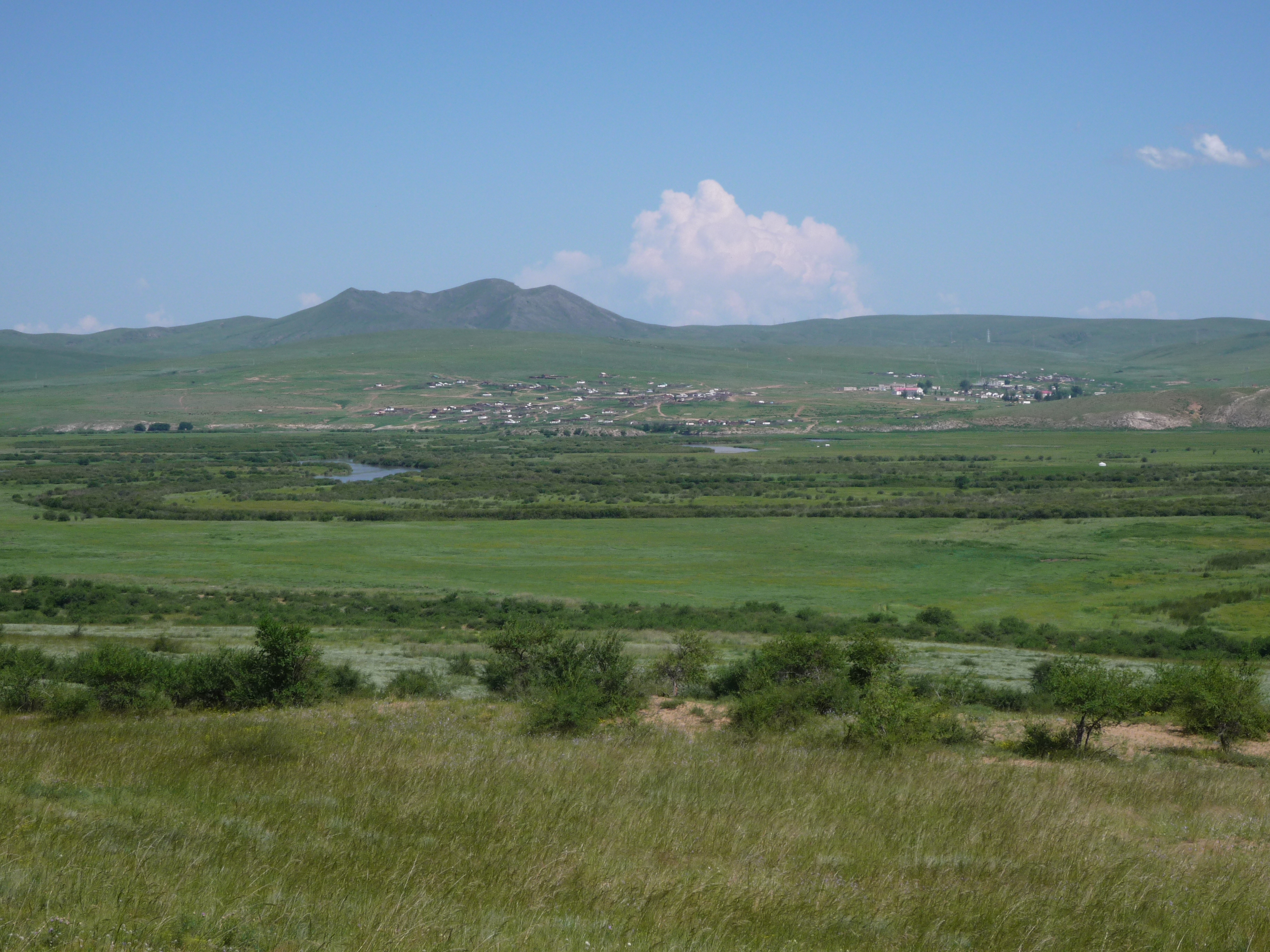
- Orkhon river valley, in Selenge Province, Mongolia

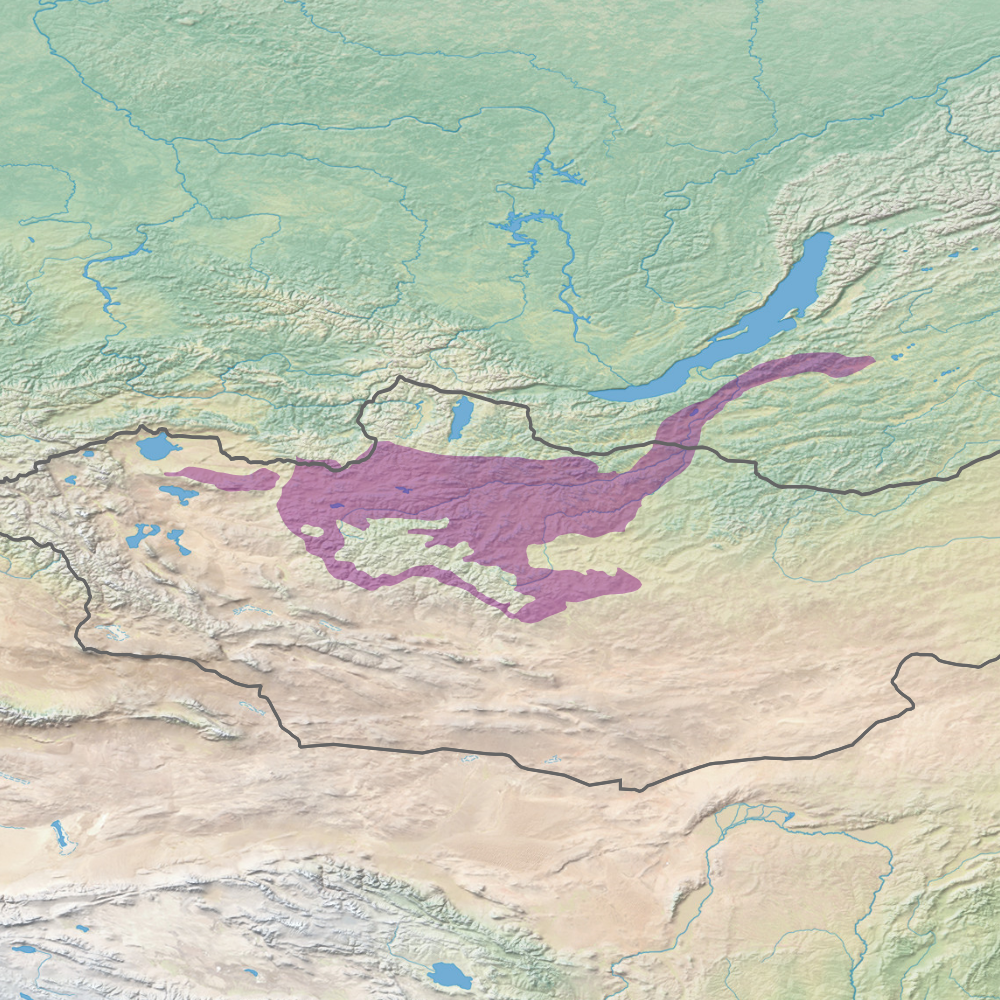
- Ecoregion territory (in purple)

Ecology
- Realm: Palearctic
- Biome: Temperate grasslands, savannas, and shrublands

Geography
- Area: 227,660 km^{2} (87,900 mi^{2})
- Countries: Mongolia, Russia

The Selenge–Orkhon forest steppe ecoregion (WWF ID: PA0816) stretches across north central Mongolia, and follows the Selenga River northeast into Russia. The ecoregion is itself at high elevations, but surrounded by higher mountain ranges. As a transition zone between taiga (to the north) and steppe, it features conifer forests on the north slopes of mountains, and pine/aspen stands on southern slopes. It has an area of 227,660 square kilometres (87,900 mi^{2}).

== Location and description ==
The ecoregion spans roughly 1,000 km, from the Khan-Khokhi mountains in the Baruunturuun district of western Mongolia, to Ulan-Ude, the capital city of Buryatia in Russia, just east of Lake Baikal. Along the way it passes through the drainage basin of the upper Selenge River and its tributaries, the valley of the Orkhon River, and along the Selenge River Valley into Russia. In the middle, the ecoregion wraps around the higher forested area of the Khangai Mountains. The mean altitude of the area is 800–1200 meters, with peaks ranging up to 2900 meters.

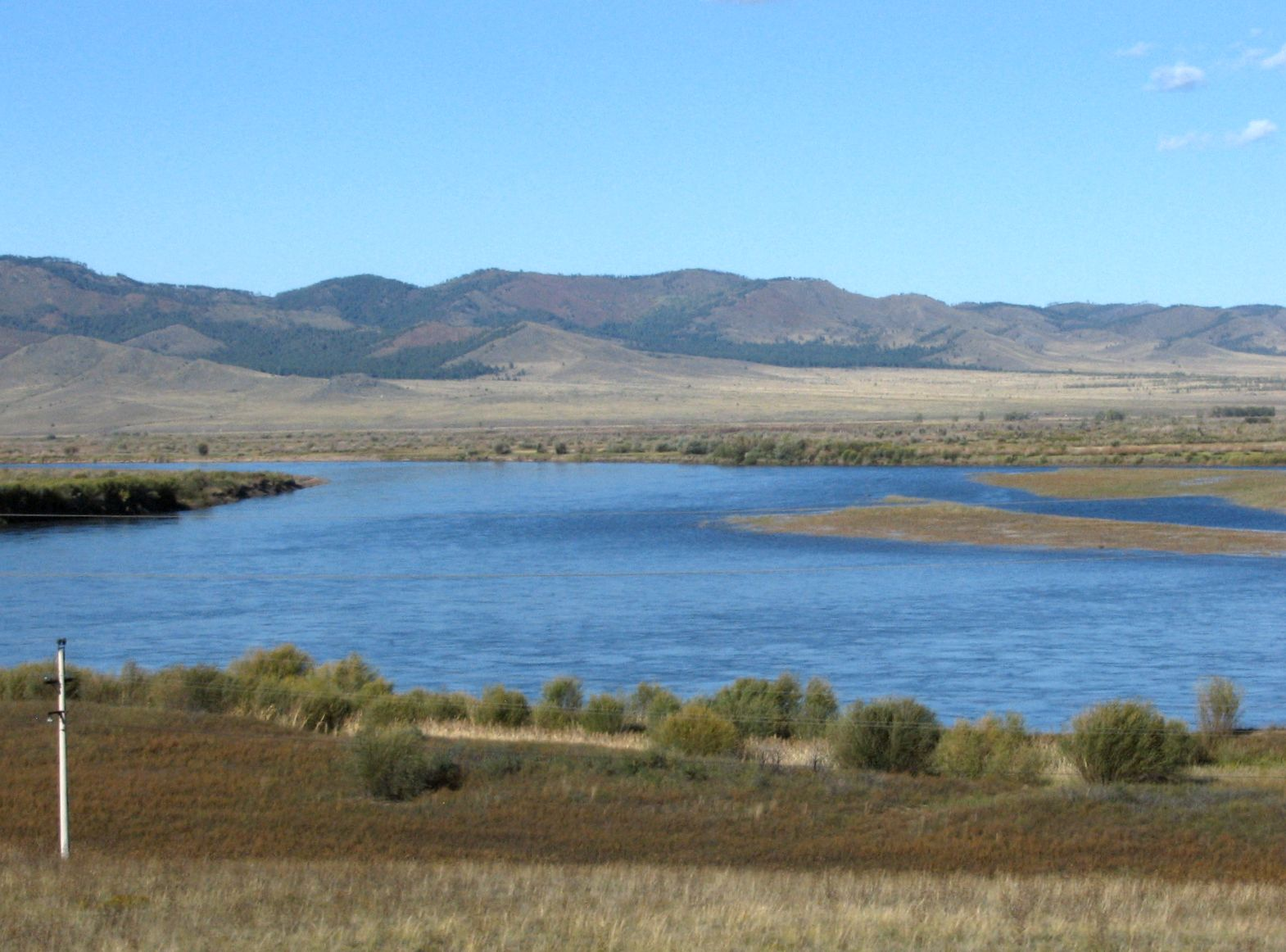
Selenge River, 100-200 km from Russian border. Note trees on hillside.

== Climate ==
The region has a dry-winter subarctic climate (Köppen classification Dwc), although it borders closely on both a dry-winter humid continental climate (Dwb) and on a cool semi-arid climate (BSk). This climate is characterized by high variation in temperature, both daily and seasonally; with long, cold winters and short, cool summers with only three months averaging over 10 °C (50 °F). There is sufficient precipitation (averaging up to 300 mm/year) to support sparse stands of trees, surrounded by steppe vegetation. The mean temperature at the center of the ecoregion is −27.7 °C (−17.9 °F) in January, and 14.7 °C (58.5 °F) in July.

== Flora and fauna ==
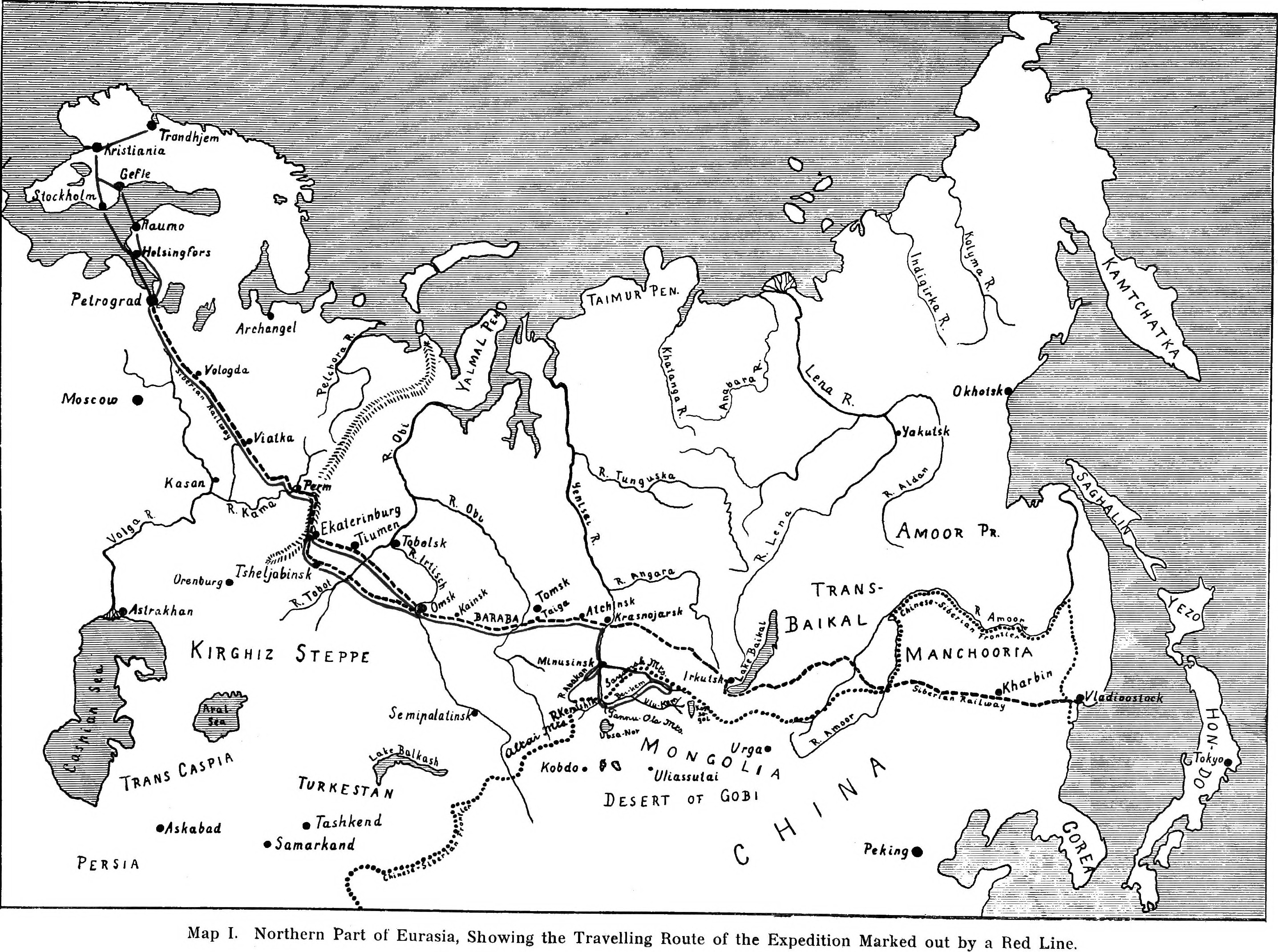
The vegetation of the Siberian-Mongolian frontiers (the Sayansk region)

Northern slopes of mountains in the ecoregion feature coniferous forests, while the southern slopes typically feature “open steppe” forest stands that are primarily Scots pine (Pinus sylvestris) and aspen (Populus tremula). About 40 percent of the area is dominated by Stipa cleistogenes (feathergrass).

== Protections ==
The ecoregion is under pressure from grazing. There are relatively few protected areas for an ecoregion of its size. One is Khan-Khokhi Khyargas Mountain National Park, which covers much of the Khan Khokhii mountains, a small (100 km-long) mountain range northeast of Khyargas Nuur (Lake).

== See also ==
- List of ecoregions in Russia
- List of ecoregions in Mongolia
