= Mongolian–Manchurian grassland =

Ecoregion in East Asia

Coordinates: 47°N 119°E

Mongolian-Manchurian grassland
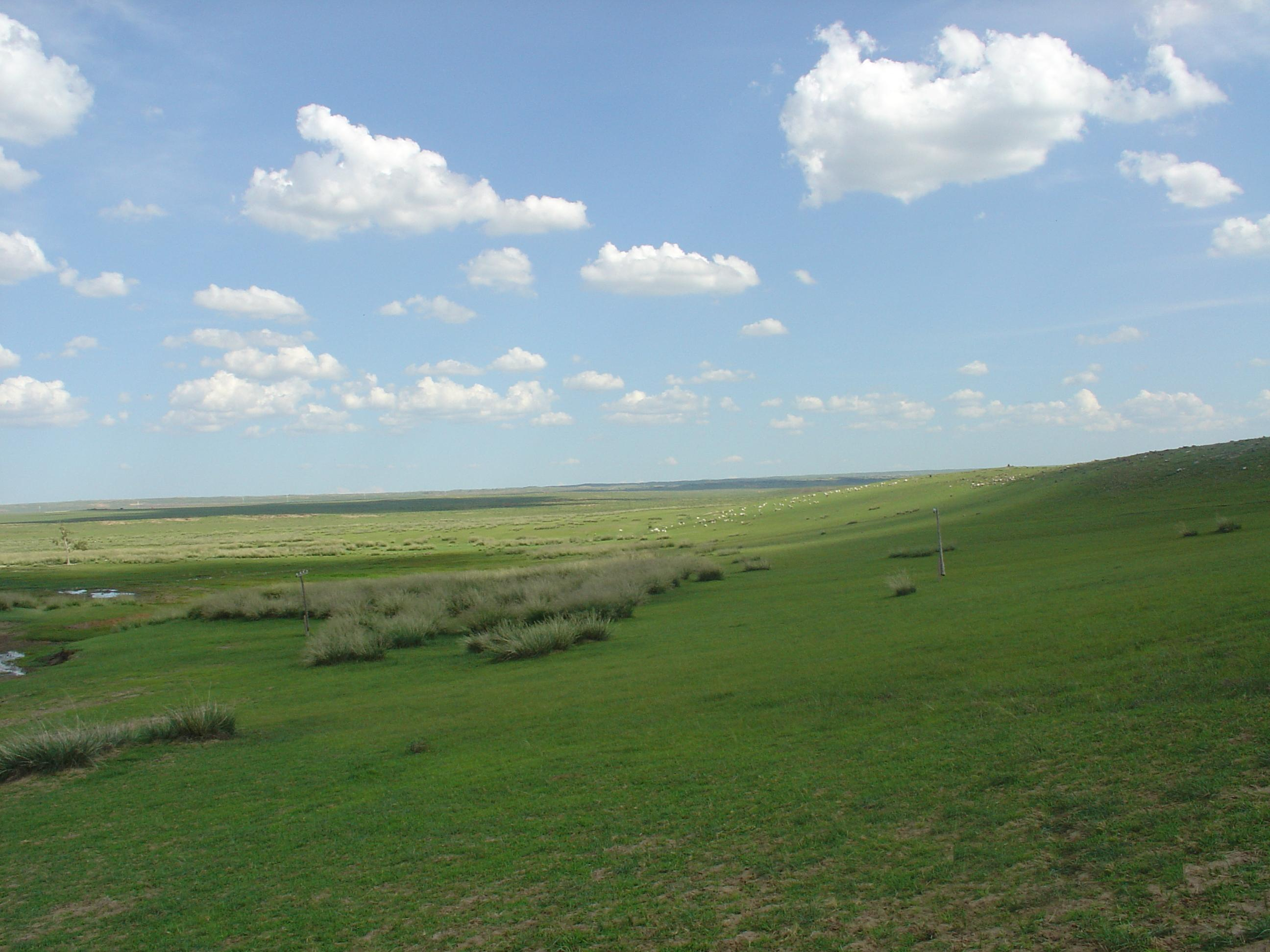

- Map of ecoregion in China and Mongolia

Ecology
- Realm: Palearctic
- Biome: Temperate grasslands, savannas, and shrublands

Geography
- Area: 887,000 km^{2} (342,000 sq mi)
- Countries: China; Mongolia, Russia

Conservation
- Conservation status: Critical/endangered
- Protected: 5.09%

The Mongolian-Manchurian grassland, also known as the Mongolian-Manchurian steppe or Gobi-Manchurian steppe, in the temperate grassland biome, is an ecoregion in East Asia covering parts of Mongolia, the Chinese Autonomous region of Inner Mongolia, and Northeast China.

== Setting ==
The Mongolian-Manchurian grassland (Chinese: 蒙古高原草原-内蒙古草原-东北草原) covers an area of 887,300 square kilometers (342,600 sq mi). This temperate grasslands, savannas, and shrublands ecoregion of the Palearctic realm forms a large crescent around the Gobi Desert, extending across central and eastern Mongolia into the eastern portion of Inner Mongolia and eastern and central Manchuria, and then southwest across the North China Plain. To the northeast and north, the Selenge-Orkhon and Daurian forest steppes form a transition zone between the grassland and the forests of Siberia to the north. On the east and southeast, the grasslands transition to temperate broadleaf and mixed forests, including the Manchurian mixed forests, Northeast China Plain deciduous forests, and Central China loess plateau mixed forests. On the southwest, the grasslands extend to the Yellow River, across which is the Ordos Plateau steppe. It lies between the Altai Mountains in the west and the Greater Khingan Region in the east.

== History ==
The Mongolian-Manchurian grassland was a part of the Northern Silk Road under the Mongol Empire when the Mongols took control of China. The grasslands were not a part of the original Silk Road, but were an addition once the Mongol Empire gained control of several routes of the trade route. Many Europeans would utilize these grasslands to go east to west or west to east across the region. The grasslands also made it easier for the Mongols to expand their empire and expand into parts of China and Korea. Many travelers also utilized these grasslands to make travelling the region easier, however Marco Polo was not one of those travelers. These grasslands allowed many travelers and voyagers to bypass mountains to more easily traverse the Mongol Empire. These grasslands were at the center of the Mongol Empire, which is a main reason they were vital to the Mongols and people traveling to the Empire.

== Climate ==
The climate is hypercontinental sub-humid or semi-arid, with the Köppen classifications BSk or in the extreme east, Dwa or Dwb. The region features warm summers with decreasing rainfall from east to west, alongside frigid, extremely dry winters. Being relatively dry, from a combination of being landlocked and the proximity of the Siberian High, only select animals can live here.

== Flora ==
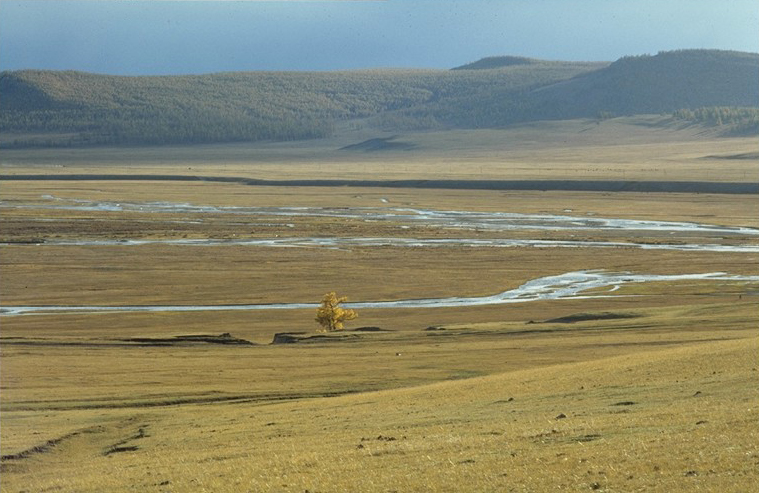

The dominant flora consists of medium to tall grasslands, dominated by feather grass (Stipa baicalensis, S. capillata, and S. grandis), sheep's fescue (Festuca ovina), Aneurolepidium chinense, Filifolium sibiricuman, and Cleistogenes sqarrosa. The drier regions surrounding the Gobi host drought-tolerant grasses, together with forbs and low, spiny shrubs.

The southwestern slopes of the Greater Khingan range support pockets of broadleaf deciduous forest, of either Mongolian oak (Quercus mongolica), or a mixture of poplar (Populus davidiana and P. suaveolens), Siberian silver birch (Betula platyphylla), and willow (Salix rorida).

There are also grasses such as:

- Feathergrass – lives long since it is rarely consumed
- Sheepgrass – perennial
- Lyme Grass – can provide food for animals

== Fauna ==
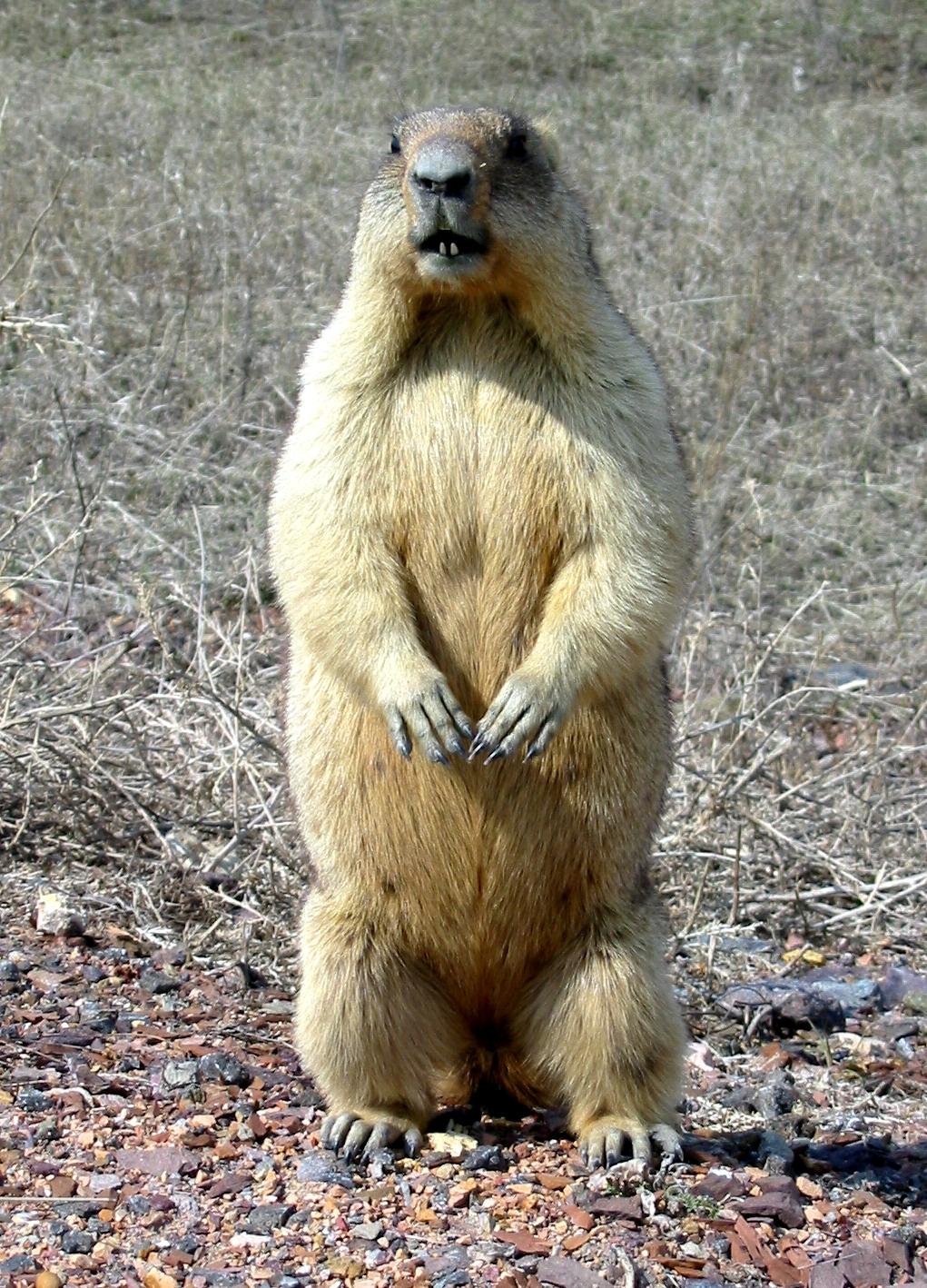
A bobak marmot

Despite its landscaping, wildlife can be found in a variety of habitats not restricted solely to the open steppe. Many are programmed to traverse vast distances in extreme weather and terrain by running, digging, and/or flying.

- The black grouse occupies the belt of steppe, forests, and mountains stretching across much of Asia.
- The black-billed capercaillie lives and forages mainly in larch taiga further north of the steppe.
- The Daurian partridge feeds and hides in dense grassland and underbrush.
- The ringneck pheasant has been introduced to similar grassland habitat in the United States for hunting and sport.
- The brown eared pheasant (Crossoptilon mantchuricum) is also adapted to the mountainous woodlands of Northeast China and other similar ecoregions.
- The bobak marmot (Marmota bobak), also known as the steppe marmot, inhabits the area
- The Mongolian wolf is found throughout the region.
- The Mongolian wild ass (or onager) once covered vast steppe, though now exist in isolated patches.
- The Mongolian gazelle is numerous here.
- The Przewalski's horse has been reintroduced here.
- The corsac fox drinks very little water, instead, obtaining it mostly through their prey.
- The bearded vulture's powerful beak can hammer large bones against hard rock.
- The Eurasian goshawk can be found in deciduous and coniferous woodland edges.
- The steppe eagle specializes in seizing ground squirrels and other small mammals from their dens.
- The steppe lemming is a very important prey base. Their presence in an area can limit the presence of other voles. Unfortunately, they can also very easily reduce vegetation if necessary. They are very good at burrowing in the terrain. They have a very big migration when it may get too cold.
- The Daurian hedgehog is found in the forest-steppe and grasslands.

== Environmental issues ==
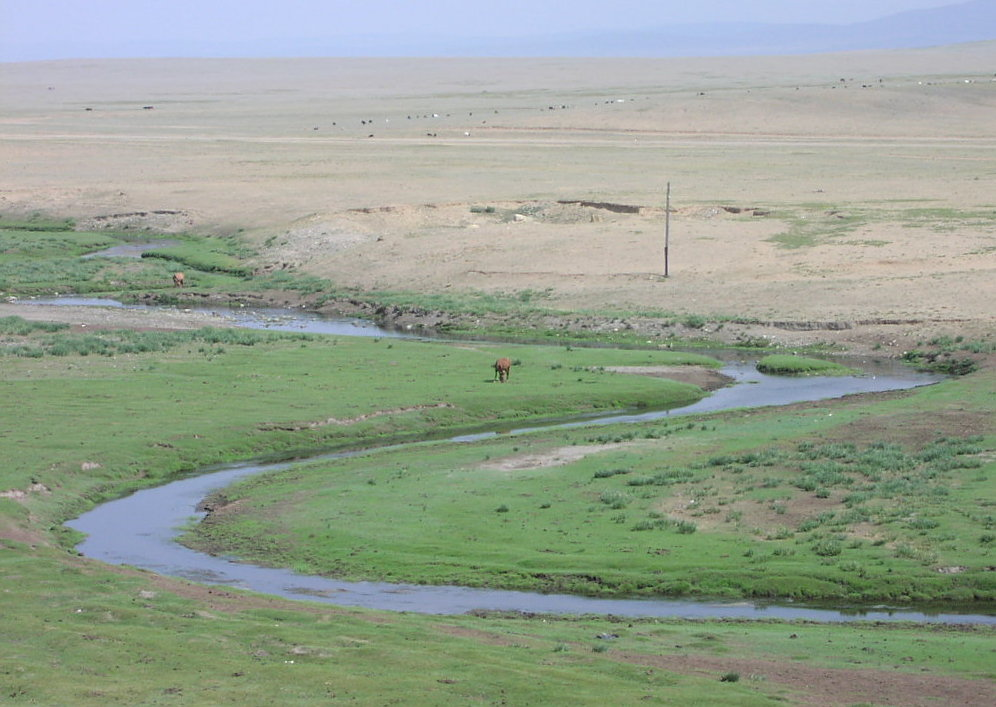

In the winter the grass becomes dry and very flammable, making wildfires more common. Grass recovers quickly from the fire, but trees do not. This partially explains the absence of trees in the area. There are also seasonal droughts in the grasslands, typically occurring during summer.

== Culture ==
The majority of people in the steppe are Mongolian nomads. Families in the Mongolian steppe live in "gers" which are a type of large portable tent. Mongolians are also master horse riders so many families own many horses that roam the steppe. The people in the steppe use the animals there for their food and drink. They also have a very prominent musical culture with a wide variety of traditional Mongolian songs.

== Conservation and threats ==
The Mongolian-Manchurian grassland faces threat from human expansion, though in most of its eastern area, it has not been altered by agriculture as much as its reaches in its western area, or similar grasslands in North America.

== Protected areas ==
5.09% of the ecoregion is in protected areas. Protected areas include:

- Lkhachinvandad uul Nature Reserve (IUCN Category IV)
- Batkhaan uul Nature Reserve (IUCN Category IV)
- Xianghai Ramsar Site
- Zhalong Ramsar Site
- Dornod Mongol Strictly Protected Area (IUCN Category Ib)
- Numrug National Park (IUCN Category Ib)
- Mongol Daguur Strictly Protected Area (IUCN Category Ib)
- Mongol Daguur (Mongolian Dauria) Ramsar Site
- Hustai National Park (IUCN Category II)
- Ugtam uul Nature Reserve (IUCN Category IV)
- Torey Lakes Ramsar Site
- Khangain nuruu National Park (IUCN Category II)
- Toson-Khulslai Nature Reserve (IUCN Category IV)
- Khar yamaat Nature Reserve (IUCN Category IV)
- Yakhi nuur Nature Reserve (IUCN Category IV)
- Dalai Lake National Nature Reserve, Inner Mongolia Ramsar Site
- Buir Lake and its surrounding wetlands Ramsar Site
- Ganga Lake and its surrounding wetlands Ramsar Site
- Khugnu-Tarna National Park (IUCN Category II)
- Moltsog Els National Park (IUCN Category II)
- Orkhonii khundii National Park (IUCN Category II)
- Choiriin Bogd uul Nature Reserve (IUCN Category IV)
- Ongon Tavan bulag Nature Reserve (IUCN Category IV)
- Baga gazriin chuluu Nature monument (IUCN Category III)
- Darkhan uul Nature Reserve (IUCN Category IV)
- Kherlen Toono uul Nature Reserve (IUCN Category IV)
- Bayantsagaani tal Nature Reserve (IUCN Category IV)
- Darkhankhaan uul Nature monument (IUCN Category III)
- Undurkhaan uul National Park (IUCN Category II)
- Dariganga National Park (IUCN Category II)
- Jilin Momoge National Nature Reserve Ramsar Site
- Landscapes of Dauria World Heritage Site
- Ikh gazriin chuluu National Park (IUCN Category II)
- Borzinskoe Sol`-ozero Natural Monument (IUCN Category III)
- Sredneargunskij State Natural Zakaznik (IUCN Category IV)
