= Mongol Daguur =

Steppe and wetland region in Dornod Province, Mongolia

- IUCN category Ib (wilderness area)
- Location within Mongolia
- Location: Dornod, Mongolia
- Coordinates: 49°42′0″N 115°6′0″E
- Area: 156 km^{2} (60 mi^{2}); 358 km^{2} (138 mi^{2})(conservation area)
- Established: 1998

Ramsar Wetland
- Designated: 8 December 1997
- Reference no.: 924

UNESCO World Heritage Site
- Type: Natural
- Criteria: ix, x
- Designated: 2017 (41st session)
- Reference no.: 1448

Mongol Daguur (Mongolian: Монгол дагуур, also referred to as Mongolian Dauria) is a steppe and wetland region in Mongolia listed as a UNESCO Biosphere Reserve and Ramsar Site of International Importance. A transboundary ecoregion straddling three countries, the area is located in Dornod Province of eastern Mongolia, and is contiguous with the Daurian ecoregion in Russia and the Hulun Lake wetlands in China. The area is categorized as a Strictly Protected Area within the framework of protected areas in Mongolia.

It covers 8,429,072 hectares (20,828,690 acres) and was designated as a UNESCO Biosphere Reserve in 2005. Together with Ugtam Nature refuge and Daursky Nature Reserve in Russia it constitutes a World Heritage Site named "The Landscapes of Dauria".

== History ==
Mongol Daguur was declared a biosphere reserve by UNESCO in 2005. A biosphere reserve aims to preserve the environment while allowing local communities to be involved in sustainable development. The core area of a biosphere reserve is strictly protected, the buffer zone is used for research and similar activities, and the transition zone allows the local communities to undertake ecologically sustainable activities.

== Description ==
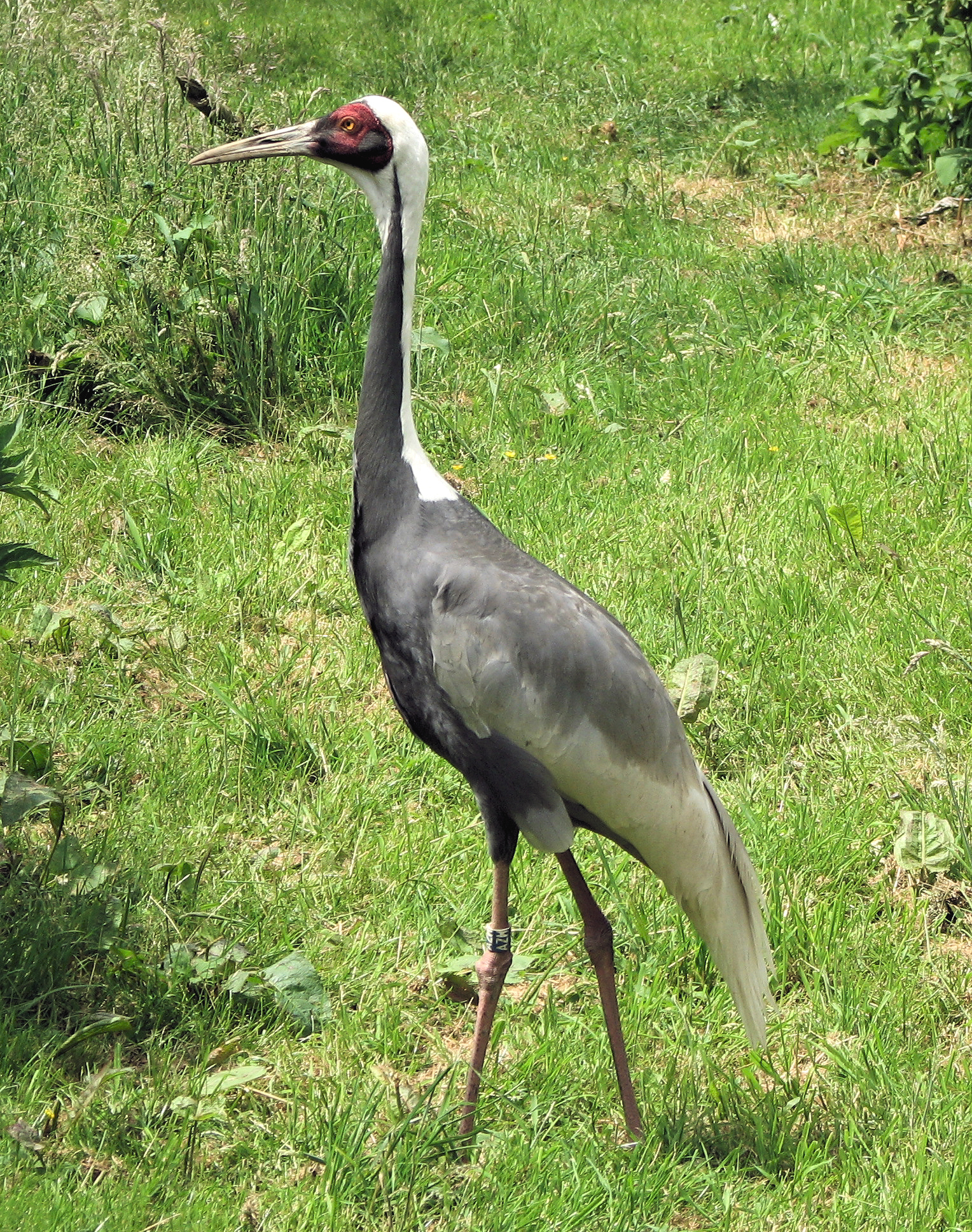
White-naped crane

Mongol Daguur has a total area of 8,429,072 hectares (20,828,690 acres) and is located between 46°06' to 46°52'N and 116°11' to 118°27'E. Its altitudinal range is between 700 and 1,100 m (2,300 and 3,600 ft) above sea level. It consists of a core area of about 570,374 hectares (1,409,420 acres) surrounded by a buffer zone of 1,072,220 hectares (2,649,500 acres) and a transition area of 6,786,477 hectares (16,769,750 acres). Habitats present include temperate steppe, rocky outcrops, sand dunes and marshes.

Mongol Daguur's steppe and wetlands territory mainly consists of low mountainous landscapes that support a variety of fauna and flora. The biosphere reserve provides nesting and breeding grounds for globally endangered species such as the white-naped crane, while also serving as a migratory stopover site for many rare and endangered species.

The reserve is divided into two areas. The larger, northern area lies alongside a protected area in Russia, the Daursky Nature Reserve. It lies to the south of Lake Barun-Torey and consists of grass steppes and some wetlands. The smaller, southern area consists of the Ulz River basin and associated wetlands. This area is home to the rare white-naped crane (Grus vipio) and other species of crane. The core zone is designated as a Special Protected Area and is managed for the conservation of the herds of Mongolian gazelle (Procapra gutturosa). The transition areas are used for sustainable tourism, and for grazing livestock, the culling of wildlife as necessary, forest maintenance, and the gathering of medicinal plants for household use by the pastoral population of about 11,800 residents.

== See also ==
- Dauria International Protected Area
