= Alkhanay National Park =

Nature reserve in Zabaykalsky Krai, Russia

- Алханай
- IUCN category II (national park)
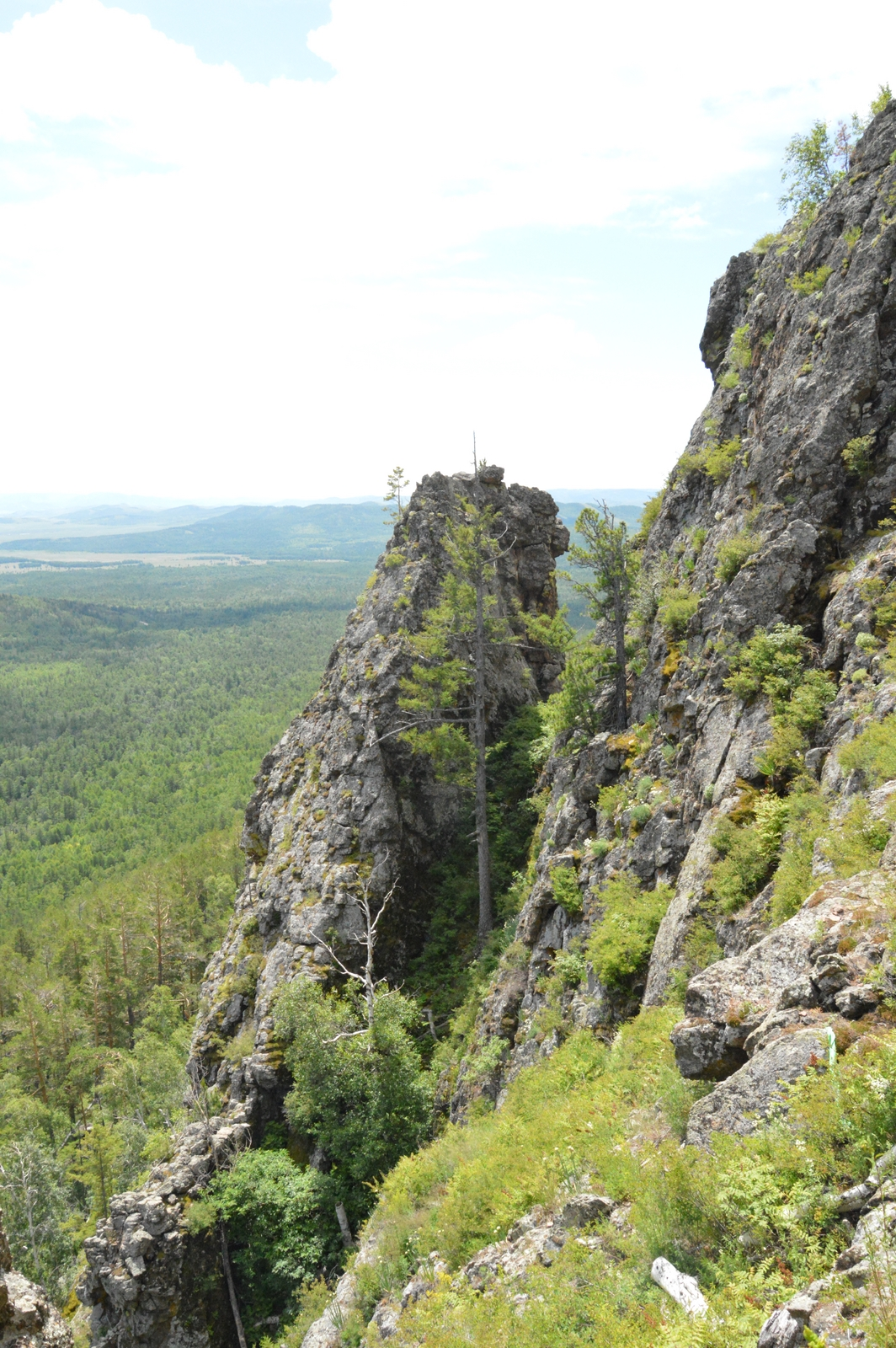
- Alkhanay National Park

- Location within Russia
- Location: Zabaykalsky Krai
- Nearest city: Chita, Zabaykalsky Krai
- Coordinates: 50°50′N 113°25′E
- Area: 138,234 hectares (341,584 acres; 1,382 km^{2}; 534 sq mi)
- Established: May 15, 1999
- Governing body: FGBU "Alkhanaya"
- Website: http://npalania.ru/

Alkhanay National Park (Russian: Национальный парк «Алханай») encompasses the area around Mt. Alkhanai, a central focus and sacred mountain to the Buryats people, who today are the largest indigenous group in Siberia. Mt. Alkanai has been adopted as sacred by later Mongols, shamanistic people, and Buddhists. The Dalai Lama has made two unofficial visits to Alkhanay. The area takes its name from an old legend, in which a princess took refuge from her pursuers on the top of the mountain, defiantly shouting as they approached, "kill me!", which translates to "Alkhanai" in the local language. Despite the ancient name, the focus today of Buddhist pilgrims as they ascend the mountain pathway is one of peacefulness and healing. The park seeks to balance support for continued pilgrimage to the rock landforms and mineral springs, with conservation of nature and recreational tourism. Alkhanay NP is located in the Trans-Baikal (East Siberia) region of Russia, about 300 miles east of the lake, and 75 miles north of Mongolia's northern border. It is in the administrative region of Aginsky District, Zabaykalsky Krai.

== Topography ==
The area is one of steppe-forest on mountains of medium-height (1,000-1,200 meters). The park lies in the transitional zone between the East Siberian taiga to the north, and the Mongolian Steppe province of the Eurasian steppe to the south. It is situated in the Duldurginsky District of Agin-Buryat Okrug in Zabaykalsky Krai. The Mt. Alkhanai massive (1,663 m) dominates the southern slope of the local mountain range (the Mogotuyskogo Range). The park streams feed the Onon River, which is one of the westernmost tributaries of the Amur River, which flows 1,000 miles to the northern Pacific.

The landscapes of the park include forested mountains, steep canyons with streams and waterfalls, springs, and vistas of the vast undulating plains to the south. the tops of the mountains are mostly dome-shaped with bare rock in places. The rock landforms reflect the ancient remains of volcanoes (including Mt. Alkhanai itself), and an underlying fault on which the area was centered in the Jurassic period. There are few lakes, but many wetlands along the streams, and the many springs are cold with calcium carbonate.

== Climate and ecoregion ==
The region has a subarctic climate (Köppen climate classification Dwc). The Siberian High makes the winters so dry (typically with around 5 millimetres or 0.20 inches of rainfall equivalent per month) that snow cover is very limited. Summers are short and relatively cool. The characteristic habitat is temperate grassland, savanna, and shrubland. Mean temperatures range from −12.4 °F or −24.7 °C in January to 63.1 °F or 17.3 °C in July. Average annual precipitation is 14.1 inches or 358.1 millimetres.

The ecoregion of Alkhanay is Daurian forest steppe. This region has been described as a "sea of grass that forms the best and most intact example of an undisturbed steppe ecosystem and is also one of the last areas in the Palearctic that still supports stable herds of larger vertebrates" in a semi-mountainous area.

The park's 37 streams form most of the catchment area of the Ilya river, a tributary of the Onon River. The freshwater ecoregion is Temperate Upland River, in this case designated by the WWF as the "Shilka (Amur) Freshwater Ecoregion (WWF ID #619)". The hilly streams of the Onon region lack the migratory fish found in the lower Amur, and are characterized by the species found on temperate streams with steep forest banks. There is only one endemic species of fish known in the ecoregion - the Bagrid catfish (Pseudobagrus herzensteini), a species reliably known in only the hilly streams of the Onon and Shilka rivers. There are known to be 18 species of fish in the lakes of the park.

== Pilgrimage sites ==
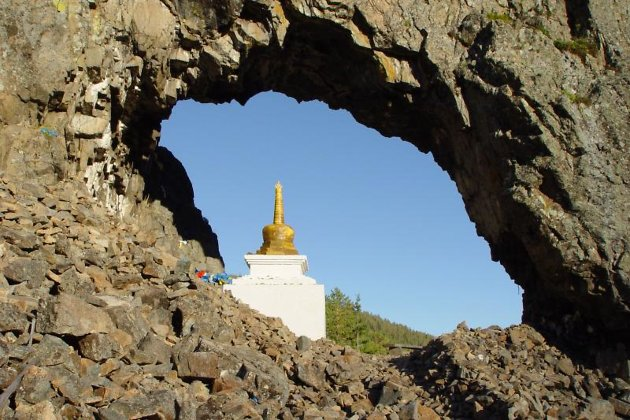
"Temple Gate" Rock formation

Mt. Alkhanai is one of the "Five Sacred Peaks" of Northern Buddhism. A significant portion of the visitors to the park are pilgrims, particularly drawn to specific landmarks: mineral springs, rock landforms, and rock-lined mountain trails. Prominent are "Demchog Sume", home of the guardian deity Alkhanov Demchog (yidam Chakrasamvara), "Temple Gate" - a rock with an opening in the center through which pilgrims pass for healing, and "Naro Hazhod", a place of meditation for Buddhist clergy and others. The Buddhist sites on Mt. Alkhanay include paths and platforms for rites to be performed by daily visitors as well as larger ceremonies held at various times during the year by local Buddhist spiritual leaders.

There are 16 natural cultic sites in the park, reflecting the various groups that have dwelt in the area even before Buddhism. There are ancient cave drawings, tiled graves from the 6th century BCE, various sites associated with Buyrat and shamanistic traditions, two Buddhist stupas (including one marking the landing spot of the helicopter than carried the Dalai Lama on a visit to the park in 1991). and the pilgrimage "path to the top of Mt. Alkhanai".

== Plants ==
There are three altitude zones of plants in Alkhanay: the forest-steppe zone at the base of the mountains (900 m), a forest belt (ceder and pine, with some spruce and fir), and a sub-alpine level of mostly larch towards the peaks. At the higher levels, the Daurian larch is stunted, typically reaching to only 2 meters, with a crown bent by the prevailing northwesterly winds. Other stunted growth at upper levels are the creeping cedar (heights to 50 cm); Sakhalin raspberries (7–10 cm), and Siberian mountain ash (25–35 cm); in stonier places there is Siberian juniper. The undergrowth of the forest belt includes alder bush, willow, rhododendron, and blueberry. Towards the borders, ground pine is a common ground cover. Tundra vegetation is absent, and steppe vegetation is mostly found at the base of Mt. Alkhanay and to the south.

The area provides a wide variety of plants with local medicinal and folk history. One study in 1996 identified 340 species of plants in the park, of which 180 had known uses in local folk practices, including Rose root, astragalus membranous (a type of milk vetch), Baikal skullcap, and many others. Some botanists estimate that there are 700 species of plants in the park, but the area is still not fully studied.

== Animals ==
Alkhanay is excellent habitat for birds, with grouse in the higher shrub areas, partridges in the edge zones, woodpeckers and nutcrackers in the middle forests, and finches in steppe habitats at the lower elevations. The abundance of small rodents attracts birds of prey, including nesting eagles, harriers, owls, and vultures. In the wetlands there are many wading birds, including the Demoiselle crane, ducks, and shorebirds. The park also provides protected zones for lizards. The largest mammals include black bear, roe deer, elk, red deer, lynx and sable. The park has reported, at the higher elevations, the presence of musk.

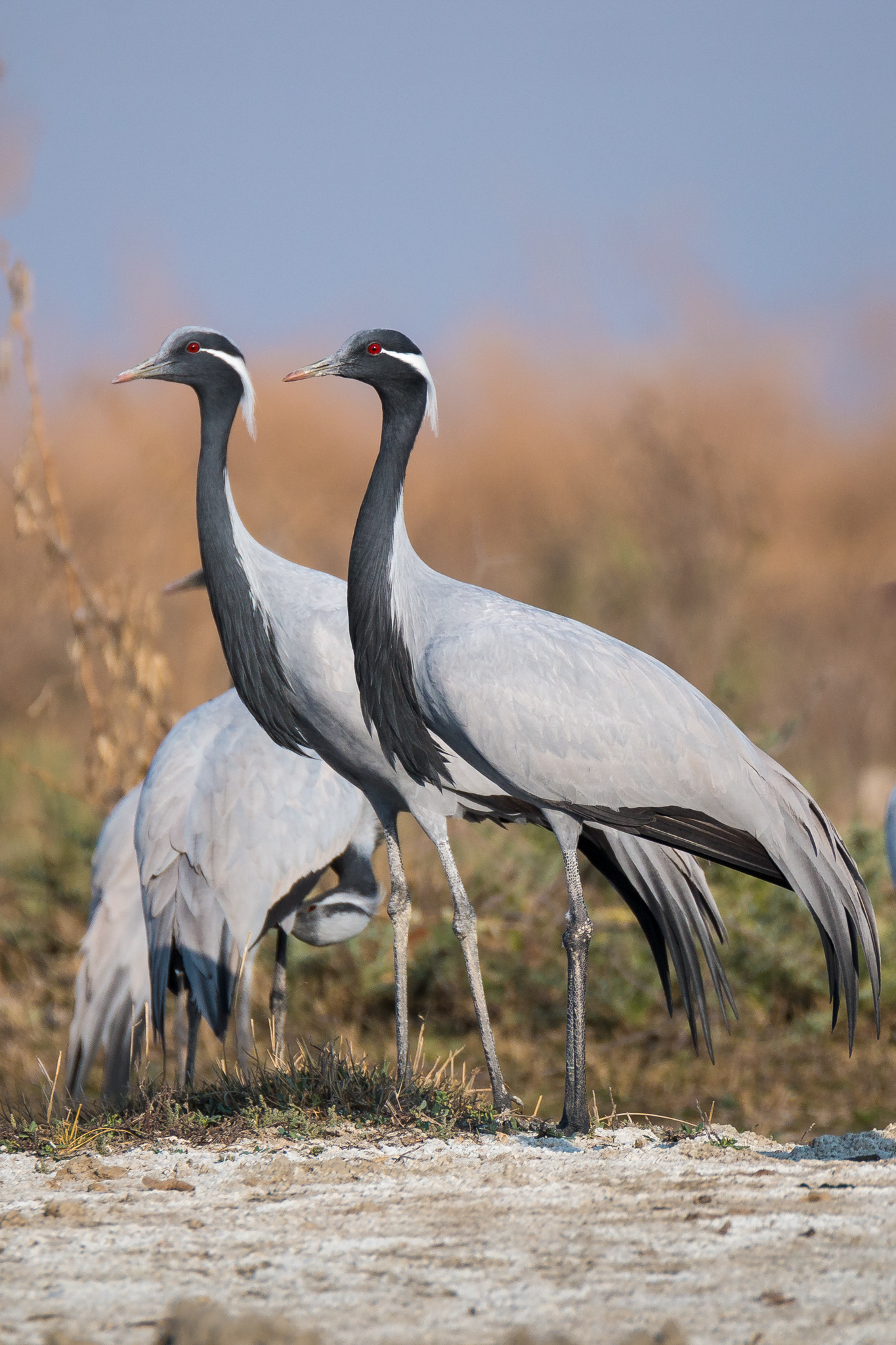
Demoiselle Cranes

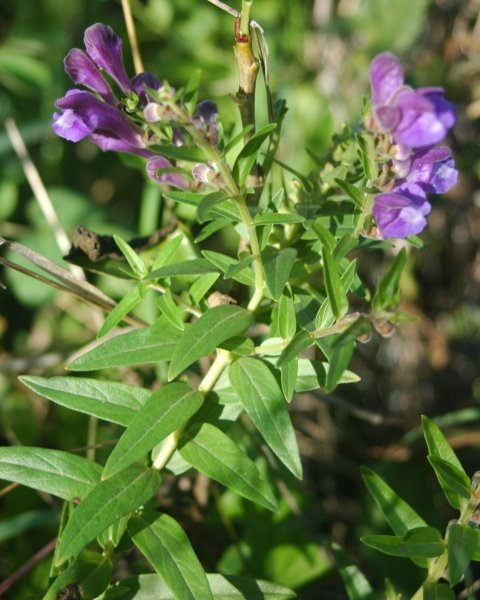
Baikal Skullcap, one of the "50 fundamental herbs" of Chinese herbology

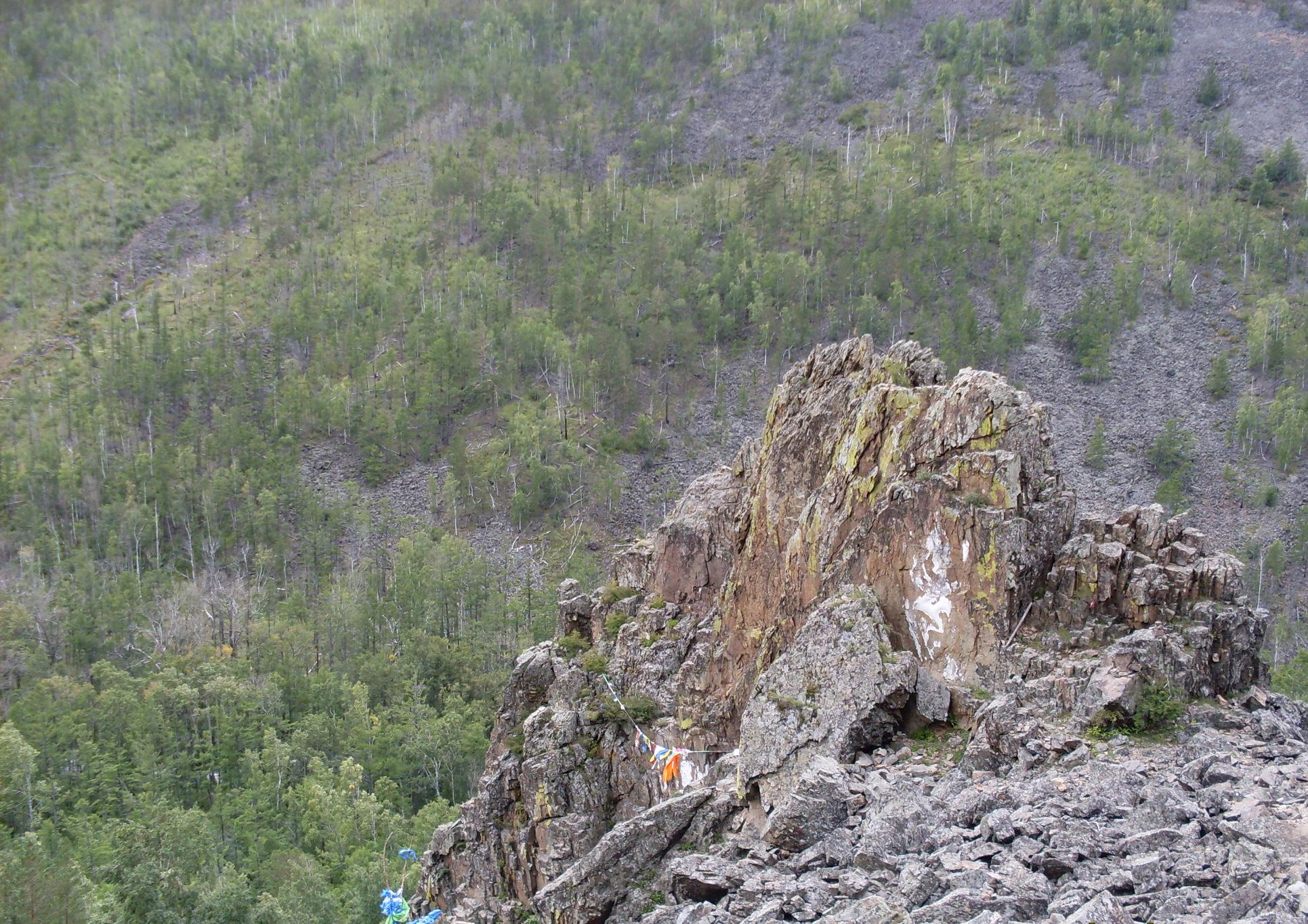
Rock formation, Alkhanay NP

== Tourism ==
The park can be reached from Chita, Zabaykalsky Krai by Highway A167 to the town of Duldirga (250 km). The city of Chita is on the Trans-Siberian Railway, 6,199 km east of Moscow, and 3,900 km west of Vladivostok.

As with most national parks in Russia, Alkhanay is divided into separate zones, providing protected areas for nature, areas of limited resources management, and recreational areas for tourists. The recreational areas feature well-developed trails to the landmarks for all ages and abilities. A fee is charged at the entrance, and park employees are available as guides for tour groups and individuals. Accommodations are available at two different hostels (run by the park and the local district government, outside cabin rental, and campgrounds.

== Gallery ==
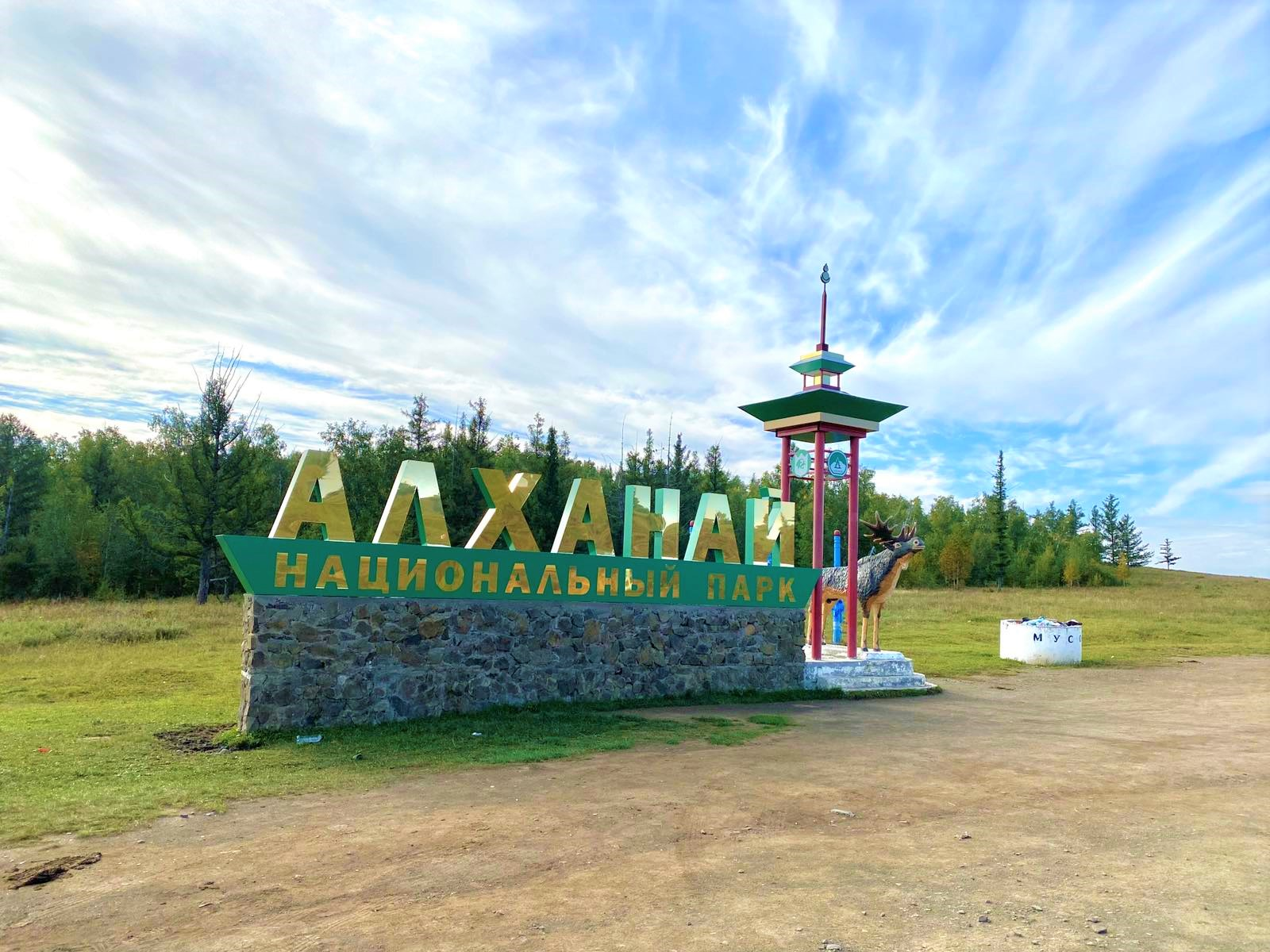
At the entrance to the park

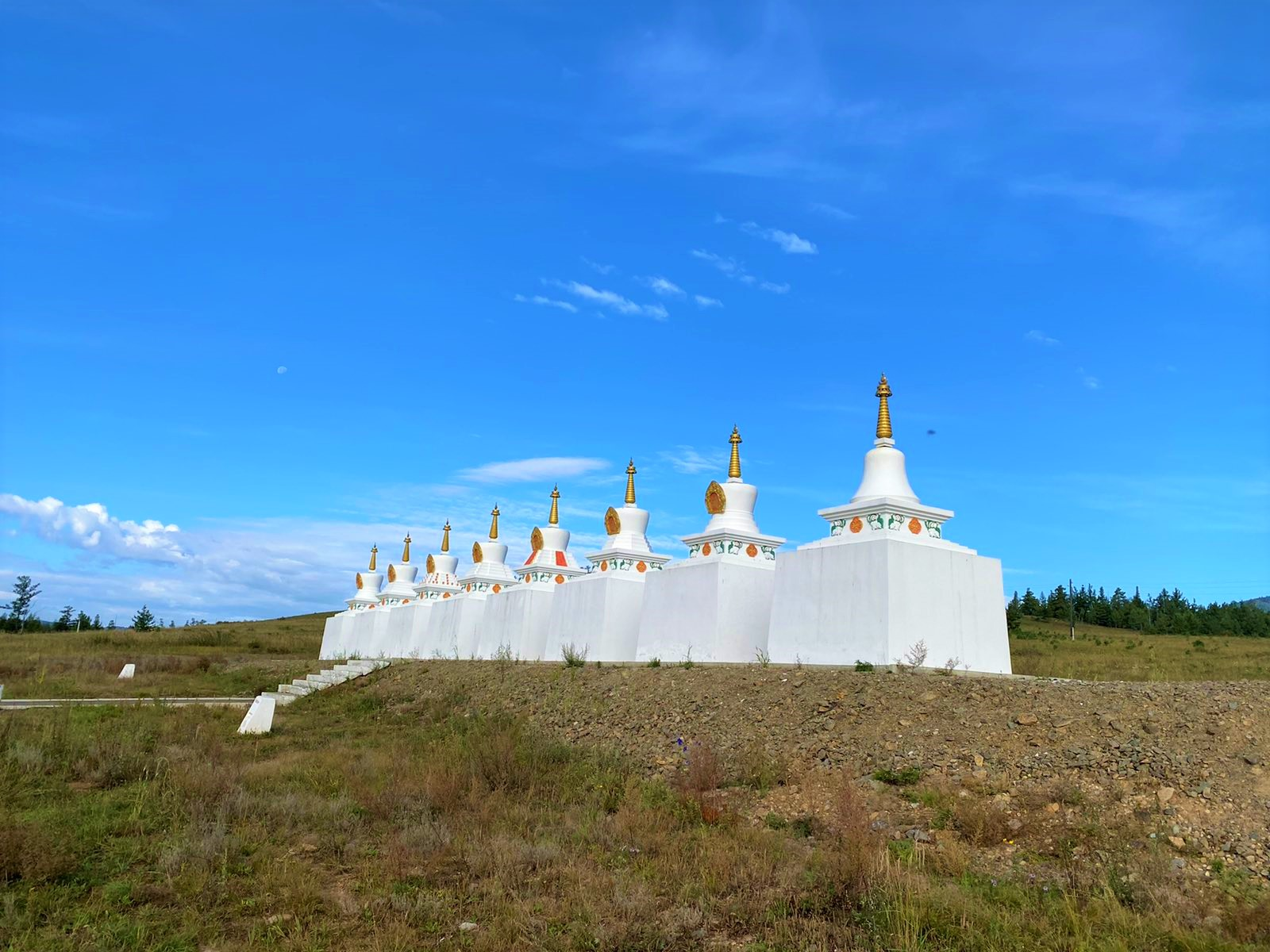
Buddhist stupas in Alkhanay park

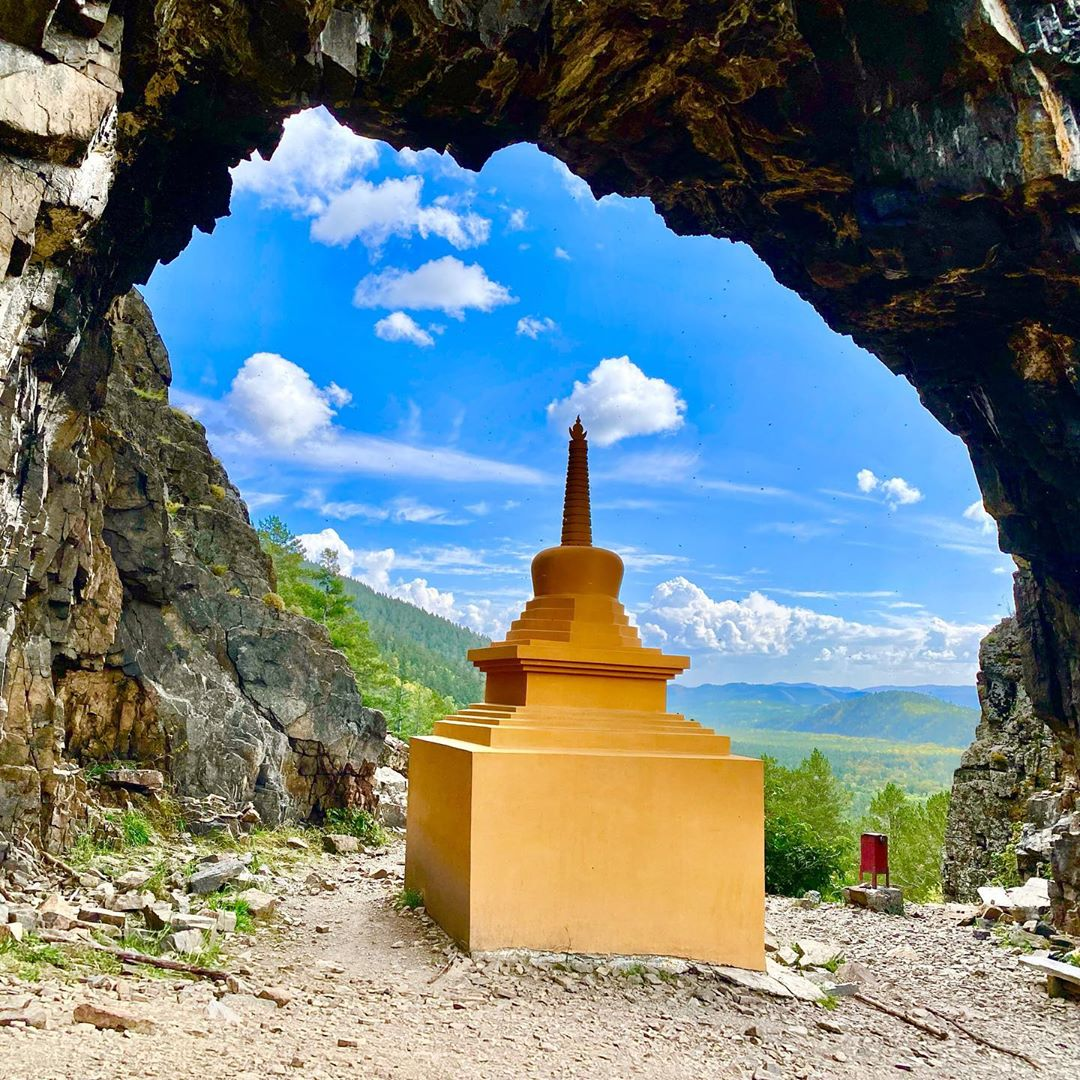
Temple Gate

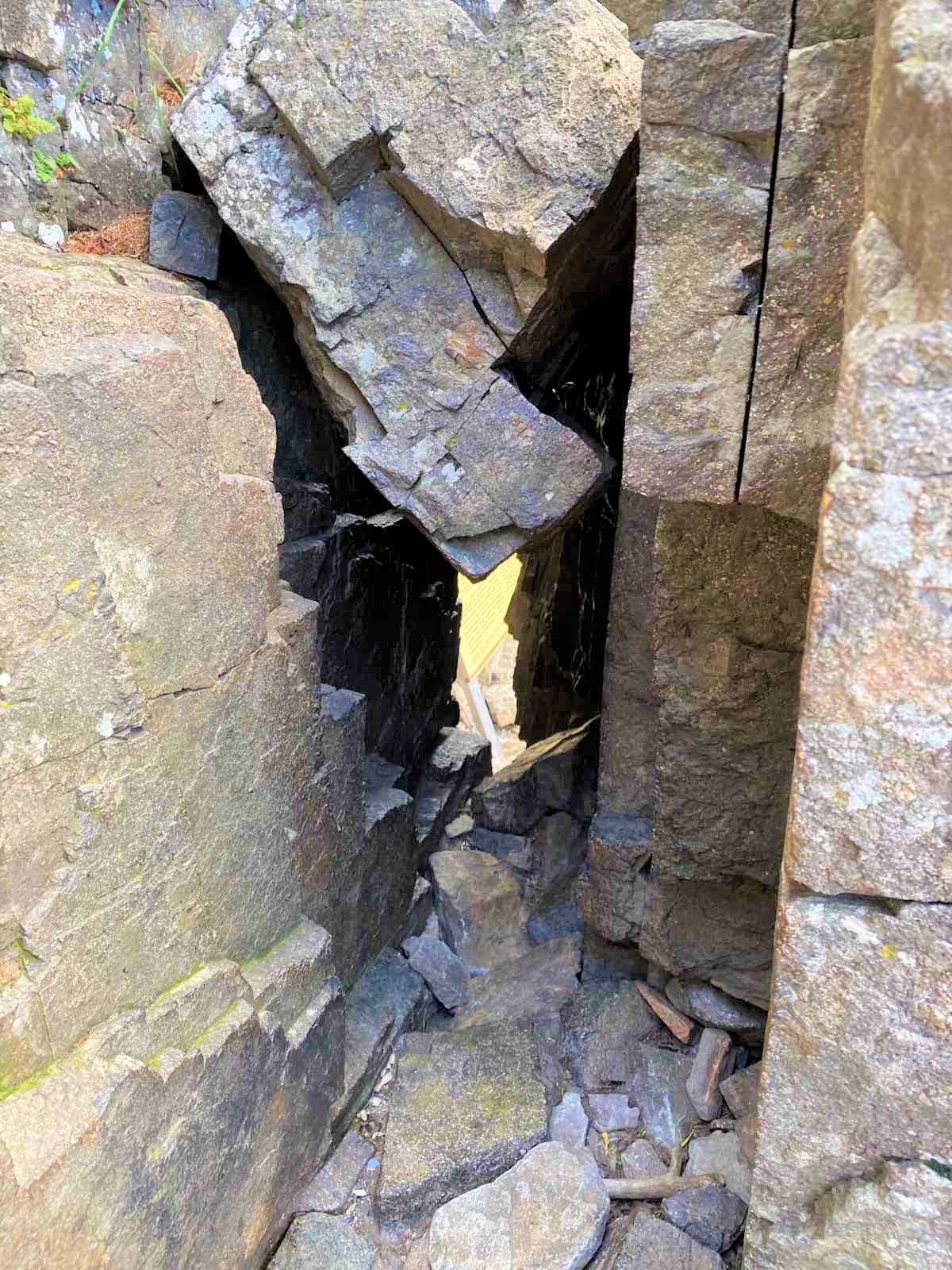
Ritual narrow passage in the rock

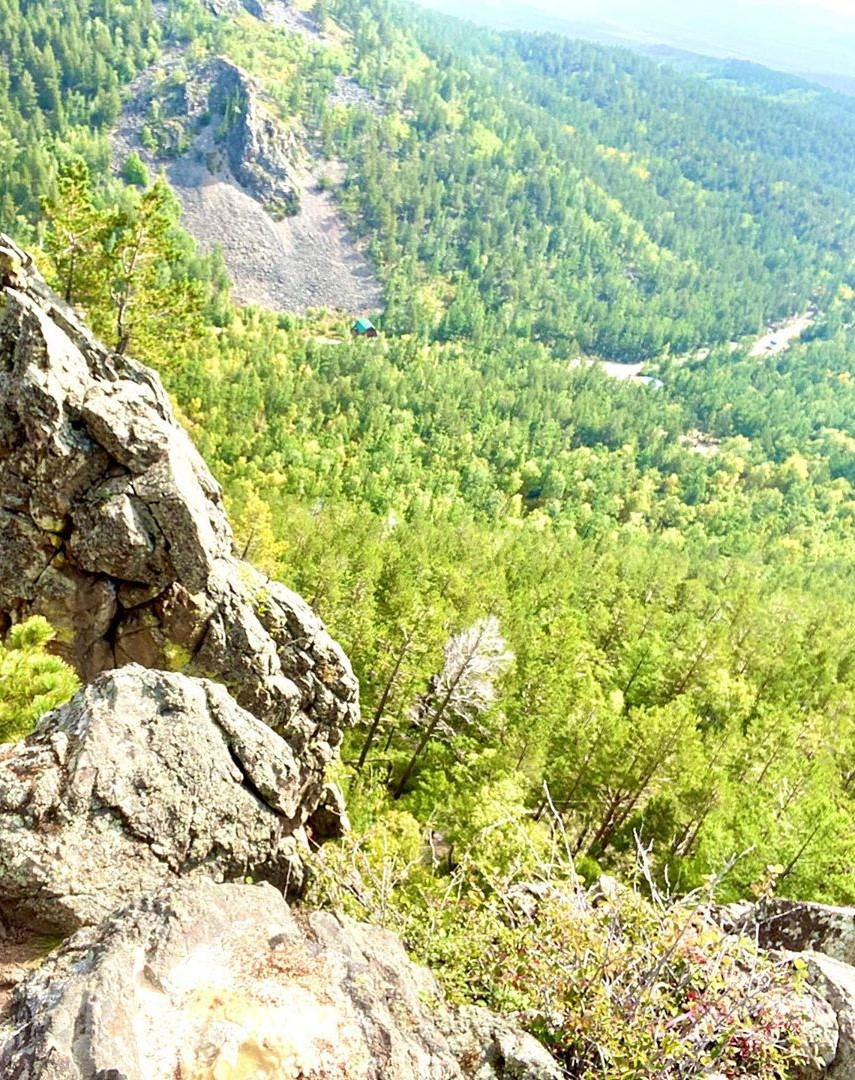
View from Mount Alkhanay

== See also ==
- Protected areas of Russia
- Buryats, local indigenous group
- Chita, Zabaykalsky Krai
