= Daurian forest steppe =

Ecoregion in Mongolia and Siberia

Daurian Forest steppe
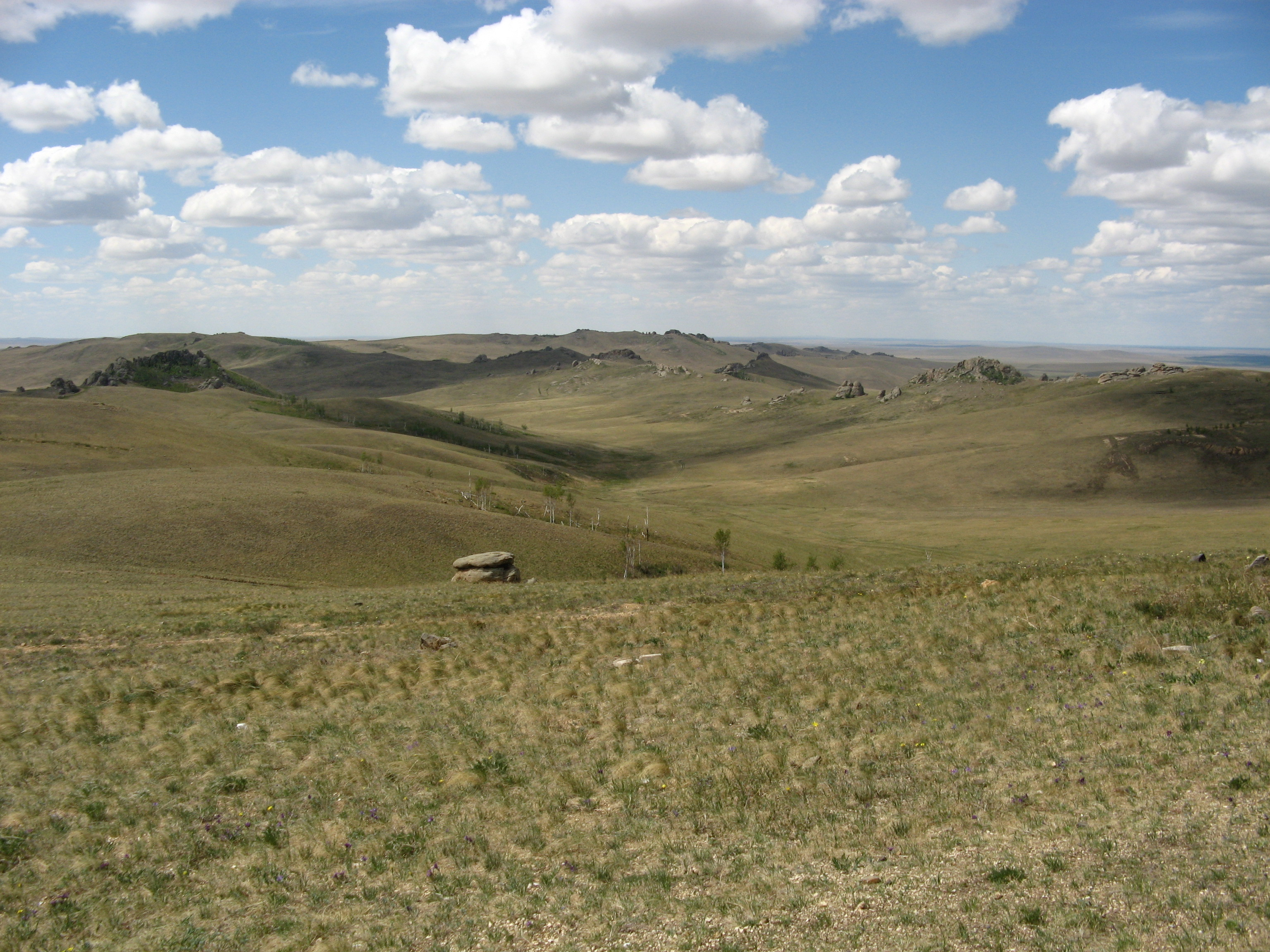
- Daursky Nature Reserve in the ecoregion

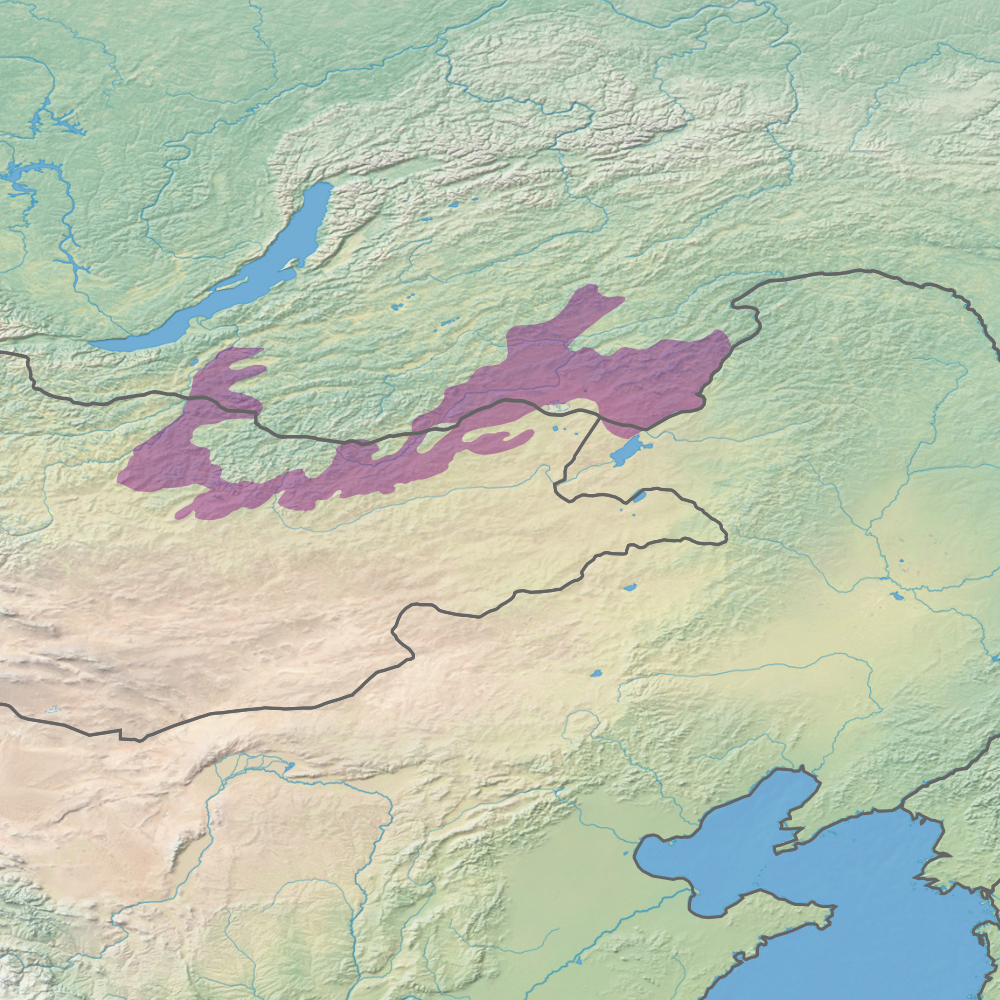
- Ecoregion territory (in purple)

Ecology
- Realm: Palearctic
- Biome: temperate grasslands, savannas, and shrublands

Geography
- Countries: Mongolia; Russia; China

The Daurian forest steppe ecoregion (WWF ID: PA0804) is a band of grassland, shrub terrain, and mixed forests in northeast Mongolia and the region of Siberia, Russia that follows the course of the Onon River and Ulz River, and part of the northwestern China. The region has been described as a "sea of grass that forms the best and most intact example of an undisturbed steppe ecosystem and is also one of the last areas in the Palearctic that still supports stable herds of larger vertebrates" in a semi-mountainous area. The area also has flat wetlands that are important to migratory birds. The ecoregion is in the Palearctic realm, with a dry-winter subarctic climate (Köppen Dwc) that borders on a very cold semi-arid climate (BSk) in its southwestern parts. It covers 209,012 km^{2} (80,700 sq mi).

== Location and description ==
The ecoregion circles around half of the Khentii Mountains, then stretches over 1,000 kilometers east of Ulan Bator into northeastern Mongolia through the semi-arid region south and east of Chita, Zabaykalsky Krai, Russia. A prominent feature is the Onon River flowing east through mid-sized mountains (1,400 - 1,800 meters in height) to the Amur River.

== Climate ==
Because of its altitude, distance from the ocean, and proximity to the cold Siberian High, the ecoregion has a subarctic climate (Köppen climate classification Dwc), bordering on a very cold semi-arid climate (BSk) in the southwest. This indicates a continental climate characterized by short, pleasant summers, and very dry, long and frigid winters, with wide differences between day and night temperatures. Mean temperatures range from −30 °C or −22 °F (January) to 24 °C or 75.2 °F (August). Average annual precipitation is between 250 millimetres or 10 inches in the west and 450 millimetres or 18 inches in the east, with almost all falling in the warmer months between May and September.

Climate at 49.75 N, 112.75 E

Climate chart (precipitation, max. and min. temperature)
J	F	M	A	M	J	J	A	S	O	N	D
0 3 −22	0.1 12 −17	0.2 27 −2	0.5 46 18	1 61 32	2.2 72 45	4 76 52	3.4 72 47	1.5 60 34	0.4 44 18	0.2 21 −3	0.1 6 −17
- █ Average max. and min. temperatures in °F
- █ Precipitation totals in inches
- Source: GlobalSpecies.org
Metric conversion
J	F	M	A	M	J	J	A	S	O	N	D
0 −16 −30	2.5 −11 −27	5.1 −3 −19	13 8 −8	25 16 0	56 22 7	102 24 11	86 22 8	38 16 1	10 7 −8	5.1 −6 −20	2.5 −15 −27
- █ Average max. and min. temperatures in °C
- █ Precipitation totals in mm

== Flora and fauna ==
The steppe lands of the ecoregion are characterized by sedges (genus Carex) and grasses (family Poaceae), forming meadow steppe, herbs steppe and sandy saltmarsh steppe. Along the lake shores are salt-dependent plants and reed beds. The forests of the area are mostly Asian black birch (Betula dahurica), Scots pine (Pinus sylvestris), and Siberian larch (Larix sibirica). European aspen groves are found in some mountain areas.

Herds of Mongolian Gazelle (Procapra gutturosa) roam the grasslands of the region, which is at the northern edge of their territory. The broken terrain of mountains and ravines support small mammals, including the Lesser white-toothed shrew (Crocidura sauveolens), Eurasian harvest mouse (Micromys minutus), and Maximowicz's vole (Microtus maximowiczii). Predators include the wolf, polecat, Eurasian badger, and Pallas's cat (Otocolobus manul).

== Protections ==
The federally protected areas in the region are:

- Alkhanay National Park. An IUCN class II National Park located in the Zabaykalsky Krai region of southern Siberia, covering a forested, mountainous area surrounded by steppe terrain. (Area: 1,382 km^{2}).
- Daursky Nature Reserve. An IUCN class Ia "strict ecological reserve" (a Zapovednik) located on the border of Russia and Mongolia, protecting wetlands and lakes. It is part of a World Heritage Site named "The Landscapes of Dauria". (Area: 84,290 km^{2}).
- Dauria International Protected Area

== See also ==
- List of ecoregions in Russia
- List of ecoregions in Mongolia
- List of ecoregions in China
