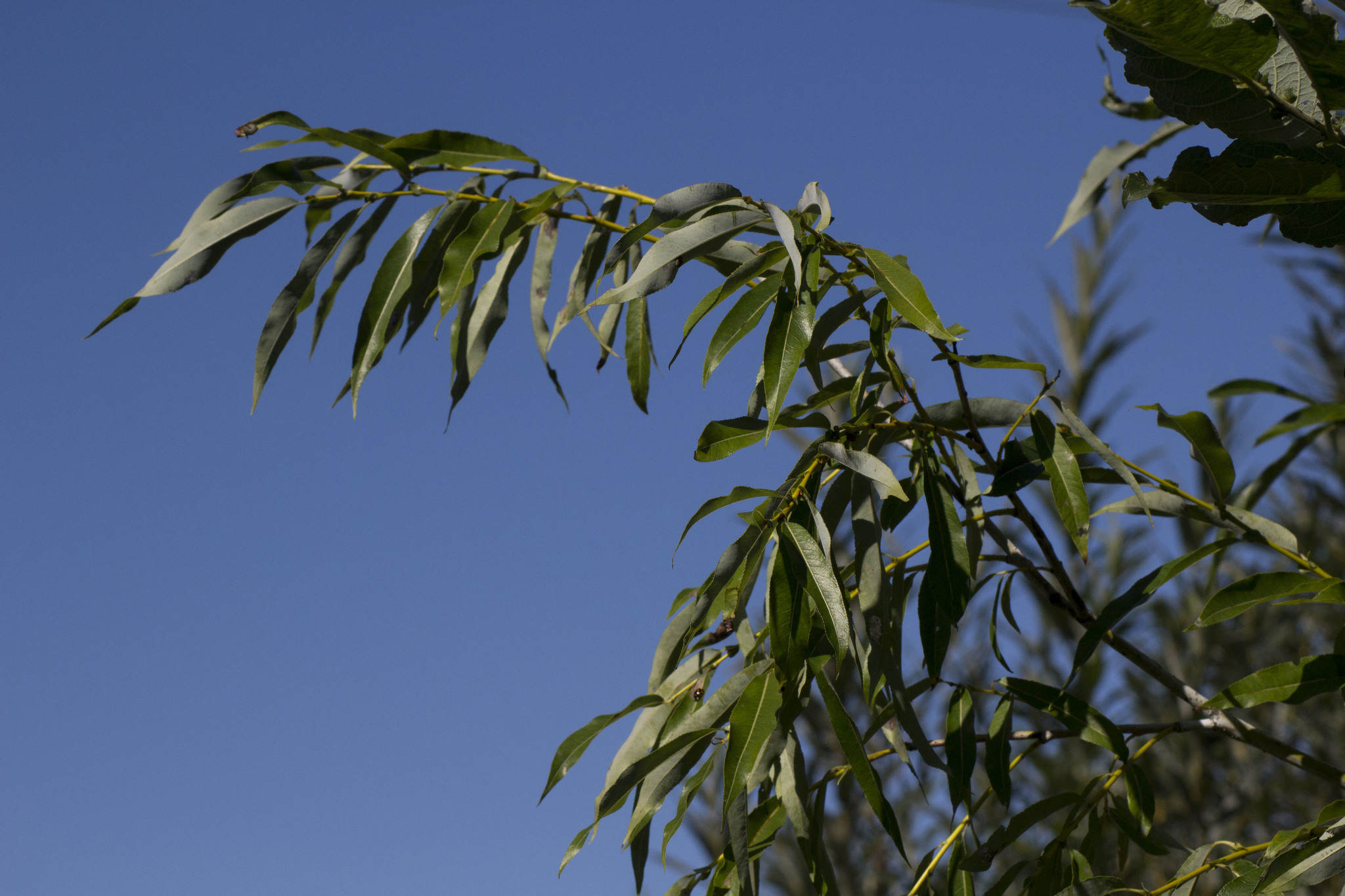

Conservation status
- Least Concern (IUCN 3.1)

Scientific classification
- Kingdom: Plantae
- Clade: Tracheophytes
- Clade: Angiosperms
- Clade: Eudicots
- Clade: Rosids
- Order: Malpighiales
- Family: Salicaceae
- Genus: Salix
- Species: S. rorida

Binomial name
- Salix rorida Lacksch.

= Salix rorida =

Species of willow

Salix rorida is a species of willow native to Japan, northern China, Korea, and the Russian Far East. It is a deciduous tree, reaching a height of 10 m.
