= Daursky Nature Reserve =

Nature reserve in Zabaykalsky Krai, Russia

Coordinates: 49°58′N 115°26′E

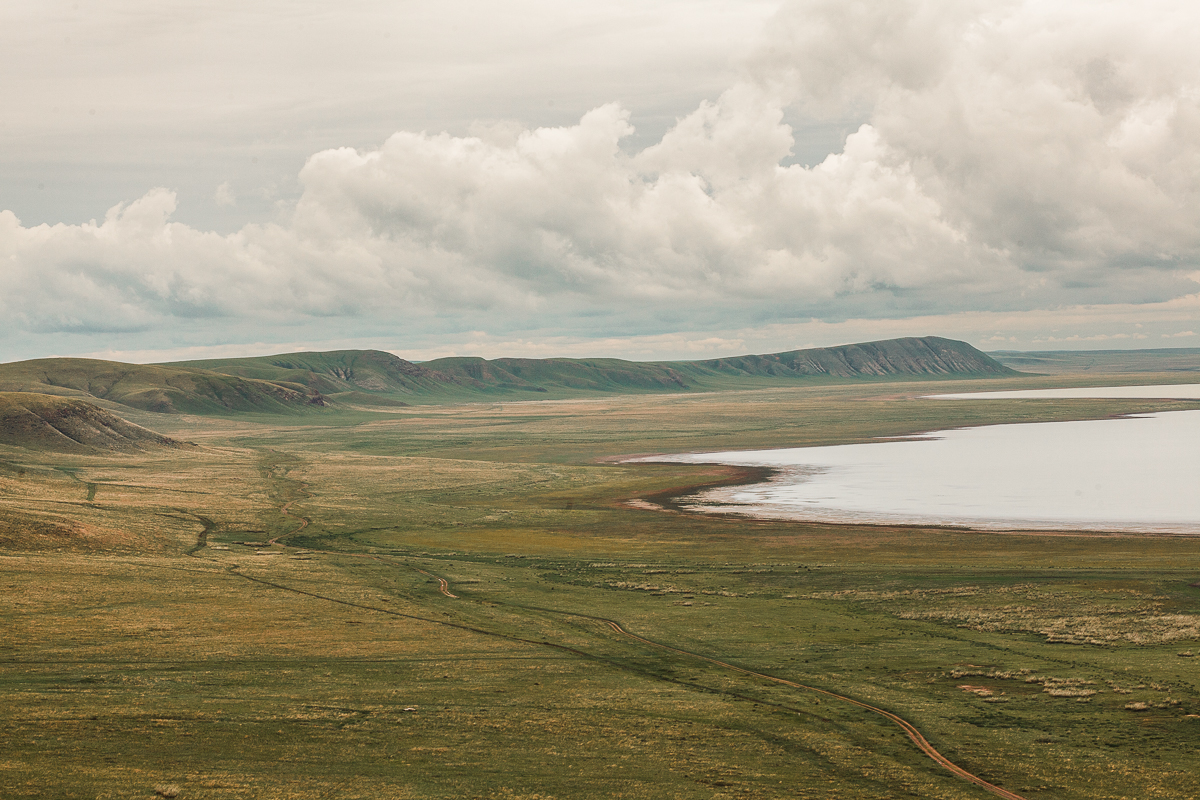
- Lake Zun-Torey
- Location: Zabaykalsky Krai, Russia
- Area: 222,965.00 ha (550,958.5 acres)
- Established: 1987
- World Heritage site: 2017

UNESCO World Heritage Site
- Type: Natural
- Criteria: ix, x
- Designated: 2017 (41st session)
- Part of: Landscapes of Dauria
- Reference no.: 1448

The Daurian Nature Reserve (Russian: Даурский заповедник, romanized: Daurskiy zapovednik) is a Russian zapovednik (strict nature reserve) situated in the southern part of Zabaykalsky Krai in Siberia, Russia, close to the border with Mongolia. It is part of a World Heritage Site named "The Landscapes of Dauria".

The reserve was established in 1987 to protect the dry steppes and wetlands of South Siberia. It is contiguous with the Dornod Mongol Biosphere Reserve in Mongolia, a 8,429,072 hectares (20,828,690 acres) area of steppe immediately to the south.

The reserve comprises 222,965 hectares (550,960 acres), of which about 173,201 hectares (427,990 acres) constitute the buffer zone which surrounds several protected core zones. The core area is of about 49,764 hectares (122,970 acres) and is divided into 9 plots. The buffer zone of the reserve covers the Torey Lakes: two large lakes called Barun-Torey and Zun-Torey.

== Ecoregion and climate ==
The Daurian Reserve is located in the Daurian forest steppe ecoregion, a band of grassland, shrub terrain, and mixed forests in northeast Mongolia and a portion of Siberia, Russia.

The climate at the Daurian Reserve is Subarctic climate, dry winter (Köppen climate classification Subarctic climate(Dwc)). This climate is characterized by mild summers (only 1-3 months above 10 °C (50.0 °F)) and cold winters having monthly precipitation less than one-tenth of the wettest summer month.

== Flora and fauna ==
The vertebrate fauna includes 48 mammal species, 317 bird species, 3 reptile species, 3 amphibian species and 4 species of fish. In addition, there are about 800 species of insects. The reserve also contains 1 colony of the rare Iris potaninii. It had been planned to introduce the Przewalski horse to the reserve in the 1980s, but the plans were cancelled following the collapse of the Soviet Union, although hopes for their implementation were rekindled in 2009. Mammals of the reserve included on the IUCN red list are dzeren, pallas cat and Daurian hedgehog.

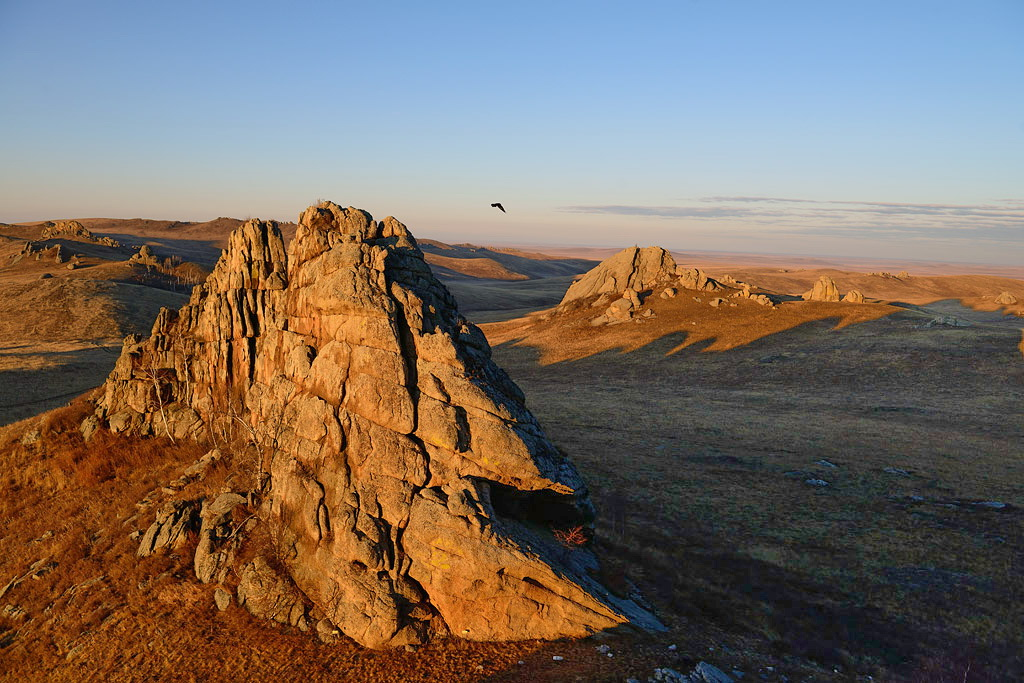
Adun-Chelon Ridge

Recently a new zakaznik, the Dzeren Valley (Долина дзерена), has been created in the area to ensure migration of the dzeren between Russia and Mongolia.

== See also ==
- Dauria International Protected Area
