= Temperate grasslands, savannas, and shrublands =

Terrestrial biome

Extent of temperate grasslands, savannas and shrublands

Temperate grasslands, savannas, and shrublands are terrestrial biomes defined by the World Wide Fund for Nature. The predominant vegetation in these biomes consists of grass and/or shrubs. The climate is temperate and ranges from semi-arid to semi-humid. The habitat type differs from tropical grasslands in the annual temperature regime and the types of species found here.

The habitat type is known as prairie in North America, pampas in South America, veld in Southern Africa and steppe in Asia. Generally speaking, these regions are devoid of trees, except for riparian or gallery forests associated with streams and rivers.

Steppes/shortgrass prairies are short grasslands that occur in semi-arid climates. Tallgrass prairies are tall grasslands in higher rainfall areas. Heaths and pastures are, respectively, low shrublands and grasslands where forest growth is hindered by human activity but not the climate.

Tall grasslands, including the tallgrass prairie of North America, the north-western parts of Eurasian steppe (Ukraine and south of Russia), and the Humid Pampas of Argentina, have moderate rainfall and rich soils which make them ideally suited to agriculture, and tall grassland ecoregions include some of the most productive grain-growing regions in the world. The expanses of grass in North America and Eurasia once sustained migrations of large vertebrates such as bison (Bos bison), saiga (Saiga tatarica), and Tibetan antelopes (Pantholops hodgsoni) and kiang (Equus hemionus). Such phenomena now occur only in isolated pockets, primarily in the Daurian Steppe and Tibetan Plateau.

Temperate savannahs, found in Southern South America, parts of West Asia, South Africa and southern Australia, and parts of the United States, are a mixed grassy woodland ecosystem defined by trees being reasonably widely spaced so that the canopy does not close, much like subtropical and tropical savannahs, albeit lacking a year-round warm climate. In many savannas, tree densities are higher and are more regularly spaced than in forests.

The states of the Eurasian steppes and the North American Great Plains have been largely extirpated through conversion to agriculture. Nonetheless, as many as 300 different plant species may grow on less than three acres of North American tallgrass prairie, which also may support more than 3 million individual insects per acre. The Patagonian Steppe and Grasslands are notable for distinctiveness at the generic and familial levels in various taxa.

== Temperate grasslands, savannas, and shrublands ecoregions ==
Ecoregion	Location(s)
Alai–Western Tian Shan steppe	Kazakhstan, Tajikistan, Uzbekistan
Altai steppe and semi-desert	Kazakhstan
Central Anatolian steppe	Turkey
Daurian forest steppe	China, Mongolia, Russia
Eastern Anatolian montane steppe	Armenia, Azerbaijan, Georgia, Iran, Turkey
Emin Valley steppe	China, Kazakhstan
Faroe Islands boreal grasslands	Faroe Islands, Denmark
Gissaro–Alai open woodlands	Kyrgyzstan, Tajikistan, Uzbekistan
Kazakh forest steppe	Kazakhstan, Russia
Kazakh steppe	Kazakhstan, Russia
Kazakh Uplands	Kazakhstan
Mongolian–Manchurian grassland	China, Mongolia, Russia
Pontic steppe	Kazakhstan, Moldova, Romania, Russia, Ukraine, Bulgaria
Sayan Intermontane steppe	Russia
Selenge–Orkhon forest steppe	Mongolia, Russia
South Siberian forest steppe	Russia
Syrian xeric grasslands and shrublands	Iraq, Jordan, Syria
Tian Shan foothill arid steppe	China, Kazakhstan, Kyrgyzstan

== See also ==
- Oak savanna
- Tussock grass
- Great Plains
