= Landscapes of Dauria =

Place in Russia and Mongolia

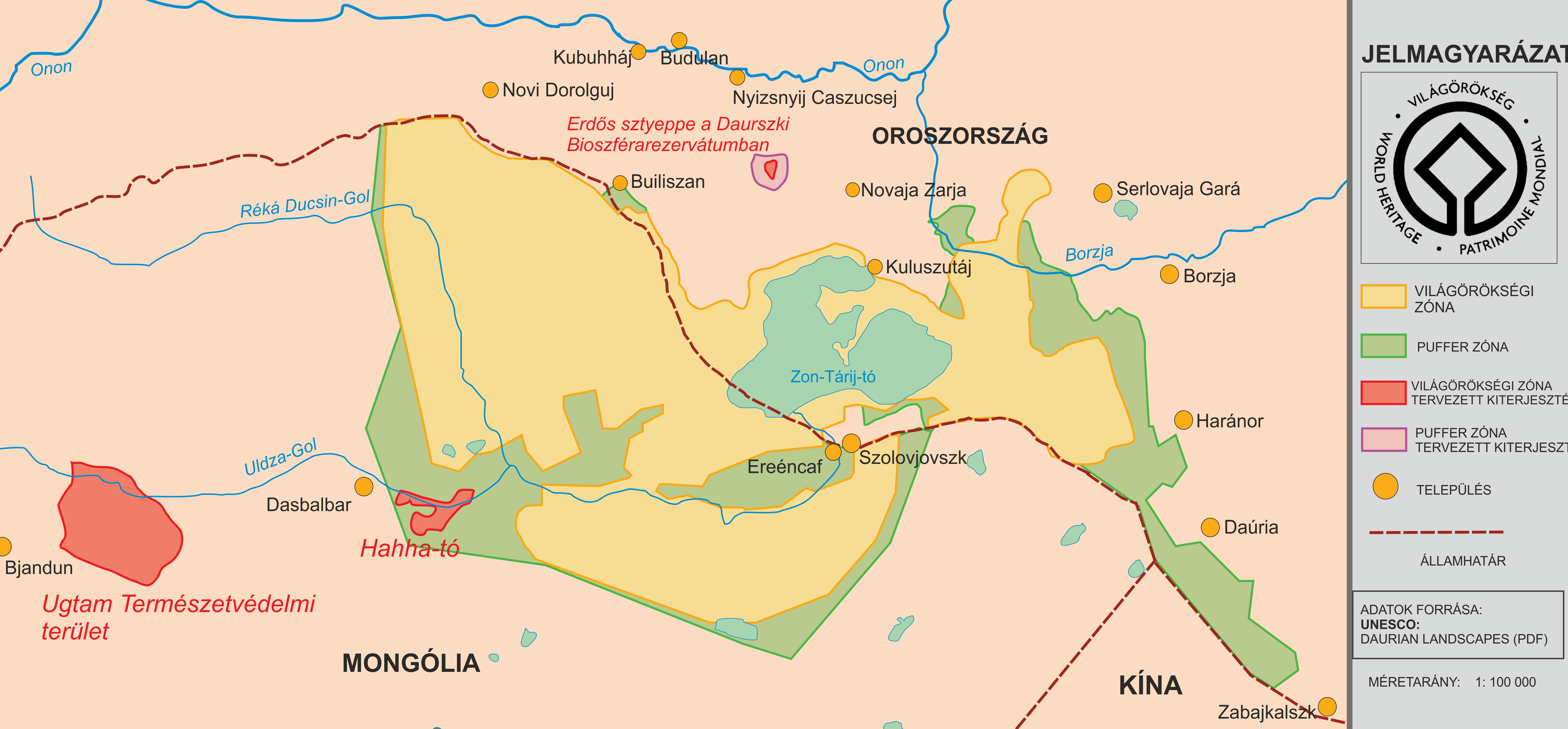
"Landscapes of Dauria" site

The Landscapes of Dauria is a World Heritage Site shared between Russia and Mongolia, part of the Daurian forest steppe ecoregion (the latter also stretches into northeastern China). It is part of the Dauria International Protected Area and includes the Torey Lakes.

== Description ==
The Landscapes of Dauria straddles the border between Russia and Mongolia, occupying an area of 9,126.24 square kilometres (3,523.66 sq mi) in the northern part of the Daurian forest steppe ecosystem. "The Daurian ecoregion is the only one in the world with the complete landscape complex from forest to steppe including lakes, wetlands, river floodplains and mountain parts".

The site encompasses most or all of:

- Daursky State Nature Biosphere Reserve, Russia, 300 ha (740 acres) and a buffer zone of 3,958 ha (9,780 acres)
- Valley of Dzeren Federal Nature Refuge, Russia (Dzeren is the Russian name for the Mongolian gazelle)
- Mongol Daguur Specially Protected Nature Area, Mongolia, 580,080 ha (1,433,400 acres) and a buffer zone of 178,429 ha (440,910 acres)
- Ugtam Nature Refuge, Mongolia, 46,160 ha (114,100 acres)

== Flora and fauna ==
Three floristic regions converge here. It ranges from circumboreal taiga forest to temperate continental grassland on its steppes. The number of higher vascular plant species is 530 in Russia and 349 in Mongolia. There are relict species, such as Kalidium foliatum, Nitraria sibirica and Ephedra dahurica.

The site is within the East Asian–Australasian Flyway, providing breeding and resting places for three million migratory birds in spring and double that in autumn. It boasts large lakes on its steppes for migratory waterfowl.

Sixteen globally threatened bird species have been observed here, including:

- great bustard (endangered)
- saker falcon (endangered)
- swan goose (endangered)
- hooded crane (vulnerable)
- relict gull (vulnerable)
- white-naped crane (vulnerable)

It "also includes key natural habitats for many animal species during their annual migration, some of which also breed in the area," for example the migratory Mongolian gazelle, for which it is the only known Russian breeding area and a wintering ground. Endangered species include the Mongolian marmot.

Mammals include:

- Daurian ground squirrel (Spermophilus dauricus)
- Brandt's vole (Lasiopodomys brandti)
- Daurian hedgehog (Mesechinus dauuricus)
- False zokor (Myospalax aspalax)
- Zabaikalsy hamster (Cricetulus pseudogriseus)
- Pallas's cat.

== Threat status ==
The threat to the Landscapes of Dauria is currently rated low, but there are potential high-risk possibilities. The Mongolian government's Onon River-Ulz River dam project has been suspended pending an environmental impact assessment, while border fences between Russia, Mongolia and China have disrupted the migration patterns of the Mongolian gazelle.
