= Ulz River =

River in Mongolia and Russia

- Mouth location in Mongolia
- Native name: Улз гол (Mongolian)

Location
- Country: Mongolia, Russia
- Aimags: Khentii, Dornod
- Krais of Russia: Zabaykalsky Krai

Physical characteristics
- Source
  - location: Khentii Mountains
  - coordinates: 48.343415°N 111.835535°E
- Mouth: Barun-Torey
  - coordinates: 49.9325°N 115.5519°E

Ulz River (Mongolian: Улз гол, Russian: Улдза, romanized: Uldza) is a river in Mongolia, which partially flows in Transbaikal, Russia, within the Daursky Nature Reserve. It flows into the Barun-Torey (ru:Барун-Торей) lake.

At about 20 km (12 mi) before the mouth, a branch to the right is split named Teliin Gol (телийн гол) (which until 2013 was dry for many years) which delivers water into the river Шуду-Гол (Shudu Gol), which sinks into the lake Khökh Nuur.

== Usage ==
In 2014, around 0.5 million m^{3} (18 million cu ft) of water was withdrawn from the river for livestock and industrial use.
