= Torey Lakes =

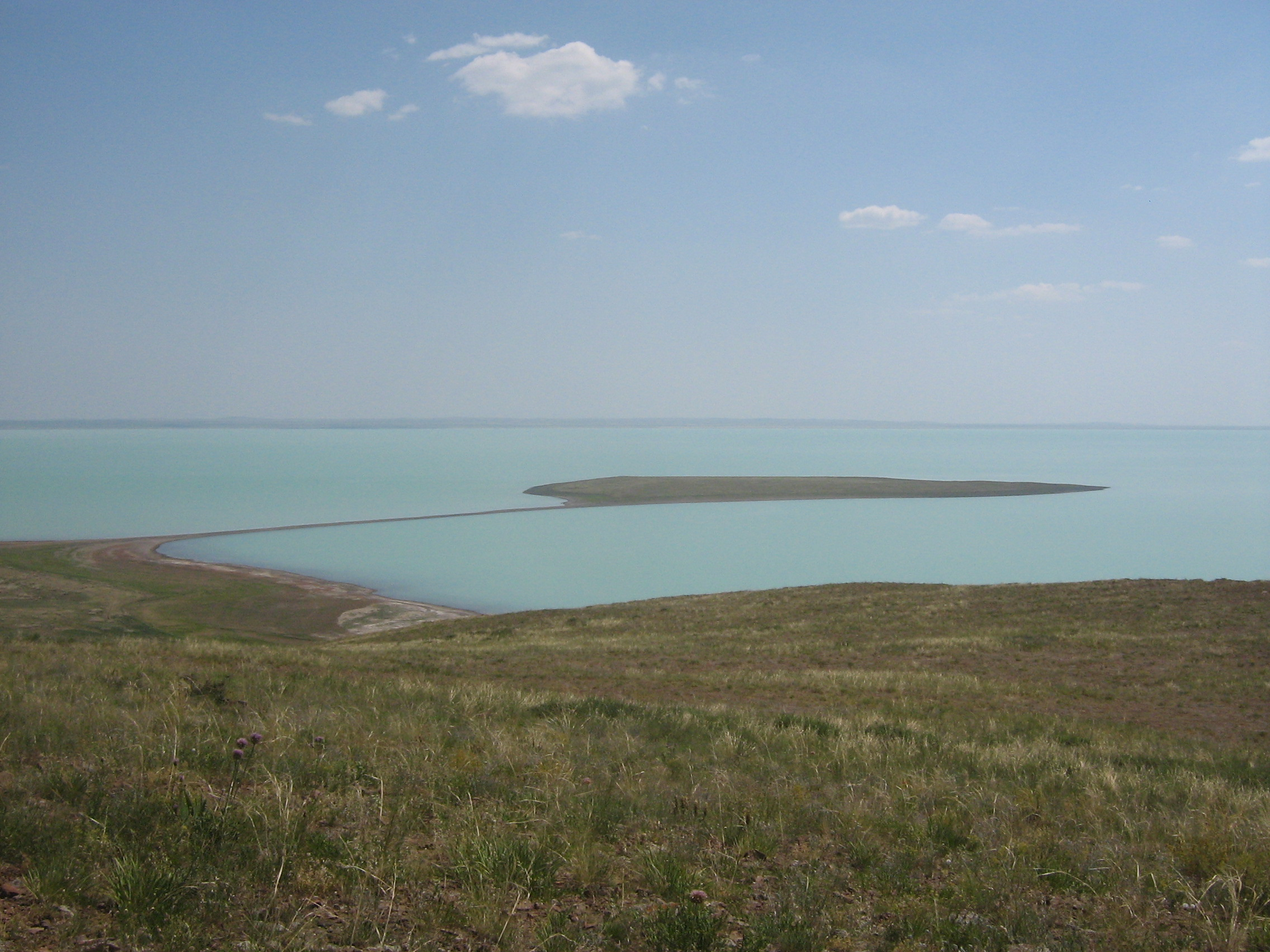
- Lake Zun-Torey

- Location of the Torey Lakes
- Coordinates: 50°04′N 115°31′E
- Type: endorheic soda lakes
- Primary inflows: Ulz River (Uldza), Imalka River
- Catchment area: 26,000 km^{2} (10,000 sq mi)
- Basin countries: Russia, Mongolia
- Designation: Ramsar Site (1994), Biosphere Reserve (1997), World Heritage Site (2017), International Protected Area, Strictly Protected Area, Important Crane Area (1997), Anatidae Network Site (1999)
- Surface elevation: 595 m (1,952 ft)

The Torey Lakes (Barun-Torey and Zun-Torey) are a pair of soda lakes in southeastern Russia's Zabaykalsky Krai, on the border with Mongolia; the Mongolia–Russia border passes through the southern tip of Zun-Torey.

== Geography and hydrography ==
The two lakes are the remains of a large lake or sea whose surface, according to Shamsutdinov (1983), once reached 2,400 km^{2} (930 sq mi) some 700,000 years ago. They are the largest soda lakes in the arid zone (Note: There are many small soda lakes in the surroundings. Afonina & Tashlikova 2020 map some of them: see "Location map of soda lakes in the Uldz Gol-Torey Basin (Transbaikalia, Russia)".) in the trans-Baikal region. They lie close to one another, connected by the Utochi channel, in a closed basin with no outlet to the sea.

The size and volume of water in the lakes varies greatly with the region's multi-decadal rainfall and climate cycles. These interdecadal cycles last from 27 years to 35 years; they depend on variations in atmospheric moistening: relatively moist and very cold periods alternate with dry and relatively warm periods. For example, Barun-Torey lake completely dried up in summer 2009, and started refilling in 2013; Zun-Torey lake dried up in autumn 2017. The dry bed of Barun-Torey lake is strewn with temporary freshwater pools fed by groundwater and precipitations, even though that groundwater is not necessarily freshwater. (Note: In the area that lies beyond the Torey lakes catchment area, there are groundwaters of the Ca-Mg-HCO3, Mg-Ca-HCO3, Mg-Na-HCO3 types, with a pH of 7,4 – 8,3 and salinity up to 1 g/L. Nearer the lakes, Na-HCO3, Na-Mg-HCO3 types of water become predominant and the pH increases from 8 to 8,8. In the lakes' catchment area, groundwater has a higher pH (8.2 – 8.8) and salinity (0.5 – 3.3 g/L). As total dissolved solids (TDS) exceed 2 g/L, Cl^{−} becomes present in significant amounts; and as TDS reach over 3 g/L, SO_{4}^{2-} becomes the main anion.) These pools are alkaline, with a pH around 8.2 – 9.0; they are oligohaline (0.5–1.0 g × l-1), rather warm (26 to 30°С), most are muddy (TR = 0.1–0.3 m). Those at the western shore of the lake are fed by groundwater discharge through a geological fracture.

During periods of high water level, Barun-Torey lake and Zun-Torey lake have the same hydrochemical parameters: oligohaline and alkaline.

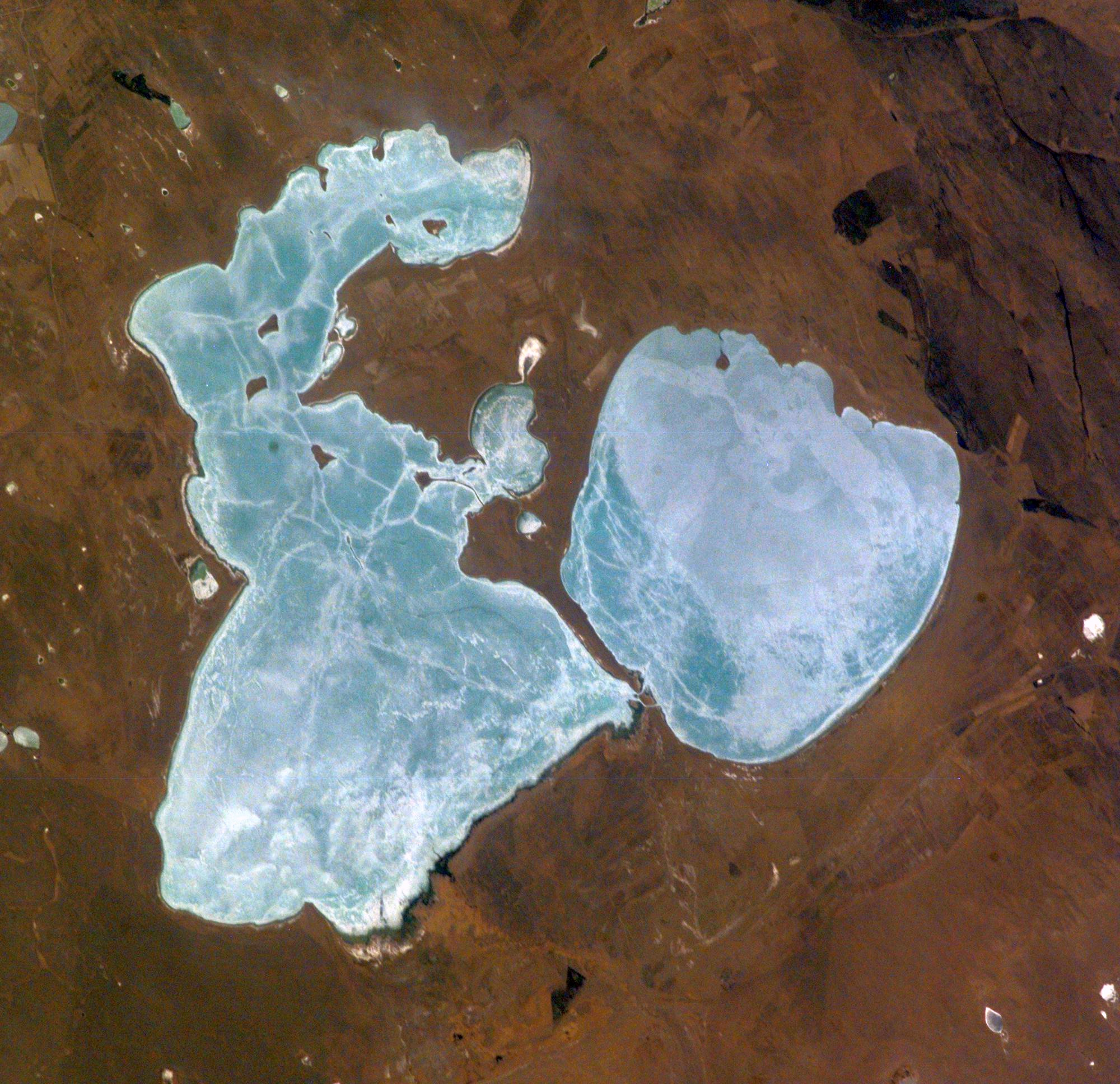
Satellite view: Zun-Torey lake on the right (east), Barun-Torey lake on the left (west). April 2003

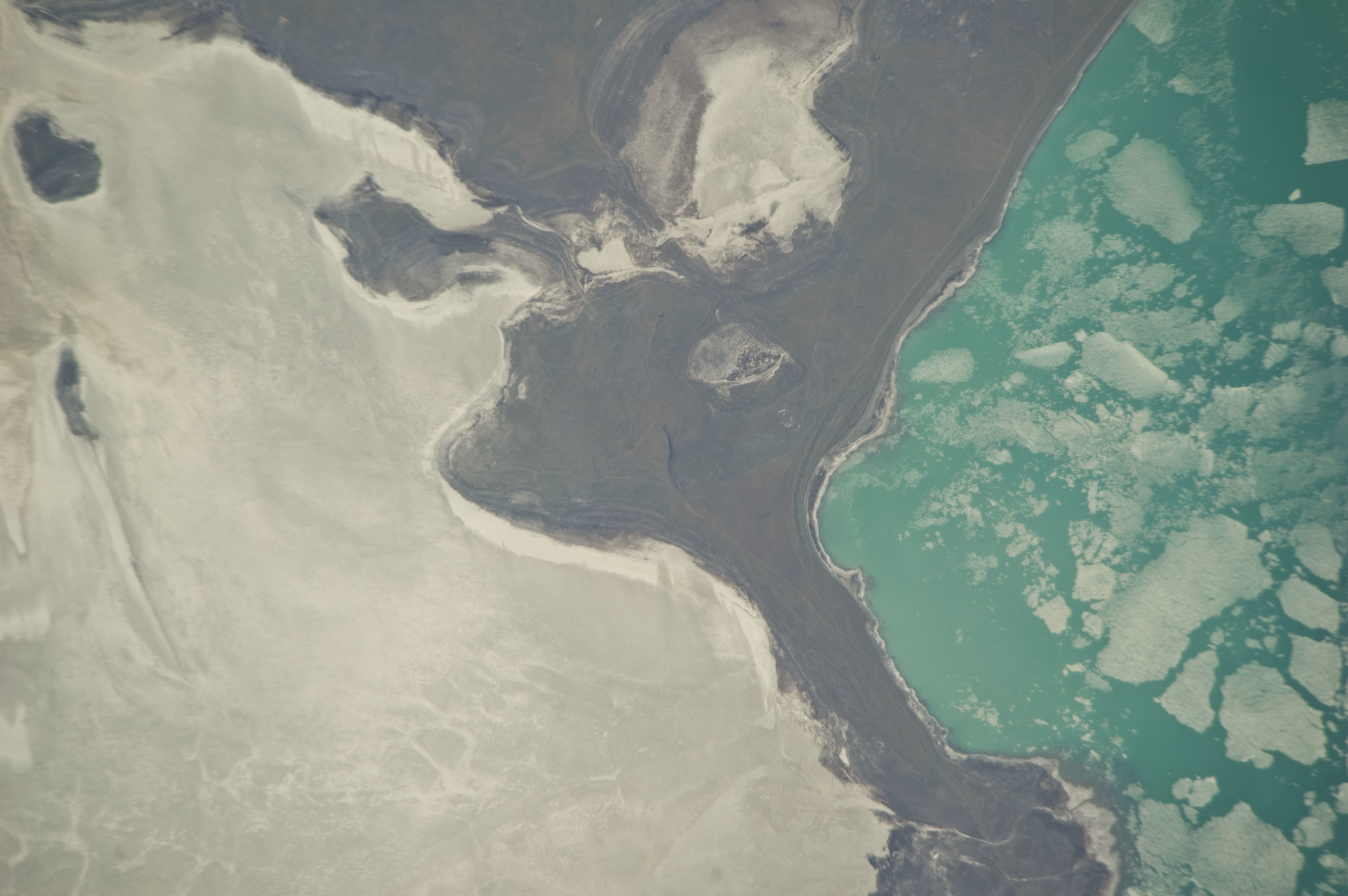
Zun-Torey lake on the right (east), Barun-Torey lake on the left (west). May 2010

=== Barun-Torey ===
During high-water years, Barun-Torey lake has an area of 550 km^{2} (210 sq mi), with a volume of 1.4 km^{3} (0.34 cu mi); the average depth is 2.5 m, with a maximum depth of 4.3 m. In low-water years, the lake shrinks dramatically and can dry up completely. The southern end of the lake extends into Mongolia.

Barun-Torey lake is fed by two rivers. The Ulz River (Uldza River or Ulz Gol) flows into the lake from the south and forms a large estuary. The Imalka River flows into the lake from the west.

When the water level reaches 596.1 m in elevation, Barun-Torey water starts running off into Zun-Torey lake via the Utochi channel. Once the surfaces of the two lakes are levelled up, the wind and other factors induce changes in the direction of the current in the channel. When the water level falls, the shallower Barun-Torey lake dries up quicker and the water in the Utochi channel flows from Zun-Torey lake to Barun-Torey lake. As the lake level falls and during the initial refilling of the lake, three stages of changes in the planktonic associations have been identified; the plankton communities increase in species richness and abundance in the transient pools.

Barun-Torey lake

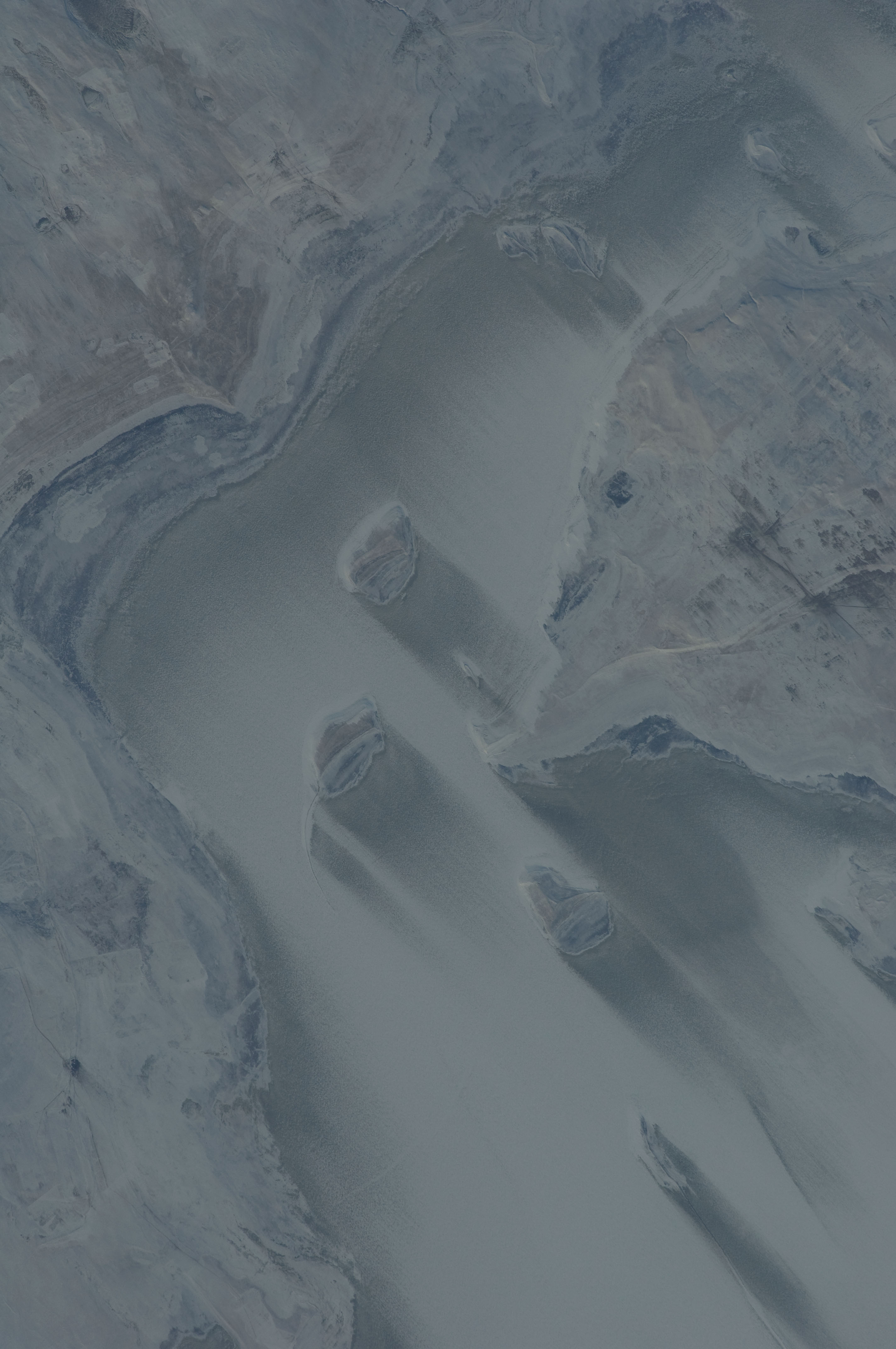
Northern end of the dried-up lake. January 2010

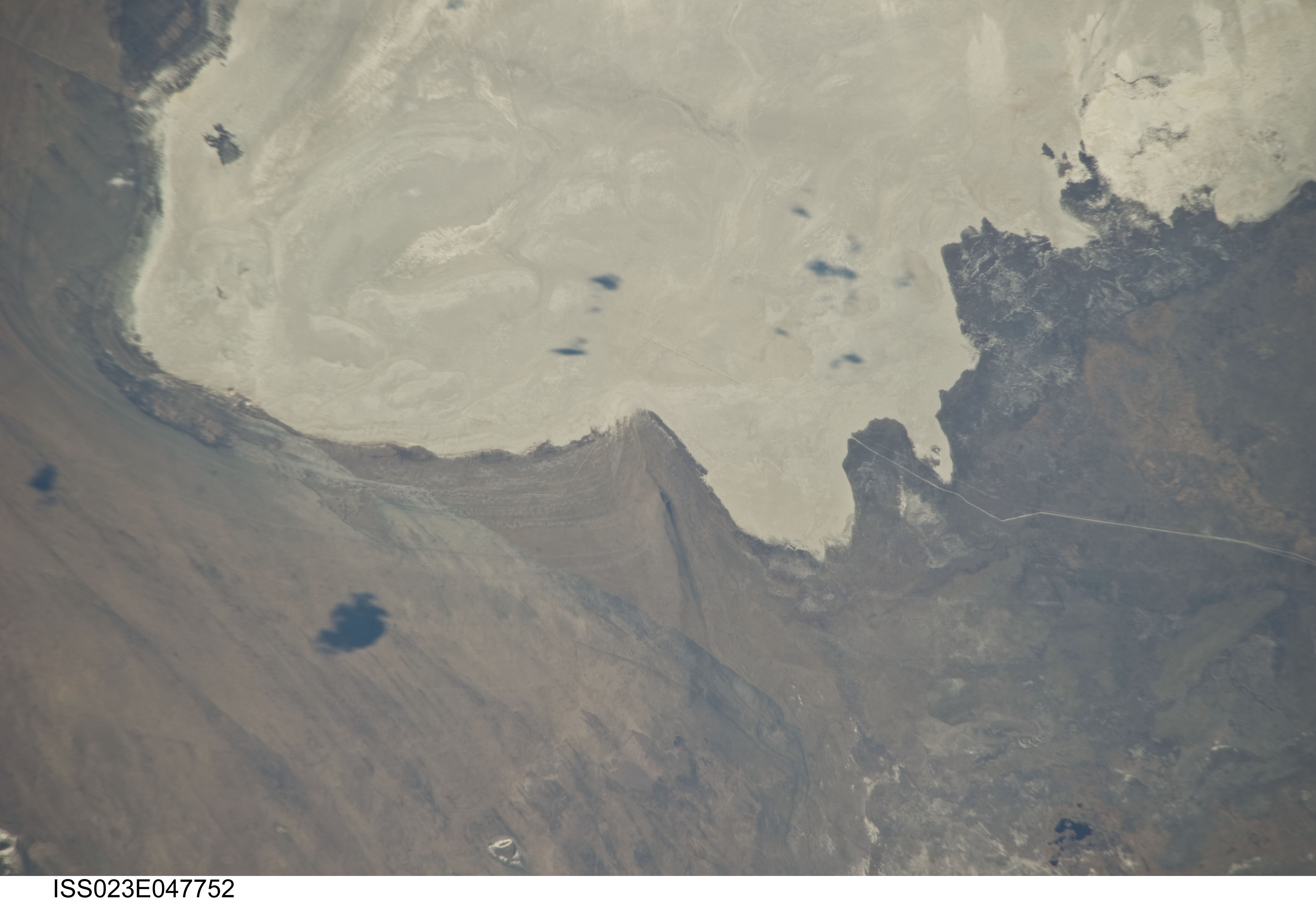
Southern shore of the lake, in Mongolia. May 2010

=== Zun-Torey ===
Lake Zun-Torey lies east of Lake Barun-Torey. During high water, the lake has a surface area of 285 km^{2} and a volume of 1.6 km^{3}; but in 1999 its surface reached 301.6 km^{2} and in 2015 it reached 254 km^{2}. The average depth is 4.5 m, and the maximum depth (in the northern part of the lake, where the lake bed drops steeply from the shore) is 6.7 m; its length is 23 km and its width is 13 km. The lake is round and has a single island, which turns into a peninsula when the water level is low. Lake Zun-Torey is mostly fed by the channel from Lake Baran-Torey, and does not dry as extensively or vary in extent as much as Lake Baran-Torey does.

During the aridification of Zun-Torey lake, four stages of changes in the planktonic associations were identified; the phytoplankton decreased in abundance and biomass, and was dominated by green algae and diatoms; the number of zooplankton species decreased but zooplankton's total abundance and biomass increased as the number of individuals increased in some crustacean species.

Zun-Torey lake

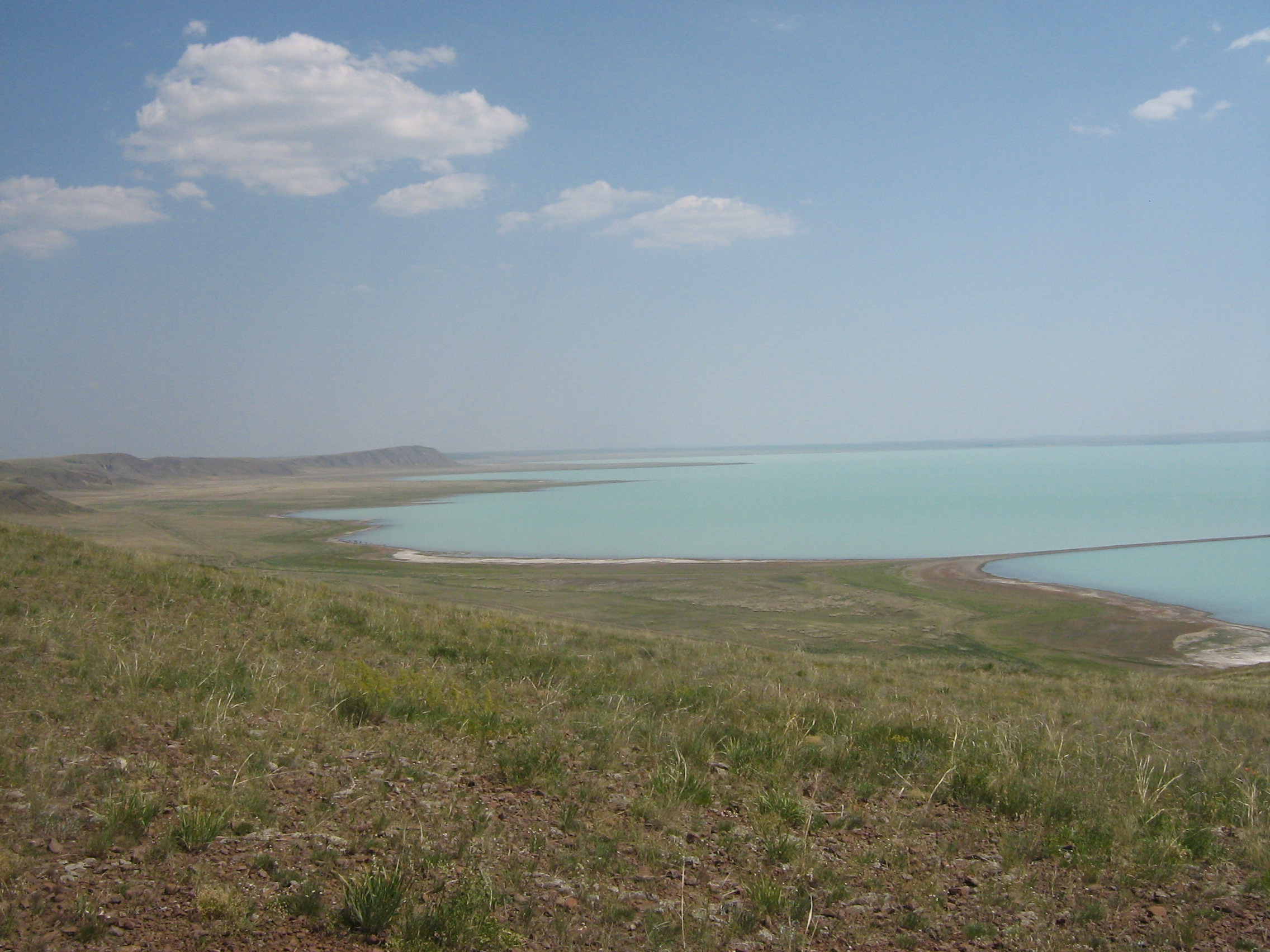
North coast. June 28, 2010

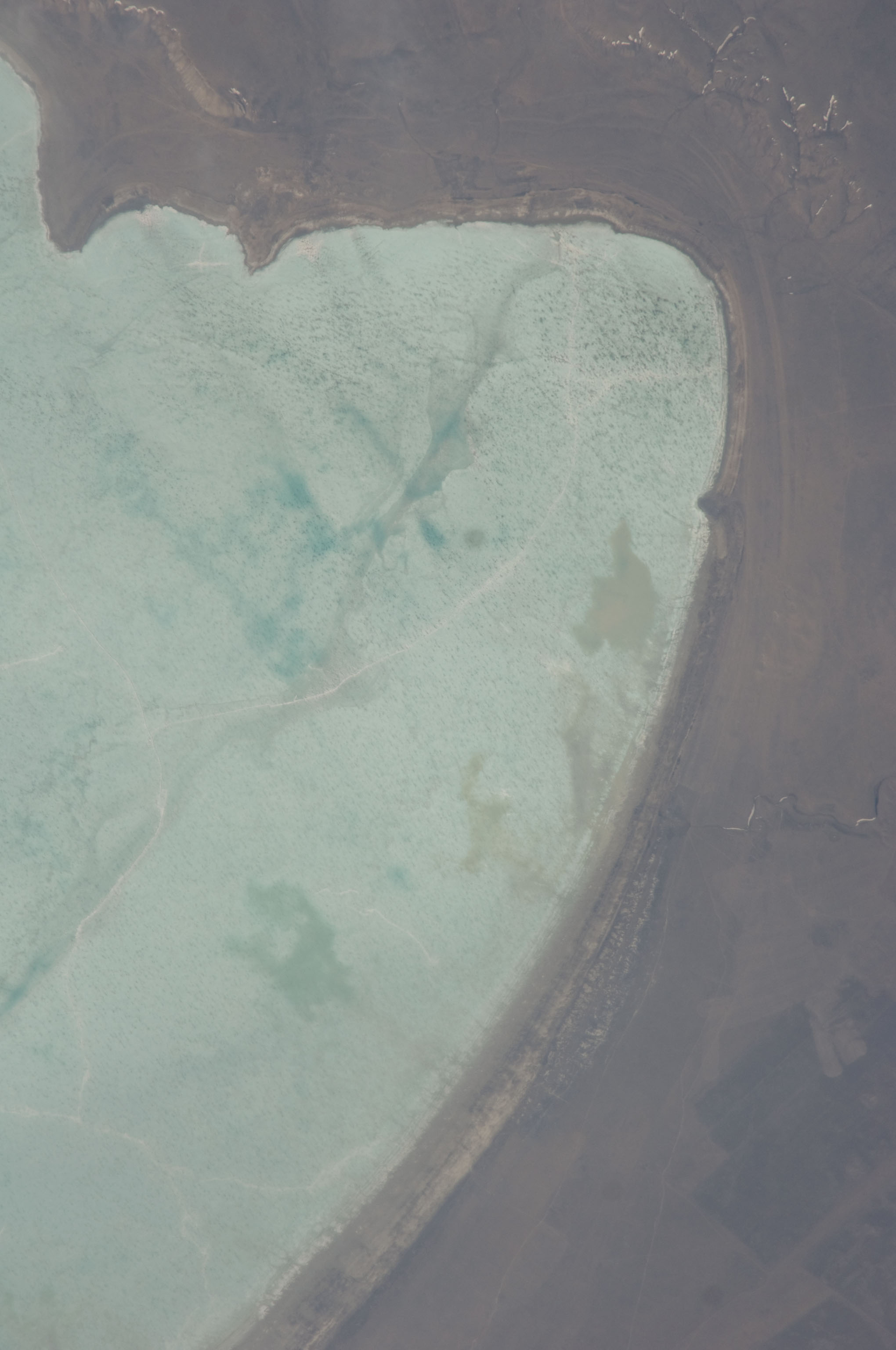
East point of the lake. April 2009

== Ecology ==
The lakes and their environs maintain several hundred botanical species, from herbs and succulents to large trees, which in turn support nearly 600 invertebrate, over 300 bird (including 90 breeding), and many mammal, reptile, amphibian and fish species. The somewhat rare Mongolian gazelle (Procapra gutturosa) inhabits the lands around the lakes, as does the Corsac fox (Vulpes corsac), Daurian pika (Ochotona dauurica), Eurasian grey wolf (Canis lupus), Siberian or eastern roe deer (Capreolus pygargus), Pallas' cat (Otocolobus manul), and Tolai hare (Lepus tolai), amongst other species.

The lakes and surrounding wetlands are an important breeding, feeding and staging area for many species of migratory waterbirds, including several rare and threatened species. The lakes support significant breeding populations of several threatened bird species, including the red-crowned crane (Grus japonensis), white-naped crane (Grus vipio), swan goose (Anser cygnoides), great bustard (Otis tarda), and relict gull (Ichthyaetus relictus). The lakes are located on East Asian–Australasian Flyway, and millions of birds pass through the Torey Lakes and nearby wetlands in spring and autumn. The lakes provide migratory habitat for the critically endangered Siberian crane (Grus leucogeranus) and threatened hooded crane (Grus monacha).

Traditional agriculture, fishing, and animal husbandry are important to the local population.

== Protected areas ==
An area of 172,500 ha (426,000 acres), including both lakes and adjacent wetlands and uplands, was designated a Ramsar Site on September 13, 1994. The RAMSAR site comprises 65% lakes, 22% terrestrial steppe ecosystems, 7% river, 5% arable land, and 1% human settlements and roads; its altitude goes from 591 m to 769 m.

The Daursky Nature Reserve or Zapovednik-Daursky state biosphere reserve was designated a UNESCO Biosphere Reserve in 1997, and covers an area of 2,277 km^{2} (879 sq mi). (Note: The Daursky State Nature Biosphere Reserve (SNBR), together with the Chinese and Mongolian reserves, form an international Protected Area named « Dauria ».) It is also part of the 2017 World Heritage Site "Landscapes of Dauria".

== Threat ==
A 2020 satellite imagery showed Mongolian plans to build a dam on the Uldza River, a venture which would potentially disrupt the natural water cycle and harm the delicate balance of the ecosystem. The UNESCO World Heritage Committee has expressed its concern on the unannounced construction.

== Bibliography ==
- Afonina, Ekaterina Yu; Tashlikova, Natalya A. (2018). "Planktonic Communities in the Torey Lakes (Zabaikalsky Krai) in a Low Water Year". Journal of Siberian Federal University. Biology. 11 (4): 306–320. doi:10.17516/1997-1389-0074.
- Afonina, Ekaterina Yu; Tashlikova, Natalya A. (May 2020). "Fluctuations in plankton community structure of endorheic soda lakes of southeastern Transbaikalia (Russia)". Hydrobiologia. 847 (6): 1383–1398. Bibcode:2020HyBio.847.1383A. doi:10.1007/s10750-020-04207-z.
- Afonina, Ekaterina Yu; Tashlikova, Natalya A. (February 2021). "Torey lakes, Daursky state Nature Biosphere Reserve, Russia: long-term changes in environmental parameters" (PDF). Nature Conservation Research. 6 (2): 42–52. doi:10.24189/ncr.2021.024.
- Drebot, V. (2020). European Association of Geoscientists & Engineers (ed.). "Geochemistry of Soda-Type Groundwater in the Torey Lakes Region (Russia): Differences between Catchment Area and Beyond". EarthDoc (26th European Meeting of Environmental and Engineering Geophysics, held at Near Surface Geoscience, December 7–8, 2020). 2020: 1–5. doi:10.3997/2214-4609.202020025.
