= Dauria International Protected Area =

China-Mongolia-Russia protected area

The Dauria International Protected Area (full official name: China-Mongolia-Russian "Dauria" International Protected Area, CMR DIPA) is the first in Asia three-party reserve created within the historical Dauriya region according to an agreement signed on March 29, 1994.

It includes the Russian and Mongolian protected areas of the Landscapes of Dauria World Heritage Site and the Dalai Lake National Nature Reserve (a.k.a. Hulunhu National Nature Biosphere Reserve (HNNR), Dalainor Biosphere Reserve), China
