= National parks of Russia =

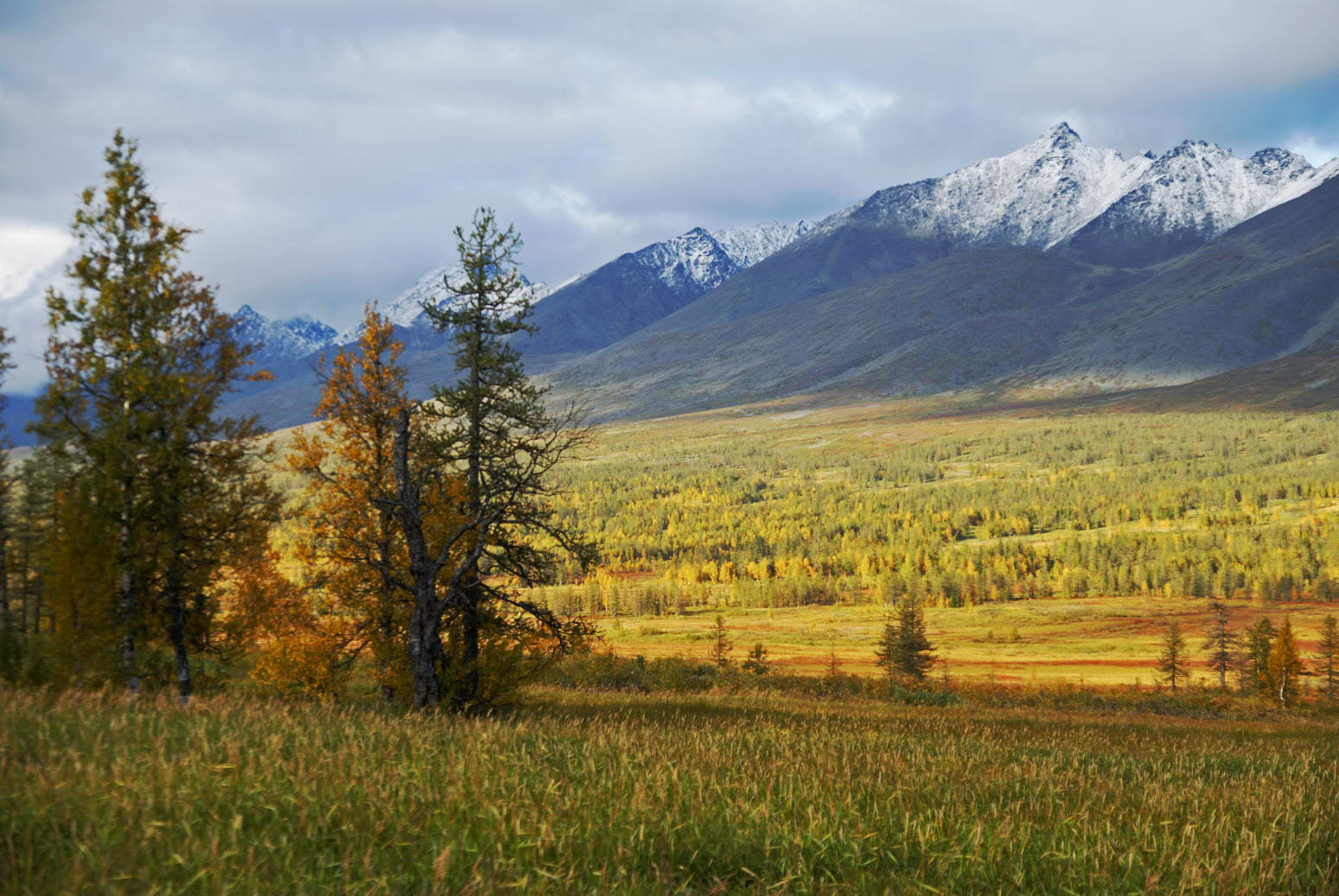
Sablinsky Ridge, Yugyd Va National Park, on the west slope of the Northern Ural Mountains

There are currently 71 national parks in Russia. They cover over 150,000 square kilometers (58,000 sq mi).

== Overview ==
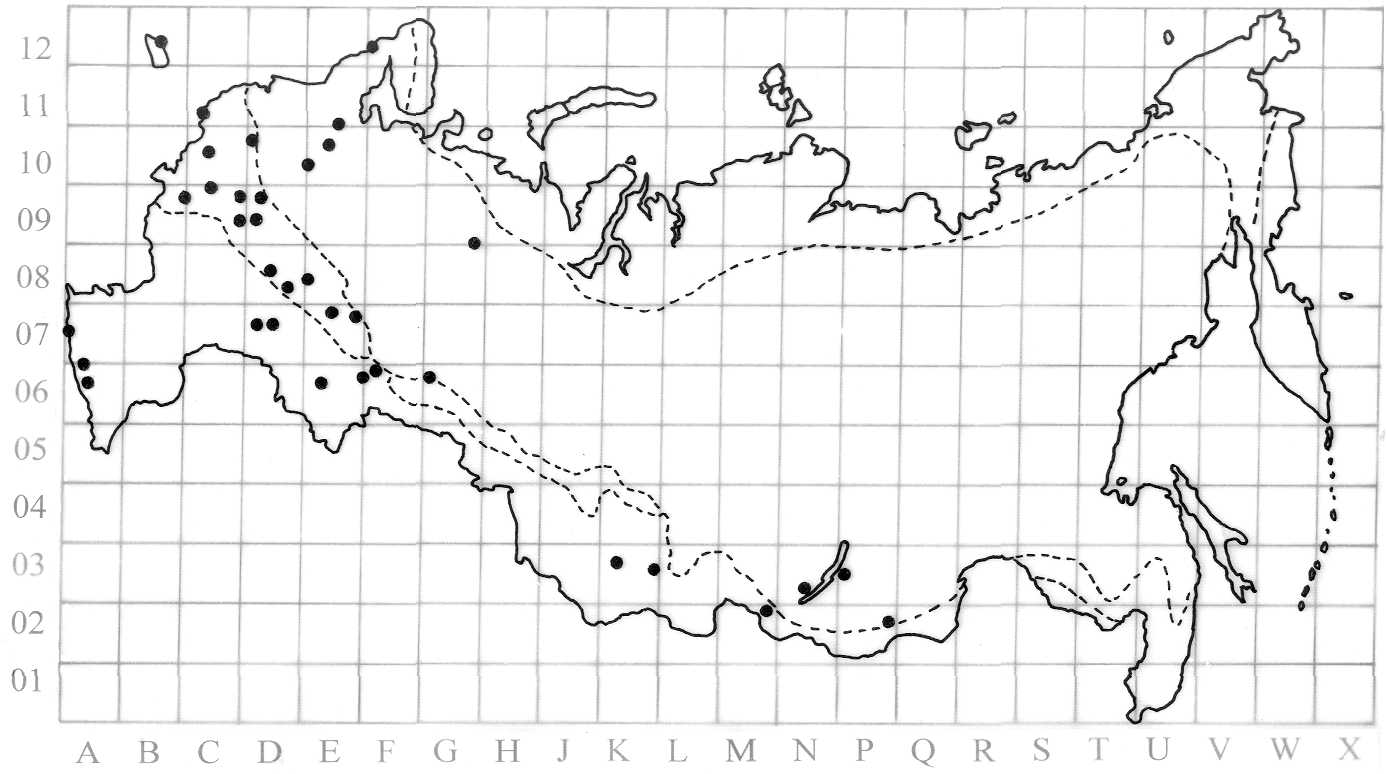
Map of national parks in Russia

Until the 1960s only nature reserves (zapovedniks) and zakazniks existed in the Soviet Union, so international experience in creating a form of protected areas intended for tourists to relax and teach them to take care of nature was very important. In 1961, Soviet geographers, headed by Innokenti Gerasimov, director of the Institute of Geography, USSR Academy of Sciences, visited the United States. This trip was an introduction to the USA experience in environmental protection and Soviet scientists visited the Yellowstone National Park and the Great Smoky Mountains National Park.

After the trip, Innokenti Gerasimov returned to the idea of creating nature parks in the USSR. In 1965 he proposed the creation of a Baikal nature park. A similar natural park was also designed in the Lake Seliger area on the Valdai Hills. In 1966, the newspaper Komsomolskaya Pravda published an article by Innokenti Gerasimov and Vladimir Preobrazhensky, which discussed the need to create a system of natural parks in the USSR. Natural parks were not just thought of as places for tourists to relax, but also as places to protect animals and plants in areas that park tourists would not be allowed to visit without a guide.

The oldest parks in Russia are Sochinsky and Losiny Ostrov (1983); Samarskaya Luka (1984); Mariy Chodra (1985); Bashkiriya, Prielbrusye, Pribaykalsky, and Zabaykalsky (1986).

According to the law on the protected areas of Russia, national parks are areas of land and water devoted to nature protection, ecological education, and scientific research. They contain sites of particular ecological, historical and aesthetic value. Regulated tourism is permitted. The area of each park is divided into zones according to various functions. There should be a strictly protected area managed as a zapovednik, and also recreational and buffer zones in which economic activity is allowed, such as tourism, traditional land use, and benign forms of agriculture and forestry. The strictly protected function is sometimes fulfilled by a neighbouring official zapovednik; for instance, Barguzin Zapovednik adjoins Zabaykalsky National Park on the east side of Lake Baikal. In 2001 Vodlozersky National Park received UNESCO Biosphere Reserve status, followed by Smolenskoye Poozerye and Ugra National Park in 2002, and two others (Valdaysky and Kenozersky) in 2004.

The national parks are currently the responsibility of the Ministry of Natural Resources and Environment (Russia).

== List of national parks of Russia ==
Name	Photo	Location	Created	Park URL	Area	Description
Alaniya	Mountain peak and glacial valley, Alaniya NP	North Ossetia-Alania; 42°52′N 43°44′E	1998	Ала́ния	54,926 hectares (212.1 mi^{2})	Alaniya lies on the north slope of the central Caucasus Mountains. The park includes the 13 km long Karaugom Glacier, the deep forest valley of the Urukh River, and steppe grasslands. Archaeological ruins dot the park, from the Bronze Age Koban culture to the medieval Alan people. The host Republic of North Ossetia-Alania takes its name from the Alans.
Alkhanay	Temple Gate rock formation, Alkhanay NP	Zabaykalsky Krai 50°50′N 113°25′E	1999	Алханай	138,234 hectares (533.7 mi^{2})	Sacred to the indigenous Buryat people, as well as modern Buddhists, Mt. Alkhanai is the central focus of the park. (The Dalai Lama has made two unofficial visits). The surroundings are a prime example of "Daurian forest steppe", in the transition zone between the Siberian taiga to the north, and the Mongolian steppe just to the south.
Anyuysky	Anyuysky NP	Khabarovsk Krai 49°26′N 136°33′E	1999	Анюйский	429,370 hectares (1,657.8 mi^{2})	The park is important because it creates an ecological corridor - from the low floodplain habitat of the Amur River, up through the forested Anyuy River basin, to the high levels of the Sikhote-Alin mountain range in the Russian Far East. The local indigenous people are the Nanai people, traditionally a fishing and hunting culture.
Bashkiriya	Bashkiriya NP	Bashkortostan 53°03′N 56°32′E	1986	Башкирия	92,000 hectares (355.2 mi^{2})	Bashkiriya covers a large contiguous forest and network of dissected river valleys on the southern end of the Ural mountains. The park is a buffer between the industrialized flat lands to the west, and the mountainous and sparsely populated Shulgan-Tash Nature Reserve and Allyn-Solok ("Golden Bee Tree") entomological reserve to the east.
Beringia	Beringia	Chukotka Autonomous Okrug 64°22′N 173°18′E	2013	Берингия	3,053,233 hectares (11,788.6 mi^{2})	Until 11,000 BCE, the Beringia "land bridge" allowed humans to pass between Asia and North America. Russia's Beringia National Park is the western side of what is now the Bering Strait, with the US Bering Land Bridge National Preserve in Alaska on the eastern side.
Bikin	Bikin	Primorsky Krai 46°40′N 136°00′E	2015	Бикин	1,160,500 hectares (4,480.7 mi^{2})	Created Nov. 3, 2015, Bikin National Park protects the largest remaining old-growth mixed forest in the Northern Hemisphere, as well as the territory of 10% of all Amur tigers in the wild. The park also protects the forest culture of the 600 indigenous inhabitants that remain in the Bikin River basin, the Udeghes and Nanai people.
Buzuluksky Bor	A river in the wood	Samara Oblast / Orenburg Oblast 53°00′N 52°7′E	2007	Бузулукский бор	106,000 hectares (409.3 mi^{2})	Buzuluksky Bor is the largest grove of isolated high pine trees in the world. Surrounded by a sea of steppes on the Eastern Russian Plain between the Volga River (west) and the southern Ural Mountains (to the east), the park is the sandy remains of what was once a river delta into the Caspian Sea. There is oil underneath Buzuluksky, adding pressure to the site.
Chersky	Chersky NP	Magadan Oblast64°04′N 149°03′E	2023	Черский	742,717 hectares (2,867.6 mi^{2})	named after Alexander Vladimirovich Andreev (1948–2020)
Chikoy	Chikoy NP	Zabaykalsky Krai 49°46′N 110°18′E	2014	Чикой	666,468 hectares (2,573.2 mi^{2}))	The park is at the headwaters of the Chikoy River, which flows west into the Selenga River and Lake Baikal, 250 miles to the northwest. It is in the transition zone between the Siberian taiga to the north and Mongolian steppe to the south.
Chuvash Forest	Map with borders of Chavash Vermane Bor NP	Chuvashia 54°45′N 47°08′E	1993	Чаваш Вармане	25,200 hectares (97.3 mi^{2})	The Chuvash Forest is a large contiguous (unbroken) forest in the middle Volga River region. The park was created to serve the dual purpose of preserving biological diversity and the protection of a site representative of the Chuvash people.
Crimean	Crimean NP	Crimea 44°40′N 34°21′E	2018	Крымский	34,563 hectares (133.4 mi^{2}))	
Curonian Spit	Kurshskaya Kosa NP	Kaliningrad Oblast55°08′N 20°48′E	1987	Куршская коса	6,621 hectares (25.6 mi^{2})	The Curonian Spit is a 98 km long, thin, curved sand-dune spit that separates the Curonian Lagoon from the Baltic Sea coast. Its southern portion lies within Kaliningrad Oblast, Russia and its northern within southwestern Lithuania. It is a UNESCO World Heritage Site shared by the two countries.
Dyakovsky Forest	Dyakovsky Forest NP	Saratov Oblast50°43′N 46°41′E	2023	Дьяковский лес	18,533 hectares (71.6 mi^{2})	
Gydansky	Gydansky NP	Tyumen Oblast 71°50′N 78°12′E	2019	Гыданский	878,174 hectares (3,390.6 mi^{2})	
Kalevalsky	Kalevalsky NP	Republic of Karelia 64°59′N 30°13′E	2007	Калевальский	74,400 hectares (287.3 mi^{2})	The Kalevalsky pine forest covers one of the last, large old-growth boreal pine forest in Europe. It is situated on the border between Russia and Finland at about the midpoint from south to north. The park is located in the Republic of Karelia. The Kalevala, an epic poem of Finnish and Karelian oral folklore, was drawn from this region.
Kenozersky	Sts Peter and Paul Church in the village ofMorshchikhinskaya	Arkhangelsk Oblast 62°05′N 38°12′E	1991	Кенозерский	139,663 hectares (539.2 mi^{2})	The park has many cultural monuments, one being Porzhensky Pogost, which is St. George church with the bell-tower (both from the 18th century) surrounded by the wooden wall with gates and towers (1789). The park is on the divide between the Atlantic and Arctic basins. Since 2004, the National Park has the status of the UNESCO Biosphere Reserve. It was added to the list of World Heritage sites in 2024.
Khibiny	Khibiny NP	Murmansk Oblast 67°43′N 33°28′E	2018	Хибины	84,804 hectares (327.4 mi^{2})	
Khvalynsky	Pine tree over wooded valley, Khvalynsky NP	Saratov Oblast 53°00′N 52°7′E	1994	Хвалынский	25,524 hectares (98.5 mi^{2})	Khvalynksy NP encompasses a raised plateau of chalk hills of the Volga Uplands, covered in mixed oak-linden and conifer forests, along the west side of the Volga River. It is about 1,000 km north of the Caspian Sea, in Saratov Oblast overlooking the Saratov Reservoir.
Kislovodsk	Kislovodsk National Park	Stavropol Krai 43°53′N 42°45′E	2016	Кисловодский	966 hectares (3.7 mi^{2})	The largest urban park in Europe, Kislovodsk NP stretches from the city center of Kislovodsk up the slopes of the adjacent Dzhinal Ridge. It is located on the foothills north of the Caucasus Mountains. The park supports mineral springs, hiking paths, and a cable car to the top of the ridge.
Kodar	Kodar National Park	Zabaykalsky Krai56°54′N 118°16′E	2018	Кодар	491,700 hectares (1,898.5 mi^{2})	Kodar is located in the Kodar Mountains, about 500 kilometres (310 mi) northeast of Lake Baikal. The park encompasses extreme variations in terrain: precipitous alpine slopes ("Kodar" in the indigenous Evenks language means "steep"), over 570 alpine lakes, low-altitude glaciers, volcanoes, and an isolated small desert surrounded by taiga forest.
Komandorski Islands	Komandorski Islands NP	Kamchatka Krai54°50′N 166°32′E	2022	Командорские острова	3,648,679 hectares (14,087.6 mi^{2})	
Koygorodsky	Koygorodsky National Park	Komi Republic 59°48′N 49°48′E	2019	Койгородский	56,700 hectares (218.9 mi^{2})	Koygorodsky covers one of the largest expanses of virgin southern taiga in Europe. It is located on the eastern edge of the East European Plain, in the Komi Republic of Russia.
Krasnoyarsk Pillars	Krasnoyarsk Stolby National Park	Krasnoyarsk Krai; 55°32′N 92°28′E	2019	Красноярские Столбы	47,154 ha (182.1 sq mi)	Reclassified as a national park in 2019 (from a nature reserve), Stolby is situated on the northwestern spurs of the Eastern Sayan which is contiguous with the Central Siberian Plateau. Area borders upon the major city of Krasnoyarsk from the northeast. Visitors are able to get to the boundary by a city bus.
Kytalyk	Kytalyk National Park	Sakha 70°51′N 147°51′E	2019	Кыталык	1,885,554 hectares (7,280.2 mi^{2})	Kytalyk is a protected area for the Arctic breeding grounds of migratory birds on the East Asian–Australasian Flyway, including a significant portion of sites for the critically endangered Siberian crane. The name "kytalyk" is the Yakut-language word for the Siberian crane. The park is on the low-lying tundra of the delta of the Indigirka River, on the East Siberian Sea in northern Russia.
Ladoga Skerries	Ladoga Skerries National Park	Republic of Karelia 61°36′N 30°50′E	2017	Ладожские шхеры	122,008 hectares (471.1 mi^{2})	Ladoga Skerries is located on the north and northwestern shores of Lake Ladoga in the Russian Republic of Karelia. The park features numerous small rocky islands ("skerries") on narrow bays and channels.
Land of the Leopard	Land of the Leopard NP	Primorsky Krai 43°00′N 131°25′E	2012	Земля леопарда	80,000 hectares (308.9 mi^{2})	The main aim of the park is to preserve and restore the population of the unique spotted cat - the Amur leopard, which number in Russia is now only about 50 individuals. Today, more than half of them lives in the "Land of the Leopard." In addition, there lives and another cat, listed in the Red Book - the Amur tiger.
Lena Pillars	Lenskie Stolby NP	Sakha 61°08′N 127°35′E	2018	Ленские столбы	1,217,941 hectares (4,702.5 mi^{2})	
Losiny Ostrov	Upper Yauza swamp	Moscow Oblast 53°52′N 37°47′E	1983	Лосиный Остров	11,600 hectares (44.8 mi^{2})	Literally, 'Moose Island', Losiny Ostrov is the first national park of Russia. It is located in Moscow and Moscow Oblast and is the third largest forest in a city of comparable size, after Table Mountain National Park (Cape Town) and Pedra Branca State Park (Rio de Janeiro).
Mariy Chodra	The Ilet River, in NP Mariy Chodra	Mari El Republic 56°09′N 48°22′E	1985	Марий Чодра	36,600 hectares (141.3 mi^{2})	Mariy Chodra (literally, "Mari Forest") was created to protect rare plants: more than 115 rare plant species are documented. There are fourteen tourist routes in the park; the most popular attractions being Yalchik, Glukhoye, and Kichiyer Lakes, the rafting on the Ilet and Yushut Rivers, Pugachov's Oak, and the Maple Mountain.
Meshchyora	Wetlands in Meshcheyora NP	Vladimir Oblast 55°34′N 40°15′E	1992	Мещёра	118,900 hectares (459.1 mi^{2})	Meshchyora NP covers extensive wetlands (swamps, peat bogs, rivers and lakes) - an extremely rich habitat for biodiversity - and pine/birch woodlands in the Meshchera Lowlands on the East European Plain in Vladimir Oblast, about 120 km east of Moscow. The area is associated with the medieval Meshchera tribe.
Meshchyorsky	Meshcheyorsky NP	Ryazan Oblast 55°08′N 40°10′E	1992	Мещерский	105,014 hectares (405.5 mi^{2})	"Meshchersky" (Мещёрский) National Park is not to be confused with "Meshchyora" (Мещёра) National Park, which is just to the north, over the border in Vladimir Oblast. The neighboring parks cover similar wetlands (swamps, peat bogs, rivers and lakes) and pine/birch woodlands in the Meshchera Lowlands.
Nechkinsky	Coastline viewed from hill, Nechkinsky NP	Udmurt Republic 56°41′N 53°47′E	1997	Нечкинский	20,753 hectares (80.1 mi^{2})	Nechkinsky NP is an important biological and cultural reserve of Udmurtia (the Udmurt Republic), situated in the middle valley of the Kama River, its tributary the Siva River, and the coastal part of the Votkinsk reservoir. The territory is mostly forest and river floodplains, with a number of ancient archaeological sites on the grounds. It is near the city of Izhevsk, on the west side of the Ural Mountains.
Nizhegorod Povolzhye	Nizhegorod Povolzhye National Park	Nizhny Novgorod Oblast 56°27′N 45°23′E	2024	Нижегородское Поволжье	65,802 hectares (254.1 mi^{2})	The park is named after V. A. Lebedev
Nizhnyaya Kama	Sign at border of Nizhnyaya Kama NP	Tatarstan 55°48′N 52°19′E<	1991	Нижняя Кама	26,587 hectares (102.7 mi^{2})	Literally translated as "Lower Kama National Park", Nizhnyaya Kama is a national park in the center of Russia, located in Tukayevsky and Yelabuzhsky Districts of Tatarstan. It was established April 20, 1991, to protect coniferous (mostly pine) forests at the banks of the Kama River.
Onezhskoye Pomorye	Onezhskoye Pomorye NP	Arkhangelsk Oblast 64°47′N 37°18′E	2013	Онежское Поморье	201,670 hectares (778.7 mi^{2})	The park occupies much of the Onega Peninsula and adjacent parts of the White Sea. There are no all-season means of land transportation to the mainland. Most of the area is covered by forest. Moose, Eurasian brown bear, gray wolf, and red fox are common in the park. Beluga whale occurs in the White sea. In the winter, the sea is frozen.
Orlovskoye Polesye	Orlovskoye Polesye NP	Oryol Oblast 53°28′N 35°3′E	1994	Орловское полесье	77,745 hectares (300.2 mi^{2})	Orlovskoye Polesye is situated in the middle of the Central Russian Upland straddling the Znamensky and Khotynetsky districts of Oryol Oblast. The territory is a hills cut with ravines and gullies. The highest elevation is 250 meters above the sea level. In the low-lying areas there are muskeg with cranberries.
Paanajärvi	Paanajärvi NP	Republic of Karelia 66°29′N 37°18′E	1992	Паанаярви	104,371 hectares (403.0 mi^{2})	Paanajärvi National Park is located in the Karelia Region of northern Europe, along the Finnish–Russian border. It protects 1,043.71 square kilometres (402.98 sq mi) of pristine Scandinavian and Russian Taiga ecoregion forest habitats, lakes, and rivers.
Lake Pleshcheyevo	Pleshcheyevo Ozero NP	Yaroslavl Oblast 56°46′N 38°44′E	1997	Плещеево озеро	23,790 hectares (91.9 mi^{2})	Pleshcheyevo NP covers Lake Pleshcheyevo and surrounding areas. The lake is highly popular for recreational use, as an ecological habitat, and is a former resort for the Russian tsars. The lake is located about 130 km northeast of Moscow, in the basin of the Upper Volga. On the southeast shore is the resort town of Pereslavl-Zalessky, Yaroslavl Oblast.
Pribaikalsky	Shaman Rocks, Pribaikalsky NP	Irkutsk Oblast 51°51′N 104°53′E	1986	Прибайкальский	417,300 hectares (1,611.2 mi^{2})	Pribaikalsky National Park covers the southwest coast of Lake Baikalin southeastern Siberia. The coastal strip includes some mountain ridges to the west as well as offshore islands such as Olkhon Island to the east. It is about 50 km southeast of the city of Irkutsk, Irkutsk Oblast.
Prielbrusye	Prielbrusye NP	Kabardino-Balkaria 43°21′N 42°34′E	1986	Приэльбрусье	1,010,200 hectares (3,900.4 mi^{2})	Prielbrusye is centered on Mt. Elbrus, the highest mountain in Europe at 5,632 meters above sea level. The relative isolation of steep gorges has led to high levels of endemism and biodiversity. The park is in the central Caucusus, just northwest of Alaniya National Park.
Pripyshminskiye Bory	Pripyshminskiye Bory NP	Sverdlovsk Oblast 56°59′N 63°47′E	1993	Припышминские Боры	49,050 hectares (189.4 mi^{2})	Pripyshminskie Bora is located on the western edge of the West Siberian Plain . It protects a complex of pine and birch forests. About 10% of the area is non-forested marshes, ponds, hayfields and pastures.
Russian Arctic	Russian Arctic NP	Arkhangelsk Oblast 75°42′N 60°54′E	1986	Русская Арктика	1,426,000 hectares (5,505.8 mi^{2})	Russian Arctic National Park covers a large and remote area of the Arctic Ocean, the northern part of Novaya Zemlya (Severny Island), and Franz Josef Land.
Russian North	Russky Sever NP	Vologda Oblast 59°57′N 38°34′E	1992	Русский Север	166,400 hectares (642.5 mi^{2})	The park protects natural and cultural landscapes of the Russian North around Kirillo-Belozersky Monastery and Ferapontov Monastery, places of great historical significance.
Salair	Samarskaya Luka NP	Altai Republic 53°30′N 86°24′E	2020	Салаир	161,221 hectares (622.5 mi^{2})	Salair is located on the west slope of the Salair Ridge, which separates Altai Krai (west side) from Kemerovo Oblast (east side). The low mountains are covered with coniferous forest. Because of its warm, humid summers, scientists have referred to Salair as the "rainforest of Siberia".
Samarskaya Luka	Samarskaya Luka NP	Samara Oblast 53°18′N 49°50′E	1984	Самарская Лука	134,000 hectares (517.4 mi^{2})	The park (in English, "Samara Bend") is on the 180-degree bend of the Volga River as it flows south by the City of Samara. It is on the shore of the Kuibyshevskoye water reservoir, and on the north it has a border with Zhigulevsky Zapovednik. Most of the bedrock is karst (limestone) formation.
Samursky	Samar Forest	Dagestan 41°52′N 48°32′E	2019	Самурский	48,273 hectares (186.4 mi^{2})	Samursky is located on the west coast of the Caspian Sea, at the eastern extent of the Greater Caucasus Mountains in Dagestan, Russia. It is divided into two sectors: a coastal floodplain section on the delta of the Samur River, and a mountainous sector that includes Mount Bazardüzü and the southernmost extreme point in Russia.
Saylyugemsky	Saylyugemsky NP	Altai Republic 49°31′N 88°37′E	2010	Сайлюгемский	118,380 hectares (457.1 mi^{2})	Created as a special preserve for the Altai Snow Leopard and the Altai mountain sheep (argali), Saylyugemsky National Park rises in the Altai-Sayan Mountains, on the border between Russia and Mongolia.
Sebezhsky	Sebezhsky NP	Pskov Oblast 56°16′N 28°30′E	1996	Себежский	50,021 hectares (193.1 mi^{2})	Sebezhsky National Park is located in the southwestern part of Sebezhsky District, where the national park is located, is essentially hilly landscape of glacial origin with many lakes. The area is forested, with pine, spruce, mixed, and alder forests.
Sengileev Hills	Sengileevskie Mountains NP	Ulyanovsk Oblast 54°00′N 48°36′E	2017	Сенгилеевские горы	43,697 hectares (168.7 mi^{2})	The park is located in the Sengiley Hills area of the Volga Uplands, along the middle Volga River in Russia. The 'mountains' are technically plateau with deep ravines and river cuts, about three-quarters forested.
Shantar Islands	Shantar Islands NP	Khabarovsk Krai 55°00′N 137°30′E	2014	Шантарские острова	250,000 hectares (965.3 mi^{2})	The Shantar Islands are a group of 15 islands that lie off the coast of Khabarovsk Krai, in the Sea of Okhotsk. Most of the islands have rugged cliffs, and the highest point is 720 meters. They are home to Steller Sea Lions, seals, and Bowhead whales.
Shorsky	Shorsky NP	Kemerovo Oblast 52°35′N 88°20′E	1989	Шорский	418,000 hectares (1,613.9 mi^{2})	Shorsky National Park is a forested, mountainous area in southwestern Siberia, where the West Siberian Plain meets the South Siberian Mountains . It is representative of areas with dark taiga tree cover (92% of the park is forested).
Shushensky Bor	Shushensky Bor NP	Krasnoyarsk Krai 52°42′N 91°30′E	1995	Шушенский бор	39,180 hectares (151.3 mi^{2})	
Smolenskoye Poozerye	Smolenskoye Poozerye NP	Smolensk Oblast 55°32′N 31°24′E	1992	Смоленское Поозерье	146,237 hectares (564.6 mi^{2})	"Smolensk Lakes" is a forest-wetland ecosystem of 35 lakes and surroundings in the northwest of Smolensk Oblast near the Russian border with Belarus. It is in the basin of the Daugava (river) (also called the "Western Dvina" River), about 40 miles (64 km) north of the city of Smolensk.
Smolny	Smolny NP	Republic of Mordovia 54°50′N 45°40′E	1995	Смольный	36,500 hectares (140.9 mi^{2})	The park has a representative lowland river environment, with a slow current. The lakes and swamps are mainly concentrated in the floodplain of the Alatyr River. Marshes are mainly lowland. A few bogs are located in the southern and central parts of the park. There are many springs.
Sochi	Sochi NP	Krasnodar Krai 43°05′N 39°43′E	1983	Сочинский	193,737 hectares (748.0 mi^{2})	The park occupies the Greater Sochi area, from the border with the Tuapsinsky District, between the mouths of Shepsi River and Magri River in the north-west, to the border with Abkhazia along the Psou River in the south-east, and between the Black Sea to the water divide crest of the Greater Caucasus.
Taganay	Taganay NP	Chelyabinsk Oblast 55°15′N 59°47′E	1991	Таганай	56,800 hectares (219.3 mi^{2})	Taganay is a group of mountain ridges in the Southern Urals, on the territory of Chelyabinsk Oblast, with the highest point rising 1178 m. above sea level.
Teberdinsky	Teberdinsky NP	Karachay-Cherkessia43°21′N 41°42′E	2021	Тебердинский	112,607 hectares (434.8 mi^{2})	
Tokinsko-Stanovoy	Tokinsko-Stanovoy NP	Amur Oblast 50°41′N 130°09′E	2019	Токинско-Становой	243,000 hectares (938.2 mi^{2})	Tokinsko-Stanovoy is located at the mountainous headwaters of the Zeya River, in the Stanovoy Highlands of the Russian Far East. It was created in 2019 to protect important natural features - particularly the Siberian snow sheep, and also the cultural heritage of the reindeer-herding indigenous Evenki people.
Tula Zaseki	Tula Zaseki NP	Tula Oblast54°17′N 38°04′E	2023	Тульские засеки	5,787 hectares (22.3 mi^{2})	
Tunkinsky	Tunkinsky NP	Buryatia 51°41′N 102°08′E	1991	Тункинский	1,183,662 hectares (4,570.1 mi^{2})	Tunkinsky is in south central Siberia, and covers a mountainous region centered on the Irkut River valley (also referred to as the Tunka Valley) that continues from the rift valley of Lake Baikalsouthwest to the border of Mongolia. To the north and west of the valley is the eastern edge of the Sayan Mountains.
Udegeyskaya Legenda	Udegeyskaya Legenda NP	Primorsky Krai 45°49′N 135°25′E	1991	Удэгейская легенда	103,744 hectares (400.6 mi^{2})	Udege Legend covers the richest coniferous-deciduous forest on the western slope of the Central Sikhote-Alin mountains of the Russian Far East. The park is designed to protect west-slope river valley habitat, and to support the remnant of the indigenous Udege people. The area is known for abundant fishing and boating on the streams and rivers. It is also a refuge for the endangered Amur Tiger.
Ugra	Ugra NP	Kaluga Oblast 54°09′N 35°52′E	1997	Угра	98,600 hectares (380.7 mi^{2})	Ugra National Park is a forested area in the Kaluga region (southwest of Moscow) and includes the valleys of the rivers Ugra, Zhizdra, Vyssa and Oka. The park's highlights include the Optina Monastery and the Nikola-Lenivets art park.
Valdaysky	Valdaysky NP	Novgorod Oblast 57°59′N 31°15′E	1990	Валдайский	158,500 hectares (612.0 mi^{2})	Since 2004, the National Park has the status of a UNESCO Biosphere Reserve. Valdaysky National Park, which includes the town of Valday, Lake Valdayskoye, and the northern part of Lake Seliger, is one of the most popular tourist destinations in Central Russia and has well-developed tourist infrastructure.
Vodlozersky	Vodlozersky NP	Arkhangelsk Oblast 62°39′N 37°05′E	1991	Водлозерский	428,000 hectares (1,652.5 mi^{2})	The park area includes Lake Vodlozero, the river basin of the Ileksa, the main inflow of the lake, and the upper course of the Vodla. In 2001, Vodlozersky was designated a UNESCO Biodiversity Reserve site.
Vottovaara	Vottovaara NP	Republic of Karelia 63°04′N 32°37′E	2023	Воттоваара	14,059 hectares (54.3 mi^{2})	
Yugyd Va	Yugyd Va NP	Komi Republic 62°25′N 58°47′E	1994	Югыд ва	1,891,700 hectares (7,303.9 mi^{2})	The Yugyd Va park covers a territory in the Northern Ural Mountains and adjacent foothills and flatlands. The entire park is within the Pechora River basin, i.e. west of the Europe-Asia continental divide; this means that all of it is geographically in Europe.
Zabaykalsky	Zabaykalsky NP	Buryat Republic 53°43′N 109°13′E	1986	Забайкальский	269,000 hectares (1,038.6 mi^{2})	Zaybaykalsky National Park covers a section of the eastern shore of Lake Baikal.
Zavidovo	Zavidovo NP	Tver Oblast 56°25′N 36°07′E	2015	Завидово	132,858 hectares (513.0 mi^{2})	Zavidovo is a complex of forests and wetlands located in Tver Oblast and Moscow Oblast, Russia. The area is abundant in game animals and has historically been a notable hunting reserve for government officials.
Zigalga	Zigalga NP	Chelyabinsk Oblast 54°35′N 58°31′E	2019	Зигальга	45,662 hectares (176.3 mi^{2})	Zigalga is located on the high Zigalga Ridge of the Southern Ural Mountains in Russia, on the transition between Europe and Siberia.
Zov Tigra	Zov Tigra NP	Primorsky Krai 43°35′N 134°16′E	2007	Зов Тигра	83,384 hectares (321.9 mi^{2})	Zov Tigra is a mountainous refuge for the endangered Amur Tiger. The park encompasses an area of 83,384 hectares (206,046 acres; 834 km2; 322 sq mi) on the far southeast coast of Russia's Far East in the federal district Primorsky Krai (in English, "Maritime Region").
Zyuratkul	Zyuratkul NP	Chelyabinsk Oblast 54°51′N 58°56′E	1993	Зюраткуль	88,200 hectares (340.5 mi^{2})	Notable features include Lake Zyuratkul, a rare mountainous body of water for the Urals 754 m above sea level, with a surface area of 13,2 km2 and a maximum depth of 8 m. Water is slightly mineralised (≈50 mg/L). Because of its clear water and spectacular landscape around, Zyuratkul' is often called "Ural Ritsa".

== See also ==
- Protected areas of Russia
- Nature Reserves (Zapovedniks) of Russia
