= Kodar National Park =

National park in Russia

- (Russian: национальный парк Кодар)
- IUCN category II (national park)
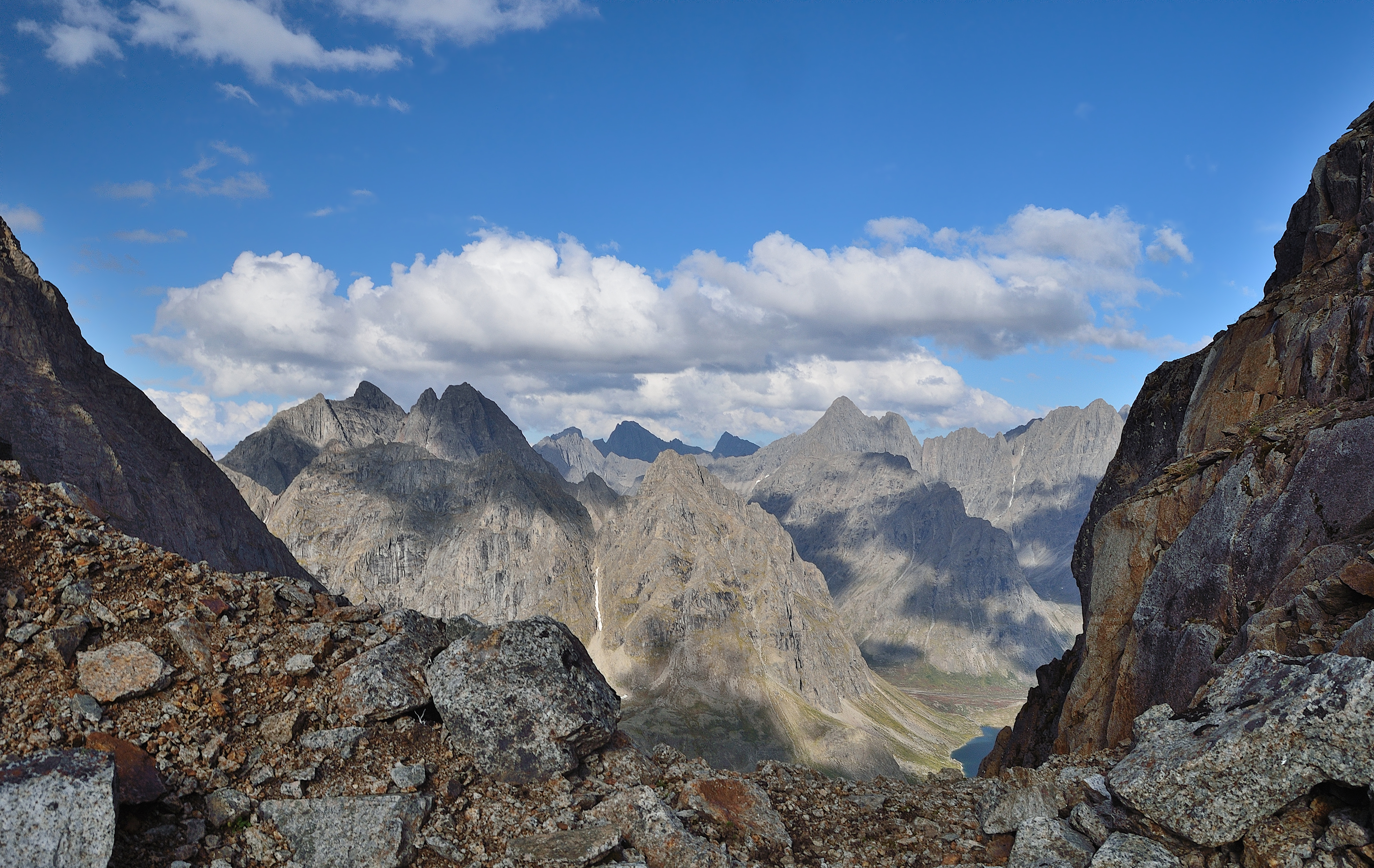
- Kodar National Park

- Location within Russia
- Location: Kalarsky District, Zabaykalsky Krai
- Nearest city: Novaya Chara
- Coordinates: 56°54′N 118°16′E
- Area: 491,710 hectares (1,215,042 acres; 4,917 km^{2}; 1,899 sq mi)
- Established: 2016
- Governing body: FGBU "Kodar"
- Website: https://npkodar.ru/

Kodar National Park (Russian: Национальный парк «Кодар») is located in Kodar Mountains of Russia, about 500 km northeast of Lake Baikal. The park encompasses extreme variations in terrain: precipitous alpine slopes ("Kodar" in the indigenous Evenks language means "steep"), over 570 alpine lakes, low-altitude glaciers, volcanoes, and an isolated small desert surrounded by taiga forest. The park was officially created in 2016. The park is located in the administrative district of Kalarsky District, Zabaykalsky Krai.

== Topography ==
The park has two sectors. The northern sector (3,383 km2) runs north–south on the Kodar Mountain range, along the eastern border of the Vitim Nature Reserve, which is also the northeastern border of Irkutsk Oblast, and the top of the Kodar ridge. This sector is about 120 km north–south, and 30 km west–east. It includes the Kodar range's highest peak, Pik BAM (3,072 metres (10,079 ft)). A spur from this region to the east covers the Chara Sands, a dune-covered sand massif, measuring 10 km by 5 km, that forms an isolated desert in the Chara River valley.

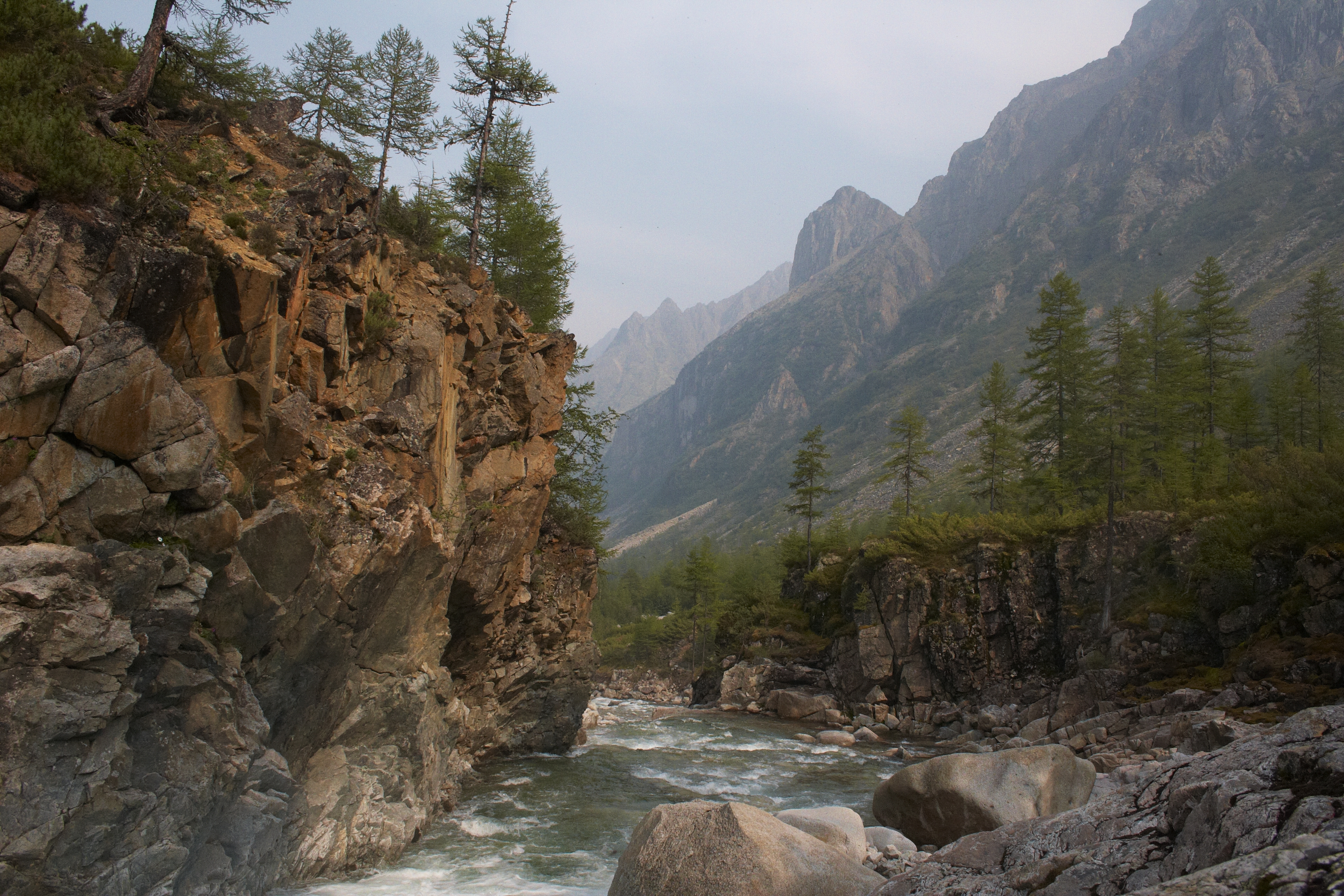
Valley of the Middle Sakukan River

The southern sector (1,953 km2) sits across the watershed of the Chara River valley, and includes the volcanic field of the Udokan Plateau.

== Ecoregion and climate ==
Because of its abrupt altitude drops in a short distance, Kodar occupies two different ecoregions. The higher altitudes are in the Trans-Baikal Bald Mountain tundra ecoregion. The lower elevations are in the East Siberian taiga ecoregion.

The climate of the park is sharply continental, classified as Subarctic climate, dry winter (Köppen climate classification Subarctic climate (Dwc)). This climate is characterized by mild summers (only 1–3 months above 10 °C (50.0 °F)) and cold winters having monthly precipitation less than one-tenth of the wettest summer month.

Novaya Chara, Russia

Climate chart (precipitation, max. and min. temperature)
J	F	M	A	M	J	J	A	S	O	N	D
0 −6 −20	0 3 −16	0 16 −4	0.4 31 14	2.3 47 32	3.9 65 48	4.4 70 55	3.9 66 50	2.2 49 35	0.4 29 14	0 8 −7	0 −5 −17
- █ Average max. and min. temperatures in °F
- █ Precipitation totals in inches
- Source: Weatherspark
Metric conversion
J	F	M	A	M	J	J	A	S	O	N	D
0 −21 −29	0 −16 −27	0 −9 −20	10 −1 −10	58 8 0	99 18 9	112 21 13	99 19 10	56 9 2	10 −2 −10	0 −13 −22	0 −21 −27
- █ Average max. and min. temperatures in °C
- █ Precipitation totals in mm

== Plants and animals ==
Species diversity is relatively high for the latitude, due to the high altitude zonation and location in the transition between alpine and taiga ecoregions. Surveys of flora and fauna in the region are in there early stages; in preliminary studies scientists have recorded 350 species of plants, 47 of mammals, 150 of birds, 23 of fish, 2 amphibians and over 350 species of insects. Notable species include black-capped marmot (Marmota camtschatica) and the Siberian bighorn sheep (Ovis nivicola).

== Tourism ==
The mountain regions of the park require a visitor's permit, available from the park's website. As a new park, there are few developed facilities. The park headquarters are in the rural town of Chara, which is just north of the Chara Sands.

== See also ==
- Protected areas of Russia
