= Smolny National Park =

National park in Mordovia, Russia

- Russian: Смольный
- IUCN category II (national park)
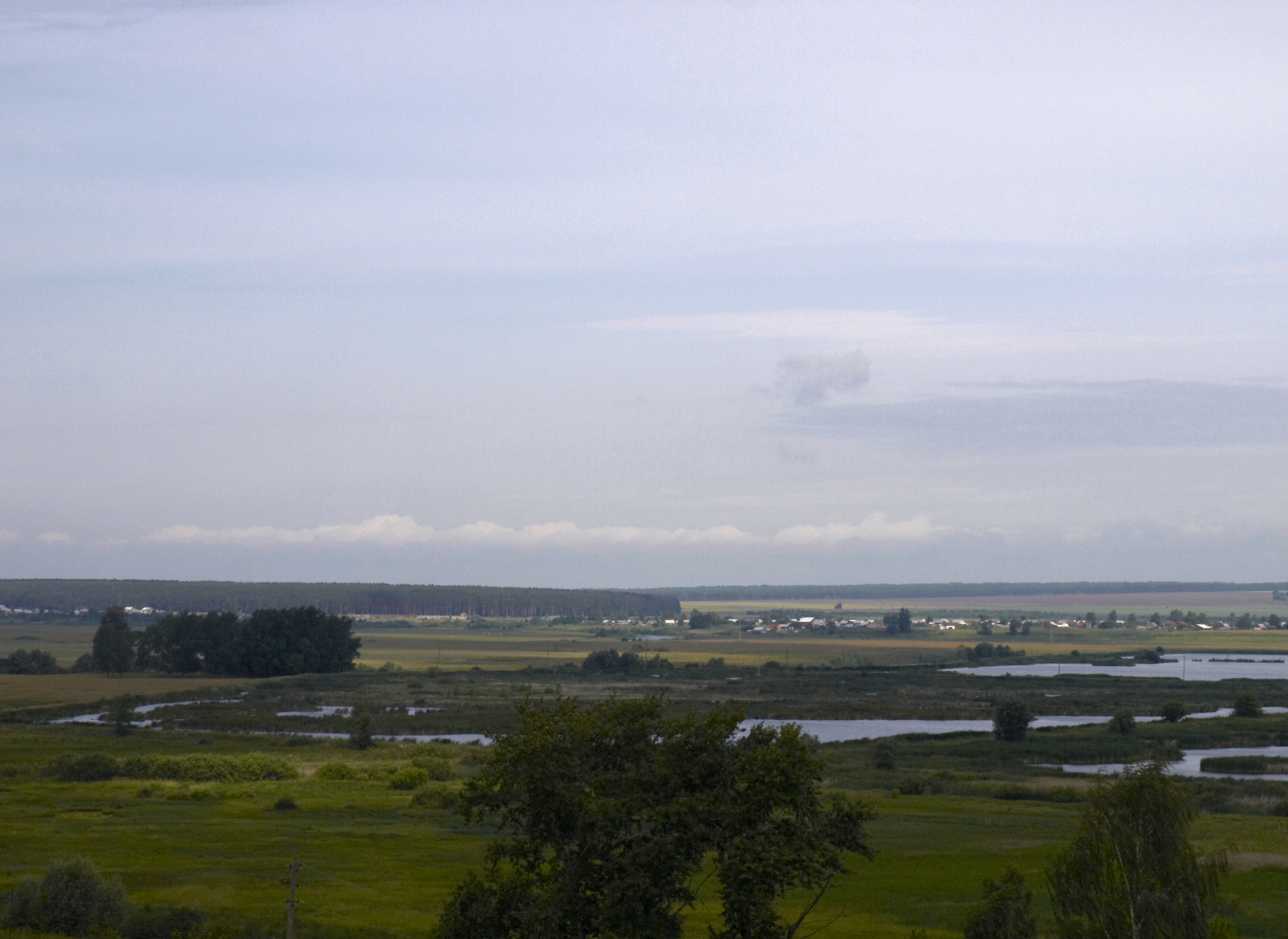
- Alatyr River, near the park

- Location within Russia
- Location: Republic of Mordovia
- Nearest city: Saransk
- Coordinates: 54°50′N 45°40′E
- Area: 36,500 hectares (90,193 acres; 141 sq mi)
- Established: 1995
- Governing body: Ministry of Natural Resources and Environment (Russia)
- Website: https://zapoved-mordovia.ru/ru/nacpark-smolniy.html

Smolny National Park (Russian: Смольный национальный парк) is in the northeastern corner of Mordovia in the east of the East European Plain of Russia. The park has a representative lowland river environment, with a slow current. The lakes and swamps are mainly concentrated in the floodplain of the Alatyr River. Marshes are mainly lowland. A few bogs are located in the southern and central parts of the park, and there are many springs. The park was created to protect the deciduous forest and representative wetlands of Mordovia. The habitat also creates a refuge for birds of international importance. It is situated in the Ichalkovsky District and Bolsheignatovsky District of the Republic.

== Topography ==
Geographically, the park is in the northwest corner of the Volga Uplands. The territory is relatively flat or slightly hilly, with a network of ravines in the northern sectors that even out towards the south. The territory is roughly rectangular, 35 km west–east, and 20 km north–south; one road runs north–south through the middle. Elevations range from 93 meters to 217 meters. The Alatyr river floodplain runs along the southern edge of the park. There are approximately 80 small streams on the grounds, and 185 km of ephemeral streams and waterways. Bogs are distributed across the Alatyr floodplain and its tributaries. There are 157 hectares of swamps in the park.

== Ecoregion and climate ==
East European forest steppe ecoregion. Smolny NP is approximately in the center of the ecoregion.

Smolny lies in the East European forest steppe ecoregion (WWF ID#419), a transition zone between the broadleaf forests of the north and the grasslands to the south, cutting across the middle of Eastern Europe from Bulgaria through Russia. This forest steppe ecoregion is characterized by a mosaic of forests, steppe, and riverine wetlands.

The climate in Smolny is Humid continental climate, warm summer (Köppen climate classification (Dfb)). This climate is characterized by large swings in temperature, both diurnally and seasonally, with mild summers and cold, snowy winters. The coldest month is January (-11 C on average); the warmest month is July (+19 C). Average precipitation is 440 – 550 mm. The frost-free period is 125–149 days. The predominant winds are from the southwest.

== Flora ==
The floodplain of the meandering Alatyr forms a wetland environment with the biological properties of a eutrophic (Greek: "well-nourished") lake - with rich vegetation, shallow and warm. Overall, forests dominate 95% of the territory. Coniferous forest (about 40% of the land) are predominantly pine and spruce. In the south the forests are mostly pine forests on the terraces above the floodplain. In the north are broad-leaf oak, linden, maple and ash forests. About 12% of the park is secondary forest. In the meadow areas the grasses include Kentucky bluegrass, fescue and foxtail. The park has recorded over 200 species of mushrooms, 100 species of mosses, and 750 species of vascular plants.

== Fauna ==
The fish of the rivers and lakes include common pike, dace, chub, gudgeon, loach, eel, perch, and silver carp. The mammals are those typical of forest-steppe forests: elk, wild boar, fox, marten, weasels, and various mice and voles. Nesting bird include the curlew, oystercatcher, owl, eagle imperial eagle, and Pallid Harrier. 206 species of birds have been recorded in the park. Hunting and fishing are forbidden.

== Tourism ==
The park is accessible by bus to the village of Smolny on the edge of the park. The grounds have furnished recreational areas with picnic pavilions, areas for swimming, and areas for collecting mushrooms and berries. There is a museum on the site of the ecology and natural history of the region in Mordovia.

== See also ==
- Protected areas of Russia
- National parks of Russia
- Nature reserves of Russia (zapovedniks)
