= Tokinsko-Stanovoy National Park =

National park of Russia

- (Russian: Токинско-Становой)
- IUCN category II (national park)
- Location within Russia
- Location: Amur Oblast
- Nearest city: Zeya, Russia
- Coordinates: 55°41′N 130°09′E
- Area: 243,000 hectares (600,466 acres; 2,430 km^{2}; 938 sq mi)
- Established: December 20, 2019
- Governing body: FGBU "Tokinsko-Stanovoy "

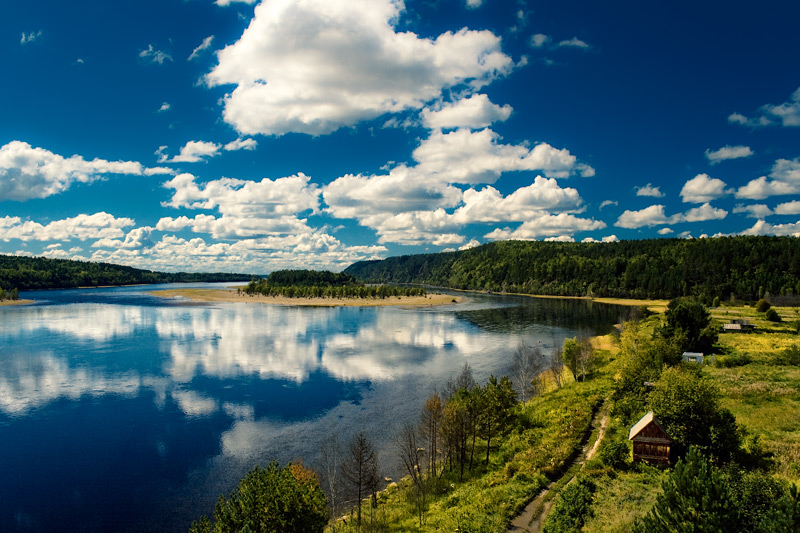

Tokinsko-Stanovoy National Park (Russian: Национальный парк «Токинско-Становой») is located at the mountainous headwaters of the Zeya River, in the Stanovoy Highlands of the Russian Far East. It was created in 2019 to protect important natural features - particularly the Siberian snow sheep, and also the cultural heritage of the reindeer-herding indigenous Evenki people. The park is located in the Zeysky District of Amur Oblast, at the meeting point of the borders of Amur Oblast, the Sakha Republic, and Khabarovsk Krai.

== Topography ==
The park protects a remote region of the upper watershed of the Zeya River, on the southern slopes of the Toko-Stanovik mountain range. The large Zeya Reservoir is downstream 140 km to the southwest. The park itself stretches 120 km from west to east along the range, and an average of 30 km north to south on the slopes. Although Lake Bolshoye Toko lends its name to the mountains and the park, the lake itself is 30 km to the north of the park on the north slope of the Stanovoy mountains.

Terrain in the park is notable for glacial valleys and lakes at the higher elevations, Pleistocene (Ice Age) volcanic plateaus and extinct mini-volcanic cones, and lower forests representing taiga of the northern Amur and southern Siberian types.

== Ecoregion and climate ==
The higher elevations of the park are in the Trans-Baikal Bald Mountain tundra ecoregion, making it part of a linked chain of mountain tundra (permafrost, moss and lichen, and bare rock) micro-regions stretching from Lake Baikal (1,300 km to the west of the park) to the Sea of Okhotsk 400 km to the east. The lower elevations of the park are in the East Siberian taiga ecoregion.

The climate of the park is Humid continental climate, warm summer (Köppen climate classification (Dwb)), with a dry winter. This climate is characterized by large seasonal temperature differentials and a warm summer (at least four months averaging over 10 °C (50 °F), but no month averaging over 22 °C (72 °F), and cold winters having monthly precipitation less than one-tenth of the wettest summer month.

Zeya, Amur Oblast, Russia

Climate chart (precipitation, max. and min. temperature)
J	F	M	A	M	J	J	A	S	O	N	D
0.3 −9 −26	0.5 2 −19	1.8 19 0	4.5 41 23	7.8 60 40	9.8 73 54	12 77 59	11 72 55	7.8 58 41	4 36 21	1.7 9 −6	0.6 −8 −23
- █ Average max. and min. temperatures in °F
- █ Precipitation totals in inches
- Source: weatherspark.com
Metric conversion
J	F	M	A	M	J	J	A	S	O	N	D
7.6 −23 −32	13 −17 −28	46 −7 −18	114 5 −5	198 16 4	249 23 12	310 25 15	269 22 13	198 14 5	102 2 −6	43 −13 −21	15 −22 −31
- █ Average max. and min. temperatures in °C
- █ Precipitation totals in mm

== Plants and animals ==
Altitude zones dictate floral communities in the park: Siberian spruce (Picea obovata) and Siberian fir (Abies sibirica) on the lower slopes, Siberian pine (Pinus sibirica) in a thin strip above that, and mountain tundra above about 1,200 meters. Meadows in the park support herds of reindeer, supporting a small number of Evenks. The park is a resting place for the critically endangered Siberian crane on its north–south migration route. The park also supports a rare subspecies of the Siberian snow sheep, the Okhotsk snow sheep (Ovis nivicola alleni).

== See also ==
- Protected areas of Russia
