= Beringia National Park =

Northeastern region of Russia

- IUCN category II (national park)
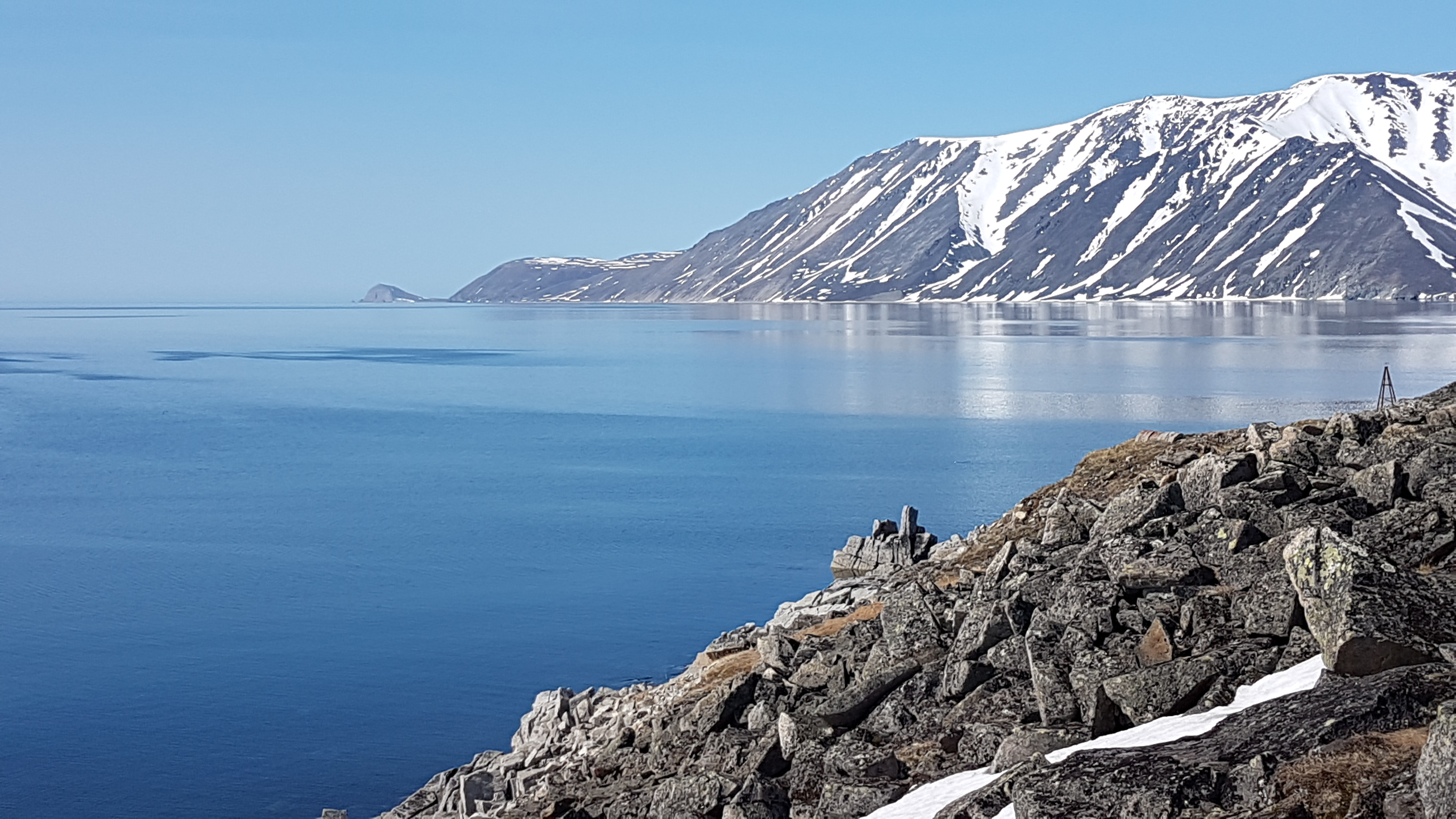

- Location within Russia
- Location: Chukotka Autonomous Okrug
- Nearest city: Anadyr
- Coordinates: 64°22′N 173°18′E
- Area: 30,532 square kilometres (11,788 sq mi)
- Established: 2013
- Governing body: Ministry of Natural Resources and Environment (Russia)
- Website: park-beringia.ru/en

Beringia National Park (Russian: Берингия) is on the eastern tip of Chukotka Autonomous Okrug ("Chukotka"), the most northeastern region of Russia. It is on the western (i.e., Asian) side of the Bering Strait.

== Overview ==
Until 11,000 BCE, the territory of the park was connected by a land bridge – known as "Beringia" – to North America. On the eastern side, in Alaska, is the Bering Land Bridge National Preserve, operated by the US National Park Service. There have been talks between the US and Russia about joining the two parks into a cross-border "international park", but as yet nothing has been formalized. Most of the sparse population in the area are the indigenous Chukchi people or Yupik peoples. The park was formalized as a National Park in 2013.

The park is spread over two districts on the Chukchi Peninsula: Providensky District to the south, and Chukotsky District to the north. The topography is maritime highland subarctic tundra. The mountains are medium height – averaging 900 meters, with the highest being Mt. Iskhodnaya at 1194 meters. There are also extensive tundra plains.

== Ecoregion and climate ==
Beringia is in the Bering tundra ecoregion. The region experiences a Subarctic climate, without dry season (Köppen climate classification Subarctic climate (Dfc)). This climate is characterized by mild summers (only 1–3 months above 10 °C (50.0 °F)) and cold, snowy winters (coldest month below −3 °C (26.6 °F)). January is the coldest month with an average temperature in Anadyr of −22.6 °C (−8.7 °F), and an average temperature of +11.6 °C (52.9 °F) in July.

== See also ==
- Protected areas of Russia
