= Udegeyskaya Legenda National Park =

National park in Primorsky Krai, Russia

- Russian: Удэгейская легенда English: Udege Legend
- IUCN category II (national park)
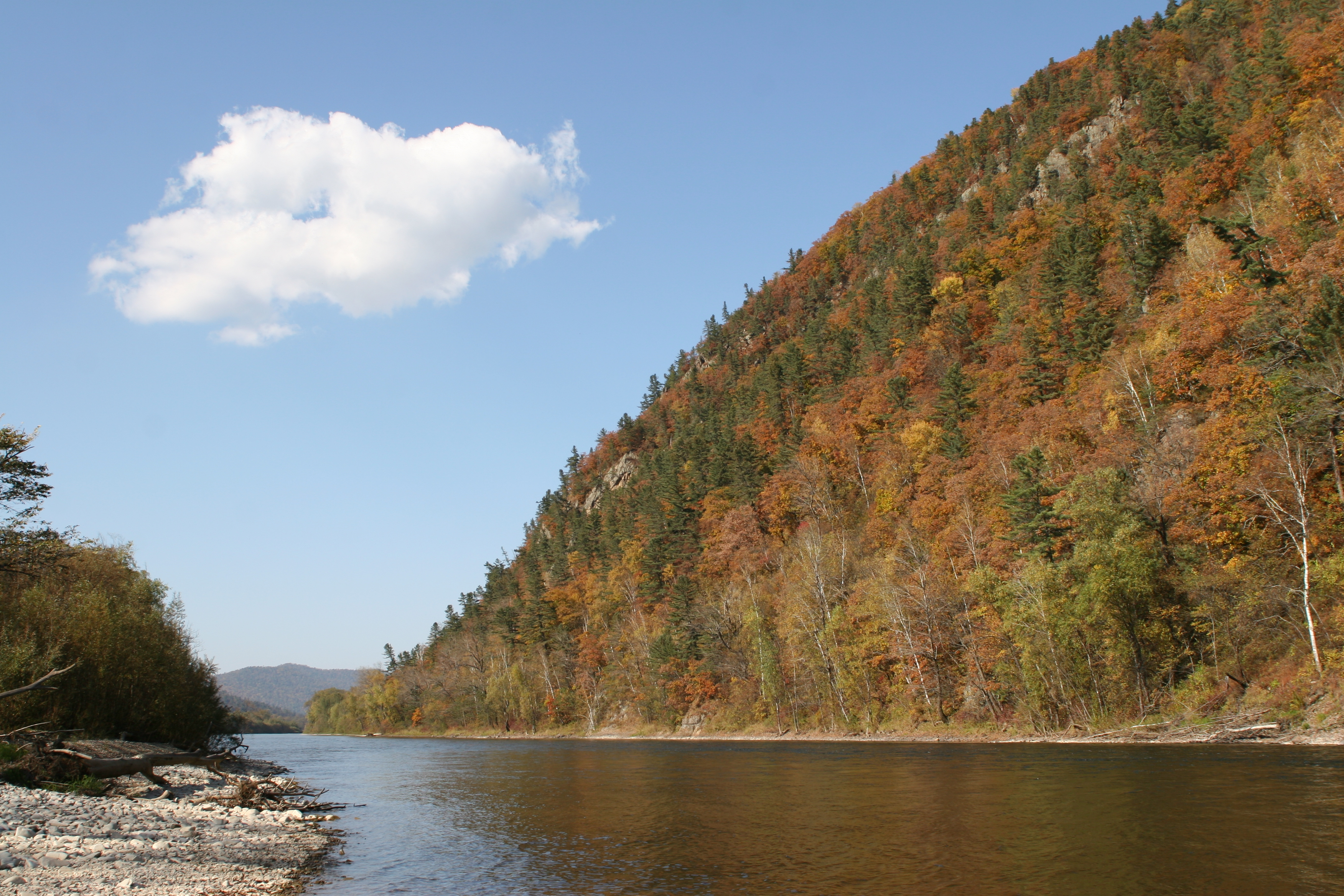
- The Greater Ussurka River

- Location within Russia
- Location: Krasnoarmeysky District of Primorsky Krai
- Nearest city: Vladivostok
- Coordinates: 45°49′N 135°25′E
- Area: 103,744 hectares (256,357 acres; 1,037 km^{2}; 401 sq mi)
- Established: 2007
- Governing body: FGBU "Udegeyskaya Legenda "
- Website: http://ud-legend.ru/

Udegeyskaya Legenda National Park (Russian: Удэгейская легенда, which translates as Udege Legend) covers the richest coniferous-deciduous forest on the western slope of the Central Sikhote-Alin mountains of the Russian Far East. The Sikhote-Alin is a range that runs north–south through Primorsky Krai (in English, "Maritime Region"). The park is designed to protect west-slope river valley habitat, and to support the remnant of the indigenous Udege people. The area is known for abundant fishing and boating on the streams and rivers. It is also a refuge for the endangered Amur tiger. The park is roughly midway between the city of Vladivostok (520 km to the southwest), and Khabarovsk (440 km to the northwest). The relatively warm waters of the Sea of Japan are to the east, the Korean peninsula to the south, and China to the West.

== Topography ==
Udegeyskaya Legende National Park (upper left), and Sikhote-Alin Zapovednik (lower right)

In many ways it is a midpoint park: between the Sikhote-Alin Nature Reserve just east of the ridge and the Amur River basin, between the Zov Tigra National Park / Lazovsky Nature Reserve to the south and Anyuysky National Park and other protected areas to the north. Elevations in the borders range from 180 meters in river lowlands, to 1,330 meters at the mountain crest.

The mountain valleys of Udegyskaya Legende feed the Armu River and the Bolshaya Ussurka River, which flow west to the Ussuri River and ultimately the Amur River, which flows north to the Okhotsk Sea. The main river valley of the Ussurka runs to the north-northeast, along the Sikhote-Alin fault, it is passable to small boats in lower region, with oxbow lakes and marshy banks. The river valleys are narrow and winding. Slopes average 10-15 degrees, but are often 15-25 degrees. At the headwaters of streams, rocky outcrops are rare. The banks of the Armu, though, are rocky and steep, with frequent rapids and waterfalls. There are three small settlements in the park: Far Kut, Dersu, and Ostovnoe.

== Climate and ecoregion ==
The climate of Udegeyskaya Legenda is Humid continental climate, warm summer (Köppen climate classification (Dfb)). This climate is characterized by large swings in temperature, both diurnally and seasonally, with mild summers and cold, snowy winters. The average temperature is 3.4 degrees (F) in January to 61.4 F in August. Average annual precipitation is 31.1 inches. Autumn in the region is clear, warm, dry and with gradually declining temperatures. This has been called the "golden Far East Autumn".

Sikhote-Alin, Primorsky Krai, Russia

Climate chart (precipitation, max. and min. temperature)
J	F	M	A	M	J	J	A	S	O	N	D
0.8 12 −5	0.7 18 −1	1 28 11	1.8 42 25	3.2 52 35	3.7 58 43	5 65 51	5.2 69 54	4.5 63 45	2.5 50 31	1.8 31 13	0.9 16 −1
- █ Average max. and min. temperatures in °F
- █ Precipitation totals in inches
Metric conversion
J	F	M	A	M	J	J	A	S	O	N	D
20 −11 −21	18 −8 −18	25 −2 −12	46 6 −4	81 11 2	94 14 6	127 19 11	132 21 12	114 17 7	64 10 −1	46 0 −10	23 −9 −18
- █ Average max. and min. temperatures in °C
- █ Precipitation totals in mm

Udegeyskaya Legende is in the Ussuri broadleaf and mixed forests ecoregion, which covers a mountainous areas above the lower Amur River and Ussuri River in the Russian Far East.

The park is situated in a way that maximizes plant and animal diversity. It is at multiple meeting points: the meeting of continental and maritime zones (Eurasia and the Pacific Ocean) and the meeting of hot and cold-loving species from both temperate and sub-tropic zones. It is also a geological contact region between ancient (Achean-Proterozoic) stable base rocks to the west, and more active tectonic formations to the east in the Sea of Japan. Furthermore, it is on major migration routes of birds and other animals, and has a topography that escaped both recent glaciation and human development.

The resulting diversity of habitats and isolation gives the Primorsky region the highest levels of biodiversity in Russia.

For aquatic habitat, the park is in the "Lower Amur" freshwater ecoregion (FEOW ID#616), a region that is characterized in general by stream systems of strongly eroded river valleys and a well-developed floodplain on Amur River. Ice forms on rivers up to 6 months of the year, and most of the streams are rain fed. The freshwater ecoregion contains no strict endemic fishes.

== Plants ==
Given the steep topography, altitude zones for plants are notable. In the lowlands, deciduous forests with elm, ash and Manchurian walnut, cedar pine and spruce - to higher-level spruce-fir forests with birch. The park records 30 species of vascular plant requiring protection in the area, including Japanese mountain yam, fox nut, Pacific saxifrage, ginseng, and yew.

== Animals ==
Besides the presence of the Amur tiger, the park is home to brown bears and the Asian black bears, characteristic of the forests of western slope of the Sikhote-Alin. Smaller forest mammals are sable, marten, badger and weasels, along with lynx and leopard cat. The river banks are home to minks and otters, and the lowlands rivers have elk and moose. The area is particularly rich in insects - over 10,000 species are estimated to live in the territory, including a species of longhorn beetle that is believed to be the largest in Russia.

== History ==
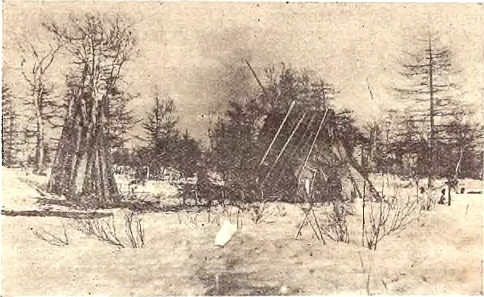
Gabled yurt of a Udege family, early 1920s

The region and park boundaries are the historic home of the Udege people. A census in 2010 put the number of Udege at under 1,500. They traditionally have a hunting-fishing culture.

== Tourism ==
Eco-tourism is a stated purpose of the park, and visitors are welcome in the recreational zones. The park administration provides some accommodation in a guest house and campgrounds, and provides for rental of snowmobiles and inflatable rafts. There is a geological museum on the site, and guided tours can be arranged for a fee. Unguided trails are developed, such as an ecological trail that leads to the "Kovalevskaya yew grove", which features ancient yew trees. The park is in a remote area - the nearest train station is at Dalnerechensk, 144 km from the borders of the park - but its position on the west slope of the Sikhote-Alin makes it more accessible to tourists on the main road to the west.

== See also ==
- Protected areas of Russia
