= Zigalga National Park =

National park of Russia

- (Russian: Зигальга)
- IUCN category II (national park)
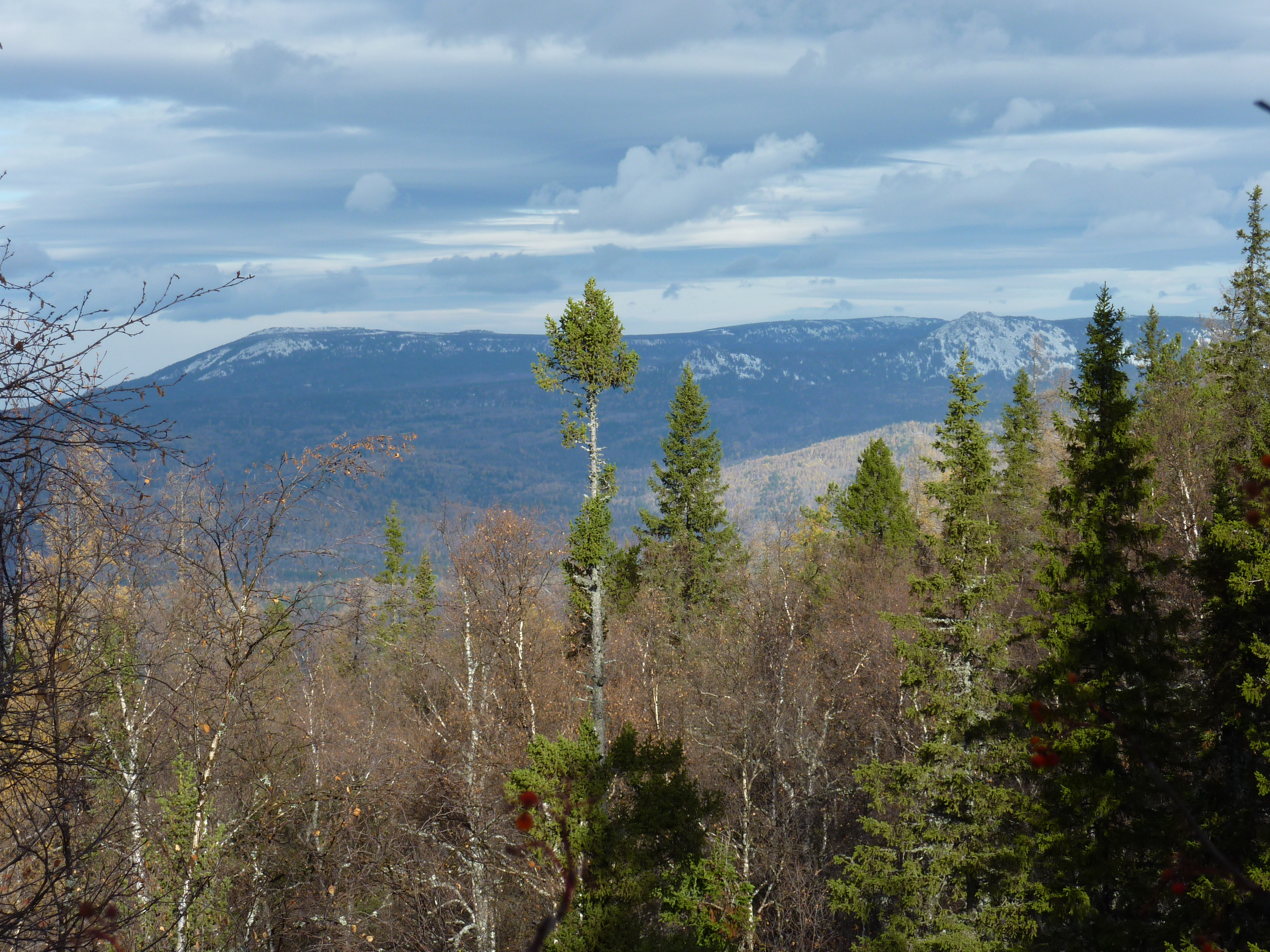
- Zigalga National Park

- Location within Russia
- Location: Chelyabinsk Oblast
- Nearest city: Chelyabinsk
- Coordinates: 54°35′N 58°31′E
- Area: 45,662 hectares (112,833 acres; 457 km^{2}; 176 sq mi)
- Established: November 18, 2019
- Governing body: FGBU "Zigalga "
- Website: https://zigalga.org/

Zigalga National Park (Russian: Национальный парк «Зигальга») is located on the high Zigalga Ridge of the Southern Ural Mountains in Russia, on the transition between Europe and Siberia. Much of the territory is untouched by human activity and so supports Ice Age relict floral communities through all altitude zones - pine and birch forest, dark coniferous taiga, alpine meadows and mountain tundra. The park was officially created in 2019. The park is located in the Katav-Ivanovsky District of Chelyabinsk Oblast.

== Topography ==
Ziglalga National Park connects two large protected areas on the main ridge of the Southern Urals, with Zyuratkul National Park to the northeast, and the South Ural Nature Reserve to the southwest. The park includes headwaters of the Yuryuzan River and the Kutkurka River. The highest point is at Mount Poperechnaya (1,387 metres (4,551 ft))

== Ecoregion and climate ==
The park is at the southern extremity of the Urals montane tundra and taiga ecoregion. It is closely surrounded on three sides by three other ecoregions: East European forest steppe to the west, West Siberian taiga to the northeast, and Kazakh forest steppe to the south.

The climate of the ecoregion is Subarctic climate, without dry season (Köppen climate classification Subarctic climate (Dfc)). This climate is characterized by mild summers (only 1-3 months above 10 °C (50.0 °F)) and cold, snowy winters (coldest month below −3 °C (26.6 °F)).

Zlatoust, Chelyabinsk Oblast, Russia

Climate chart (precipitation, max. and min. temperature)
J	F	M	A	M	J	J	A	S	O	N	D
2.7 16 2	2.1 19 3	3 30 14	5.1 47 30	8.2 61 41	9 70 50	9.7 72 53	8.4 67 49	7 56 40	6 42 30	4 27 16	3.5 19 7
- █ Average max. and min. temperatures in °F
- █ Precipitation totals in inches
- Source: world-climates.com
Metric conversion
J	F	M	A	M	J	J	A	S	O	N	D
69 −9 −17	53 −7 −16	76 −1 −10	130 8 −1	208 16 5	229 21 10	246 22 12	213 19 9	178 13 4	152 6 −1	102 −3 −9	89 −7 −14
- █ Average max. and min. temperatures in °C
- █ Precipitation totals in mm

== Plants and animals ==
Altitude dictates the forest type in the park. On the foothills and slopes up to 750 meters the cover is Picea obovata (Siberian spruce), Abies sibirica (Siberian fir), and stands of Tilia sibirica (Siberian linden). Alpine peat bogs are common, both mesotrophic and oligomesotrophic, as are a number of boreal plant species at the southern end of their range. Above 750 meters, the cover turns to a strip of subalpine meadows. Above 1000-1200 meters is mountainous tundra. 95% of the park is forested and 4% is alpine meadow. Within the park scientists have recorded 500 species of vascular plants, 55 of mammals, 160 of birds, 13 of amphibians and reptiles, and 20 species of fish.

== See also ==
- Protected areas of Russia
