= Nechkinsky National Park =

National park in Russia

- Нечкинский
- IUCN category II (national park)
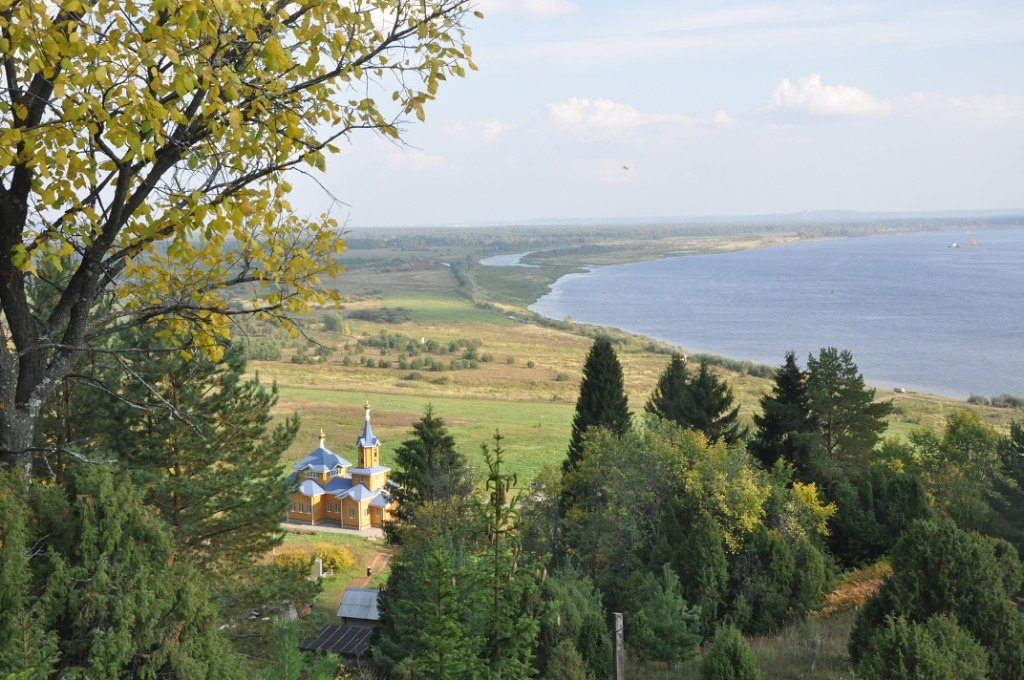
- Nechkinsky National Park

- Location within Russia
- Location: Udmurt Republic
- Nearest city: Izhevsk
- Coordinates: 56°41′N 53°47′E
- Area: 20,753 hectares (51,282 acres; 208 km^{2}; 80 sq mi)
- Established: October 16, 1997
- Governing body: FGBU "Nechkinsky"
- Website: http://www.nechkinsky.ru/

Nechkinsky National Park (Russian: Национальный парк «Нечкинский») is an important biological and cultural reserve of Udmurtia (the Udmurt Republic), situated in the middle valley of the Kama River, its tributary the Siva River, and the coastal part of the Votkinsk reservoir. This places Nechkinsky on the western side of the central Ural Mountains. The territory is mostly forest and river floodplains, with a number of ancient archaeological sites on the grounds. It is near the city of Izhevsk.

== Topography ==
The park covers a forested valley of the watershed of the Siva River, a tributary of the Kama. The valley is about 110–160 meters deep, and 3–20 km wide. It is asymmetrical, in that the left bank is flat, and the right bank is steep hillside. The Kama River at this point has a wide floodplain, with several fluvial terraces at higher levels.

== Ecoregion and climate ==
The ecoregion of Nechkinsky is Sarmatic mixed forests (WWF ID#436). This ecoregion is a strip of low forests, lakes and wetlands, running from the Baltic Sea east to the Urals. Forest cover is typically mixed conifer and deciduous trees, with large unbroken tracts under pressure from agriculture.

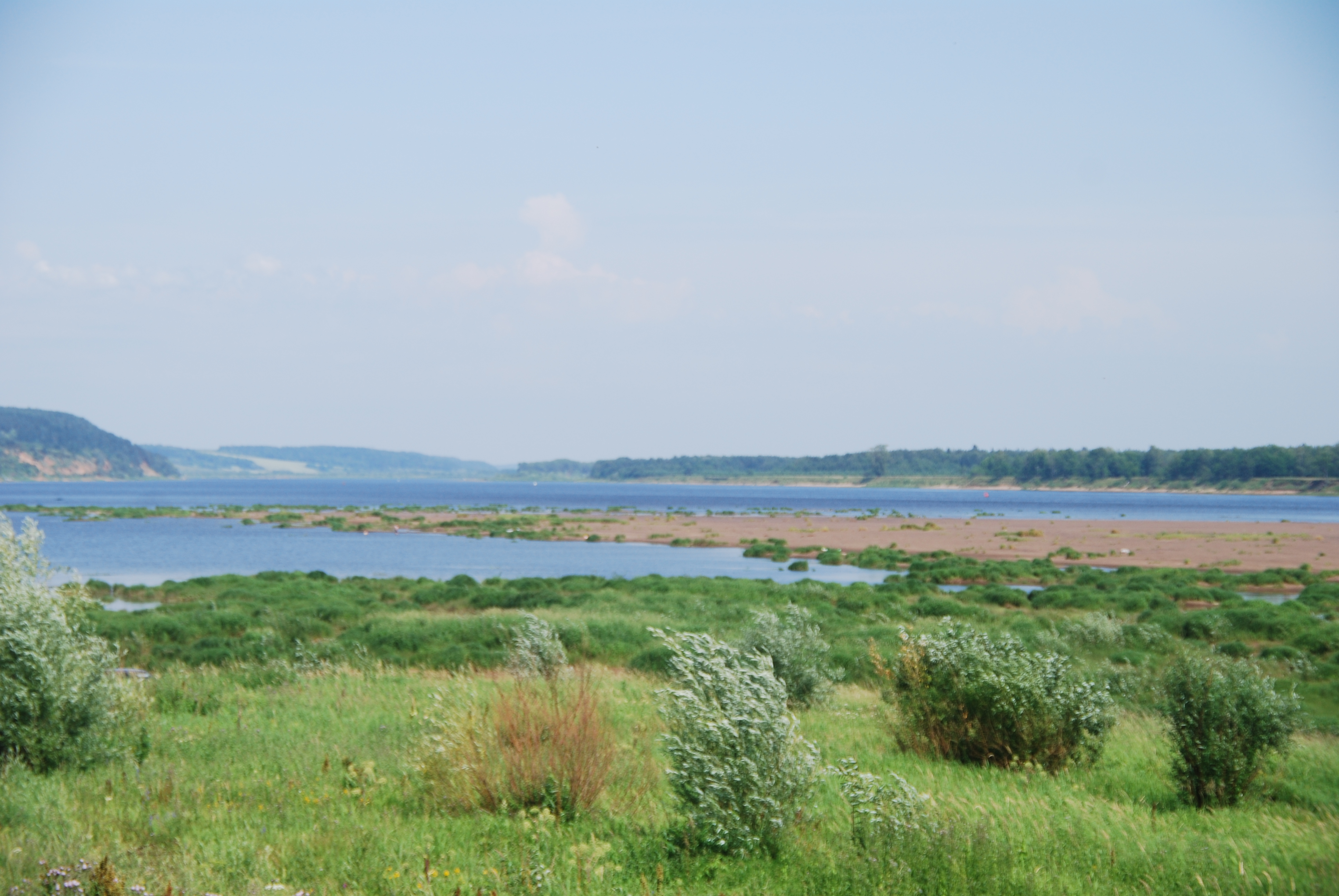
Kama River, Nechkinsky

The climate of Nechkinsky is Humid continental climate, warm summer (Köppen climate classification (Dfb)). This climate is characterized by large swings in temperature, both diurnally and seasonally, with mild summers and cold, snowy winters. Average temperatures range from 10 F in January to 66 F in July. Annual precipitation averages 20 inches.

Izhevsk, Udmurt Republic, Russia

Climate chart (precipitation, max. and min. temperature)
J	F	M	A	M	J	J	A	S	O	N	D
1.4 13 −1	1 17 3	1.1 30 14	1.3 47 31	1.5 65 43	2.3 72 52	2.6 76 57	2.5 71 52	2.1 59 43	2 42 31	1.8 28 18	1.5 18 6
- █ Average max. and min. temperatures in °F
- █ Precipitation totals in inches
- Source: world-climates.com
Metric conversion
J	F	M	A	M	J	J	A	S	O	N	D
36 −11 −18	25 −8 −16	28 −1 −10	33 8 −1	38 18 6	58 22 11	66 25 14	64 22 11	53 15 6	51 5 −1	46 −2 −8	38 −8 −14
- █ Average max. and min. temperatures in °C
- █ Precipitation totals in mm

== Plants ==
The forest communities are a mixture of taiga, mixed forests and steppe-forests. On the lower levels there are oligotrophic and mesotrophic bogs. In the gullies and depressions there are Siberian spruce and associated species. On both the left and right banks of the Siva River there are pine forests, with some stands of silver fir and Siberian larch. In the lower levels the forest cover is broadleaf (oak) communities, with secondary cover of birch and aspen. The park records 712 species of vascular plants, representing 70% of the species found in Udmurtia. The wetlands of the Siva include the Kemulskoye bog (2 thousand hectares).

== Animals ==
A census of species in the park in 2002 recorded 50 mammals, 191 birds, 5 reptiles, 8 amphibians, 37 fish. Special studies of were done of mollusks (33 species), spiders (120 species), beetles (600 species), butterflies (500 species) and dragonflies (25 species). Rare species include the vulnerable Russian desman, a semi-aquatic large mole that looks like a muskrat and is under protection because of historical trapping for its fur.

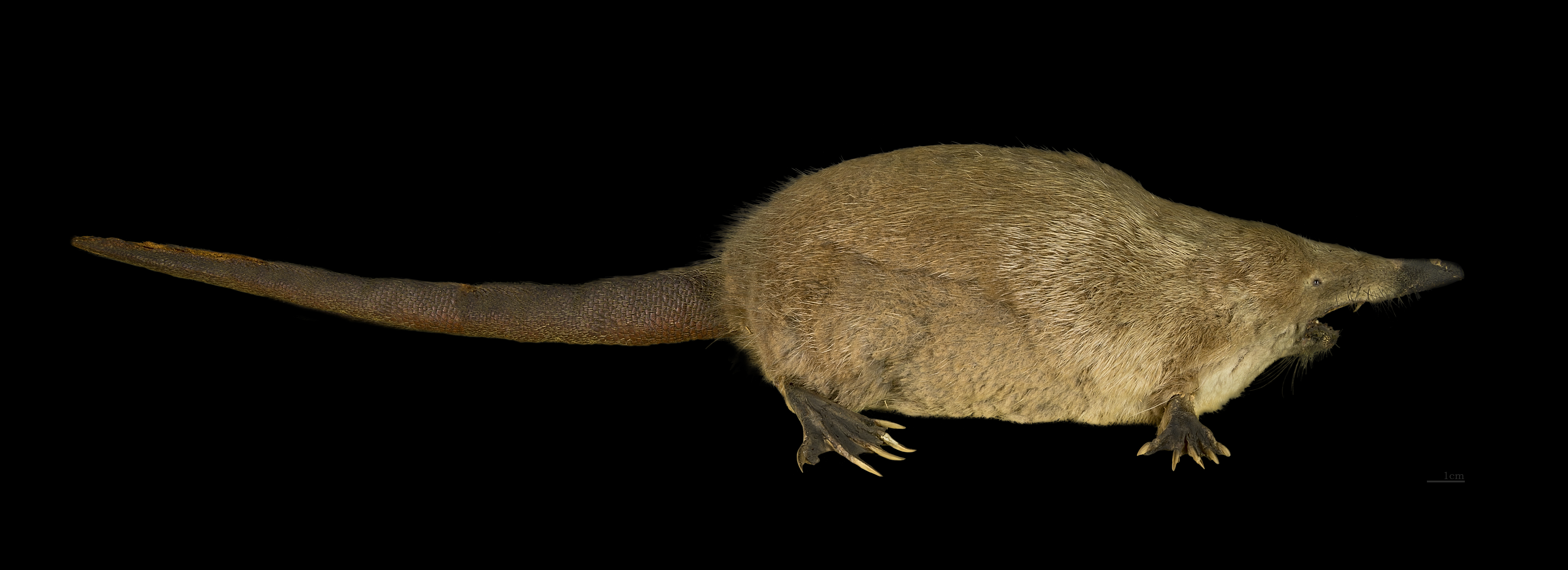
Russian desman; historically trapped for fur and now protected in Nechkinsky. (Vulnerable species)

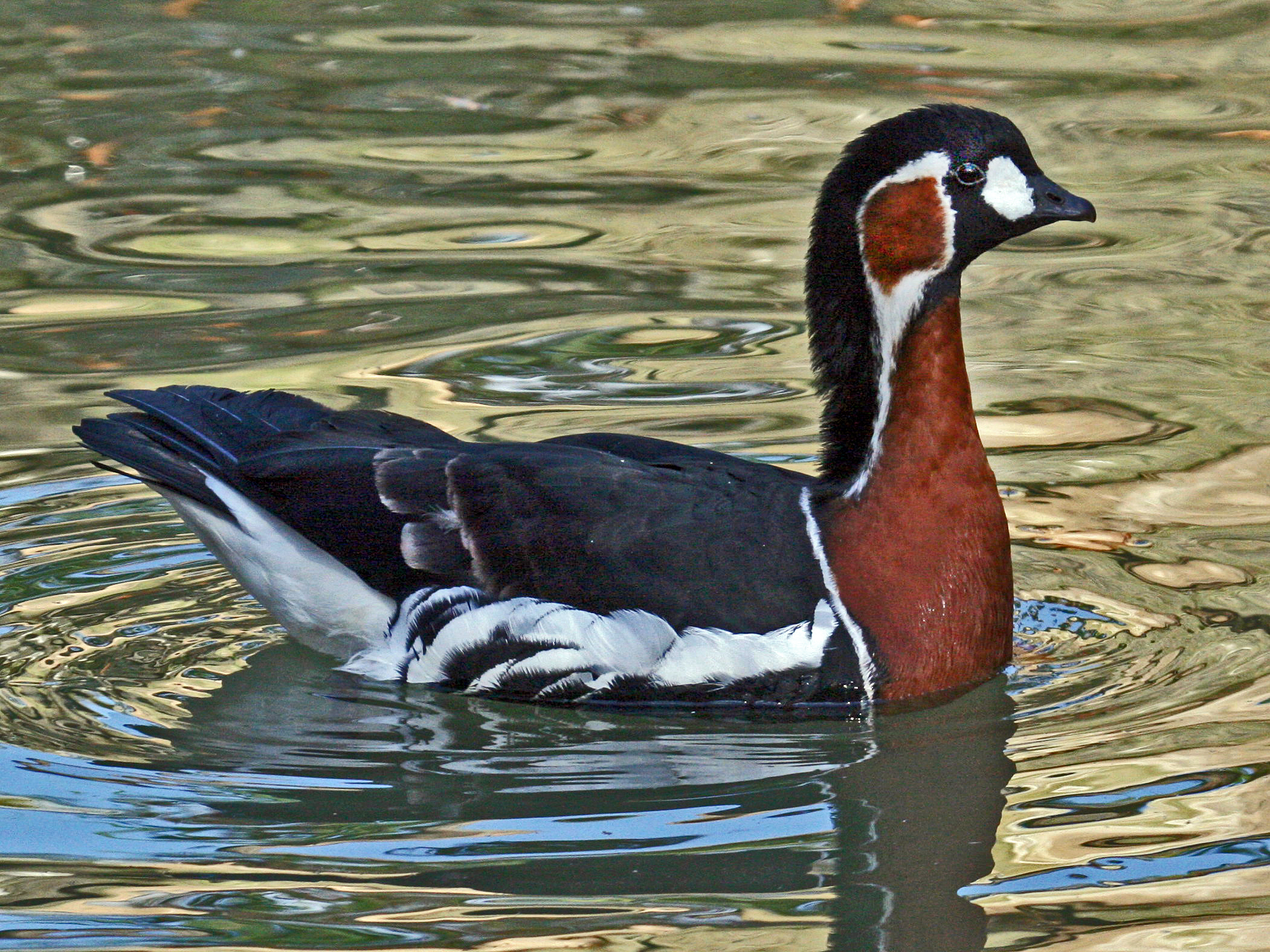
Red-breasted goose. (Endangered species)

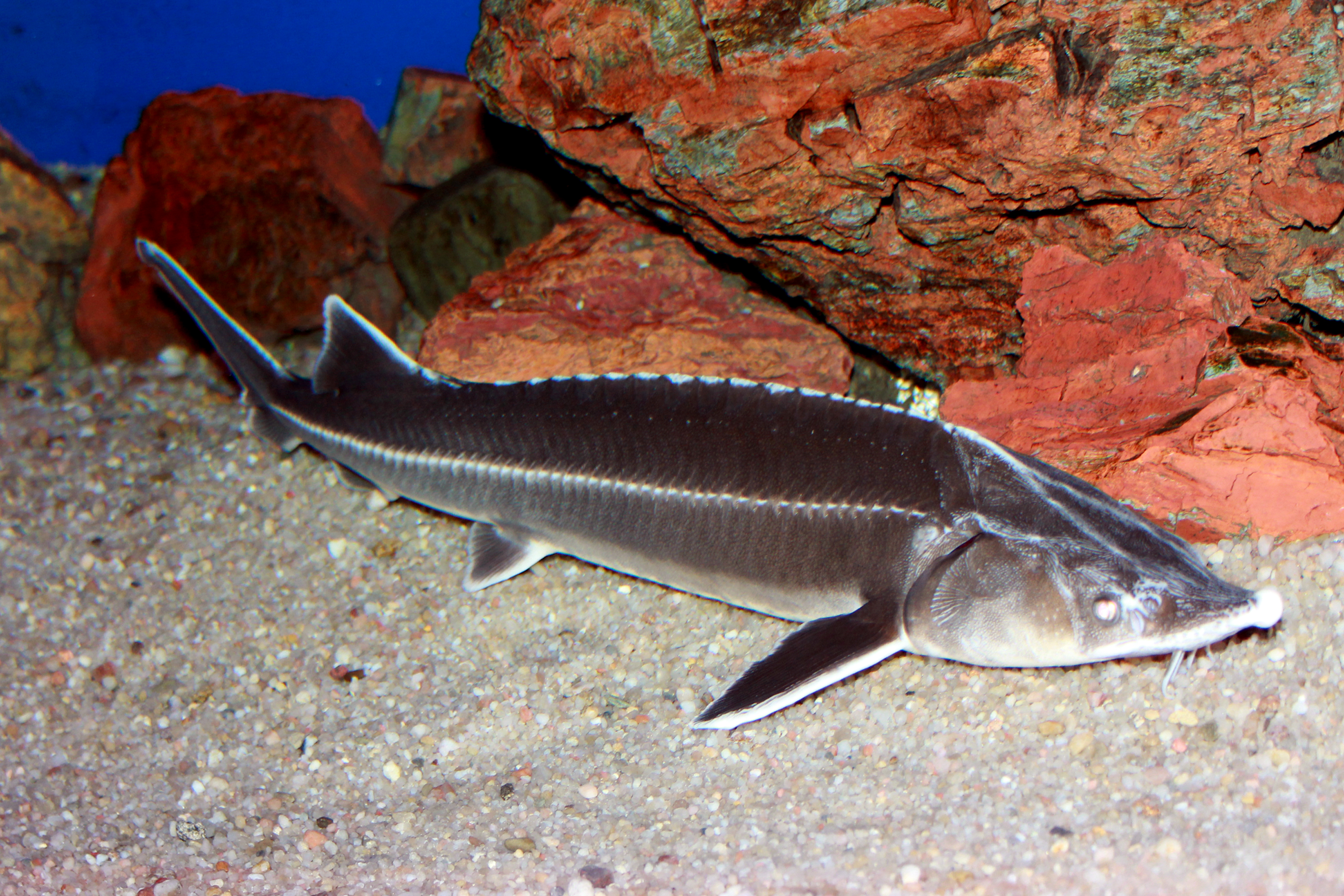
Sterlet, a type of Eurasian sturgeon. (Vulnerable species)

== History ==
Early settlements sites of ancient hunters and fishers (3rd - 2nd millennium BCE) have been excavated in the park. The earliest identifiable archaeological sites are the remains of fortified Iron Age settlements from the first millennium BCE, associated with the Ananyino culture. The Ananyino were an early Finno-Ugric languages people.

== Tourism ==
There are several educational trails developed around ecological themes of a particular habitat or geological type; park employees are available as guides on these trails. The park has one long developed hiking trail (Tourist route "Dear Ancestors", 25 km) that has four rest areas along the route, two observation decks for views of the reservoir, and passages along old trails used by peasants in former times. There are two access points for bathing in the Kama River. There are also two ski trails and five auto routes (for which written passes must be obtained from the forest administration office.

== See also ==
- Protected areas of Russia
