= Kislovodsk National Park =

National park of Russia

- (Russian: Кисловодский национальный парк)
- IUCN category II (national park)
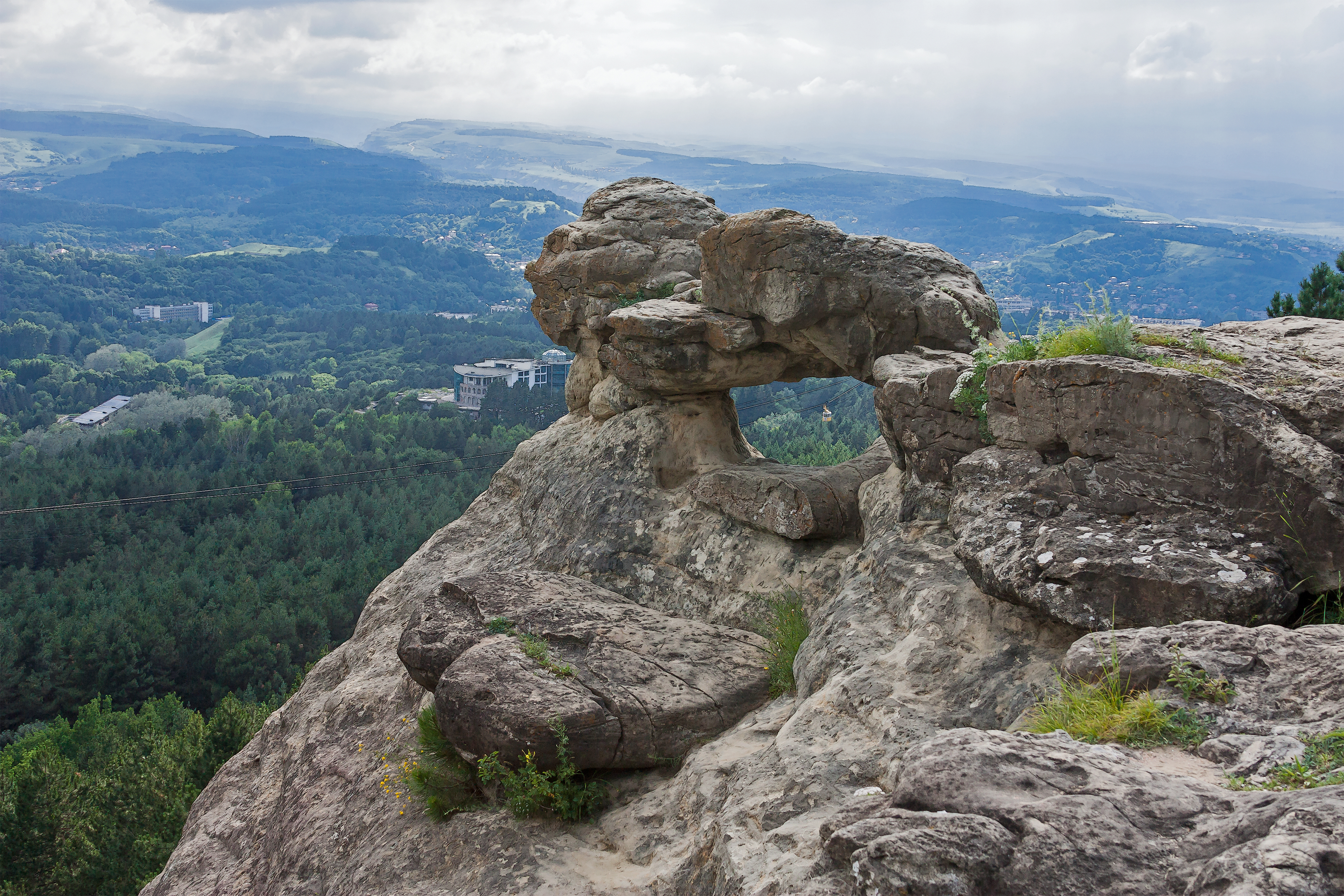
- Kislovodsk National Park

- Location within Russia
- Location: Stavropol Krai
- Nearest city: Kislovodsk
- Coordinates: 43°53′N 42°45′E
- Area: 966 hectares (2,387 acres; 10 km^{2}; 4 sq mi)
- Established: June 2, 2016
- Governing body: FGBU "Kislovodsky"
- Website: http://kispark.ru/

Kislovodsk National Park (Russian: Кисловодский национальный парк) is an urban park stretching from the city center of Kislovodsk up the slopes of the adjacent Dzhinal Ridge. It is located on the foothills north of the Caucasus Mountains (the North Caucasus region) in the Russian province of Stavropol Krai. Kislovodsk is a resort town (with 300 days of sunshine per year), and the park supports mineral springs, hiking paths, and a cable car to the top of the ridge. The park is the largest urban park in Europe. The park was officially created in 2016.

== Topography ==
The park extends 5 km from the center of the city into the southeast, up the slopes of the Dzhinal ridge (1541 meters). At the lower elevation is the "Pervomayskaya glade", a large public space capable of supporting over 100,000 people for events. The Olkhovka River runs along the southern edge, and the surrounding hills include Pine Hill and the spurs of the Dzhinal ridge with the Bolshoye and Maloye Saddle peaks. Mount Elbrus and the main ridge of the Caucasus mountains are visible in the distance from the observation decks on the high peaks.

== Ecoregion and climate ==
The ecoregion of Kislovodsk at the very southern edge of the Pontic–Caspian steppe ecoregion, bordering on the Caucasus mixed forests in the higher elevations immediately to the south. As it is located in a transition zone with moderate climate, the park supports a wide variety of plants and animals.

The climate of the park is Subarctic climate, without dry season (Köppen climate classification Subarctic climate (Dfc)). This climate is characterized by mild summers and cold, snowy winters.

Kislovodsk, Stavropol Krai, Russia

Climate chart (precipitation, max. and min. temperature)
J	F	M	A	M	J	J	A	S	O	N	D
1.6 34 17	1.6 35 18	3.2 41 24	3.9 51 33	5.2 59 42	5.5 66 50	4.1 70 55	3 71 55	3.4 63 47	3.1 54 38	1.9 44 28	1.7 37 20
- █ Average max. and min. temperatures in °F
- █ Precipitation totals in inches
- Source: world-climates.com
Metric conversion
J	F	M	A	M	J	J	A	S	O	N	D
41 1 −8	41 2 −8	81 5 −5	99 10 0	132 15 6	140 19 10	104 21 13	76 22 13	86 17 9	79 12 4	48 7 −2	43 3 −6
- █ Average max. and min. temperatures in °C
- █ Precipitation totals in mm

== Plants and animals ==
There are many gardens in the park, particularly in the lower parts near town, but more natural forests in the higher elevations. More than 250 species of trees and shrubs have been collected, including pine, beech, hornbeam, ash, maple, alder, larch, and spruce.

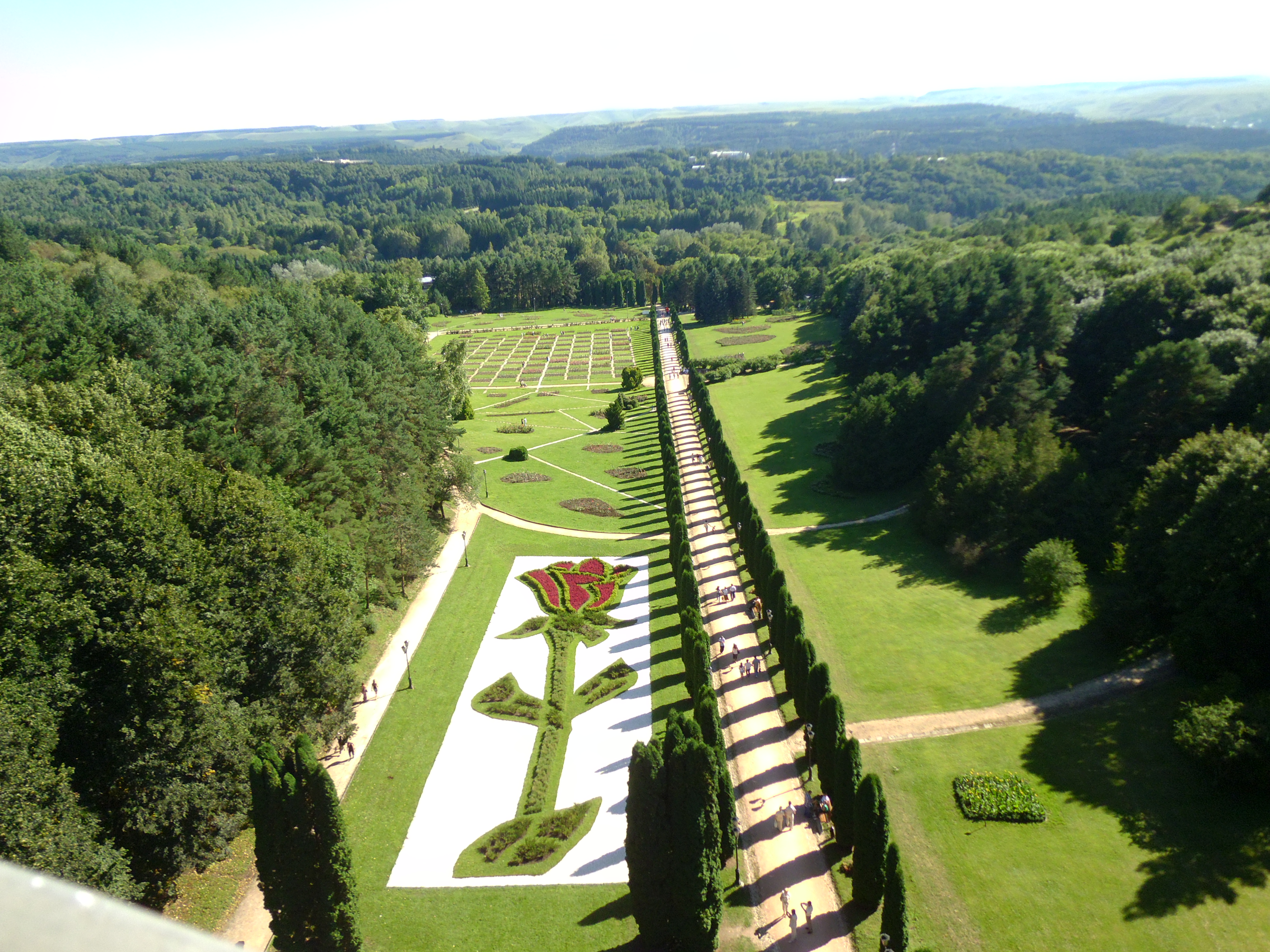
Valley of the Roses, Kislovodsk National Park

== History ==
The city of Kivlovodsk was formed in 1803 as a military fort to protect visitors to the medicinal springs, and the park itself was begun in 1827 when soldiers planted a promenade of Linden trees. The urban park was elevated to the status of national park in 2016, with the objectives of preserving the natural environment, preserving historical and cultural sites, providing for environmental education, and regulating tourism and recreation.

== Tourism ==
As an urban park, the emphasis is on broad public spaces (promenades, gazebos, gardens), long walking paths, and scenic observation decks on the hilltops. The lower park, in town, features a visitor center with museum and nature exhibits, and a "drinking gallery" where visitors can sample three different types of mineral waters. The middle park features exercise facilities, hiking paths, and memorial gardens. The upper park features a cable car, and hiking trails to various hilltop observation decks. There are cafes and restaurants in the park, and hotels in the surrounding town.

== See also ==
- Protected areas of Russia
