= Buzuluksky Bor National Park =

National park in Samara and Orenburg Oblasts, Russia

- Бузулукский бор (Russian)
- IUCN category II (national park)
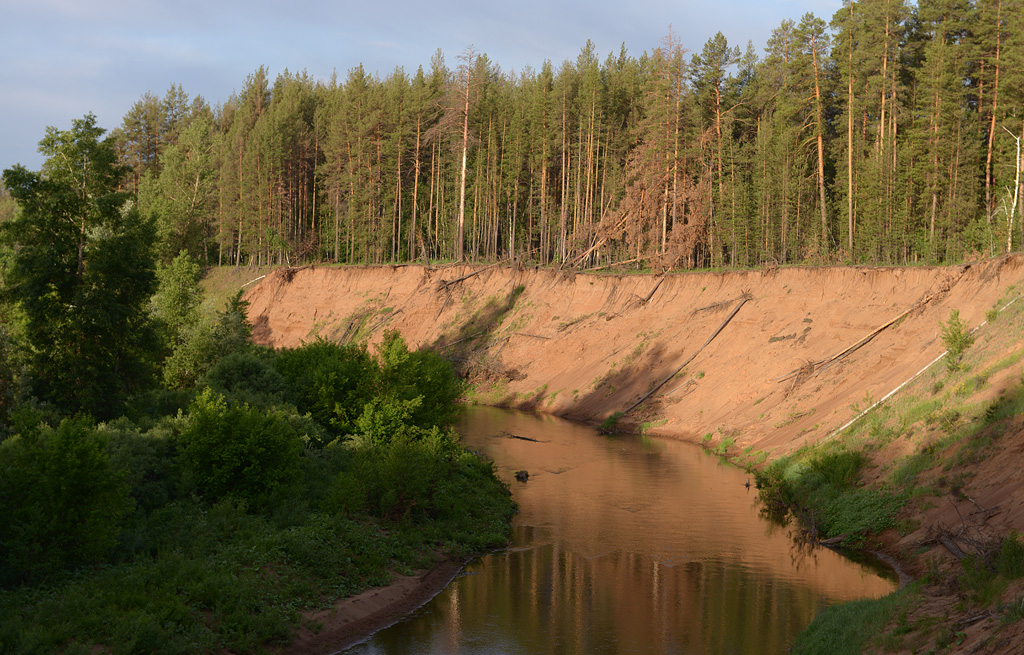
- Borovka River in Buzuluk forest

- Location within Russia
- Location: Samara Oblast and Orenburg Oblast
- Nearest city: Samara
- Coordinates: 53°00′N 52°07′E
- Area: 106,000 hectares (261,932 acres; 1,060 km^{2}; 409 sq mi)
- Governing body: Ministry of Natural Resources and Environment (Russia)

Buzuluksky Bor National Park (Russian: Бузулукский бор) encompasses the Buzuluk Pine Forest, which is the largest grove of isolated high pine trees in the world. It is surrounded by steppes on the East European Plain east of the Volga River and west of the foothills running up to the southern Urals. This makes it an important habitat for scientific study, and is the site of the earliest forest management area in Russia. It is about 70 miles east from the city of Samara, Russia, and 15 km north of the town of Buzuluk, Orenburg Oblast.

About 106,000 hectares (261,932 acres) in size, Buzuluksky is a triangular patch of forest measuring roughly 53 km North-South, and 34 km West-East. It straddles the border of Samara Oblast (Region) and Orenburg Oblast (Region), with approximately half of its area in each. The park was officially constituted as a National Park in 2007, but has been a forestry management area since the early 1800s.

== Topography ==
The park is bounded on the south by the Samara River, and on the other sides by non-forested steppes. The pine stand is surrounded by a thin band of broadleaf trees. The Borovka River flows southwest through the middle of the forest before emptying into the Samara at its southern end. The resultant river valley is about 100 meters in depth below the surrounding terrain. The sandy floodplain above the Borovka valley contains creeks and oxbow lakes. The Buzuluk pine stand occupies a large hollow filled with sandy sediments of marine genesis overlain by alluvial sands. The depth of the sands reaches 90 meters. At some points the river banks are made of red sandstones, conglomerates and mudstones of the Permian and Lower Triassic.

== Ecoregion and climate ==
The park is in the Pontic–Caspian steppe ecoregion, which is characterized by a Temperate grasslands, savannas, and shrublands biome. The forest itself is thus out of character for the surrounding areas, with a forest canopy of conifers and deciduous trees.

The climate is continental with hot summers and cold winters (Koppen BSk - Cold Semi-Arid Climates). This climate has large differences between the mean annual air temperature in winter (-13,8 °C in January) and summer (+20,4 °C in July). The average precipitation is 530 mm per year. The average length of snow cover is 169 days under the forest canopy, typically running from mid-November to mid-April.

Surrounded by dry steppes, the forest creates a special mesoclimate in the area around it. Studies show that surrounding region experiences cooler temperatures, wetter soil, more variety of vegetation, and a greater covering by small groves of trees. These effects occur up to 20 km from the forest edge.

== History ==
The forest was created by wind and water over the sand dunes of the ancient Caspian Sea, beginning several hundred thousand years ago. The area may have been the mouth of a larger river that flowed into the Caspian until the sea receded. Even today the forest overlays shifting sand dunes up to 30 m in depth. Until the early 1800s the area had extensive bogs and marshes which have been replaced by forest. A forestry management center was established in the early 1900s, and extensive experiments have been conducted in forestation of steppe environments since that time.

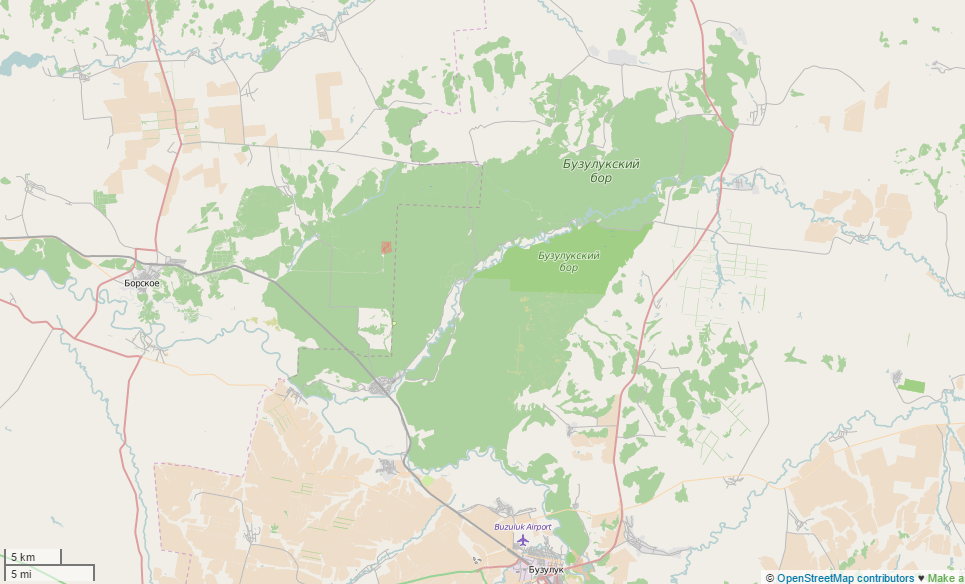
Green Area shows Buzuluksky National Park

== Tourism and use ==
There are hiking trails throughout the park, and areas from group meetings and camping in designated places. A museum displays historical and natural exhibits. The park's governmental charter emphasizes the protection of the habitat. Development is prohibited - no resource extraction, construction of building, trunk roads, disturbing of the geological or hydrological features. Hunting and fishing are prohibited, as are non-official motorized vehicles. Pets must remain on the common paths or designated areas.

== Animals ==
The animal community of Buzuluksky reflects the combination of forest, steppe, and wetland habitats in close connection. The variety and quantity of plants support 55 mammal species -from the rodents such as squirrels and hamsters, to the smaller forest-dwelling animals (wolf, fox, badger, sandy, pine marten, ferret steppe, mink, ermine, weasel), up to large ungulates (moose, elk, wild boar, roe deer), and predators (including wolves that migrate through). One of the most valued animals is the badger, which each large numbers of larvae that are pests to the pine trees. Beaver re-appeared in the 1980s, and have built dams in the rivers and floodplain lakes. There are seven species of bats in the park, which feed on the forest insects and, like many birds, migrate away during the winter months.

There are 155 different species of birds present, including birds of prey (owls, hawks and others) which feed on the rodents. Reflecting the various micro-haitats, there are waterfowl, forest birds, and bush nesters.

== Recent events ==
The park comes under stress from the effects of recurrent drought, which dries the trees and creates favorable conditions for pine infestations. A wind-storm in 2010 felled almost 10% of the pine trees. In 2013, forest fires damaged more of the forest.

There is oil under the Buzuluk park. Oil extraction was conducted in the forest from the 1950s to the 1970s, when a serious accident in 1971 led to the termination of drilling. There are currently about 160 capped oil wells in the park, some of which may be leaking. Proposals to explore in the area or to conserve the wells are currently being debated.

== See also ==
National Parks of Russia
