= Kalevalsky National Park =

National park in Russia

- Калевальский (Russian)
- IUCN category II (national park)
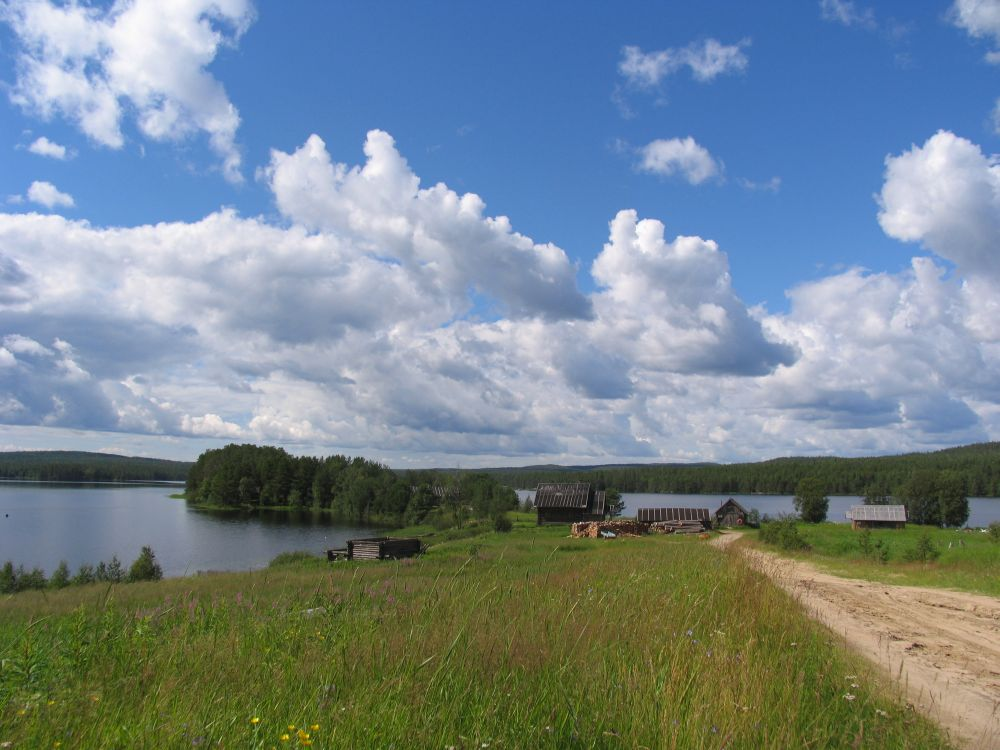
- Venehjärvi village, Sudnozero in Kalavalsky National Park

- Location within Russia
- Location: Republic of Karelia
- Nearest city: Kostomuksha
- Coordinates: 64°59′N 30°13′E
- Area: 74,400 hectares (183,846 acres; 744 km^{2}; 287 sq mi)
- Established: 2007
- Governing body: Ministry of Natural Resources and Environment (Russia)
- Website: MNRR site

Kalevalsky National Park (Russian: Калевальский) covers one of the last old-growth boreal pine forest in Europe. It is situated on the border between Russia and Finland at about the midpoint from south to north. The park is located in the Republic of Karelia, 30 km north of the town of Kostomuksha. The Kalevala, an epic poem of Finnish and Karelian oral folklore, was drawn from this region. The traditional people of the area include the Sami people and the Karelians.

== Topography ==
The territory of the park is on the southeast of the Baltic Shield, which contains the oldest rocks in Europe (3 billion year-ol Precambrian crystalline granites, gneisses, and similar), covered by a very young layer (20–30 meters) of glacial deposits. During the recent Pleistocene glaciation, heavy continental ice sheets scoured and depressed the region, leaving as they melted a flat landscape of lakes and rivers. The western portion of the park is mostly flat (and generally waterlogged) forest, while the eastern section has more hills and ridges; the altitude in the park ranges between 105 meters and 278 meters. Due to the valuable mineral profile, mining is the main industry in the area, with logging also important.

The park records 250 streams, and 400 lakes. Only about 100 of the lakes has an area greater than 10 hectares. The cover of the park is 85% forest, 9% marsh, and 6% lakes and rivers. The wetland systems are complex, and peat underlies much of the territory, in parts reaching a depth in some bogs of 6 meters. The forest are mostly pine, with about 10% spruce, and some small stands of birch and aspen on the sites of former farms.

Kalevalsky National Park borders (green), Finnish border (purple)

== Climate ==
The climate of Kalevalsky is Subarctic climate, without dry season (Köppen climate classification Subarctic climate (Dfc)). This climate is characterized by mild summers (only 1–3 months above 10 °C (50.0 °F)) and cold, snowy winters (coldest month below −3 °C (26.6 °F)). The number of days with snow cover is 170-180; the number of frost-free days is 80–95 days.

Kostomuksha, Republic of Karelia, Russia

Climate chart (precipitation, max. and min. temperature)
J	F	M	A	M	J	J	A	S	O	N	D
1.3 15 1	1.1 16 1	1.2 27 10	1.3 38 22	1.7 51 34	2.5 63 46	2.8 67 51	3 62 48	2.5 51 39	2.1 38 30	2 27 18	1.5 19 7
- █ Average max. and min. temperatures in °F
- █ Precipitation totals in inches
- Source: climate-date.org
Metric conversion
J	F	M	A	M	J	J	A	S	O	N	D
33 −10 −17	28 −9 −17	30 −3 −12	33 3 −6	43 11 1	64 17 8	71 20 11	76 17 9	64 10 4	53 4 −1	51 −3 −8	38 −7 −14
- █ Average max. and min. temperatures in °C
- █ Precipitation totals in mm

== Ecoregion ==
The terrestrial ecoregion of Kalevansky is Scandinavian and Russian taiga (WWF ID#608), a region characterized by coniferous forests taiga. The freshwater ecoregion is classified as "Barents Sea Drainages" (FEOW ID#407), characterized by migratory species, low levels of endemism, and high numbers of species introduced by humans. FEOW notes that "The fish fauna is formed from immigrants of Atlantic and Siberian origins with only a weak assemblage of primary freshwater European species; thus, a "mixed" nature of the fish fauna is its main distinguishing feature".

== See also ==
- Protected areas of Russia
- Republic of Karelia
