= Koygorodsky National Park =

National park of Russia

- (Russian: Койгородский)
- IUCN category II (national park)
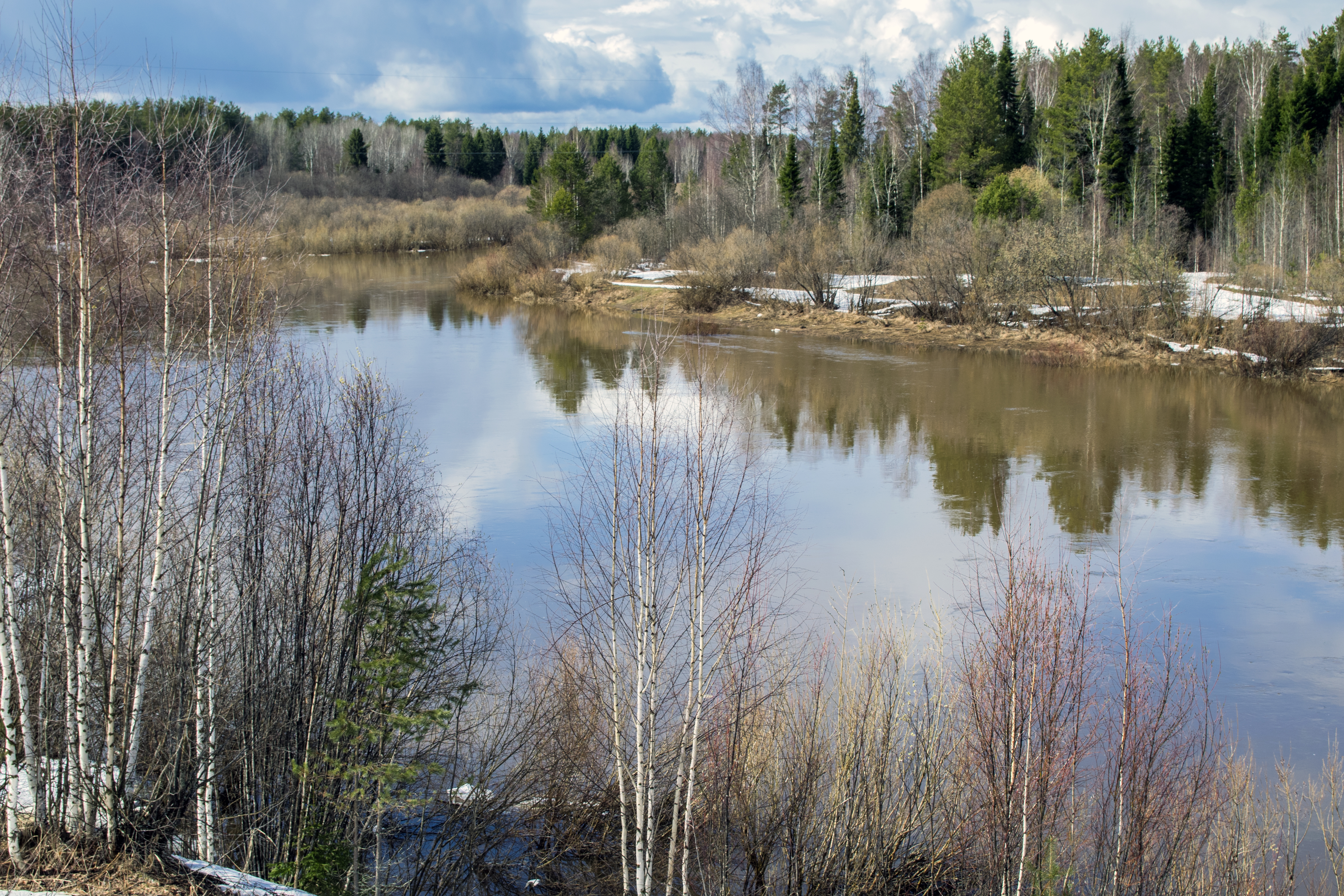
- Letka river inside Koygorodsky National Park

- Location within Russia
- Location: Komi Republic
- Nearest city: Syktyvkar
- Coordinates: 59°48′N 49°48′E
- Area: 56,700 hectares (140,109 acres; 567 km^{2}; 219 sq mi)
- Established: July 12, 2019
- Governing body: FGBU "Koygorodsky"
- Website: https://koygorodskiy.ru/

Koygorodsky National Park (Russian: Национальный парк «Койгородский») covers one of the largest expanses of virgin southern taiga in Europe. It is located on the eastern edge of the East European Plain, in the Komi Republic of Russia. Biodiversity is high in the mature forests, which include mature Spruce and old-growth Aspen forests. The park was officially created in 2019, and by 2021 active scientific teams were working to inventory the flora and fauna of the area. It is located in Koygorodsky District and Priluzsky District of the Komi Republic, 900 km northeast of Moscow.

== Topography ==
The terrain is flat with meandering floodplains; the highest and lowest points differ in elevation by only 50 meters. Because precipitation is higher than evaporation, water collects on the ground and runs off in a network of rivers and lakes. The Sedka River runs north from the park, eventually to the White Sea, while other small rivers flow south into rivers feeding Caspian Sea. The park is on the southern edge of the Komi Republic, on the border with Kirov Oblast, adjacent to the Nurgush-Tulashor nature reserve which provides a large additional protected zone.

== Ecoregion and climate ==
The park is located in the eastern reach of the Scandinavian and Russian taiga ecoregion. The climate of the ecoregion is Subarctic climate, without dry season (Köppen climate classification Subarctic climate (Dfc)). This climate is characterized by mild summers (only 1-3 months above 10 °C (50.0 °F)) and cold, snowy winters (coldest month below −3 °C (26.6 °F)).

Syktyvkar, Komi Republic, Russia

Climate chart (precipitation, max. and min. temperature)
J	F	M	A	M	J	J	A	S	O	N	D
0 12 0	0 17 3	0.2 30 13	1.1 43 26	2.3 56 37	3 67 48	2.8 71 52	2.9 64 47	2.1 52 39	1.4 38 29	0.4 24 15	0.1 16 5
- █ Average max. and min. temperatures in °F
- █ Precipitation totals in inches
- Source: Weatherspark.com
Metric conversion
J	F	M	A	M	J	J	A	S	O	N	D
0 −11 −18	0 −8 −16	5.1 −1 −11	28 6 −3	58 13 3	76 19 9	71 22 11	74 18 8	53 11 4	36 3 −2	10 −4 −9	2.5 −9 −15
- █ Average max. and min. temperatures in °C
- █ Precipitation totals in mm

== Plants and animals ==
The park is notable for its large stands of old-growth fern-green most spruce forests. This rare type of taiga only exists where logging and human activity have been absent for long periods. The park also includes areas of old-growth Aspen. According to the Digital Observatory for Protected Areas, over 99% of the land in the park has forest cover. The forest has not been fragmented, there are no settlements and roads cover only 1%.

118 species of birds are known to the park, with 14 of those species being critically endangered, vulnerable or near-threatened, including the Yellow-breasted bunting and the vulnerable Greater spotted eagle. Mammals of conservation interest include the near-threatened Eurasian otter (Lutra lutra) and the Pond bat (Myotis dasycneme). A common inhabitant of the wet area is the Siberian salamander (Salamandrella keyserlingii).

== See also ==
- Protected areas of Russia
