= Transbaikal Bald Mountain tundra =

Ecoregion in Russia

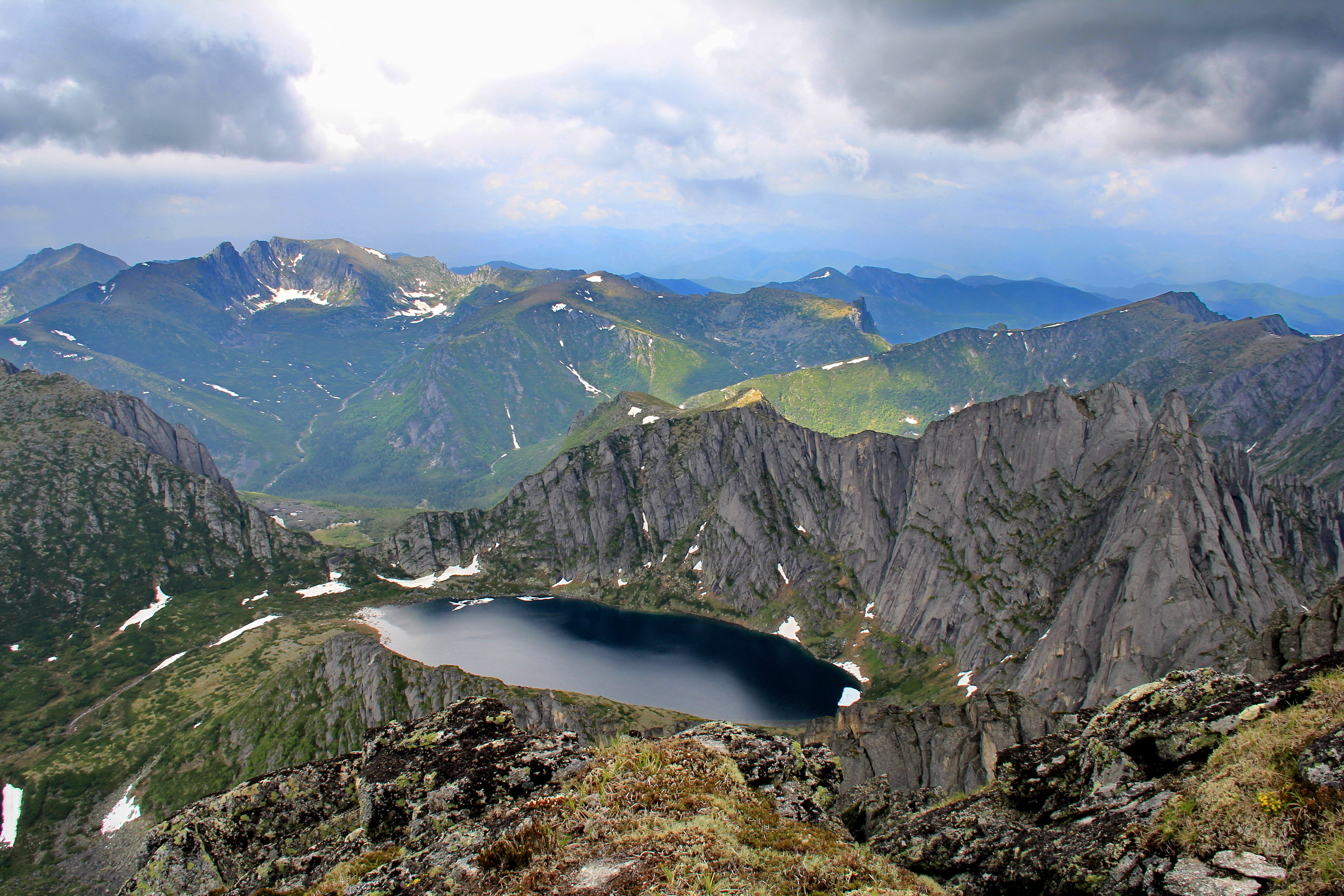
- High peaks in Bureya Nature Reserve

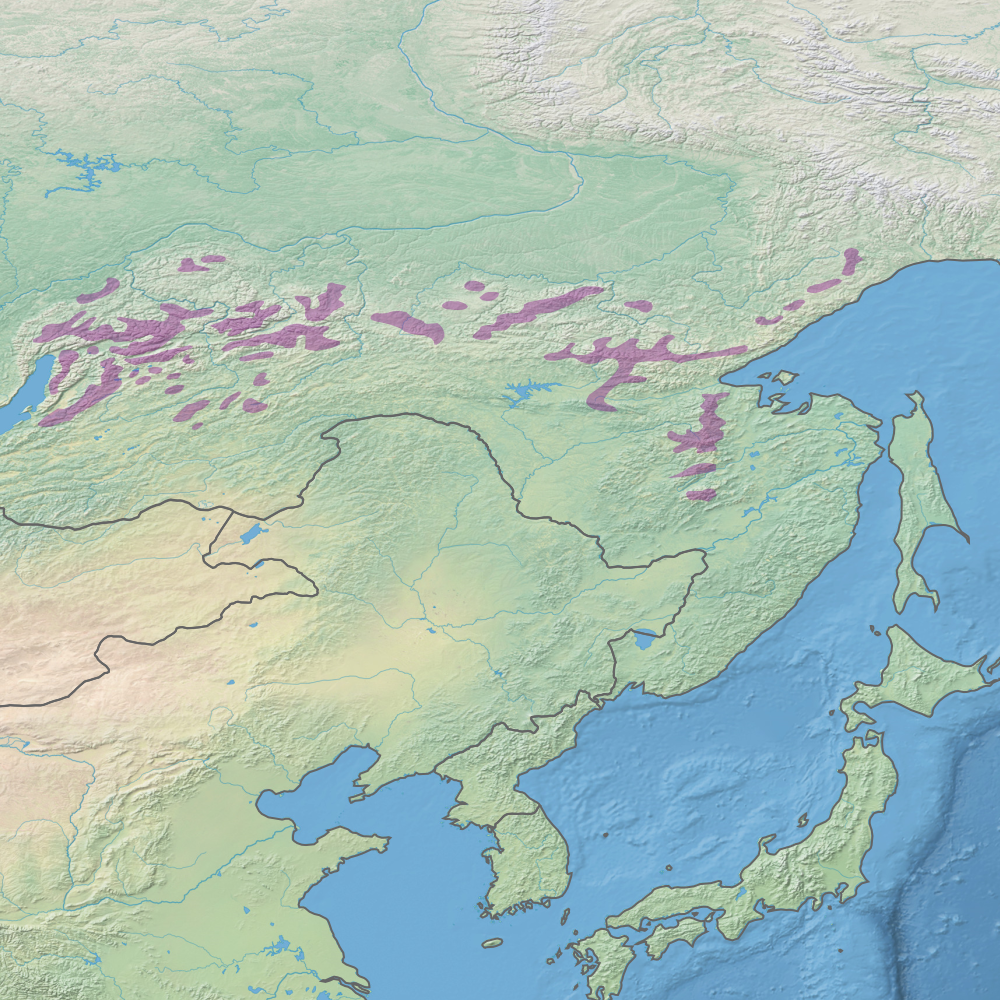
- Ecoregion territory (in purple)

Ecology
- Realm: Palearctic
- Biome: tundra

Geography
- Area: 217,559 km^{2} (84,000 sq mi)
- Countries: Russia
- Coordinates: 55.75°N 122.25°E

The Transbaikal Bald Mountain tundra ecoregion (WWF ID: PA1112) covers the high-altitude peak zones above the treeline in a series of mountain ranges that stretch from the northern reaches of Lake Baikal to the western coastal ranges of the Okhotsk Sea. Floral communities are those of mountain tundra, with bare rock or permafrost under layers of moss and lichen. Because the ecoregion is aligned along a common latitude, it acts as a route for the transmission of species across Siberia. The ecoregion is in the Palearctic realm and the tundra biome. It has an area of 217,559 square kilometres (84,000 sq mi).

== Location and description ==
The ecoregion stretches almost 1,800 km from west to east, forming a patchwork of sections that are mostly above 975 metres (3,199 ft) in a series of mountain ranges from Lake Baikal to the Okhotsk Sea. This string of high-altitude zones roughly follows 56 degrees north latitude, and much of the tundra climate is due to altitude zoning. The individual mountain ranges include the Stanovoy Range and the Dzhugdzhur Mountains. The highest elevation is 2,700 metres (8,900 ft).

== Climate ==
The region has a Subarctic climate (Koppen classification Dwc). This climate is characterized by high variation in temperature, both daily and seasonally; with long, cold winters and short, cool summers with no month averaging over 22 °C (72 °F); and with low levels of precipitation throughout the year. Mean precipitation in the Transbaikal bald mountain tundra region is about 121 mm/year. The mean temperature at the center of the ecoregion in January is −31.5 °C (−24.7 °F), and 15.8 °C (60.4 °F) in July.

== Flora and fauna ==
In general, the high peaks are bare rock at their highest, most windswept points. At lower elevations, moss and lichen form mats on the thin soil and permafrost. Mammals in this zone include marmots, moose, and musk deer.

== Protections ==
There are several significant nationally protected area that reach into this ecoregion:

- Vitim Nature Reserve, northeast of Lake Baikal, in the Kodar Mountains,
- Bureya Nature Reserve, north of the Bureya Range, with high peaks and lakes that feed the lower Amur River, and
- Dzhugdzur Nature Reserve, on the far eastern edge of the ecoregion, and which transitions into the East Siberian taiga ecoregion at lower elevations.
