= Protected areas of Russia =

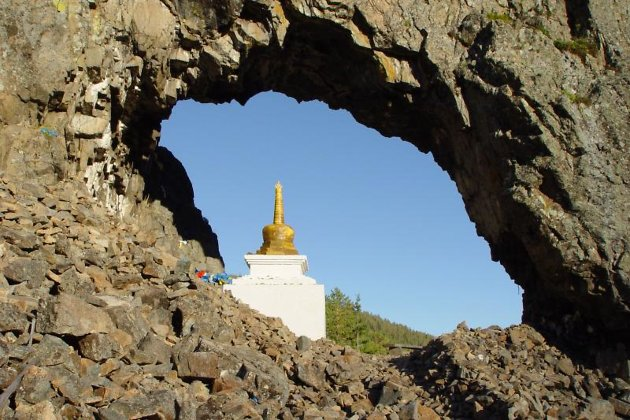
"Temple Gate" Rock formation at Alkhanay National Park

The status of the protected areas of Russia, (official Russian title: Russian: Особо охраняемые природные территории, literally "Specially Protected Natural Areas") is governed by the corresponding 1995 law of the Russian Federation.

== Categories ==
The law establishes the following categories of protected areas:

1. State nature zapovedniks, including Biosphere reserves (biosphere preserve)
2. National Parks
3. Nature parks
4. State nature zakazniks
5. Natural Monuments
6. Dendrological parks and botanical gardens
7. Health recuperation areas and health resorts

=== Other areas ===
Other areas that are protected in Russia include:

- UNESCO World Heritage Sites.
- city and regional parks.
- Ramsar sites — wetlands of international significance.
- Russian Cultural heritage monuments.
- Historic buildings and gardens — e.g.: Imperial Russian palaces and their landscape parks.

== Total land area ==
On May 21, 2019, the Moscow Times cited a World Wildlife Fund report indicating that Russia now ranks first in the world for its amount of protected natural areas with 63.3 million hectares of specially protected natural areas. However, the article did not contain a link to WWF's report and it may be based on previously gathered data.

== See also ==
- List of national parks of Russia
- List of zapovedniks of Russia
- Territory of Traditional Natural Resource Use
