= List of extreme points of Mongolia =

This is a list of the extreme points and extreme elevations in Mongolia.

Extreme points of Mongolia (approximate)

== Extreme points ==
Heading	Location	Administrative entity	Bordering entity	Coordinates (Note: Coordinates obtained from Google Earth. Google Earth makes use of the WGS84 geodetic reference system.)
North	Across from the eastern border of Tuva to the northwest of the Darkhad valley.	Tsagaannuur, Khövsgöl	Russia	52.148362°N 98.913419°E
South	In Gobi Small A National Park	Nomgon, Ömnögovi	Inner Mongolia, China	41.581958°N 105.006641°E
East	In Numrug National Park	Khalkhgol, Dornod Province	Inner Mongolia, China	46.802847°N 119.979018°E
West	In Altai Tavan Bogd National Park	Tsengel, Bayan-Ölgii	Xinjiang, China	47.70185°N 86.874897°E

== Extreme altitude ==
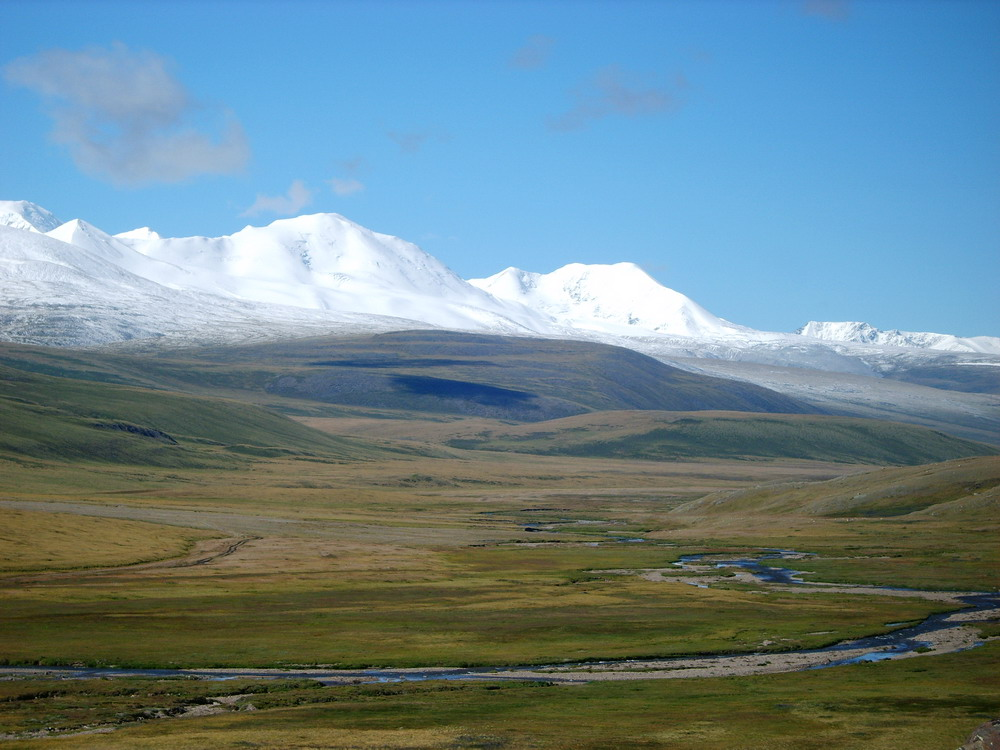
Khüiten Peak in Tsengel, Bayan-Ölgii is the highest peak in Mongolia. With a peak elevation of 4,374 metres (14,350 ft), it is part of the Altai Mountains range

Extremity	Name	Altitude	Location	Province/Territory	Coordinates
Highest	Khüiten Peak	4,374 m (14,350 ft)	Border between Bayan-Ölgii and Xinjiang	Bayan-Ölgii	49.145833°N 87.818889°E
Lowest	Khukh Lake	560 m (1,837.3 ft)	Choibalsan	Dornod Province	49.499°N 115.576°E

== See also ==
- Geography of Mongolia
- Extreme points of Asia
