= Üzemchin Mongols =

- Territories of the Üzemchin in 1911

Regions with significant populations
- China: Unknown
- Mongolia: 2,577

Languages
- Mongolian

Religion
- Tibetan Buddhism, Shamanism, Atheism

Related ethnic groups
- Mongols, Mongols in China

The Üzemchin (Mongolian: ᠦᠵᠦᠮᠦᠴᠢᠨ; Үзэмчин; simplified Chinese: 乌珠穆沁部; traditional Chinese: 烏珠穆沁部), also written Ujumchin, Ujumucin or Ujimqin, are a subgroup of Mongols in eastern Mongolia and Inner Mongolia. They are settled mainly in Sergelen, Bayantu'men, and Choibalsan city of Dornod Province and in the Xilin Gol League of Inner Mongolia. Some Üzemchins in Mongolia migrated there from Xilin Gol immediately after China was freed from the Japanese in 1945.

The Üzemchin were included in the Chahar tumen, one of the six tumen of eastern Mongols in Northern Yuan Dynasty. The land of Ongon-Dural, the third son of Bodi Alagh Khan of the Northern Yuan, was called Üzemchin. The name probably originates from Mongolian: үзэм, romanized: üzem, lit. 'grape, raisin' and means "grape pickers/collectors."

The Üzemchin language is a dialect of Chakhar Mongolian.

== See also ==
- East Ujimqin Banner
- West Ujimqin Banner
