= Choibalsan =

- Simplified Chinese: 乔巴山
Transcriptions

Choibalsan (Mongolian: Чойбалсан) may refer to:

- Khorloogiin Choibalsan, a former communist leader in Mongolia
- Choibalsan (city), a city in eastern Mongolia
- Choibalsan Airport, the airport of Choibalsan (city)
- Choibalsan District, a sum (district) in Dornod province in Mongolia
