= Choibalsan Thermal Power Plant =

Coal-fired power plant in Choibalsan, Dornod, Mongolia

- Official name: Чойбалсангийн Дулааны Цахилгаан Станц
- Country: Mongolia
- Location: Choibalsan, Dornod
- Coordinates: 48°04′44.9″N 114°33′16.3″E
- Status: Operational
- Commission date: 1969

Thermal power station
- Primary fuel: Coal
- Turbine technology: Steam turbine
- Cogeneration?: yes

The Choibalsan Thermal Power Plant (Mongolian: Чойбалсангийн Дулааны Цахилгаан Станц) is a coal-fired cogeneration power station in Choibalsan, Dornod Province, Mongolia.

== History ==
The power station was commissioned in 1969. In March 2019, a call for tender for the power generation capacity expansion of the power station by 50 MW from the existing 36 MW was held. The new 50 MW generation unit was commissioned on 6 June 2024.

== Technical specifications ==
The power station is a cogeneration type. It has a heat supply capacity of 384 GJ/h and annual heat generation of 1,460 TJ in 2020.

== See also ==
- List of power stations in Mongolia
