= Yakhi Lake =

Lake in Dornod, Mongolia

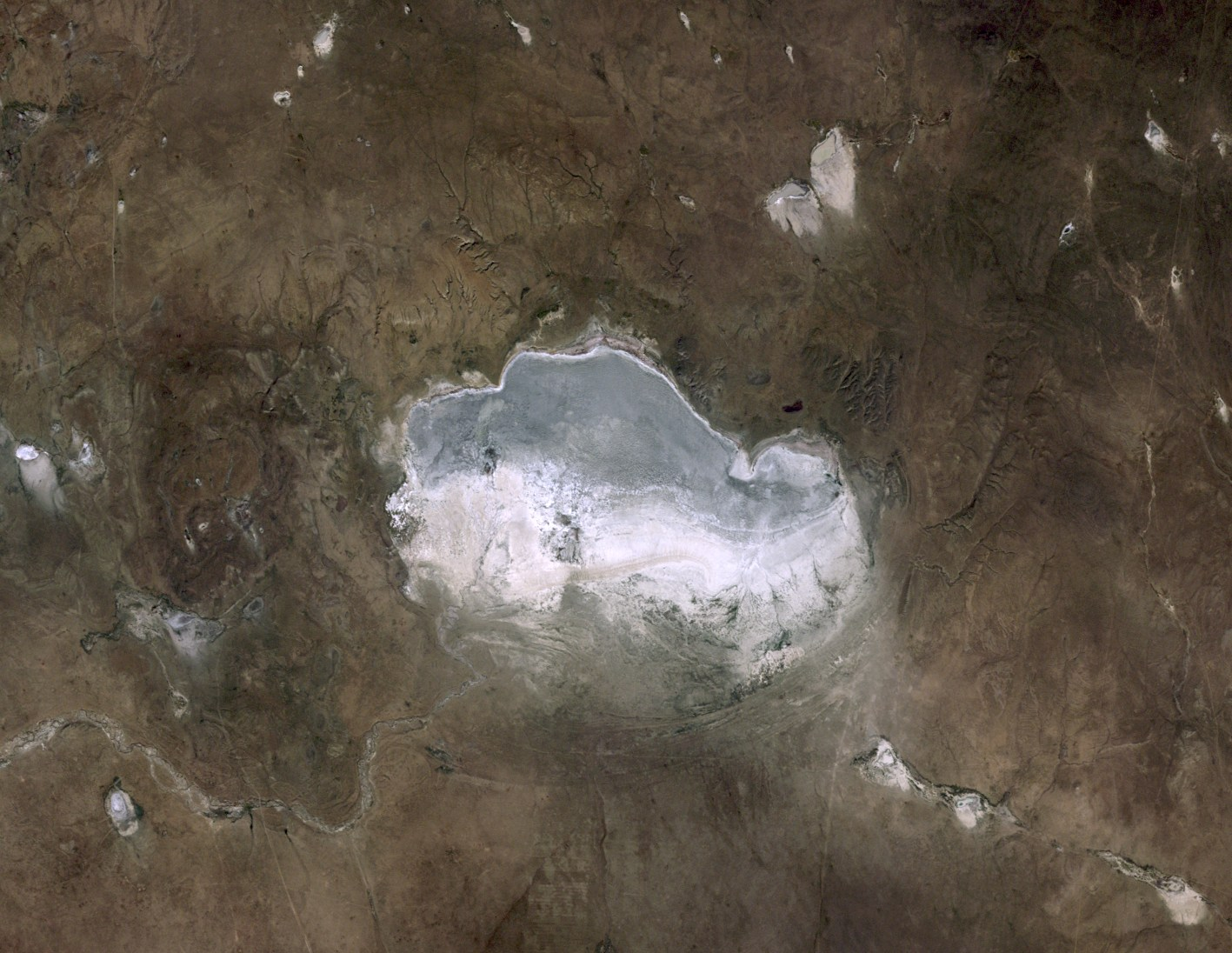

- Location within Mongolia
- Location: Dornod Province
- Coordinates: 48°38′34″N 114°26′11″E
- Basin countries: Mongolia
- Max. length: 20.4 km (12.7 mi)
- Max. width: 11.9 km (7.4 mi)
- Surface area: 97 km^{2} (37 sq mi)
- Average depth: 2.3 m (7 ft 7 in)
- Max. depth: 4 m (13 ft)
- Water volume: 0.223 km^{3} (181,000 acre⋅ft)
- Surface elevation: 670 m (2,200 ft)

Yakhi Lake (Mongolian: Яхь нуур) is a lake located in the district of Choibalsan and Sergelen, in Dornod Province, Mongolia.

It is located at an altitude of 670 m, is 20.4 km long and 11.9 km wide and has an area of 97 km^{2}. It has a maximum depth of 4 m.
