= Chimediin Saikhanbileg =

Prime Minister of Mongolia from 2014 to 2016

- Чимэдийн Сайханбилэг
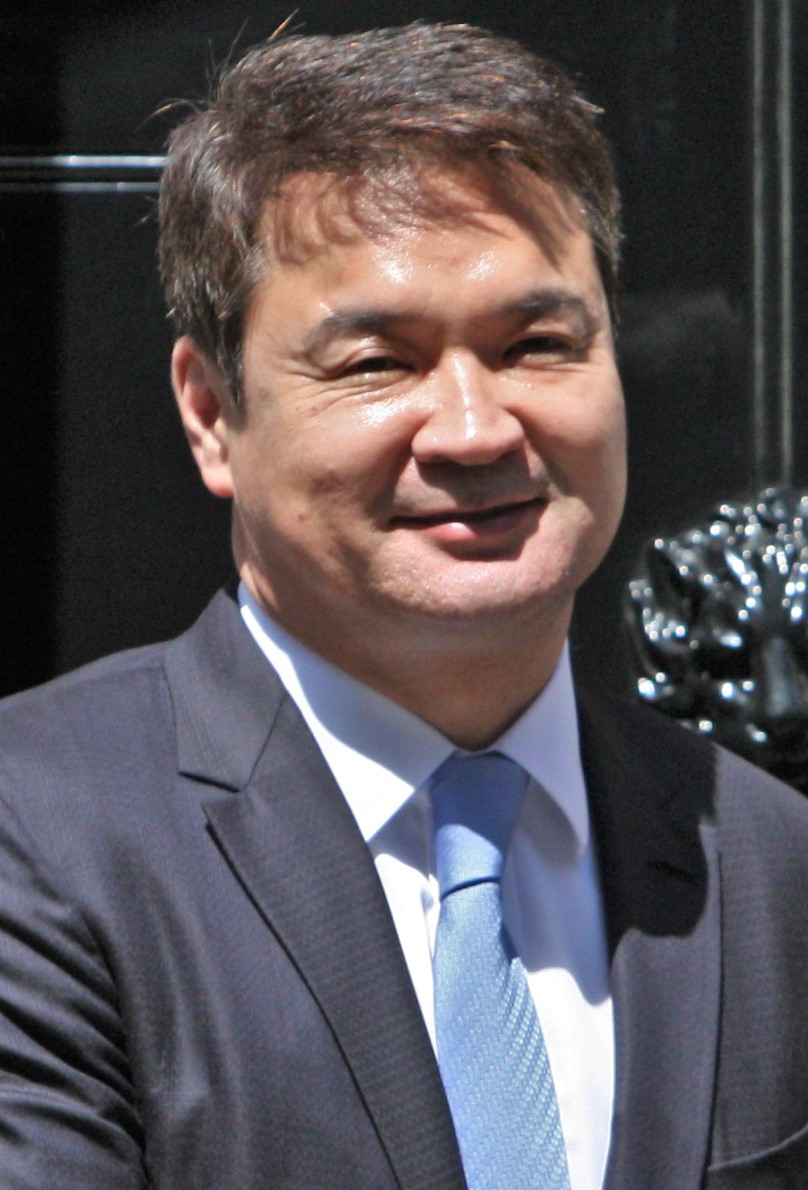
- Saikhanbileg in 2015

28th Prime Minister of Mongolia
- In office 21 November 2014 – 7 July 2016
- President: Tsakhiagiin Elbegdorj
- Deputy: Ukhnaagiin Khürelsükh; Tserendashiin Oyuunbaatar
- Preceded by: Norovyn Altankhuyag
- Succeeded by: Jargaltulgyn Erdenebat

Member of the State Great Khural
- In office 1996–2000
- Constituency: 68th, Songino Khairkhan
- In office 2008–2016
- Constituency: Closed list (2012–2016); 22nd, Bayanzurkh, Nalaikh (2008–2012)
Ministerial offices
Minister of Enlightenment
In office April 1998 – 9 December 1998
Prime Minister	Tsakhiagiin Elbegdorj
Preceded by	Chultemiin Lkhagvajav
Succeeded by	Avirmediin Battur
Chief Cabinet Secretary and Minister of Mongolia
In office August 2012 – November 2014
Prime Minister	Norovyn Altankhuyag
Preceded by	Chimediin Khurelbaatar
Succeeded by	Jamyangiin Mönkhbat

President of the Mongolian Youth Federation
- In office 1997–2002

Personal details
- Born: 17 February 1969 (age 57) Bayantümen, Dornod, Mongolia
- Party: Democratic Party (since 2000)
- Spouse: O.Baigal
- Children: 3
- Education: National University of Mongolia; Moscow University for the Humanities (BA); George Washington University Law School (MA)

Chimediin Saikhanbileg (Mongolian: Чимэдийн Сайханбилэг; born 17 February 1969) is a Mongolian politician who served as the 28th Prime Minister of Mongolia from 2014 to 2016, and whose work and career are associated with the political, economic, and mining sectors of Mongolia. A member of the Democratic Party, he was elected as a member of the State Great Khural (parliament) in 1996, 2008, and 2012. In his early political years, he was appointed to the first cabinet of Tsakhiagiin Elbegdorj as minister of education in 1998. Saikhanbileg later became the Chief Cabinet Secretary for the cabinet of Norovyn Altankhuyag in 2012. He served in this role until the resignation of Altankhuyag and his subsequent appointment as prime minister in 2014.

At the start of his tenure, Mongolia's mining-reliant economy had been experiencing an economic downturn due to falling commodity prices and sharp decline in foreign direct investment. His cabinet primarily focused on dealing with the country's economic issues. In an effort to relieve the economy, Saikhanbileg's cabinet notably oversaw the finalization of Oyu Tolgoi mine project's two-year stalled investment deal with Rio Tinto in 2015 and purchase of Russia's 49% stake in Erdenet Mining Corporation in 2016. These decisions were met with domestic controversy and criticism, especially from the Mongolian People's Party (MPP). Saikhanbileg and notable other Democratic leaders were unseated in 2016, when the party lost to the MPP. Saikhanbileg was briefly arrested by corruption probes in 2018 and has been residing in the United States since 2019.

== Early life and education ==
Saikhanbileg was born on 17 February 1969, as the second of 4 children of Chimed, on the morning of the first day of Tsagaan Sar, in Bayantümen district of Dornod Province, the easternmost province of Mongolia. His father, Chimed, and mother, Orolmaa Alag, were both engineers. His father oversaw the construction of new industrial, cultural, and residential buildings, and the new airport built by the Russian Construction Company in Ulaanbaatar, the capital of Mongolia, greatly contributed to the development of the city's modern image and appearance. His mother, Orolmaa, personally carried out the technical work of developing film for all Mongolian feature films from the early 1960s to the mid-1990s.

Saikhanbileg attended the 45th secondary school in Ulaanbaatar between 1976 and 1986. During his school years, he was a socially active student, serving as a board member of the children's organization of all schools in the capital. In 1983, he organized and supervised the largest Mongolian children's assembly, the 5th Annual Inheritor Conference. He also worked at the Mongolian National Broadcaster as a host of children's shows.

After graduating from secondary school, Saikhanbileg went to Moscow to study history at Moscow University for the Humanities from 1986 to 1991 and received a bachelor's degree in History and History Education.

When working for the Mongolian Youth Federation, Mongolia's largest youth NGO, Saikhanbileg studied law and received his Bachelor of Law degree from the School of Law of the Mongolian National University in 1995. After his full-term service as a member of parliament, Saikhanbileg spent a year in Boulder, Colorado, at the University of Colorado Economics Institute from 2000 to 2001 and subsequently completed his master's degree at the George Washington University Law School in Washington, D.C.

== Political career ==
As a young student in Moscow, Saikhanbileg witnessed Gorbachev's Perestroika and Glasnost; shortly afterwards, the fall of the Berlin Wall. As soon as he graduated from the university in 1991, he started to actively participate in the Mongolian democratic revolution and transition. At that time, the ruling Mongolian People's Revolutionary Party was influencing Mongolian youth through its largest youth organization, the Mongolian Revolutionary Youth League. Saikhanbileg initiated and implemented numerous reforms and ideas in line with the ideals and mindsets of youths, including the reorganization of this organization into the Mongolian Youth Federation (MYF), modernizing its form into that of the classical non-governmental organizations, and expelling party influence. Between 1992 and 1997, Saikhanbileg served as the secretary general of the MYF.

=== Member of Parliament (1996–2000) ===
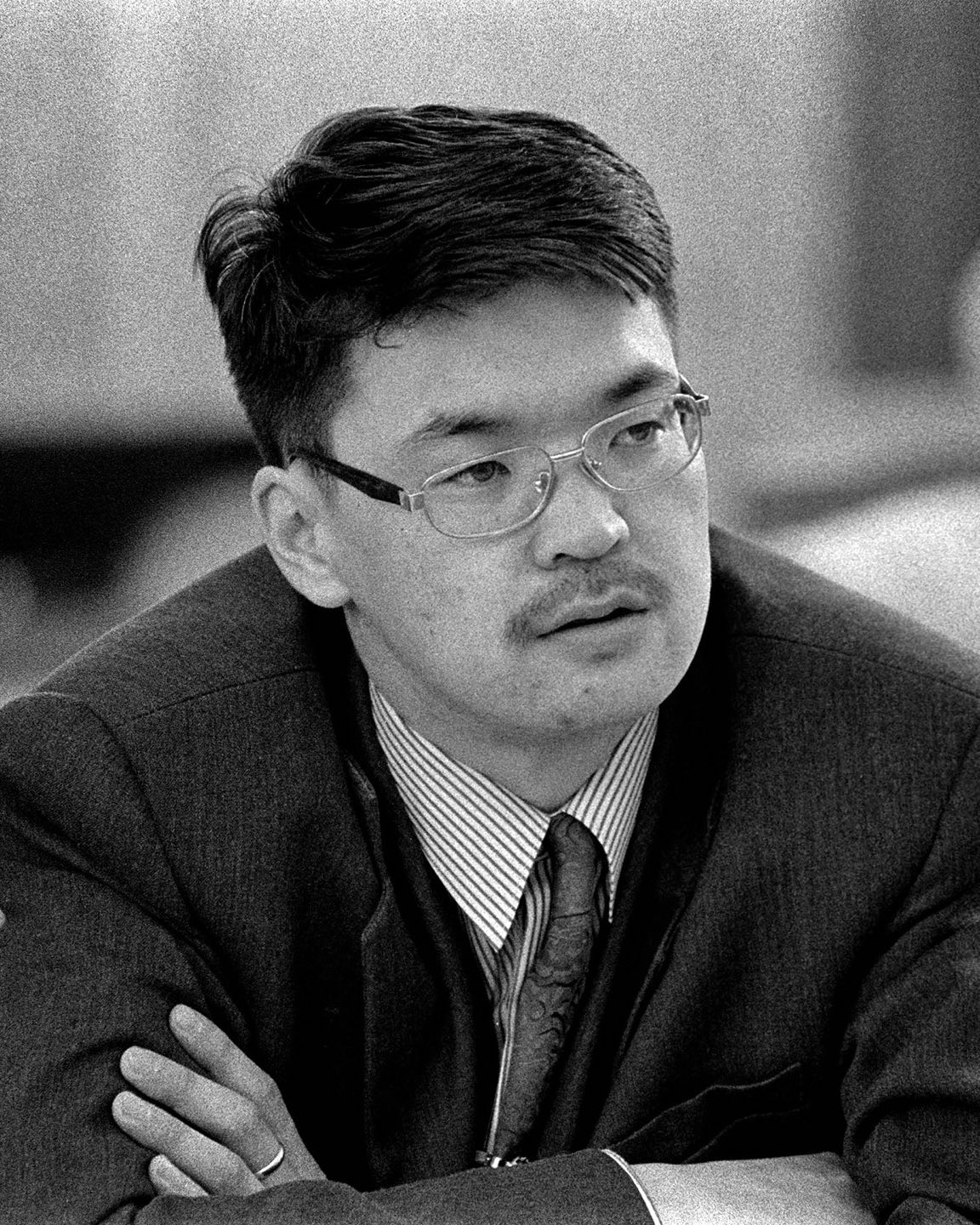
Saikhanbileg as a member of the State Great Khural in 1996.

As a member of the Democratic Union Coalition, Saikhanbileg ran and won in the 1996 parliamentary election from the 68th Songino Khairkhan district of Ulaanbaatar, becoming the youngest member of the State Great Khural at the age of 27. After his election, Saikhanbileg became President of the MYF in 1997 and served until 2002. He was one of the initiating MPs of the 2000 Constitutional Amendment. He also initiated the Law on Parliament, the Law on the Legal Status of Parliament Members, and the Law on Parliamentary Procedures, which became the basis of the contemporary core legal and regulatory system.

==== Minister of Education (1998) ====
In 1998, he was appointed Minister of Enlightenment (equivalent to an education minister) by parliament at the age of 29, also making him the youngest ministerial appointment in then contemporary Mongolian history. During his one-year tenure, Saikhanbileg reformed the higher (tertiary) education system, passed new tertiary education laws, and began an accreditation system for all universities in Mongolia. The legal basis of private schools in the education system was legalized for the first time. In addition, universities came to be governed by an independent board, and the appointment of university presidents was freed from political influence. Saikhanbileg also served as the first Chairman of the Board of the National University of Mongolia.

As Minister of Enlightenment, from the late 1990s, Saikhanbileg began the third wave of education, training Mongolian youth in the USA, Australia, the European Union, Japan, and Korea. This effort was complemented by the government's support to students through stipends, tuition loans, and aid. Additionally, he had the Law on Science and Technology approved, securing 1.5% of the annual government budget for science and technology.

Saikhanbileg studied in the United States for 2 years after being unseated in the 2000 parliamentary election. While studying at George Washington University, he conceived 2 ideas to implement in Mongolia and successfully implemented them after graduating. The first was estate planning. He established E&T Law Firm and worked there from 2002 to 2004. The second idea was to establish a secondary school in Mongolia aligned with American standards. Finding a partner and raising over US$10 million, he founded the American School of Ulaanbaatar, a private international K-12 school in Mongolia.

Saikhanbileg was appointed Chairman of the Information and Communication Technology Authority of the Mongolian Government after the 2004 Parliamentary Election, serving until 2008. Under his leadership, 2004 to 2008 was a period of rapid development in telecommunications and information technologies in Mongolia.

He oversaw and completed the construction of high-speed Internet access and fiber-optic cables in a 1.5 million km2 area of Mongolia, connecting 21 aimags and 330 soums during those years. This fiber-optic network became the first infrastructure in Mongolia to connect the entire country. Within only 4 years, a new network spanning almost 10,000 km had been built. He successfully renegotiated a 20-year contract with Korea Telecom, signed in 1995, that granted the company an exclusive right to use the central telecommunications network. Saikhanbileg was able to remove the exclusive rights, inviting fair competition to the industry. With the advent of two new cellular carriers, competition flourished, leading to a reduction in users' bills by almost 3 to 4 times. Cell phone user numbers increased to 4.3 million, representing 3 million Mongolians, making Mongolia a country with a leading mobile penetration rate. The percentage of smartphone users has grown to over 80%. At his initiative, the projects "E-Mongolia", "E-Government", "Internet for Every Family", and "A Computer for Every Child" were successfully implemented, and the total size of Internet traffic was increased by a factor of 400. The IPTV project to connect Mongolia to the main fiber-optic network linking Asia and Europe was successfully implemented, allowing users to rewind any program aired within 72 hours. E-government projects eliminated bureaucracy and red tape in government services and enabled numerous innovative services to reach the public.

=== Chief Cabinet Secretary (2012–2014) ===
In the 2012 parliamentary election, Saikhanbileg became an MP for the third time; his party won the largest number of seats in the State Great Khural and formed a coalition government headed by party chairman Norovyn Altankhuyag. Saikhanbileg was appointed Chief of the Cabinet Secretariat and Minister without portfolio. As Chief of the Cabinet Secretariat, Saikhanbileg undertook a series of important reforms to alleviate the burden of red tape on business, promote greater openness across the core of World Bank Doing Business indicators, and, within only 2 years, Mongolia advanced from the 97th to the 56th in the world ranking. Moreover, by certain indicators, Mongolia ranked among the top 20 countries.

He established a permanent 11-11 Call Center for citizens to submit complaints and feedback, introduced government service electronic machines capable of providing 34 public services, implemented reforms in the professional inspectorate, and reformed government-issued permits for businesses and citizens, lowering the number from 900 to 300.

== Prime Minister of Mongolia (2014–2016) ==
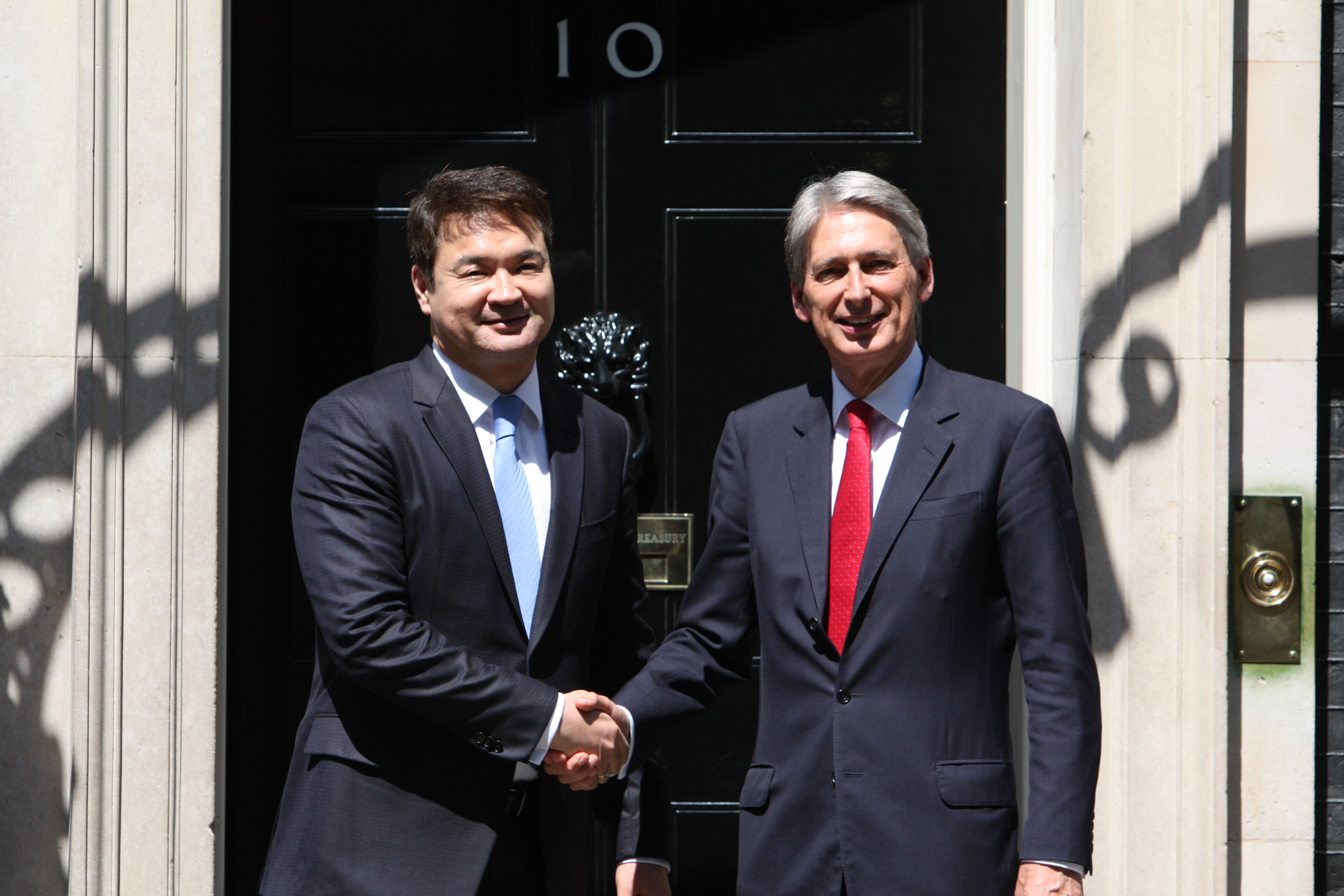
Saikhanbileg with UK foreign secretary Philip Hammond in London, July 2015

Saikhanbileg was appointed the 28th Prime Minister of Mongolia on 21 November 2014, following the resignation of Norovyn Altankhuyag on 9 November. In his address to the parliament on the day of his appointment as the country's Premier, Saikhanbileg noted: "My Government's priority will be the Economy, with the second priority being the Economy and the third – Economy."

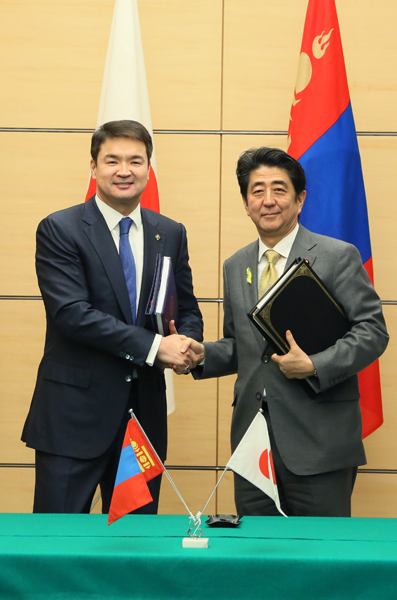
Saikhanbileg with Japanese prime minister Shinzo Abe in Tokyo, 10 February 2015

He is credited with reducing budget expenditures by MNT 2 trillion consecutively over 2 years. Collaborating with the Bank of Mongolia, he implemented "Good" programs to protect low-income segments of the population and support the middle class. Also, as a result of implementing the VAT registration system reform, cash transactions were drastically reduced, and the number of cash and cashless transaction machines increased by a factor of 4 in the first year alone. Compared with the economic performance of 2008–2009, when the country was under the same grave economic conditions and had shrunk by 1.3%, the economy under Saikhanbileg's management grew modestly by 1.3%, under the same tough economic circumstances.

Saikhanbileg, as Prime Minister, worked to attract foreign investment to Mongolia. He visited the main capital markets: London, New York, Dubai, Hong Kong, Tokyo, and Singapore; met with the leaders, businesses, and investors from those countries; organized Investment conferences in each country he visited; presented Mongolian markets and mega projects; and invited them to invest. He also visited prominent television studios such as CNBC, CNN, Bloomberg, BBC, and CCTV for live programs to speak about the political environment surrounding the Mongolian economy and investment. He met with the World Bank, IMF, IFC, Credit Suisse, EBRD, ADB, and ING, and their executives, and came up with specific solutions for investment and co-operation in Mongolia.

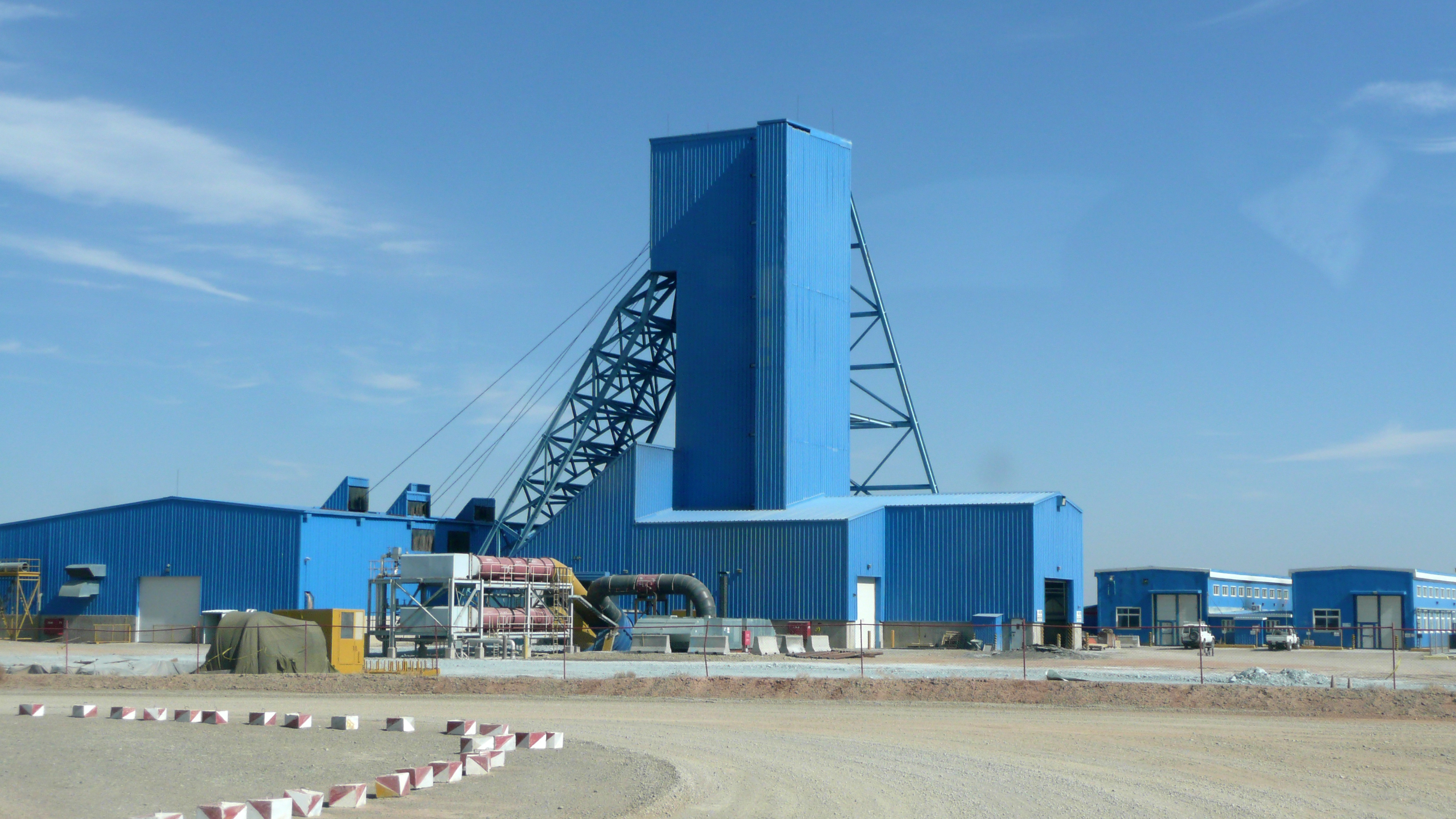
The Oyu Tolgoi mine has been a major political issue before and during Saikhanbileg's term

As a result, the two-year negotiation of the Oyu Tolgoi Underground Mine was concluded, and the decision to launch a $4.2 billion construction project was reached on 19 May 2015. Inaugurating the Oyu Tolgoi Project, Saikhanbileg said, "From now on, the OT project transforms from a controversial political matter into a business project. From now on, the matter will be settled by the members of the board and not by politicians."

On 15–16 July 2016, as prime minister, Saikhanbileg, hosted the leaders of state and government of 53 countries of Europe and Asia for the 11th Asia-Europe Meeting Summit (ASEM) in the capital city of Mongolia, Ulaanbaatar.

== Post-premiership ==
In the 2016 parliamentary election, the Democratic Party, with 9 seats, lost to the Mongolian People's Party which won a supermajority of 65 seats. Saikhanbileg and several high-ranking officials within the DP were unseated.

On 10 April 2018, Saikhanbileg alongside former prime minister Sanjiin Bayar was arrested by anti-corruption agencies when he returned from the US to cooperate with investigations into allegations of corruption and abuse of power. At the request of the corruption probe, two courts ordered that both ex-prime ministers be held for 30 days in a detention centre. In an open letter, Saikhanbileg himself denied the allegations of bribery and misuse of power. He was soon released on bail later in 2018. In 2019, he departed to Seoul and fled to the United States for medical treatment and has been residing there ever since. While he was abroad, he was charged with four charges for his role in the 2015 Oyu-tolgoi agreement and an arrest warrant was issued by the government in 2020, whom he and his lawyer state it to be a "politically motivated" charges by then-president Khaltmaagiin Battulga, who attempted to seize the judiciary in 2019.

On 13 February 2020, former DP chairman and outgoing Chief of Staff of president Battulga, Zandaakhüügiin Enkhbold, told in a press conference that former prime minister Saikhanbileg applied for an American citizenship. Saikhanbileg made his first media appearance in 2024 on the Lkhagvyn TOIM talk show. During the interview, he stated he won't become a US citizen and "will end my life as a Mongolian citizen."

== Family and personal life ==
Saikhanbileg is married and is a father of three. He met his wife, Baigal, at the Mongolian Student Festival on the shores of Lake Baikal. Saikhanbileg and Baigal married in 1993. Saikhanbileg is fluent in Mongolian, Russian, and English.

Saikhanbileg engages in powerlifting as a hobby. He was elected the President of the Mongolian Powerlifting Federation from 2010 to 2017.

Political offices
Preceded by Norovyn Altankhuyag	Prime Minister of Mongolia; 2014–2016	Succeeded by Jargaltulgyn Erdenebat
