= Sergelen =

Sergelen may refer to:

== People ==
- Sergelen Otgonbaatar (born 1989), Mongolian basketball player

== Places ==
It is the name of two sums (districts) in Mongolia:

- Sergelen, Dornod
- Sergelen, Töv
