= Bars-Hot =

City in Tsagaan-Ovoo, Dornod, Mongolia

Coordinates: 48°3′13″N 113°22′0″E

Bars Hot Kherlen Bars
- Хэрлэн Барс (Mongolian)
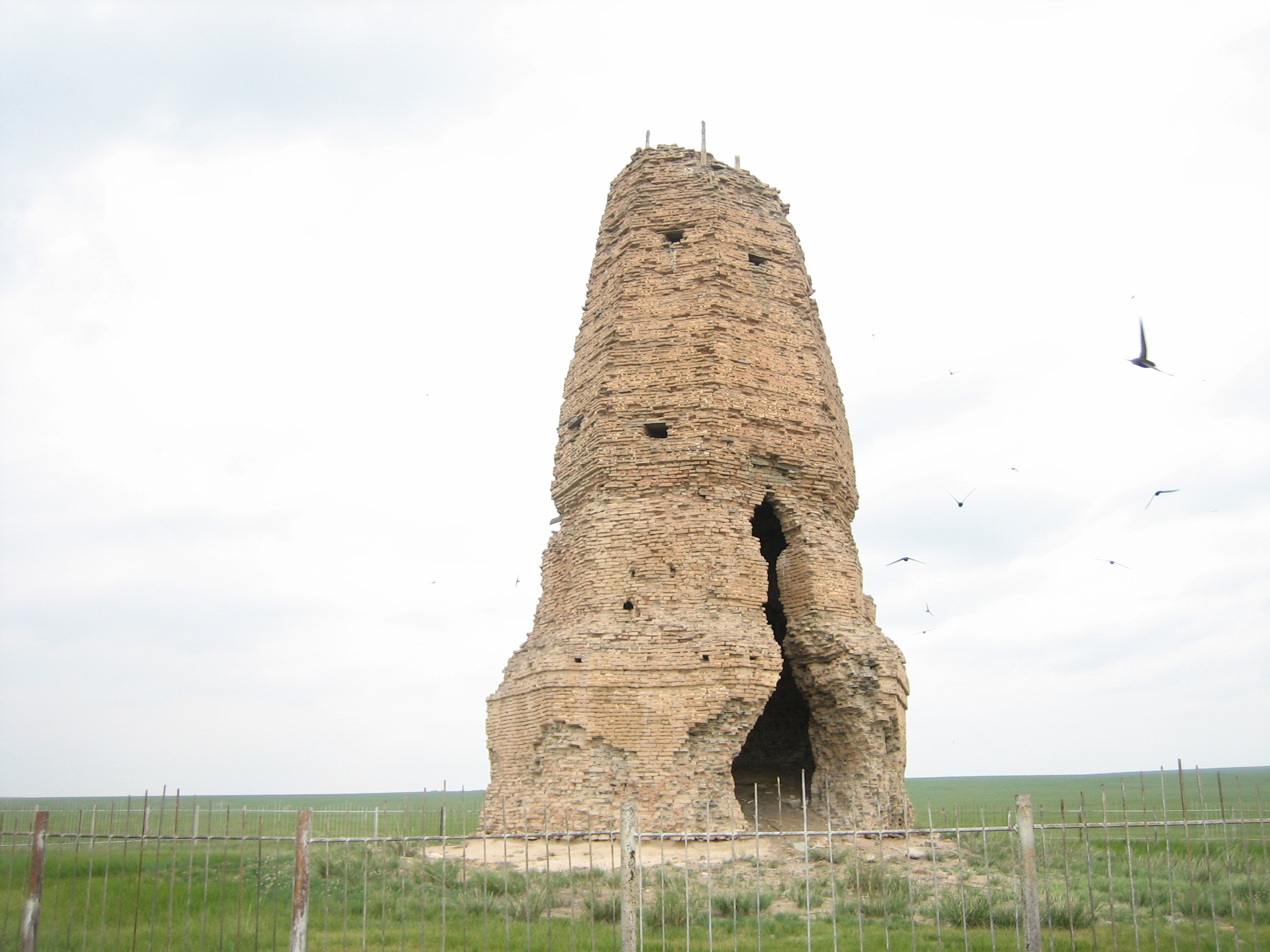
- Pagoda at Bars Hot in 2010, before restoration
- Interactive map of Bars Hot; Kherlen Bars
- Type: Ancient city
- Cultures: Khitans
- Location: Tsagaan-Ovoo, Dornod Province, Mongolia

Site notes
- Length: 1.6 km (0.99 mi)
- Width: 1.8 km (1.1 mi)
- Area: 2.88 km^{2} (1.11 sq mi)

Bars-Hot or Kherlen Bars (Mongolian: Хэрлэн Барс) was a city built by the Khitan people in the basin of the Kherlen River in Tsagaan-Ovoo, Dornod Province, Mongolia. During the Liao dynasty it was called Hedong City (Chinese: 河董城). It occupied an area of 1.6 by 1.8 kilometres and was surrounded with mud walls, which are today 4 metres thick and 1.5–2 metres high.

== Bars-Hot Pagoda ==
A ruined octagonal brick pagoda (sometimes referred to as a stupa or a watchtower) dating to the 11th century is located near the city walls. It originally comprised seven stories, but its top section is now missing. There were originally a pair of pagodas at this site, but in the 1940s the Soviet garrison used cannon fire to destroy the smaller pagoda. Although the remaining pagoda is missing its top section, at 16.5 metres (54 ft) in height it is the tallest surviving pre-modern structure in Mongolia.

In June 2014 a team of Mongolian and Japanese scientists surveyed the ruins of the pagoda, and made measurements and 3D scans of it. They found that the external brick wall was 1.8 metres (5.9 ft) thick, with an external diameter of 9 metres (30 ft) and an internal diameter of 5.6 metres (18 ft) at the base. They found traces of coloured plaster on the surface of the internal wall, which they considered to be remains of a mural painting.

The pagoda was extensively restored and reconstructed between 2014 and 2016 and now belongs to several attractions related to the Khitan in eastern Mongolia.
