= Numrug National Park =

National park in Dornod, Mongolia

- Нөмрөг ДЦГ
- Interactive map of Numrug National Park
- Type: National park
- Location: Dornod, Mongolia
- Area: 528,765.5 ha (2,041.575 mi^{2})

The Numrug National Park (Mongolian: Нөмрөг ДЦГ) is a national park in the westernmost part of Great Khingan range, Dornod Province, far eastern Mongolia.

== History ==
The park was declared a protected area in 1992.

=== 2026 fire ===
In October 2026, 79.8% of the protected area was burnt in a wildfire. The fire was first reported on October 8. Mongolian authorities deployed 606 people to stop the fire. On the Chinese side, 3,400 people were deployed to contain the fire from spreading further. On October 12 it was reported to be fully extinguished.

The fire was reportedly caused by a vehicle of Mobicom Corporation, which had dispatched workers to connect border stations with fiber optic lines, however the official investigation is still underway. On 15 October 2026, Mobicom's CEO Yasuhiro Ochi, who was also present during the field work, apologized for the damage caused by the fire.

== Geology ==
The national park is the easternmost point of Mongolia, bordering Inner Mongolia, China. The Degee River and Numrug River pass through the park merging into Khalkh River.

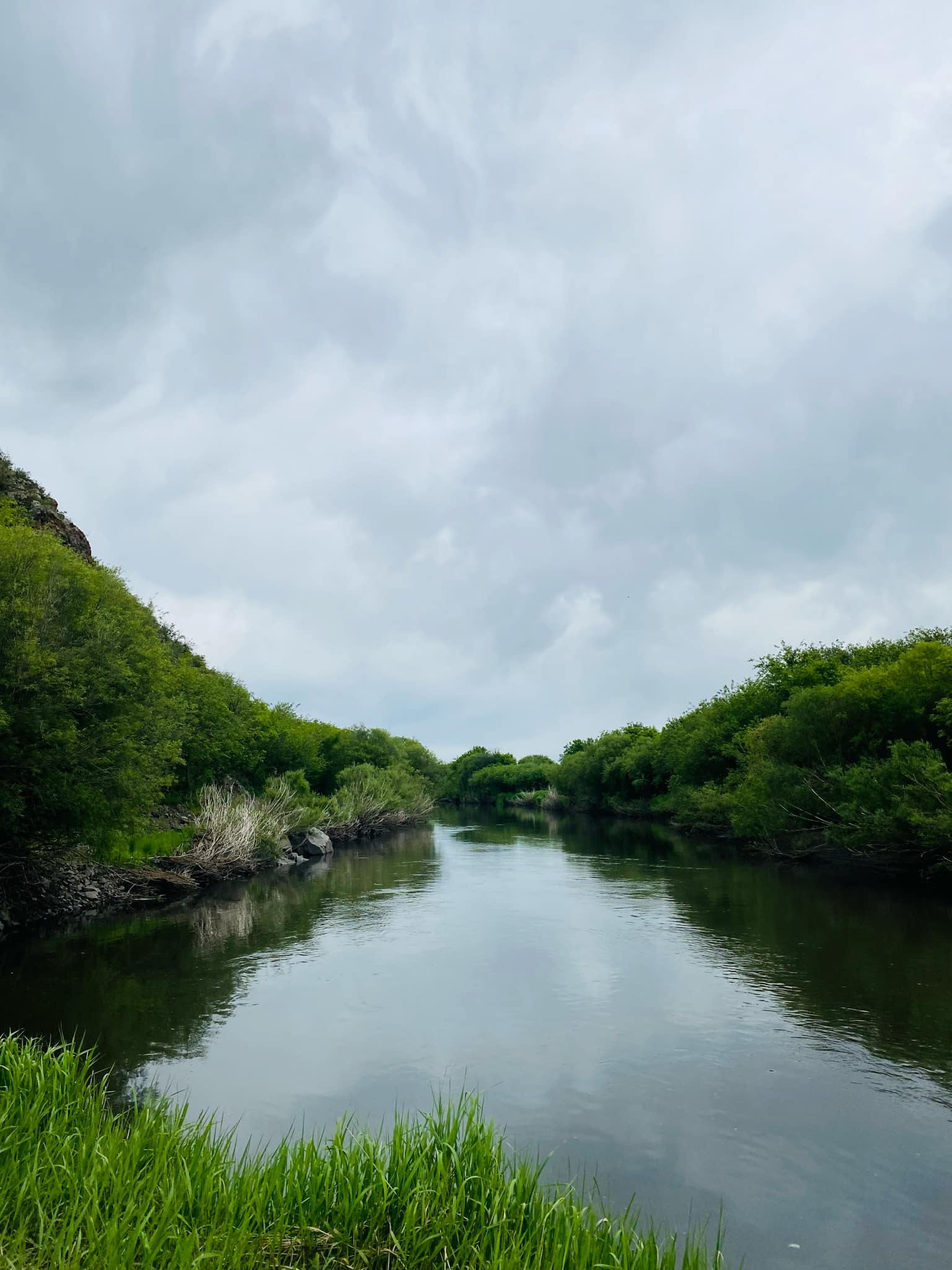
Numrug River in the westernmost part of the Greater Khingan range, Numrug National Park, Dornod province, Mongolia

== See also ==
- Geology of Mongolia
