= Central Library of Dornod Province =

Public library in Choibalsan, Dornod, Mongolia

- Дорнод Aймгийн Tөв Hомын Cан
- 48°04′12″N 114°31′29″E
- Location: Choibalsan, Dornod, Mongolia
- Type: public library
- Established: 27 February 1946

Collection
- Size: 300 (1946)

Other information
- Website: Official website (in Mongolian)

The Central Library of Dornod Province (Mongolian: Дорнод Aймгийн Tөв Hомын Cан) is a public library in Choibalsan, Dornod Province, Mongolia.

== History ==
The library was established on 27 February 1946.

== Collections ==
Upon its establishment, the library had 300 collections.

== See also ==
- National Library of Mongolia
