= Ereen, Dornod =

Settlement in Bayan-Uul, Dornod, Mongolia

Coordinates: 49°16′26″N 112°29′36″E

Ereen (Mongolian: Эрээн) is a settlement in the Bayan-Uul sum (district) of Dornod Province in eastern Mongolia.
