= Bayandun =

District in Dornod Province, Mongolia

Coordinates: 49°14′38″N 113°22′29″E

Bayandun District Баяндун сум ᠪᠠᠶ᠋ᠠᠨ ᠳᠣᠩ ᠰᠤᠮᠤ
- District
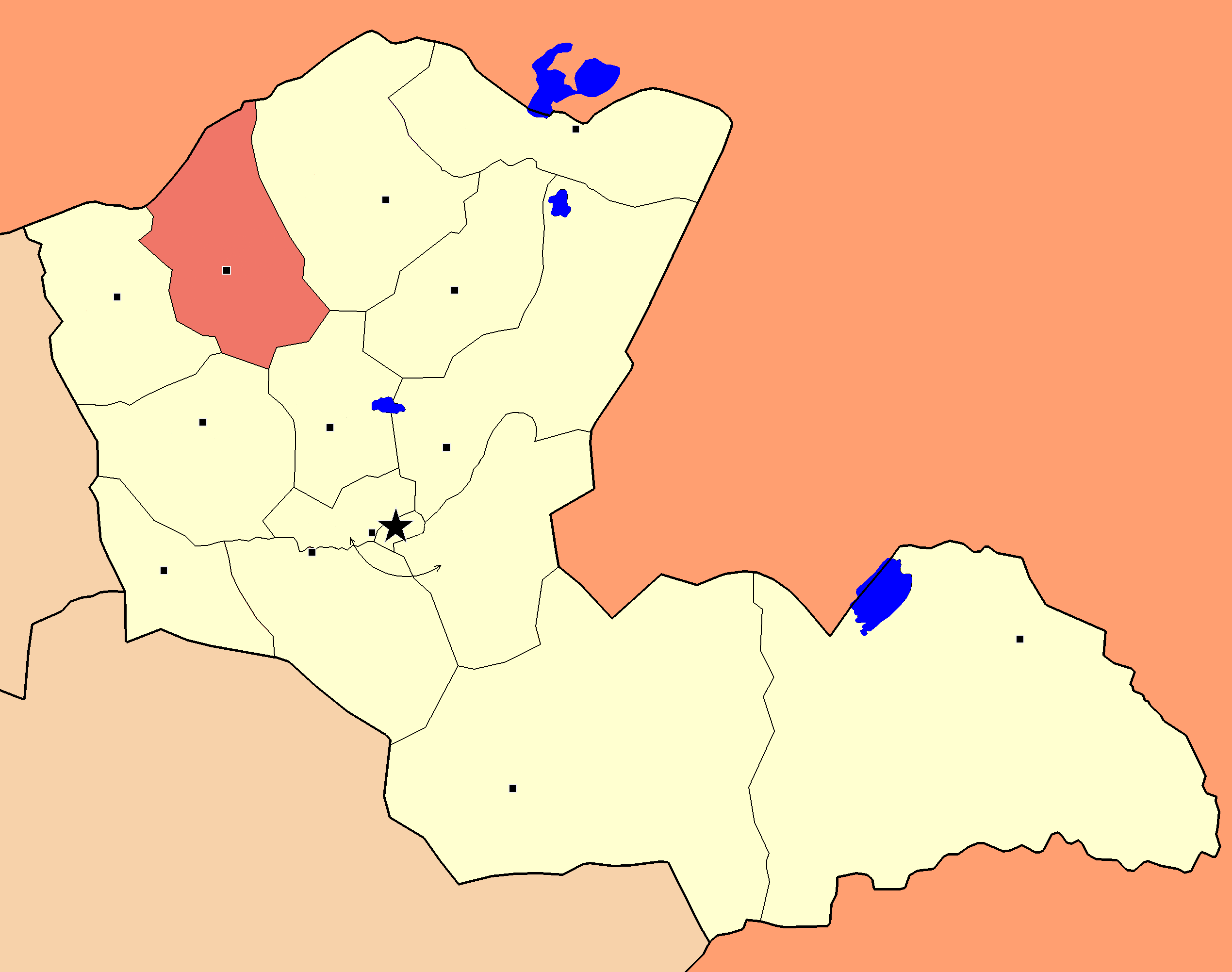
- Bayandun District in Dornod Province
- Country: Mongolia
- Province: Dornod Province

Area
  - Total: 6,237 km^{2} (2,408 sq mi)
- Time zone: UTC+8 (UTC + 8)

Bayandun (Mongolian: Баяндун "rich ocre") is a sum (district) of Dornod Province in eastern Mongolia. It is named for the local mountain with natural formations located in its territory, In 2009, its population was 2,936.

== Administrative divisions ==
The district is divided into four bags, which are:

- Khairkhan
- Naran
- Turgen
- Yargai
