= Khölönbuir, Dornod =

District in Dornod Province, Mongolia

Coordinates: 47°55′34″N 112°57′42″E

Khölönbuir District Хөлөнбуйр сум ᠬᠥᠯᠦᠨᠪᠦ᠋ᠢᠷᠰᠤᠮᠤ
- District
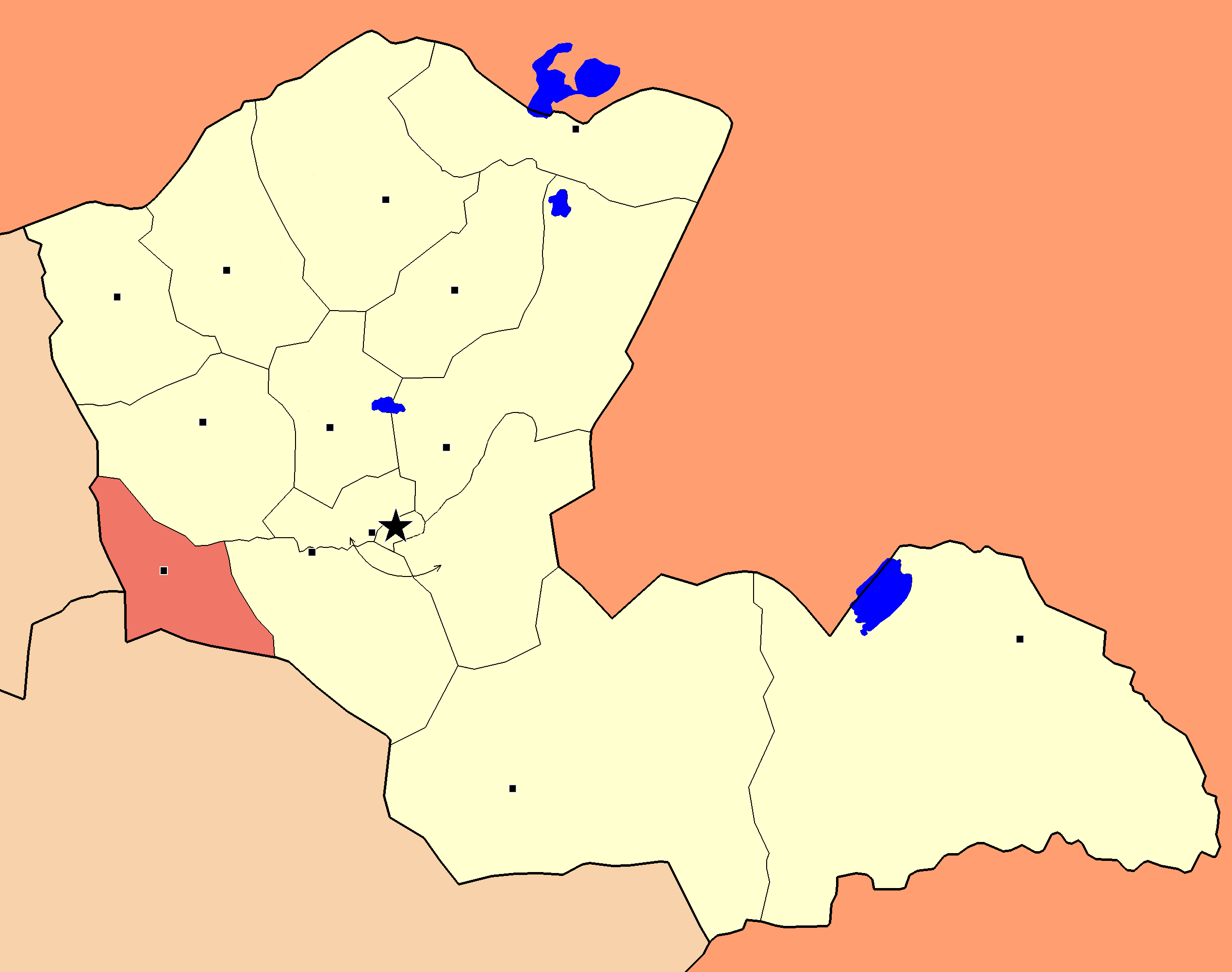
- Khölönbuir District in Dornod Province
- Country: Mongolia
- Province: Dornod Province

Area
  - Total: 3,773 km^{2} (1,457 sq mi)

Population (2009)
  - Total: 1,776
  - Density: 0.4707/km^{2} (1.219/sq mi)
- Time zone: UTC+8 (UTC + 8)

Khölönbuir (Mongolian: Хөлөнбуйр) is a sum (district) of Dornod Province in eastern Mongolia. In 2009, its population was 1,776.

== Administrative divisions ==
The district is divided into three bags, which are:

- Batkhaan
- Bayan-Ulziit
- Bayan-Uul
