= Dashbalbar, Dornod =

District in Dornod Province, Mongolia

Dashbalbar District Дашбалбар сум ᠳᠰᠢᠪᠠᠯᠪᠠᠷᠰᠤᠮᠤ
- District
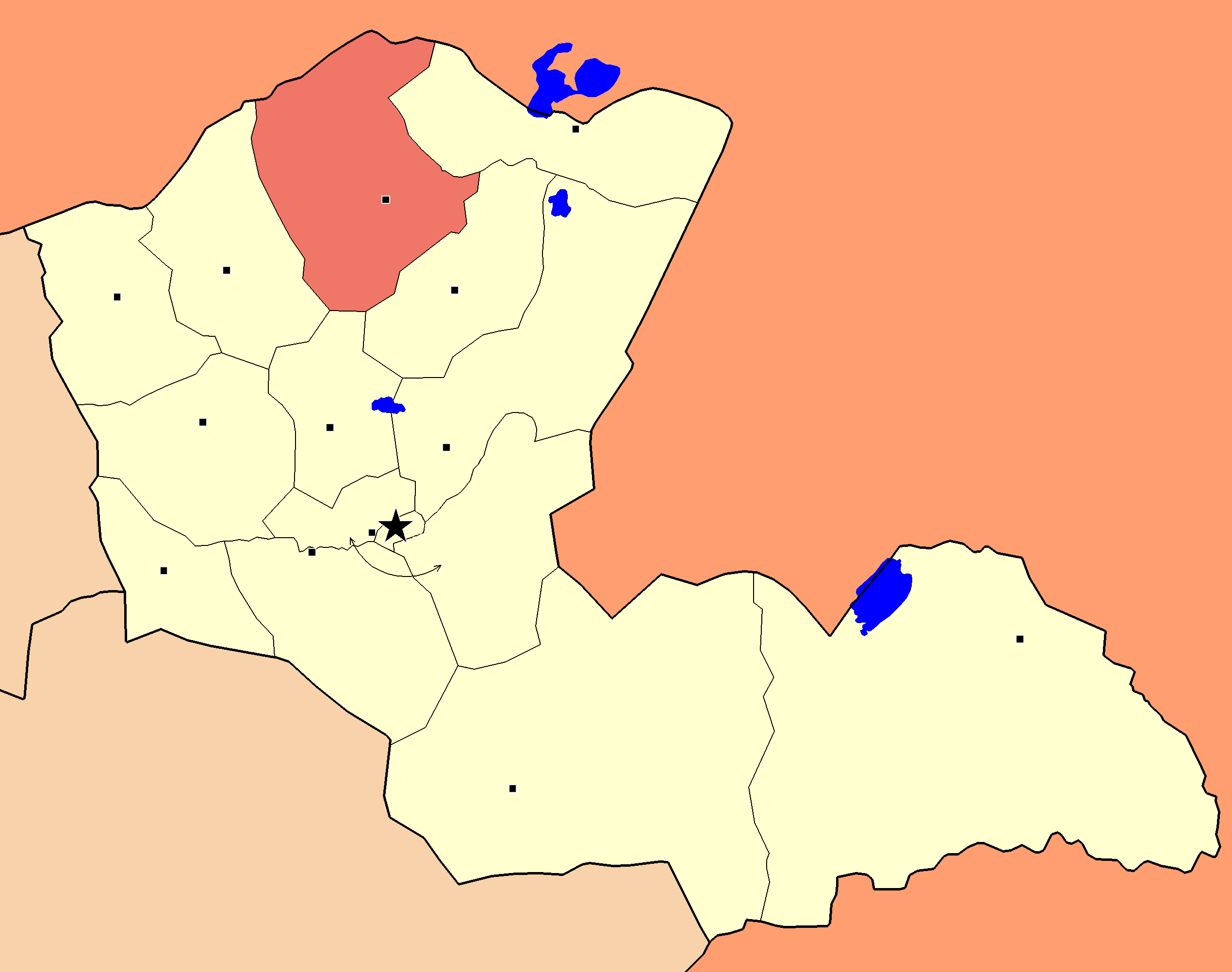
- Dashbalbar District in Dornod Province

- Location within Mongolia
- Coordinates: 49°32′38″N 114°24′20″E
- Country: Mongolia
- Province: Dornod Province

Area
  - Total: 8,713 km^{2} (3,364 sq mi)

Population (2009)
  - Total: 3,246
  - Density: 0.37/km^{2} (0.96/sq mi)
- Time zone: UTC+8 (UTC + 8)

Dashbalbar (Mongolian: Дашбалбар = blessings spread) is a sum (district) of Dornod Province in eastern Mongolia. The population of the sum in 2009 was 3,246, including 1,461 in the sum center. The sum covers 8,713 km² with a population density of 0.37 people/km².

== Climate ==
Dashbalbar has a subarctic climate (Köppen climate classification Dwc) with warm summers and severely cold winters. Most precipitation falls in the summer as rain, with some snow in the spring and autumn. Winters are very dry.

Climate data for Dashbalbar, elevation 705 m (2,313 ft), (1991–2020 normals, extremes 1976–1990, 1999–present)
Month	Jan	Feb	Mar	Apr	May	Jun	Jul	Aug	Sep	Oct	Nov	Dec	Year
Record high °C (°F)	1.0 (33.8)	9.5 (49.1)	21.3 (70.3)	30.2 (86.4)	36.6 (97.9)	39.6 (103.3)	40.3 (104.5)	41.4 (106.5)	33.7 (92.7)	27.1 (80.8)	14.0 (57.2)	6.7 (44.1)	41.4 (106.5)
Mean daily maximum °C (°F)	−14.8 (5.4)	−8.1 (17.4)	−0.5 (31.1)	10.5 (50.9)	18.8 (65.8)	25.5 (77.9)	26.8 (80.2)	24.6 (76.3)	18.4 (65.1)	8.3 (46.9)	−3.9 (25.0)	−12.2 (10.0)	7.8 (46.0)
Daily mean °C (°F)	−21.6 (−6.9)	−16.2 (2.8)	−7.7 (18.1)	3.2 (37.8)	11.1 (52.0)	18.1 (64.6)	20.4 (68.7)	18.0 (64.4)	11.1 (52.0)	1.1 (34.0)	−10.4 (13.3)	−18.3 (−0.9)	0.7 (33.3)
Mean daily minimum °C (°F)	−27.2 (−17.0)	−22.8 (−9.0)	−15.2 (4.6)	−4.2 (24.4)	3.2 (37.8)	10.5 (50.9)	14.1 (57.4)	11.5 (52.7)	3.6 (38.5)	−5.0 (23.0)	−16.0 (3.2)	−24.0 (−11.2)	−6.0 (21.3)
Record low °C (°F)	−44.5 (−48.1)	−37.7 (−35.9)	−35.3 (−31.5)	−21.7 (−7.1)	−11.5 (11.3)	−2.0 (28.4)	1.7 (35.1)	−5.3 (22.5)	−11.4 (11.5)	−22.9 (−9.2)	−34.5 (−30.1)	−37.6 (−35.7)	−44.5 (−48.1)
Average precipitation mm (inches)	1.9 (0.07)	1.3 (0.05)	2.4 (0.09)	13.2 (0.52)	15.2 (0.60)	48.3 (1.90)	112.6 (4.43)	87.6 (3.45)	32.0 (1.26)	4.7 (0.19)	4.2 (0.17)	2.7 (0.11)	326.1 (12.84)
Average precipitation days (≥ 1.0 mm)	0.4	0.4	0.9	2.3	4.1	10.9	18.3	17.9	6.4	1.6	1.4	0.8	65.4
Source 1: NOAA (precipitation 1976–1990)
Source 2: Starlings Roost Weather

== Administrative divisions ==
The district is divided into five bags, which are:

- Chukh
- Kharzat
- Nomint
- Sevsuul Jaraakhai
- Ulz
