= Chuluunkhoroot =

District in Dornod Province, Mongolia

Chuluunkhoroot Чулуунхороот сум ᠴᠠᠯᠠᠭᠤᠨᠬᠣᠷᠢᠶ᠋ᠠᠲᠤᠰᠤᠮᠤ
- District
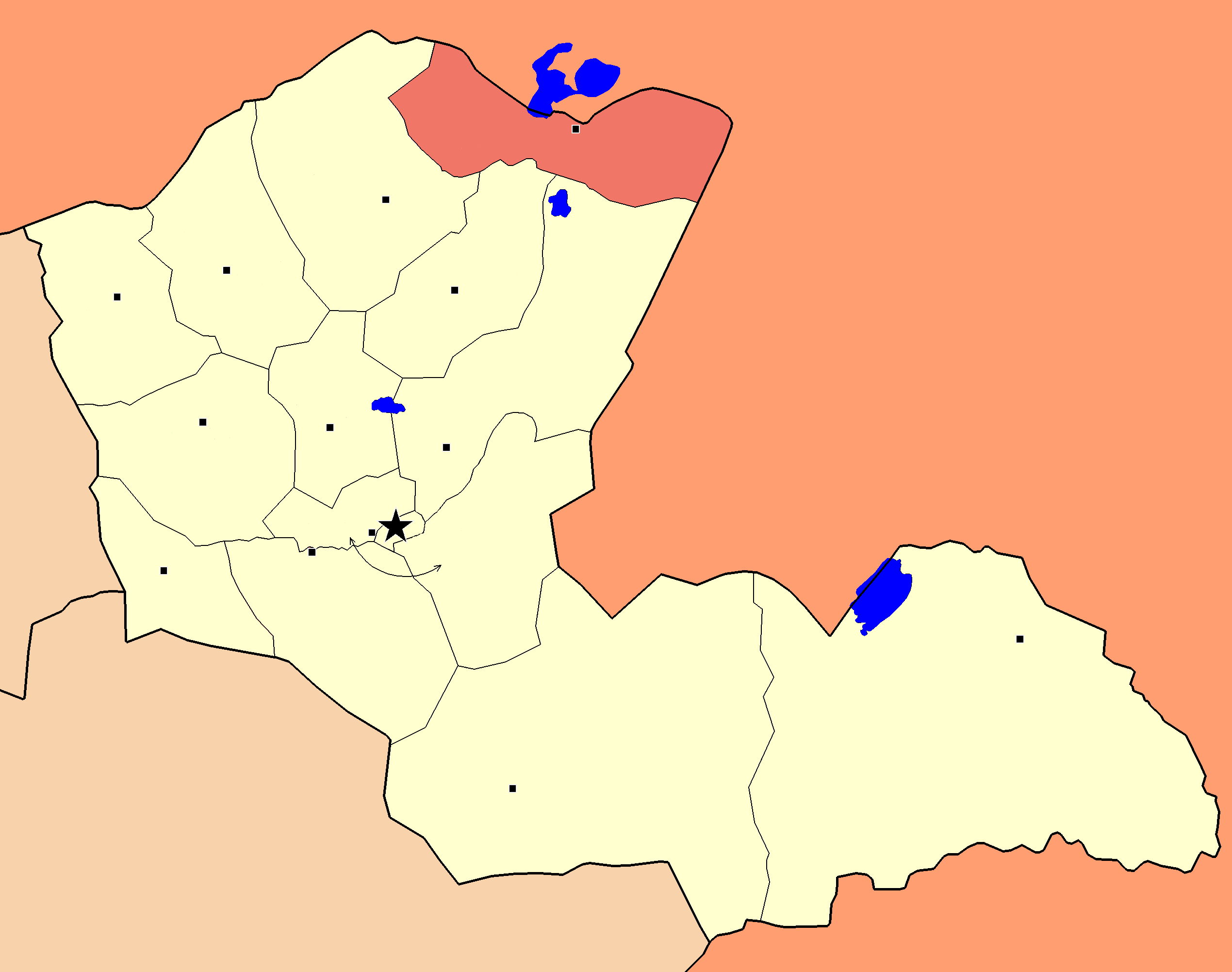
- Chuluunhoroot District in Dornod Province

- Location within Mongolia
- Country: Mongolia
- Province: Dornod Province

Area
  - Total: 6,539 km^{2} (2,525 sq mi)
- Time zone: UTC+8 (UTC + 8)

Chuluunkhoroot (Mongolian: Чулуунхороот, stone corral), also Ereentsav (Эрээнцав), is a sum (district) center in the Dornod Province, Mongolia. It is located very close to the Russian-Mongolian border, and sees frequent visits from Solov'yovsk on the Russian side. In 2009, its population was 1,609.

== History ==
It was established in the 1950s as a state farm collective, drawing settlers from other areas in the region, with tractors and large equipment mainly purchased from Russia. Due to this relatively large-scale settling, the town is an ethnic mix of Halh (60-65%), Buryat (about 30% from villages like Dashbalbar, Gurvanzagal, and Tsagaan Ovoo), and others (approx. 4-5%). Following the collapse of the Soviet Union, much of the Russian population left, taking their equipment with them, resulting in a rapid decline of the town's economic foundation. Buildings that housed Russian border troops became ruins and a small coal plant there was dismantled. Unemployment is upwards of 60% for young men between 18 and 25 years old, and alcoholism and domestic violence have increased. With recent international and provincial aid efforts, the town has begun to improve its conditions.

== Administrative divisions ==
The district is divided into three bags, which are:

- Delger
- Galuut
- Tsagaanchuluut

== Transportation ==
Chuluunkhoroot is on the Choibalsan - Borzya (in Russia) rail line, open in 1929. There is a passenger service to Choibalsan.
