= Kherlen, Dornod =

District in Dornod Province, Mongolia

Coordinates: 48.0783°N 114.5350°E

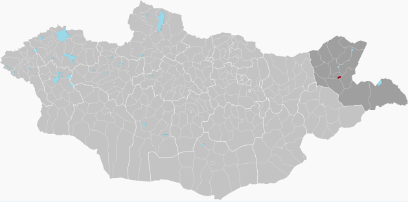
Kherlen District in Dornod Province

Kherlen (Mongolian: Хэрлэн) is a sum (district) of Dornod Province in eastern Mongolia. Its administrative center is the aimag capital Choibalsan.
