= Gurvanzagal =

District in Dornod Province, Mongolia

Coordinates: 49°08′53″N 114°52′33″E

Gurvanzagal District Гурванзагал сум ᠭᠤᠷᠪᠠᠨᠵᠠᠭᠠᠯᠰᠤᠮᠤ
- District
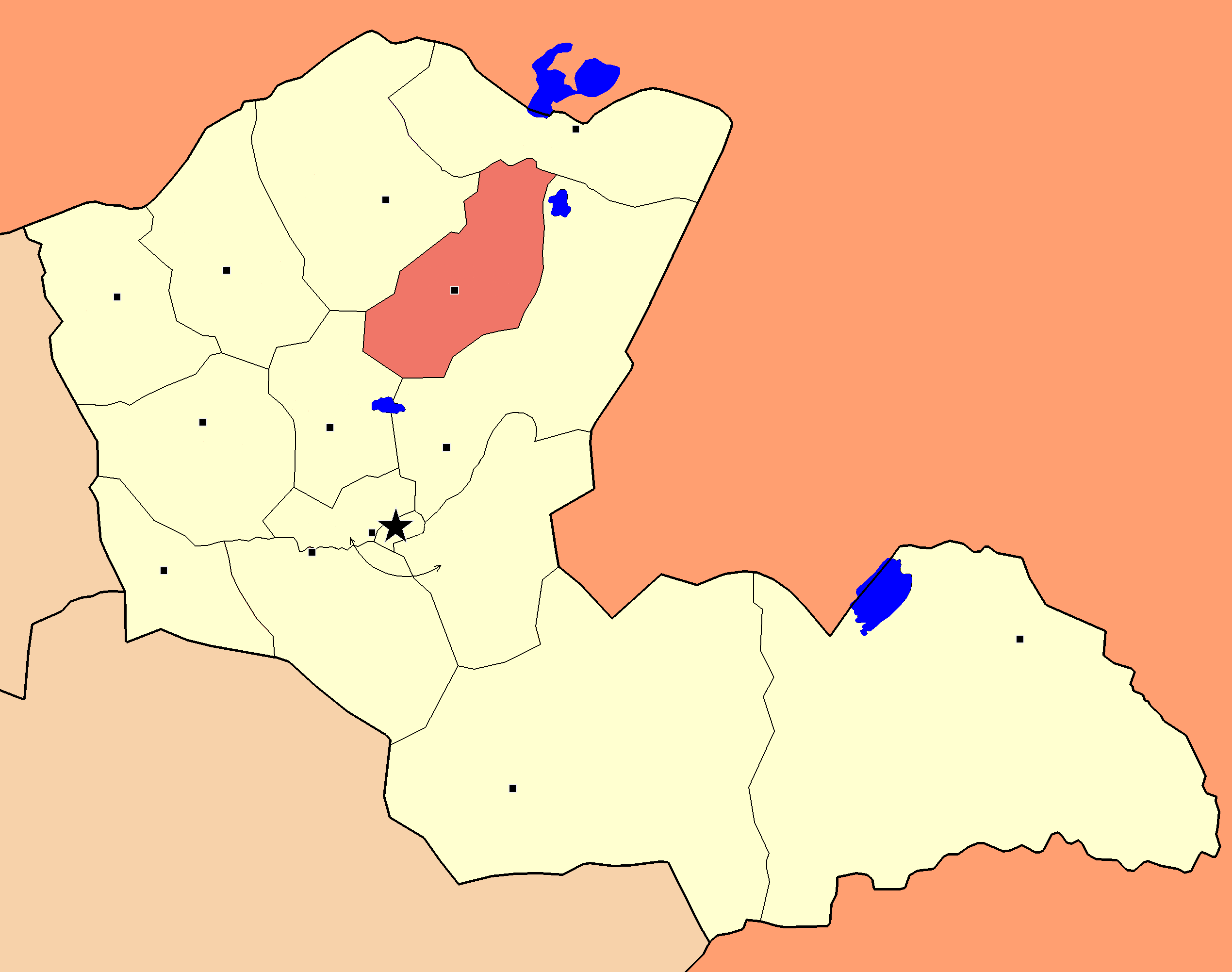
- Gurvanzagal District in Dornod Province
- Country: Mongolia
- Province: Dornod Province

Area
  - Total: 5,252 km^{2} (2,028 sq mi)

Population (2009)
  - Total: 1,338
  - Density: 0.2548/km^{2} (0.6598/sq mi)
- Time zone: UTC+8 (UTC + 8)

Gurvanzagal (Mongolian: Гурванзагал, Three zagal) is a sum (district) of Dornod Province in eastern Mongolia. In 2009, its population was 1,338.

== Administrative divisions ==
The district is divided into three bags, which are:

- Rashaant
- Sumiin Bulag
- Tsagaan Khoshuu
