= Bayan-Uul, Dornod =

District in Dornod Province, Mongolia

Coordinates: 49°07′19″N 112°40′16″E

Bayan-Uul District Баян-Уул сум ᠪᠠᠶ᠋ᠠᠨᠠᠭᠤᠯᠠᠰᠤᠮᠤ
- District
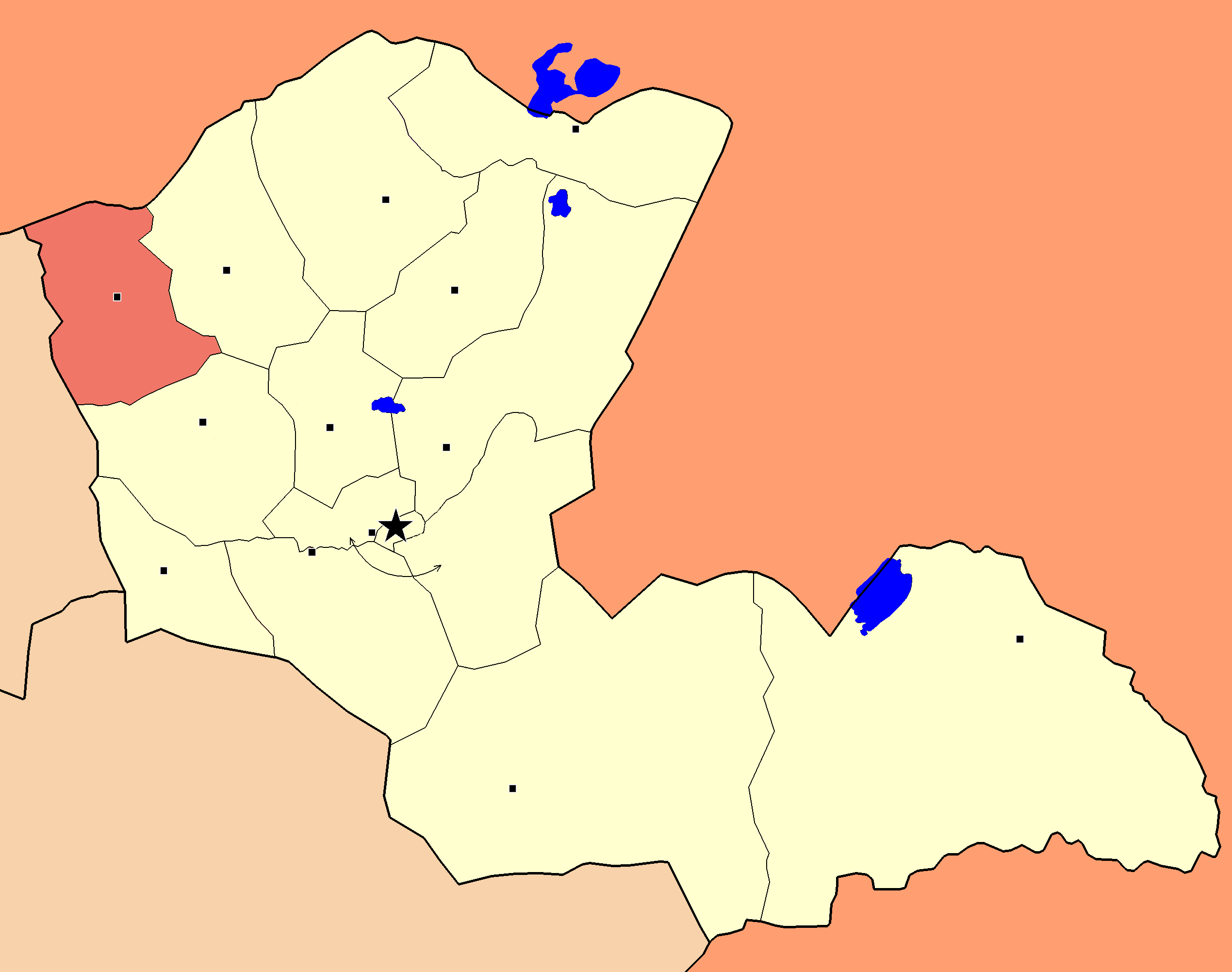
- Bayan-Uul District in Dornod Province
- Country: Mongolia
- Province: Dornod Province

Area
  - Total: 5,623 km^{2} (2,171 sq mi)
- Time zone: UTC+8 (UTC + 8)

Bayan-Uul (Mongolian: Баян-Уул, Rich mountain) is a sum (district) of Dornod Province in eastern Mongolia. Ereen settlement is 26 km NW from Bayan-Uul sum center. In 2009, its population was 4,451.

== Geography ==
Bayan-Uul is the western most district in Dornod Province.

== Administrative divisions ==
The district is divided into six bags, which are:

- Berkh
- Khar chuluut
- Ulz
- Urt
- Uvur ereen
- Zayaat
