= Khökh Nuur =

Lake in Choibalsan, Dornod, Mongolia

- Lake Khökh; Lake Hoh; Hoh Nuur
- Хөх нуур (Mongolian)
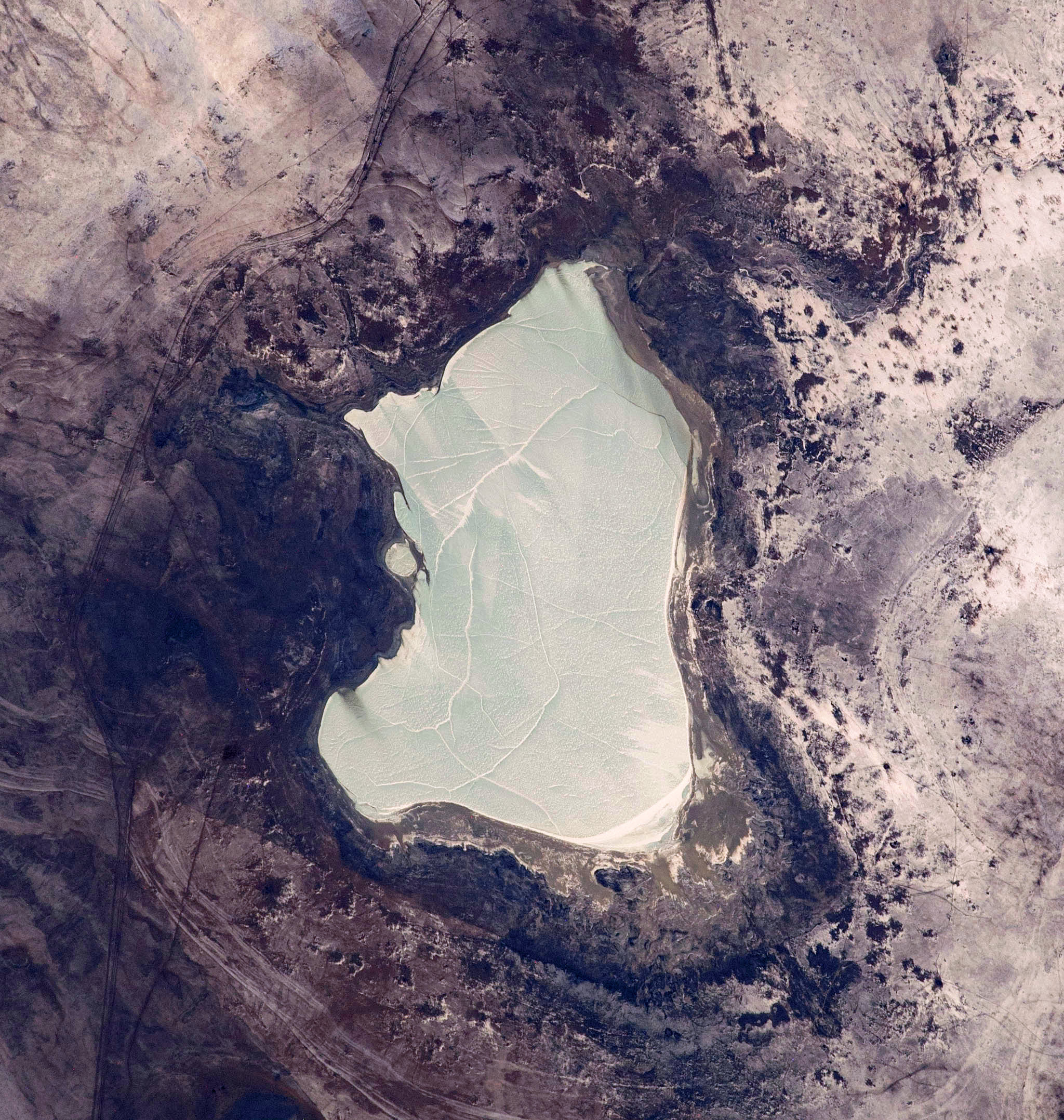
- View of lake taken during ISS Expedition 62

- Location within Mongolia
- Location: Choibalsan, Dornod, Mongolia
- Coordinates: 49°30′47.8″N 115°34′51.9″E
- Type: lake

Khökh Nuur (Mongolian: Хөх нуур, lit. 'Blue lake'), located in Choibalsan District, Dornod Province, is a lake and the lowest point in Mongolia at 560 metres (1,840 ft).

The bottom of the lake was cleaned in 2017.

It is part of the Landscapes of Dauria World Heritage Site.
