= Bayantümen =

District in Dornod Province, Mongolia

Coordinates: 48°03′06″N 114°22′42″E

Bayantümen District Баянтүмэн сум ᠪᠠᠶ᠋ᠠᠨᠲᠦ᠋ᠮᠡᠨᠰᠤᠮᠤ
- District
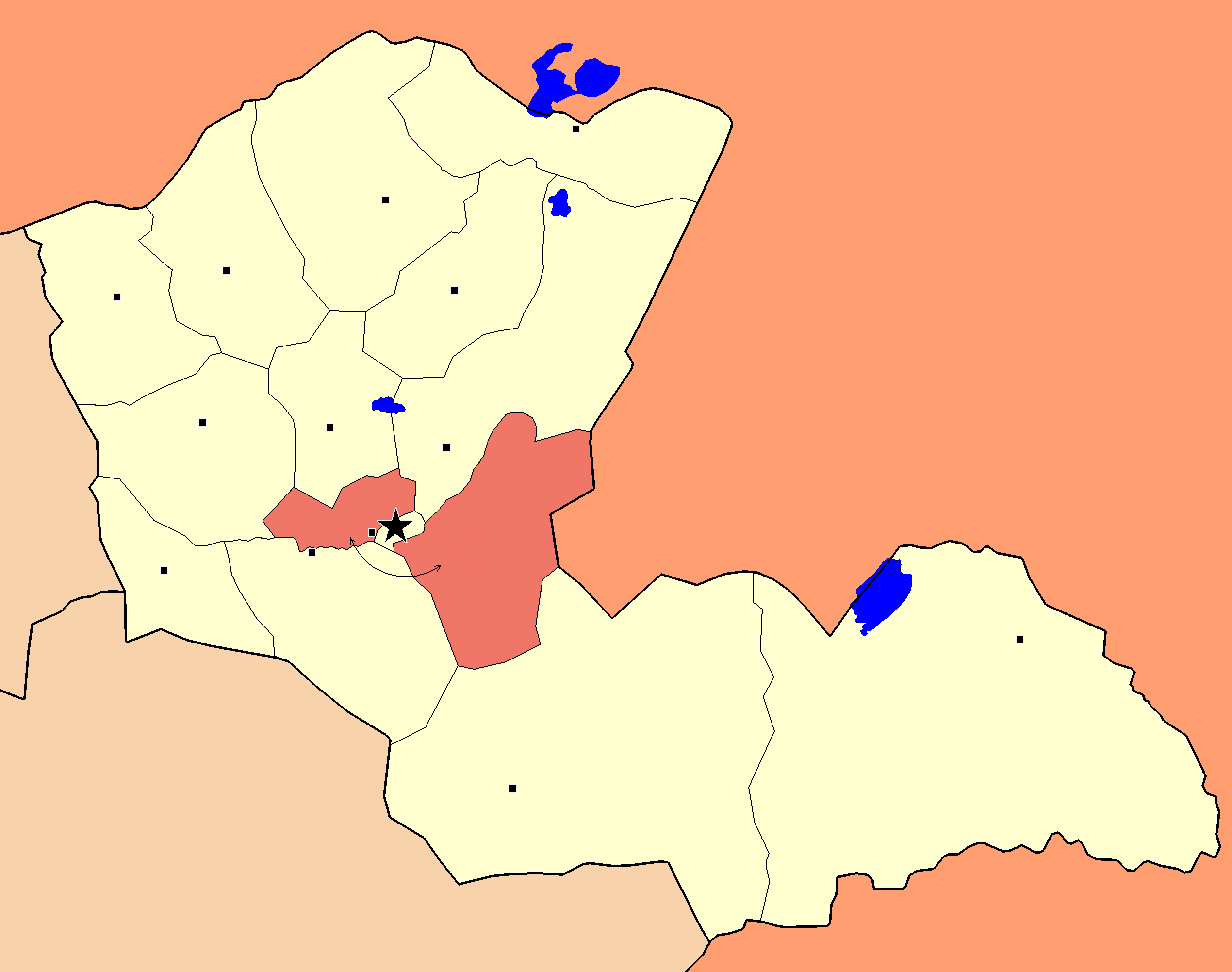
- Bayantümen District in Dornod Province
- Country: Mongolia
- Province: Dornod Province

Area
  - Total: 8,321 km^{2} (3,213 sq mi)
- Time zone: UTC+8 (UTC + 8)

Bayantu'men (Mongolian: Баянтүмэн, Rich tumen), also Tsagaanders (Mongolian: Цагаандэрс) is a sum (district) of Dornod Province in eastern Mongolia. Name "Bayantu'men" was in use for Choibalsan city (before 1941), the railway station and mine in the NE outskirts of Choibalsan city have name of Bayantu'men also. In 2009, its population was 2,006.

== Geography ==
The district is separated into the east part and west part, in which the Choibalsan City is located in between separating them.

== Administrative divisions ==
The district is divided into four bags, which are:

- Jargalant
- Khotont
- Tsagaan Ders
- Ulziit Bag
