= Tsagaan-Ovoo =

District in Dornod Province, Mongolia

Coordinates: 48°33′58″N 113°14′19″E

Tsagaan-Ovoo District Цагаан-Овоо сум ᠴᠠᠭᠠᠨᠣᠪᠤᠭ᠎ᠠᠰᠤᠮᠤ
- District
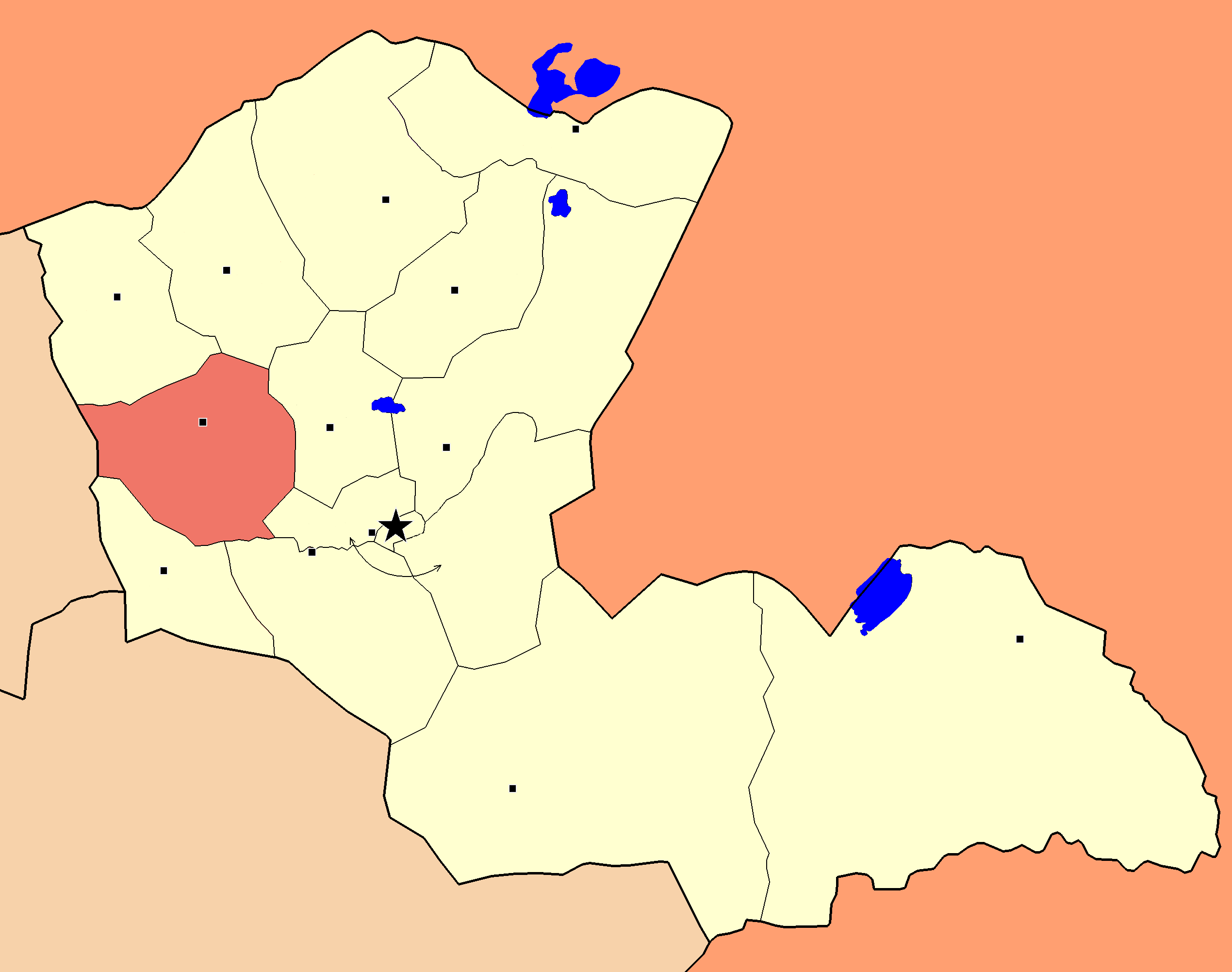
- Tsagaan-Ovoo District in Dornod Province
- Country: Mongolia
- Province: Dornod Province

Area
  - Total: 6,502 km^{2} (2,510 sq mi)

Population (2009)
  - Total: 3,696
  - Density: 0.5684/km^{2} (1.472/sq mi)
- Time zone: UTC+8 (UTC + 8)

Tsagaan-Ovoo (Mongolian: Цагаан-Овоо, White ovoo) is a sum (district) of Dornod Province in eastern Mongolia. In 2009, its population was 3,696.

== Administrative divisions ==
The district is divided into six bags, which are:

- Bayangol
- Elst
- Gun tsengeleg
- Khureet
- Khuuvur
- Zurkh
