= Choibalsan District =

District in Dornod Province, Mongolia

Coordinates: 48°26′21″N 114°52′26″E

Choibalsan District Чойбалсан сум ᠴᠣᠶᠢᠪᠯᠰᠠᠩᠰᠤᠮᠤ
- District
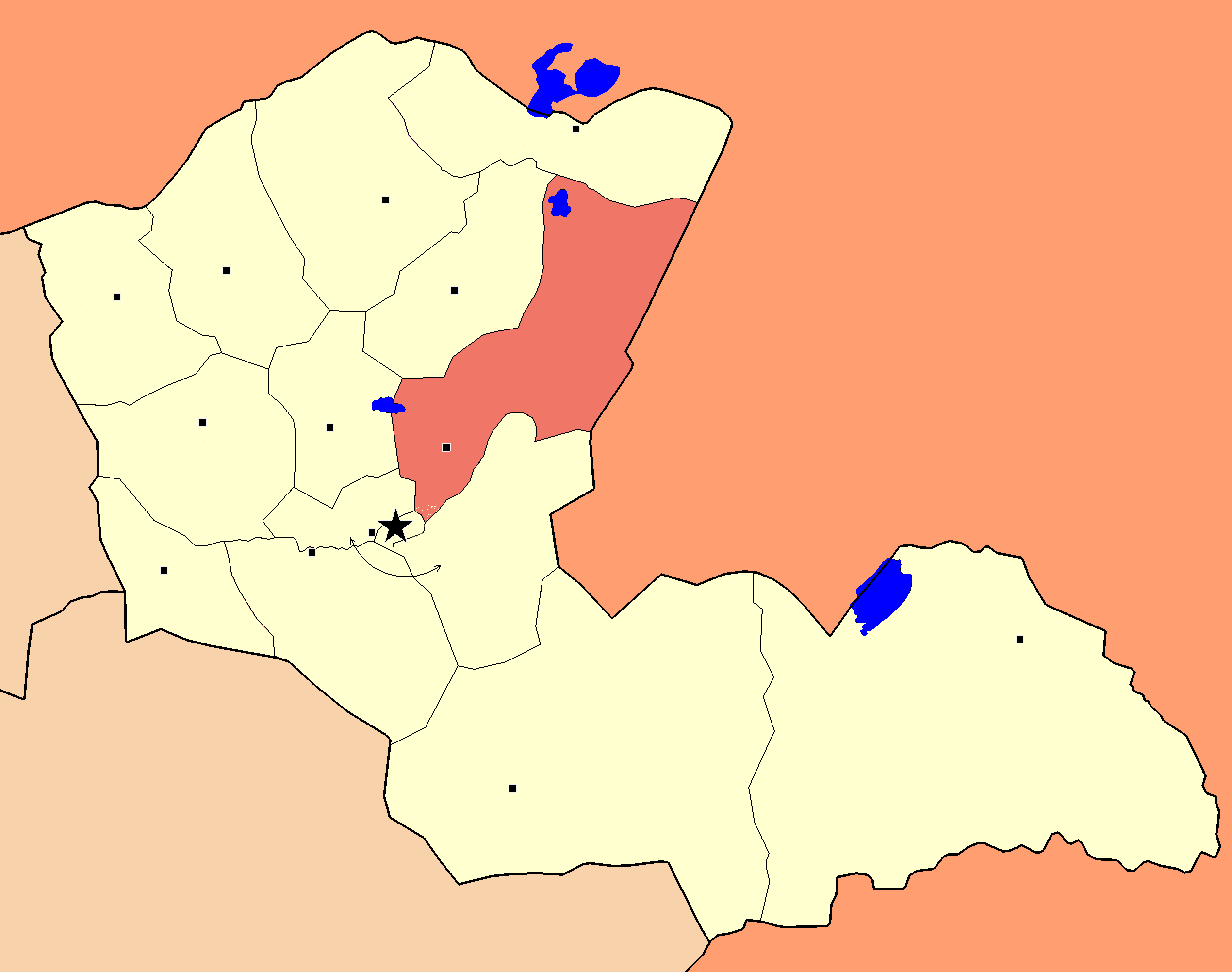
- Choibalsan District in Dornod Province
- Country: Mongolia
- Province: Dornod Province

Area
  - Total: 10,152 km^{2} (3,920 sq mi)
- Time zone: UTC+8 (UTC + 8)

Choibalsan District (Mongolian: Чойбалсан) is a sum (district) of Dornod Province in eastern Mongolia. Sum center is 55 km North from the Dornod aimag capital Choibalsan city. Subsequently, in 1944, the soum being the place where Marshal Khorloogiin Choibalsan was born and raised, was named "Choibalsan Sum" in his honor. Sum center has railway station Kherlengol on the Borzya (Russia) - Choibalsan city line. In 2009, its population was 2,691.

== Administrative divisions ==
The district is divided into four bags, which are:

- Enger Shand
- Khukhnuur
- Khulstai
- Sumber

== Tourist attractions ==
- Khökh Nuur
- Yakhi Lake
