= Sergelen, Dornod =

District in Dornod Province, Mongolia

Coordinates: 48°30′31″N 114°01′55″E

Sergelen District Сэргэлэн сум ᠰᠡᠷᠭᠦᠯᠡᠩᠰᠤᠮᠤ
- District
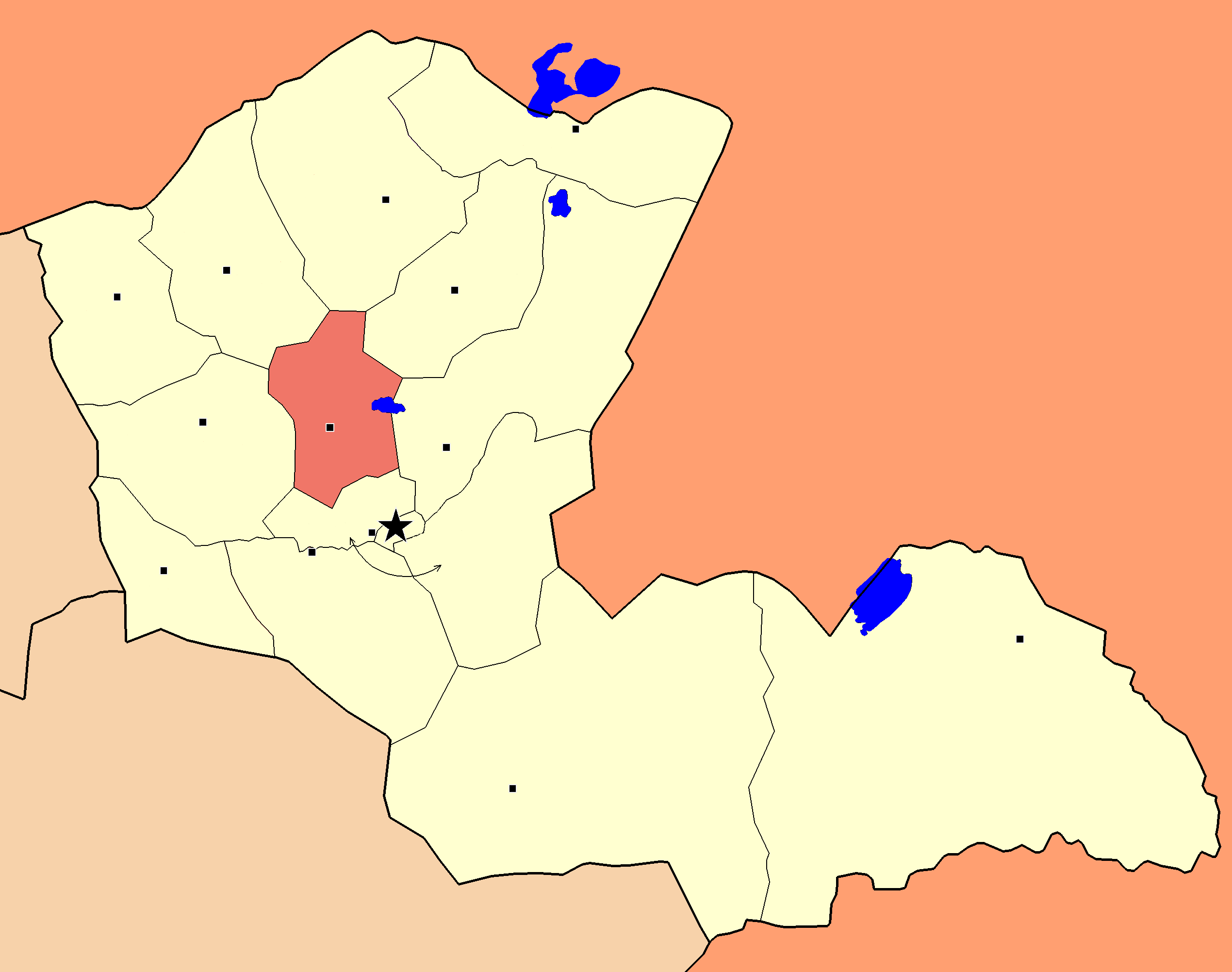
- Sergelen District in Dornod Province
- Country: Mongolia
- Province: Dornod Province

Area
  - Total: 4,169 km^{2} (1,610 sq mi)

Population
  - Total: 2,198
  - Density: 1.8/km^{2} (4.7/sq mi)
- Time zone: UTC+8 (UTC + 8)

Sergelen (Mongolian: Сэргэлэн; "brilliant") is a sum (district) of Dornod Province in eastern Mongolia. In 2009, its population was 2,198.

== History ==
Khogne District, founded in 1931, and Kherlenbayan District, founded in 1946, were merged in 1961 to form Sergelen District, centered on the slopes of Sergelen Kharat Mountain.

== Administrative divisions ==
The district is divided into five bags, which are:

- Arkhooloi
- Barchin
- Bayan
- Galiin gol
- Ochir khuree

== Tourist attractions ==
- Yakhi Lake
