= Choibalsan (city) =

District and provincial capital of Dornod Province, Mongolia

Choibalsan Чойбалсан ᠴᠣᠶᠢᠪᠠᠯᠰᠠᠩ
- District
- Herlen District; Хэрлэн сум ᠬᠡᠷᠦᠯᠦᠨᠰᠤᠮᠤ
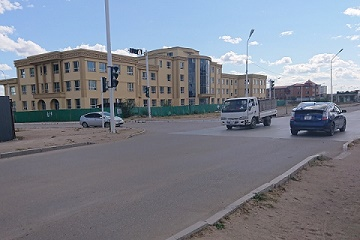
- Dornod Provincial Government Building in Choibalsan

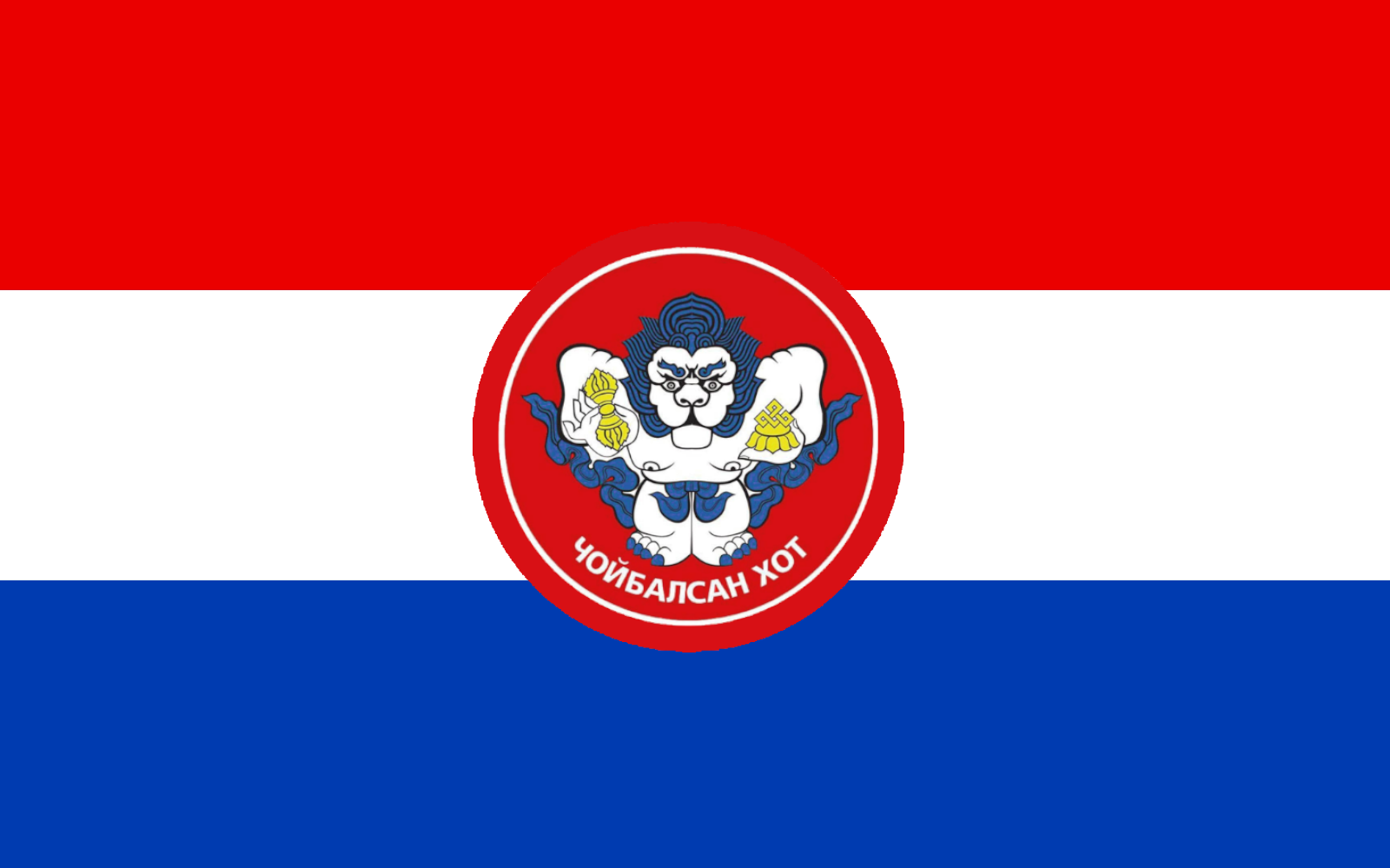
- Flag

- Location within Mongolia
- Coordinates: 48°04′42″N 114°32′06″E
- Country: Mongolia
- Province: Dornod Province

Area
  - Total: 281 km^{2} (108 sq mi)
- Elevation: 747 m (2,451 ft)

Population (2025)
  - Total: 38,537
  - Density: 137/km^{2} (355/sq mi)
- Time zone: UTC+8 (UTC + 8)
- Area code: +976 (0)158
- Website: www.dornod.gov.mn

Choibalsan (Mongolian: Чойбалсан) is the fourth-largest city in Mongolia after Ulaanbaatar, Darkhan, and Erdenet. The name of the city was Bayan Tümen (Баян Түмэн) until 1941, when it was renamed after the communist leader Khorloogiin Choibalsan in honor of the 20th anniversary of the Mongolian Revolution of 1921. It is the capital of the province of Dornod with the city's administrative unit named as Kherlen sum, enclosing an area of 281 square kilometres or 108 square miles. It is situated at the Kherlen River, at an elevation of 747 metres or 2,451 feet above sea level.

== History ==
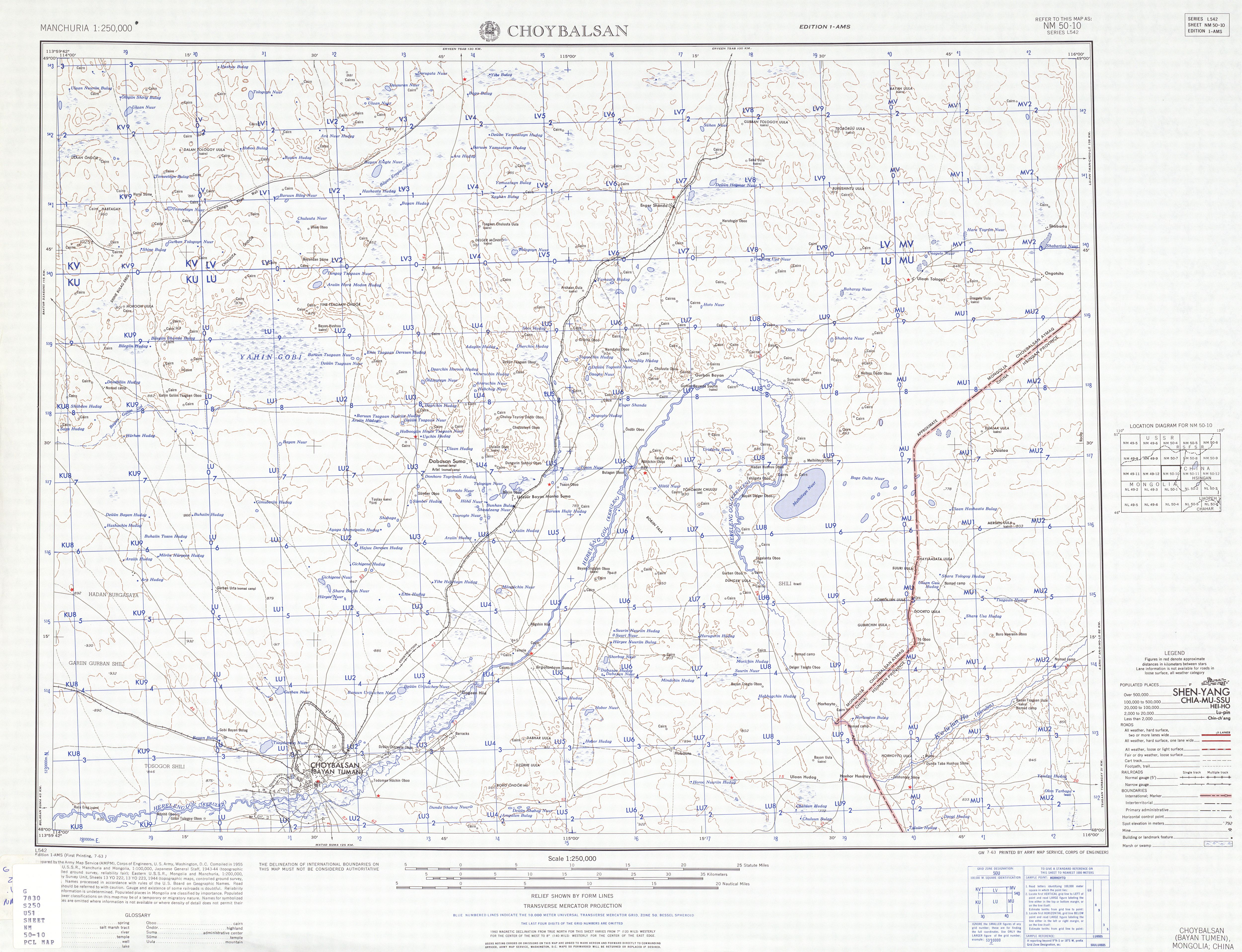
Choibalsan (labelled as CHOYBALSAN (BAYAN TUMAN)) (1955)

The location has been a post on a trading route for centuries. In the 19th century it grew into a city, and became the economic hub of eastern Mongolia in the twentieth century and is still serving as an active economic center for Eastern Mongolia.

Due to the city's proximity to the site of the Battle of Khalkhin Gol, it contains a museum dedicated to Georgy Zhukov, hero of the battle.

== Population ==
The city of Choibalsan has a population of 45,490 (1994), 41,714 (2000), 36,142 (2003), 39,500 (2006), 39,500 (2007, 53.2% of the Dornod Aimag's total population), 38,150 (2008, 51.2% of the Aimag's population) and 38,537 (2025).

Choibalsan is inhabited primarily by Halh Mongols, with smaller numbers of Buryats, Barga Mongols, and Üzemchin.

== Climate ==
Choibalsan experiences a cold semi-arid climate (Köppen BSk) with frigid, very dry winters and warm, wetter summers. In terms of temperatures it resembles a humid continental climate (Dwb), but falls short of that classification due to the very dry winters. Extreme temperatures range from a minimum of −41.1 °C (−42.0 °F) on 1 January 1959 to a maximum of 41.9 °C (107.4 °F) , recorded on 3 August 2016.

Climate data for Choibalsan, elevation 747 m (2,451 ft), (1991–2020 normals, extremes 1936–present)
Month	Jan	Feb	Mar	Apr	May	Jun	Jul	Aug	Sep	Oct	Nov	Dec	Year
Record high °C (°F)	1.1 (34.0)	8.6 (47.5)	22.6 (72.7)	31.5 (88.7)	36.4 (97.5)	41.2 (106.2)	41.5 (106.7)	41.9 (107.4)	35.1 (95.2)	30.0 (86.0)	16.5 (61.7)	5.4 (41.7)	41.9 (107.4)
Mean daily maximum °C (°F)	−14.5 (5.9)	−8.8 (16.2)	0.3 (32.5)	11.6 (52.9)	20.0 (68.0)	25.8 (78.4)	27.8 (82.0)	25.9 (78.6)	19.6 (67.3)	9.3 (48.7)	−3.4 (25.9)	−12.4 (9.7)	8.4 (47.2)
Daily mean °C (°F)	−20.2 (−4.4)	−15.5 (4.1)	−6.4 (20.5)	4.5 (40.1)	12.6 (54.7)	19.0 (66.2)	21.5 (70.7)	19.3 (66.7)	12.3 (54.1)	2.5 (36.5)	−9.5 (14.9)	−17.7 (0.1)	1.9 (35.4)
Mean daily minimum °C (°F)	−24.6 (−12.3)	−21.0 (−5.8)	−12.5 (9.5)	−2.2 (28.0)	5.3 (41.5)	12.3 (54.1)	15.7 (60.3)	13.4 (56.1)	5.9 (42.6)	−3.1 (26.4)	−14.3 (6.3)	−21.8 (−7.2)	−3.9 (25.0)
Record low °C (°F)	−41.1 (−42.0)	−39.6 (−39.3)	−36.1 (−33.0)	−17.2 (1.0)	−8.9 (16.0)	−0.5 (31.1)	4.4 (39.9)	0.3 (32.5)	−7.2 (19.0)	−21.0 (−5.8)	−29.4 (−20.9)	−37.2 (−35.0)	−41.1 (−42.0)
Average precipitation mm (inches)	2 (0.1)	2 (0.1)	4 (0.2)	6 (0.2)	17 (0.7)	38 (1.5)	68 (2.7)	52 (2.0)	28 (1.1)	10 (0.4)	4 (0.2)	4 (0.2)	235 (9.4)
Average precipitation days (≥ 1.0 mm)	1.3	1.5	1.6	2.5	3.4	6.3	8.6	6.9	4.7	2.5	1.8	2.0	43.1
Average relative humidity (%)	74.2	69.7	58.3	41.7	40.0	49.8	58.8	60.0	54.8	55.7	65.4	73.3	58.5
Mean monthly sunshine hours	198.5	212.0	266.1	264.0	294.9	307.3	297.9	287.1	258.2	239.2	199.5	177.6	3,002.3
Mean daily sunshine hours	6.4	7.5	8.6	8.8	9.5	10.2	9.6	9.3	8.6	7.7	6.7	5.7	8.2
Source 1: Pogoda.ru.net
Source 2: NOAA (sun, 1961-1990), Deutscher Wetterdienst (daily sun 1961-1990)

== Infrastructure ==
- Choibalsan Thermal Power Plant

== Tourist attractions ==
- Central Library of Dornod Province

== Transportation ==
The Choibalsan Airport (COQ/ZMCD) has one paved runway, and is served by regular flights to Ulaanbaatar, and Hailar and Manzhouli in Inner Mongolia, China.

There is a railway line (unconnected to the rest of the Mongolian rail network) that connects Choibalsan to the Trans-Siberian Railway (the original routing) in Borzya, Russia; although there are no passenger service across the border: passenger trains from Choibalsan terminate in Chuluunkhoroot (Ereentsav).
