= Dornod Province =

Province of Mongolia

Dornod Province Дорнод аймаг ᠳᠣᠷᠤᠨᠠᠳᠤᠠᠶᠢᠮᠠᠭ
- Province
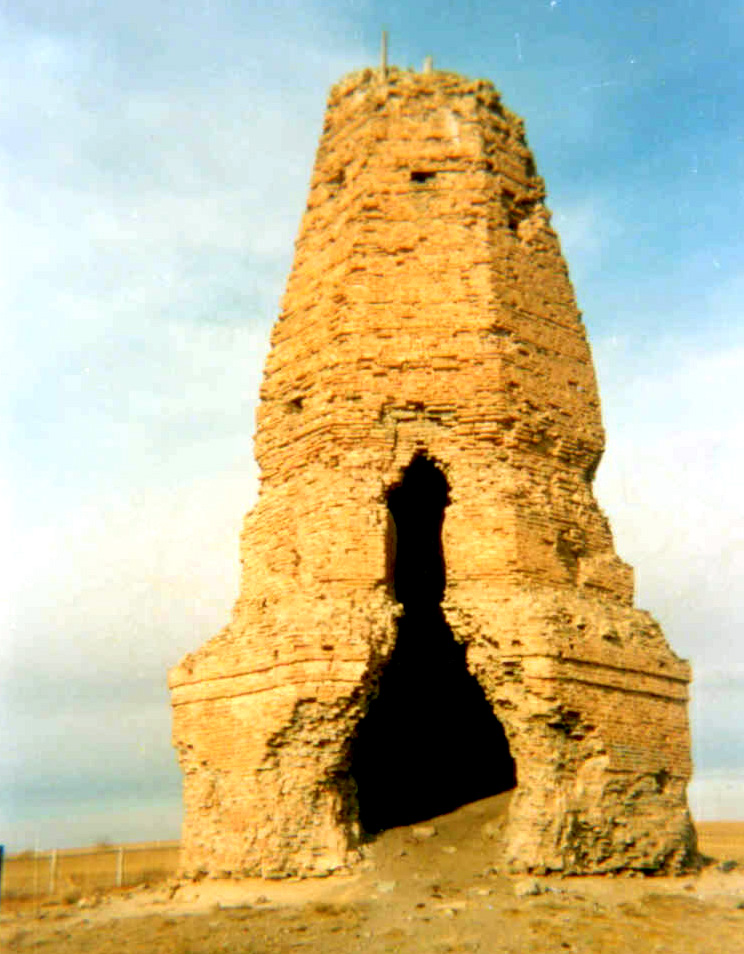
- The 10th century Stupa in the Khitan city of Bars-Hot

- Flag Coat of arms

- Coordinates: 48°04′N 114°30′E
- Country: Mongolia
- Established: 1941
- Capital: Choibalsan

Area
  - Total: 123,597.43 km^{2} (47,721.23 sq mi)
- Elevation: 807 m (2,648 ft)

Population (2017)
  - Total: 76,507
  - Density: 0.61900/km^{2} (1.6032/sq mi)

GDP
  - Total: MNT 944 billion US$ 0.3 billion (2022)
  - Per capita: MNT 11,151,660; US$ 3,570 (2022)
- Time zone: UTC+8
- Area code: +976 (0)158
- ISO 3166 code: MN-061
- Vehicle registration: ДО_
- Website: dornod.gov.mn

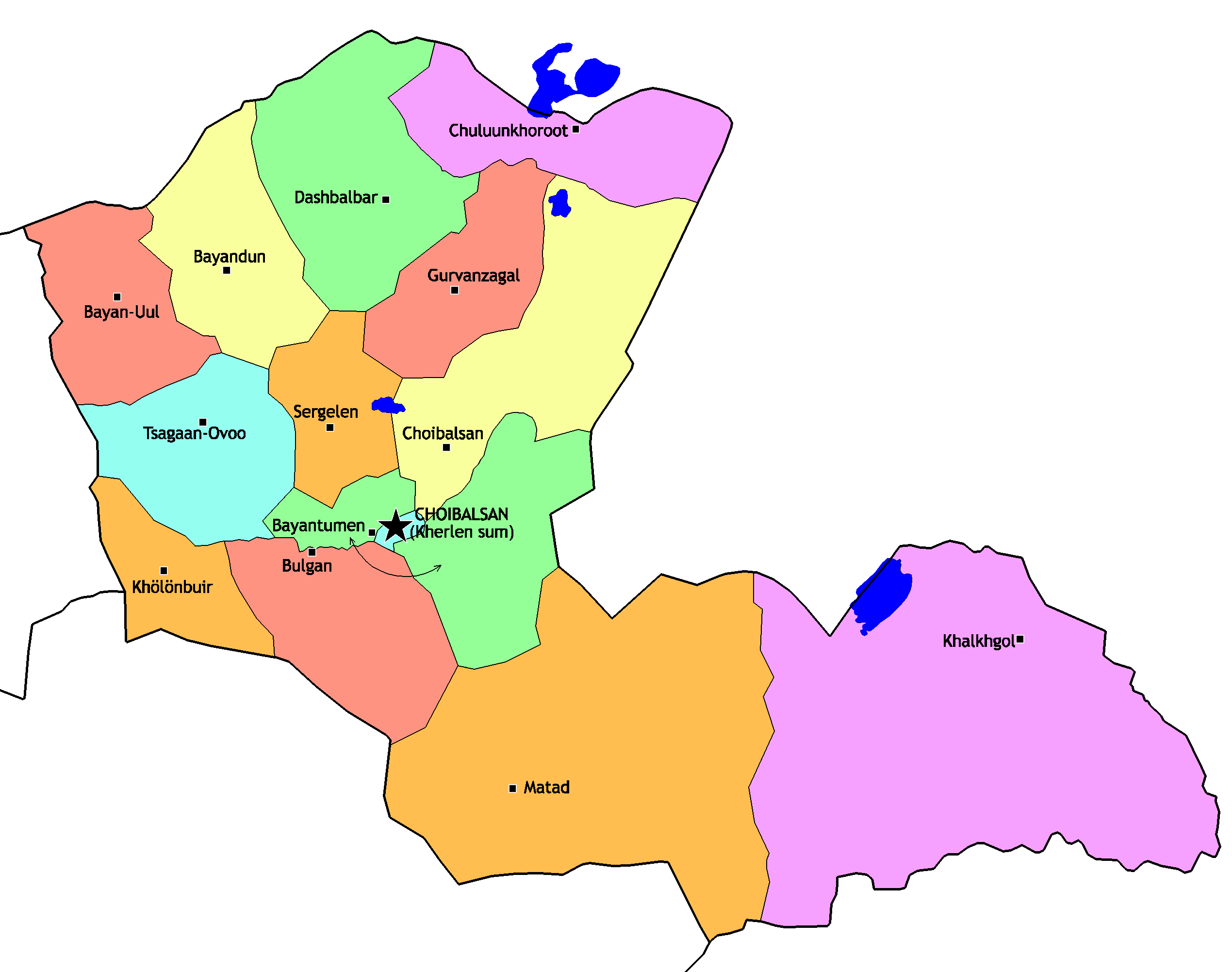
Sums of Dornod

Dornod (Mongolian: Дорнод, [ˈtɔrnɞt]; lit. 'East') is the easternmost of the 21 aimags (provinces) of Mongolia. Its capital is Choibalsan.

== Population ==
Halh are the ethnic majority of the Dornod aimag. The Buryat ethnic group makes up 22.8% of the total population (17,196 in 2000, census) concentrated in the north-eastern sums of Dashbalbar, Tsagaan-Ovoo, Bayan-Uul, Bayandun and aimag capital Choibalsan. There are several small ethnic groups: Barga (populates Gurvanzagal and Hölönbuir sums), Uzemchin (are present in Sergelen, Bayantümen, Bulgan, Chuluunhoroot sums and Choibalsan city), Hamnigan ethnic group (Bayan-Uul and Tsagaan-Ovoo sums).

== History ==
The aimag was created during the administrative reorganisation of 1941 with the name of Choibalsan, after the communist leader Khorloogiin Choibalsan. The capital, which previously had been called Bayan Tümen, also received the name Choibalsan. In 1963, the aimag was given the current name Dornod.

== Geography ==
Dornod Province is situated in the easternmost region of Mongolia and shares borders with Russia and China. It covers an area of approximately 123,500 square kilometers (47,684 square miles). The landscape of Dornod is diverse, featuring grasslands, mountains, and rivers.

== Transportation ==
The Choibalsan International Airport (COQ/ZMCD) has one paved runway, and is served by regular flights to Ulaanbaatar and Hailar, China.

== Administrative subdivisions ==
The sums of Dornod Aimag
Sum	Mongolian	Area (km²)	Population (2005)	Population (2009)	Density (/km²)	Sum centre population
Bayandun	Баяндун	6,237	2,906	2,936	0.47	1,231
Bayantümen	Баянтүмэн	8,321	1,945	2,006	0.24	840
Bayan-Uul	Баян-Уул	5,623	4,737	4,451	0.79	2,553
Bulgan	Булган	7,111	1,860	1,775	0.25	815
Choibalsan	Чойбалсан	10,152	2,844	2,691	0.27	1,305
Chuluunkhoroot (Ereentsav)	Чулуунхороот (Эрээнцав)	6,539	1,518	1,609	0.25	696
Dashbalbar	Дашбалбар	8,713	3,347	3,246	0.37	1,461
Gurvanzagal	Гурванзагал	5,252	1,386	1,338	0.25	441
Khalkhgol	Халхгол	28,093	2,863	3,203	0.11	1,756
Kherlen^{[1]}	Хэрлэн	281	40,667	40,439	143.91	40,439
Khölönbuir	Хөлөнбуйр	3,773	1,847	1,776	0.47	804
Matad	Матад	22,831	2,274	2,526	0.11	834
Sergelen	Сэргэлэн	4,169	2,194	2,198	0.53	577
Tsagaan-Ovoo	Цагаан-Овоо	6,502	3,393	3,696	0.57	1,488

^1 - Sum center is aimag capital Choibalsan (Чойбалсан)

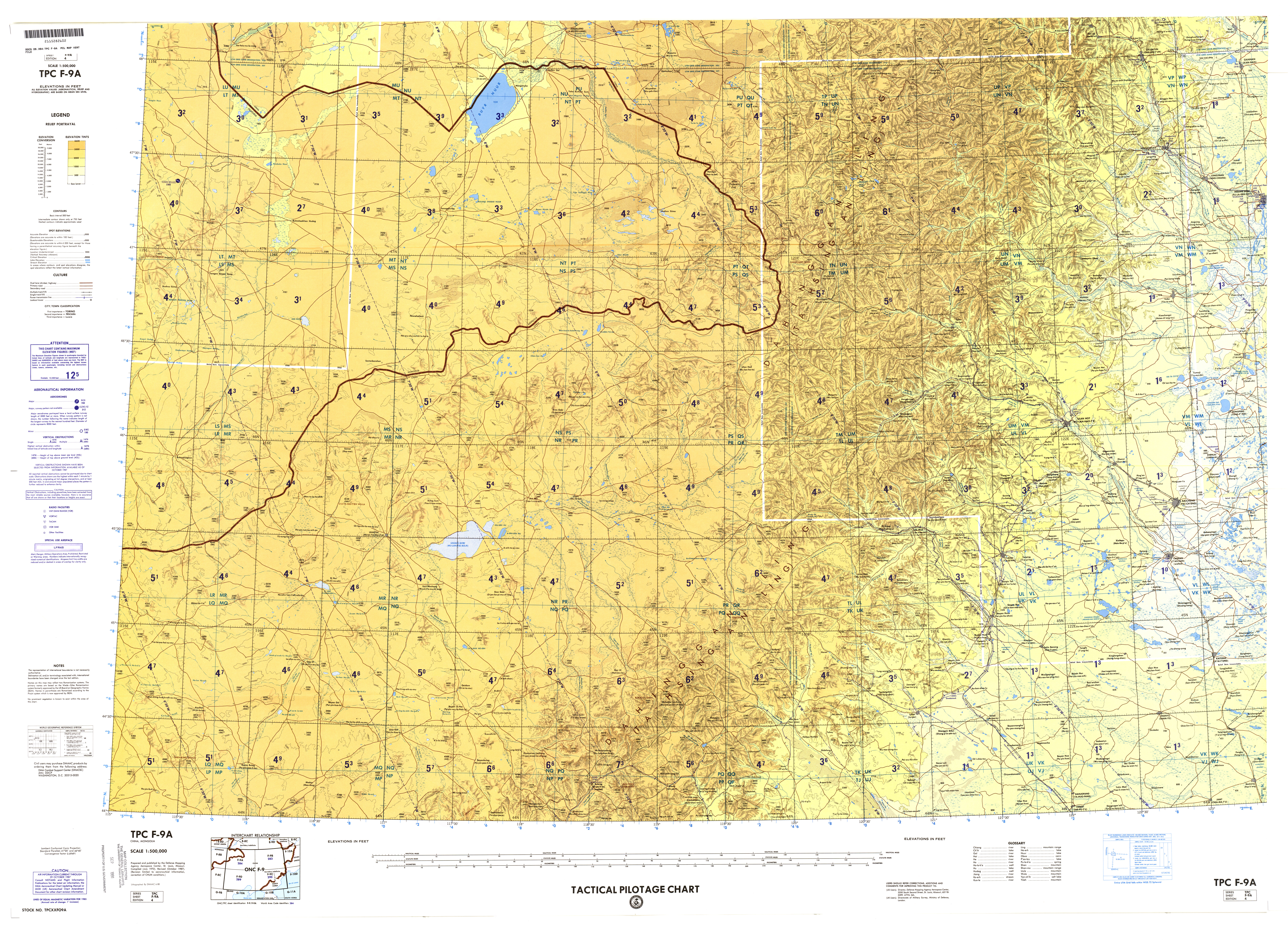
Map including the Dornod Province area

== Economy ==
In 2018, the province contributed to 2.82% of the total national GDP of Mongolia.

== Notable residents ==
- Chimediin Saikhanbileg, prime minister of Mongolia
- Kirishima Tetsuo, sumo wrestler at komusubi rank
