= Taryatu-Chulutu =

Volcanic field in Mongolia

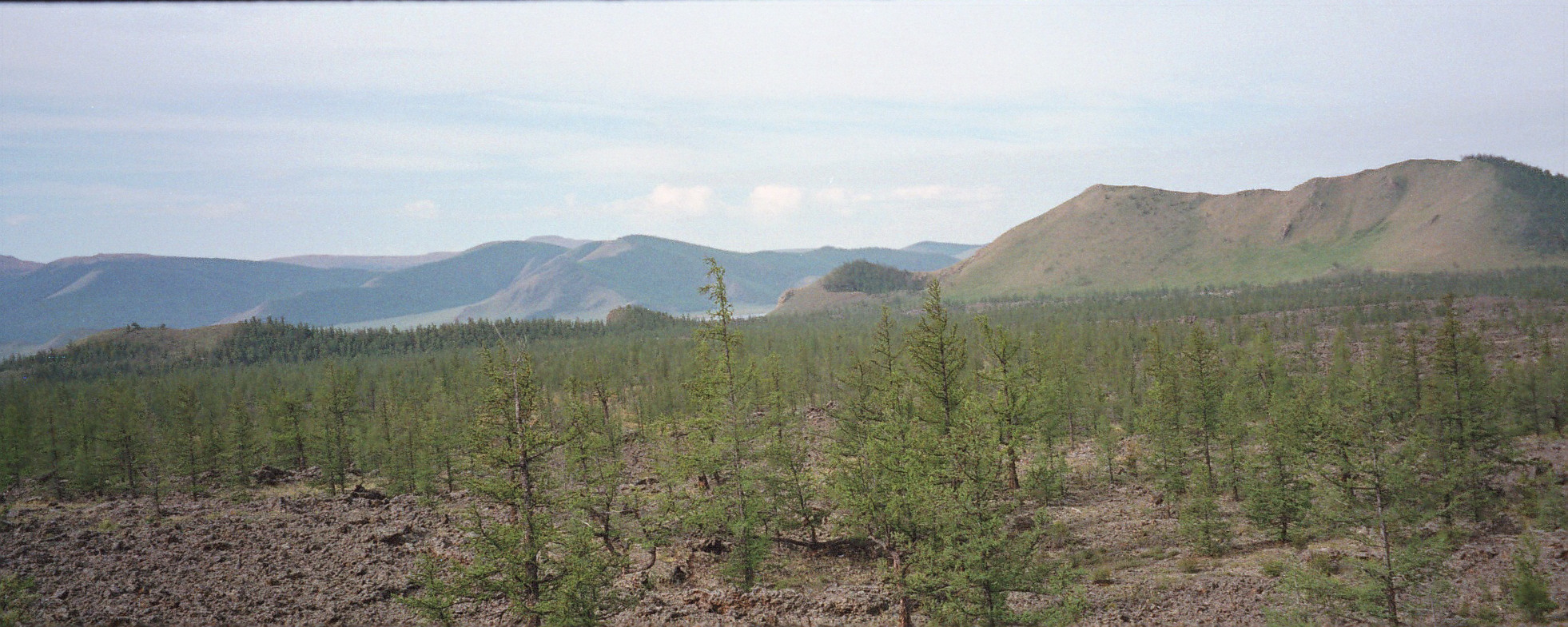
The volcanic field

Taryatu-Chulutu or Tariat Chuluut (Mongolian: Тариатын чулуут [tʰɛrʲɛtʰíɴ t͡ɕʰʊɮʊ́tʰ] – lit. 'Tariat Stones') is a volcanic field in Mongolia. It is part of a volcanic area in Central Asia in the Hangai range that may be linked to the rifting of the Lake Baikal Rift. The field itself is located within the valleys of the Chuluut and Suman rivers. Volcanic activity occurred in the Miocene, Pliocene, Pleistocene and Holocene. The Khorgo cinder cone erupted during the Holocene and lava flows from it formed a lava dam generating Terkhiin Tsagaan Nuur lake.

== Geological context ==
The volcanic field lies in the Taryatu depression, on the northern slope of the Hangai range. There, the field spans the river valleys of the Chuluut River, its tributary Gichigin and the Suman River rivers. The field is sometimes named Tariat volcanic field after the town of Tariat. Rivers frequently run in canyons bordered by lava plains.

Tectonically, the field is located within the Tarvagatay terrane which formed 3,000–200 mya ago and between 1,000 and 250 mya was accreted into the Central Asian Orogenic Belt. This terrane is formed by amphibolite, gneiss, migmatite and schist. An anorthosite pluton has yielded ages of 3,050 mya and is the oldest age from this terrane. Following stabilization of the whole Hangai region in the Paleozoic, only in the late Cenozoic did tectonic activity recommence.

Volcanism in this field appears to be related to volcanism which is widespread in this part of Asia. Localized asthenosphere upwellings may be responsible for these volcanic events at Hangai and other volcanic centres around Lake Baikal. Other theories for the Hangai postulate a mantle plume or the removal of part of the lithosphere by asthenospheric currents. Magnetotelluric analysis has found evidence of mantle upwelling.

== Geology ==
The volcanism is exposed in river terraces of the Chulutu river. The 130–200 metres (430–660 ft) terraces formed during the Miocene and the 100–120 metres (330–390 ft) terraces in the Pliocene. Lava sheets in the lower two thirds of the Pliocene layers are thicker than the upper lava flows. The 60 metres (200 ft) terrace of the Chulutu river and the 40–60 metres (130–200 ft) terraces in the Taryatu river are of Pleistocene age. This sequence reaches thicknesses of 40–90 metres (130–300 ft). In the Miocene–Pliocene a major lava plateau was formed on the eastern end of the Taryat depression, with a surface area of 24 by 15 kilometres (14.9 mi × 9.3 mi). The depression itself however does not appear to contain lavas from this plateau. Between 0.75 and 0.36 mya the Taryat–Chulutyn lava river was erupted from several Pleistocene–Holocene centres and grew to a length of c. 100 kilometres (62 mi). Within the depression it has a width of 6 kilometres (3.7 mi), a thickness of 90 metres (300 ft) and a length of c. 50 kilometres (31 mi).

Shavaryn-Tsaram forms a breccia and pyroclastic deposit accompanied by a lava flow following the valley bottom, 10 kilometres (6.2 mi) south of the Suman river. The pyroclastic deposit covers a surface area of 600 by 800 metres (2,000 ft × 2,600 ft). It is not clear if the lava flow and the pyroclastic deposit were formed by the same volcanic eruption.

In the western part of the depression, six Holocene cinder cones are found which have generated lava flows. These lava flows have thicknesses of 3–5 metres (9.8–16.4 ft). These cones include Khorog and Dzan Tologai. An arcuate chain of volcanoes named Odnobokii, Listvennichnyi, and Sosnovyi is found directly southwest of Khorog/Khorgo. The first volcano has a crater lip in its side, while the other two volcanoes are partly buried in lava flows. These lava flows show sag structures formed by the collapse of lava tubes.

Khorog/Khorgo has a dimension of 1,200 metres (3,900 ft) base diameter and a height of 120 metres (390 ft). On top of the cone sits a 180 metres (590 ft) wide crater. Among the components of the cone are scoria and large blocks of basalt. The cone is breached at the location of a lava tube. Its eruption also generated an eastward pointing ash deposit with thicknesses of 3–5 metres (9.8–16.4 ft). It also contains lapilli and lava bombs with dimensions of 0.5–1 metre (1 ft 8 in – 3 ft 3 in). Very little soil is developed on the Khorgo lavas. Lavas from this cone dammed a river, generating the Terkhiin Tsagaan Lake (although there is evidence of a former lake there, dammed by earlier eruptions). The eruption of Khorgo was probably fed from a north-northeast striking eruption fissure. Other vents in the area are Bosko, Haer, Shava, Shute, Tsagan and Zala.

=== Composition ===
Augitite, potassic limburgite, pyroxene trachybasalts and trachyte–andesite are found in the Pliocene layers. Potassic basanite and limburgite are found in the Pleistocene layers. Holocene layers contain augitite, leucite basanite, potassic hawaiite and leucite tephrite. Horgo/Khorgo is constructed from phonolitic tephrite and its lavas range alkali basalt-basanite. There is a clear trend in increasing K_{2}O and alkali content during the Pleistocene and the Holocene, indicating together with the xenolith content that the origin of these recent basalts is deep.

Xenoliths are also found in the Pliocene layers and are composed of peridotite, sanidine and spinel-lherzolite. Pleistocene layers contain ultramafic xenoliths, with the youngest Holocene flows containing the largest amounts. Shavaryn-Tsaram is particularly well known as a source of xenoliths. In the 1970s and 1980s this volcano was prospected and mined for garnets.

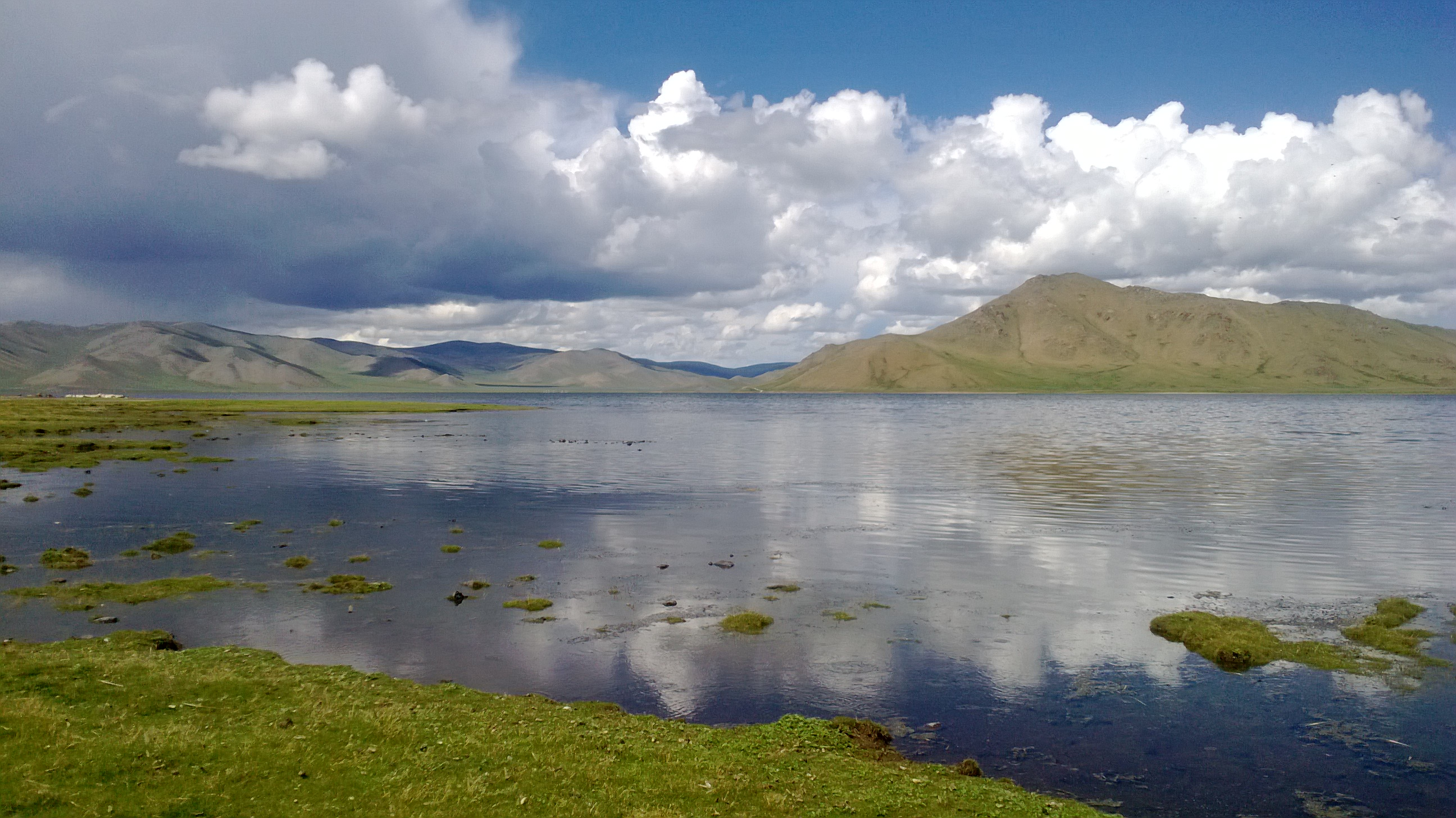
The Terkhiin Tsagaan Lake was dammed by Holocene lavas from Khorgo cone.

=== Eruptive history ===
Volcanic activity in the field ranges from Pliocene to Holocene, commencing about 8 mya ago. The Shavaryn-Tsaram volcano has an age of 1.2 mya. The Tariat valley flows were emplaced between 240,000 and 60,000 years ago. Seismic tomography has identified traces of a former magmatic intrusion under the volcanic field. The total volume of lava is less than 300 cubic kilometres (72 cu mi).

The Khorgo/Horgo cinder cones was considered to be about 4 ka old, ^{14}C dating on organic material in its sediments has indicated ages of 8 ka. The Global Volcanism Program indicates a date of 2980 BCE ± 150 years. The most recent research indicates a date of 7,200 years ago. Some geologists have correlated the activity of Paektusan, Udokan Plateau and Wudalianchi volcanoes elsewhere in Asia and have presumed that common geologic events did influence the activity of all three centres. Tsagan may be younger than Khorgo.

== Environment ==
Khorgo volcano is 530 kilometres (330 mi) west of Ulaanbaatar. It is part of the Khorgo-Terkhiin Tsagaan Nuur National Park, which was established in 1965 and is a major tourism destination. Most precipitation in the area falls during summer. The national park (48°8′N 99°38′E) has a surface area of 773 square kilometres (298 sq mi) and lies at an altitude of 2,060 metres (6,760 ft). The Terkhiin Tsagaan Lake is an important food source for migratory waterfowl and has a surface area of 268 square kilometres (103 sq mi).
