= Gobi Lakes Valley desert steppe =

Ecoregion in Mongolia

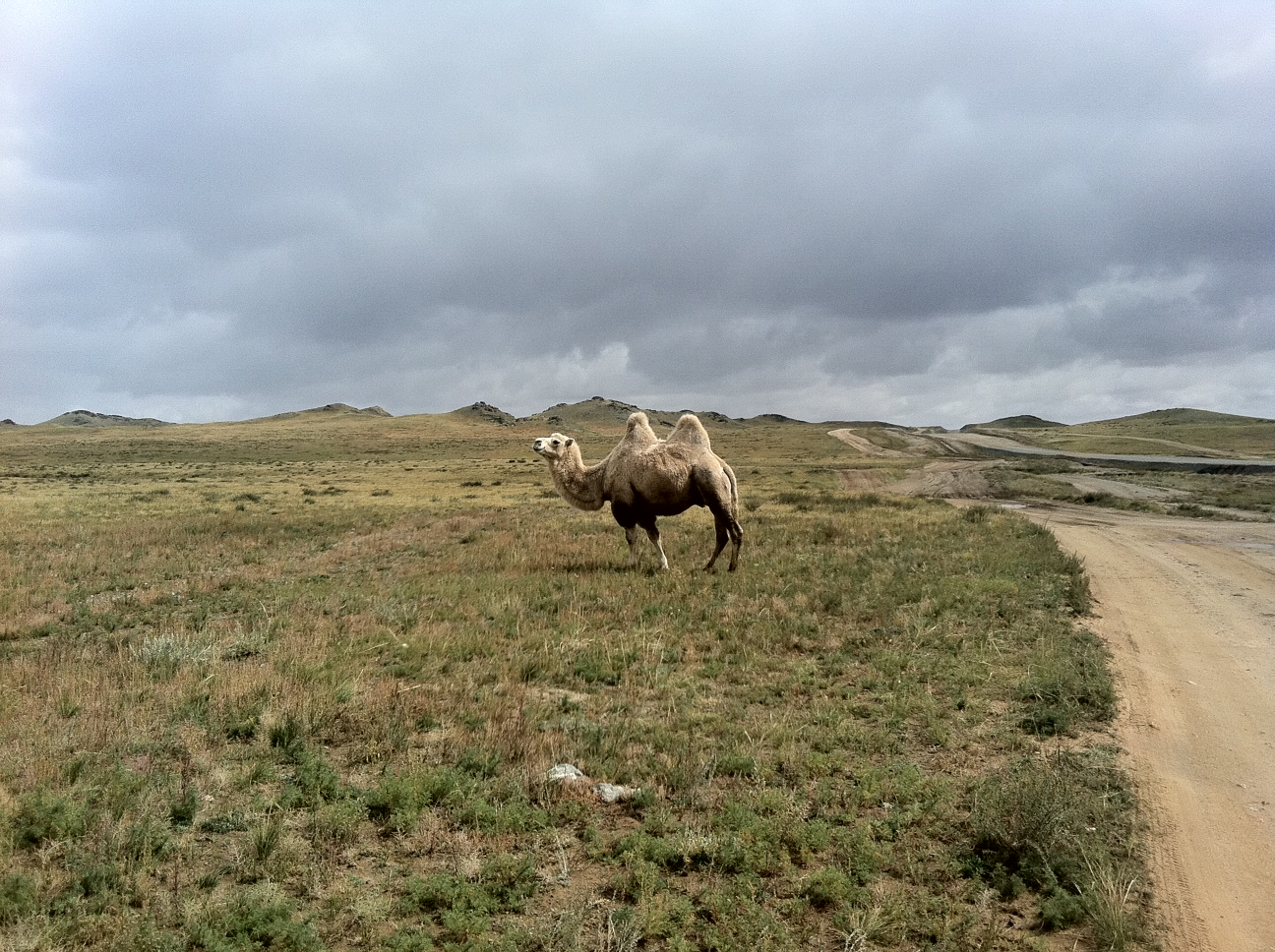
- Albino camel in Bayankhongor Province, Mongolia

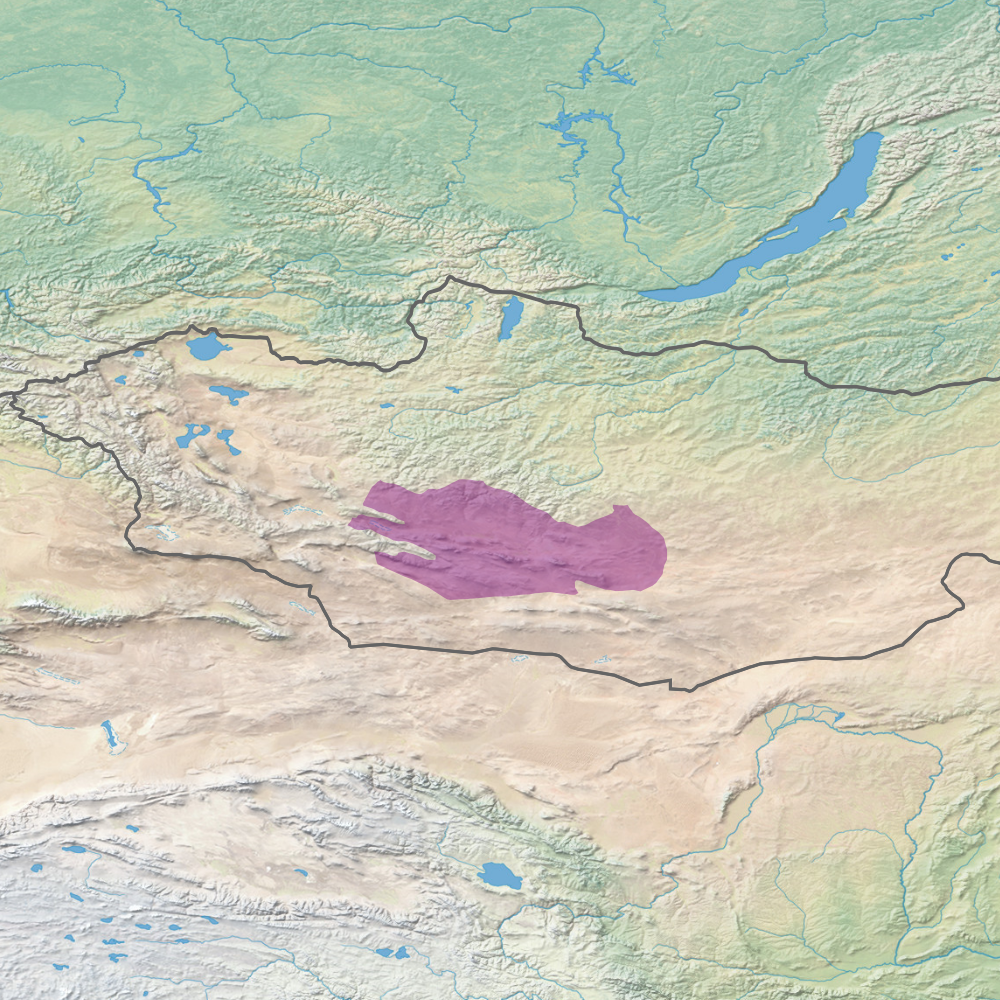
- Ecoregion territory (in purple)

Ecology
- Realm: Palearctic
- Biome: Deserts and xeric shrublands

Geography
- Area: 139,341 km^{2} (53,800 sq mi)
- Country: Mongolia
- Coordinates: 45°50′N 101°0′E

The Gobi Lakes Valley desert steppe ecoregion (WWF ID: PA1315) covers the narrow, flat valley in southwestern Mongolia that lies between the Khangai Mountains (to the north), and the Gobi-Altai Mountains (to the south). The region is known as the "Valley of the Lakes" because runoff from the mountains collect in lakes that have no outlet to the sea. Although the valley is a semi-arid desert steppe, it has areas of wetlands near the lakes that are important habit for water birds.

== Location and description ==
The Gobi Lakes Valley is about 500 km (310 mi) west-to-east, and 150 km (93 mi) north-to south, at elevations of 1,000–1,400 metres (3,300–4,600 ft). The region is desert steppe, with rivers from the Khangai Mountains on the north providing most of the water to the lakes. On the south the region is bounded by the Gobi-Altai range, the easternmost extension of the Altai. A chain of shallow, saline lakes include Böön Tsagaan Lake (Lake Buuntsaagan), Taatsiin Tsagaan Lake, Adgiin Tsagaan Nuur, and Lake Orog. The lake's depths fluctuate with the variable precipitation. Some have large wetlands where the waters recede.

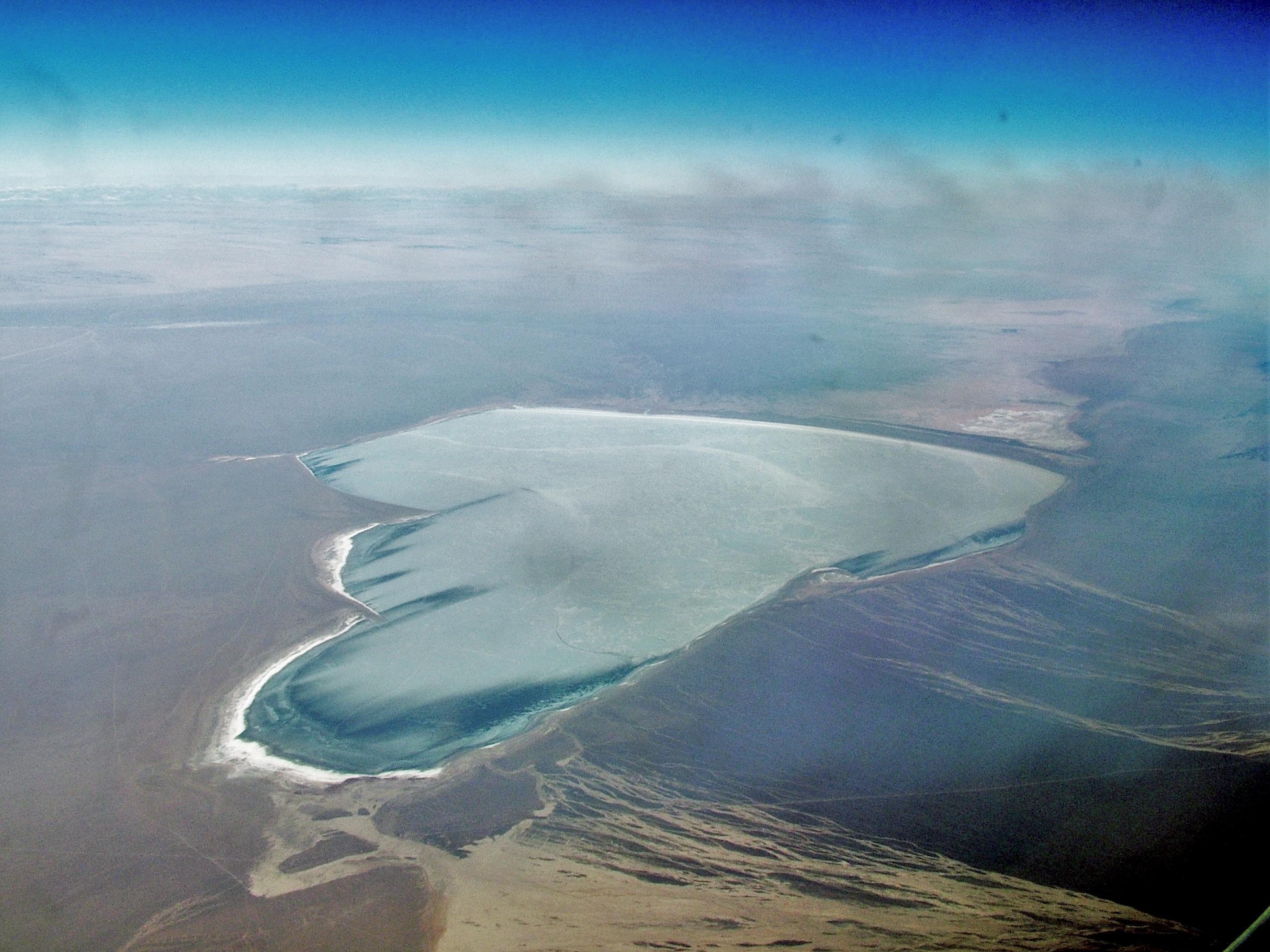
Lake Buuntsaagan from the air

== Climate ==
The climate of the ecoregion is Cold semi-arid climate (Köppen climate classification BSk). This climate is characteristic of steppe climates intermediary between desert humid climates, and typically have precipitation is above evapotranspiration. At least one month averages below 0 °C (32 °F). Annual precipitation ranges from 50 to 200 mm.

== Flora and fauna ==
Dominant plants of the desert steppe include feather grass (Stipa gobica), wild onion (Allium polyrhizum), anabasis, and ajania. Around the lakes are shrubs such as Caragana and salt-tolerant Salsola and saxaul (Haloxylon ammodendron). Water birds in the wetlands include the great cormorant, greylag goose, ruddy shelduck, mallard and Eurasian coot. Small mammals throughout the region include the midday jird, Gobi jerboa (a rodent of temperate grasslands and deserts), winter white dwarf hamster, and long-eared hedgehog (Erinaceus).

== See also ==
- List of ecoregions in Mongolia
