= Khorgo-Terkhiin Tsagaan Nuur National Park =

National park in Mongolia

- Mongolian: Тэрхийн Цагаан нуур
- IUCN category II (national park)
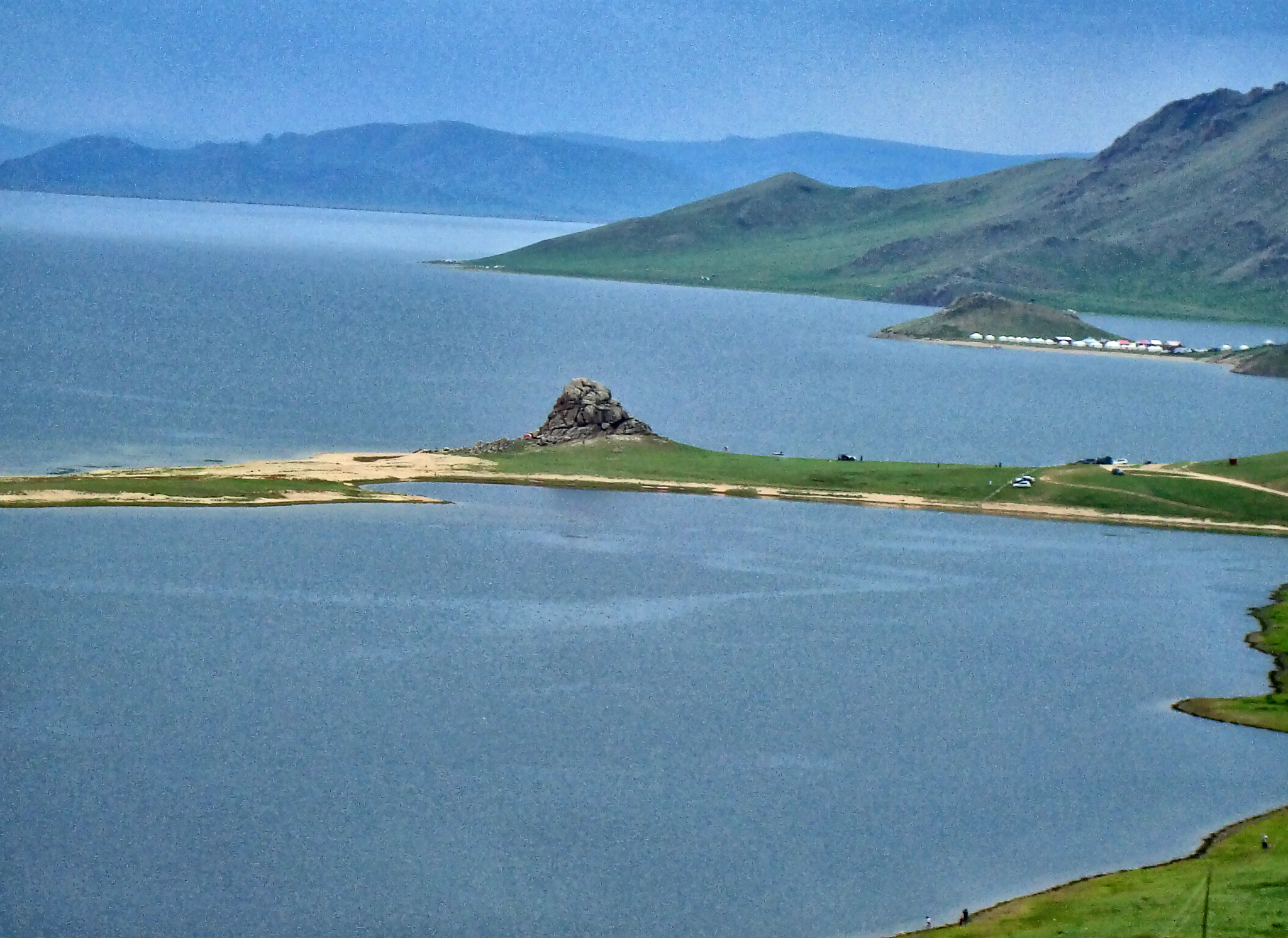
- Terkhijn Tsagaan Lake

- Location within Mongolia
- Location: Arkhangai, Mongolia
- Coordinates: 48.2°N 99.8°E
- Area: 773 hectares (1,910 acres; 8 km^{2}; 3 sq mi)
- Established: 1965
- Governing body: Ministry of Environment and Green Development of Mongolia

Khorgo-Terkhiin Tsagaan Nuur National Park (Mongolian: Тэрхийн Цагаан нуур) covers the picturesque Terkhiin Tsagaan Lake and the nearby Khorgo Mountain (a recently extinct volcano) in the north central Khangai Mountains in Arkhangai Province, Mongolia. The marshes along the west end of the lake are an important breeding and staging area for birds. The park is located in Tariat District of Arkhangai Province.

== Topography ==
The park is situated in the valley of the Chuluut River and Suman River in the Tarvagatai Range of the Khangai Mountains. Lake Terkhiin Tsagaain is a freshwater, oligotrophic lake in a volcanically-formed valley. The terrain immediately around the lake is hills with steppe and forest steppe vegetation. The lake is about 15 km long. It has a maximum depth of 20 meters, with 40% being less than 2 meters deep.

Khorgo Mountain is about 4 km east of the lake, in the Taryatu-Chulutu valley, a volcanic field. Khorgo experienced a significant eruption in approximately 8,000 BCE.

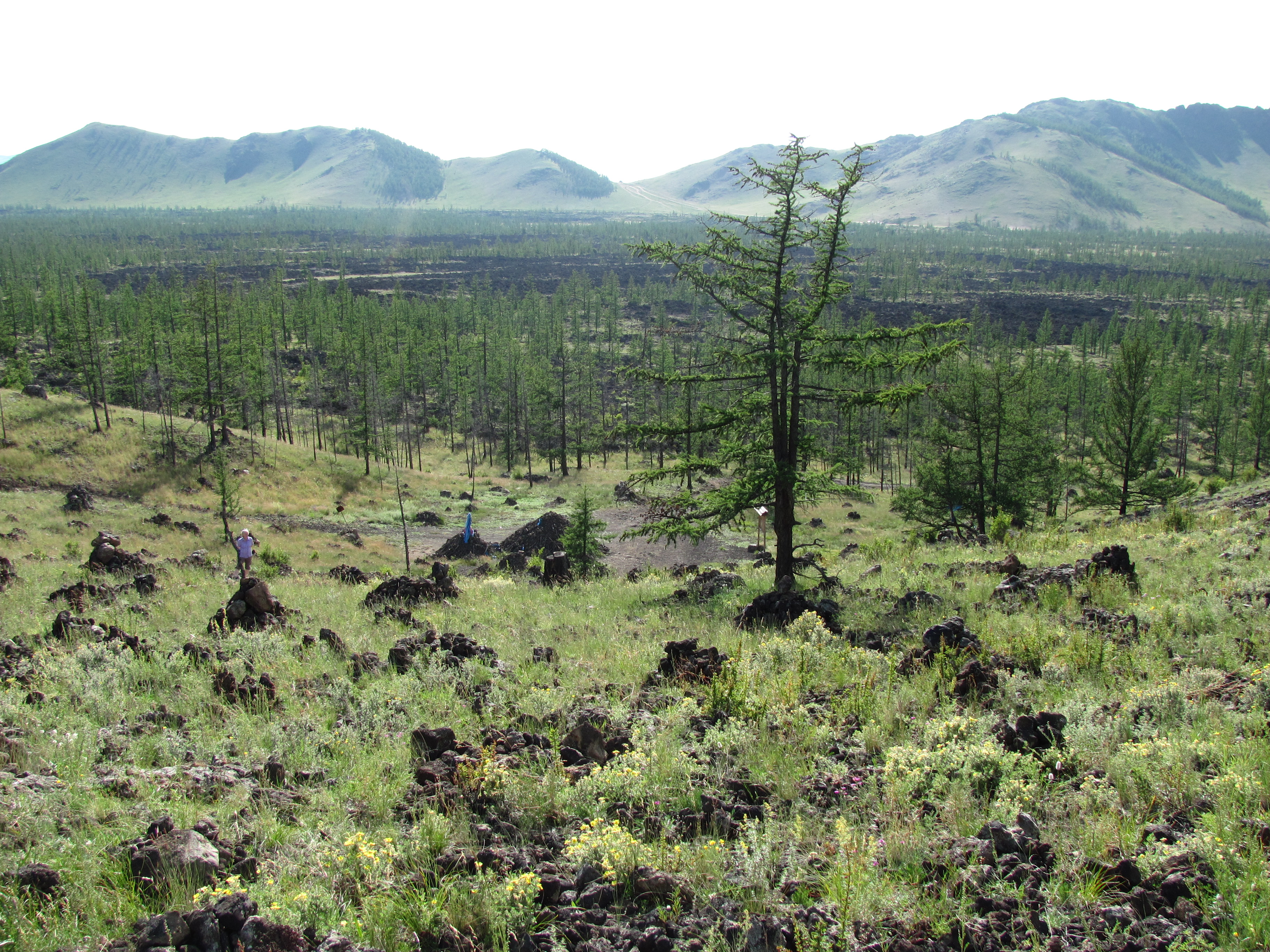
View of the lava field from Khorgo Mountain

== Climate and ecoregion ==
The climate of the area is Cold semi-arid climate (Köppen climate classification (BSk)). This climate is characteristic of steppe climates intermediary between desert humid climates, and typically have precipitation is above evapotranspiration. At least one month averages below 0 °C (32 °F). Annual precipitation averages 100–100 mm, with 80% of that falling in July and August. The park is in the Selenge-Orkhon forest steppe ecoregion.

== Flora and fauna ==
The fish in the lake are typical northern Eurasian species - cyprinids (Cyprinidae), pike and perch. Birds breeding in the marshes along the lake's edge include Bar-headed goose (Anser indicus), Ruddy shelduck (Tadorna ferruginea), and Red-breasted merganser (Mergus serrator).

== See also ==
- List of national parks of Mongolia
