= Valley of the Lakes =

Coordinates: 45°19′N 99°58′E

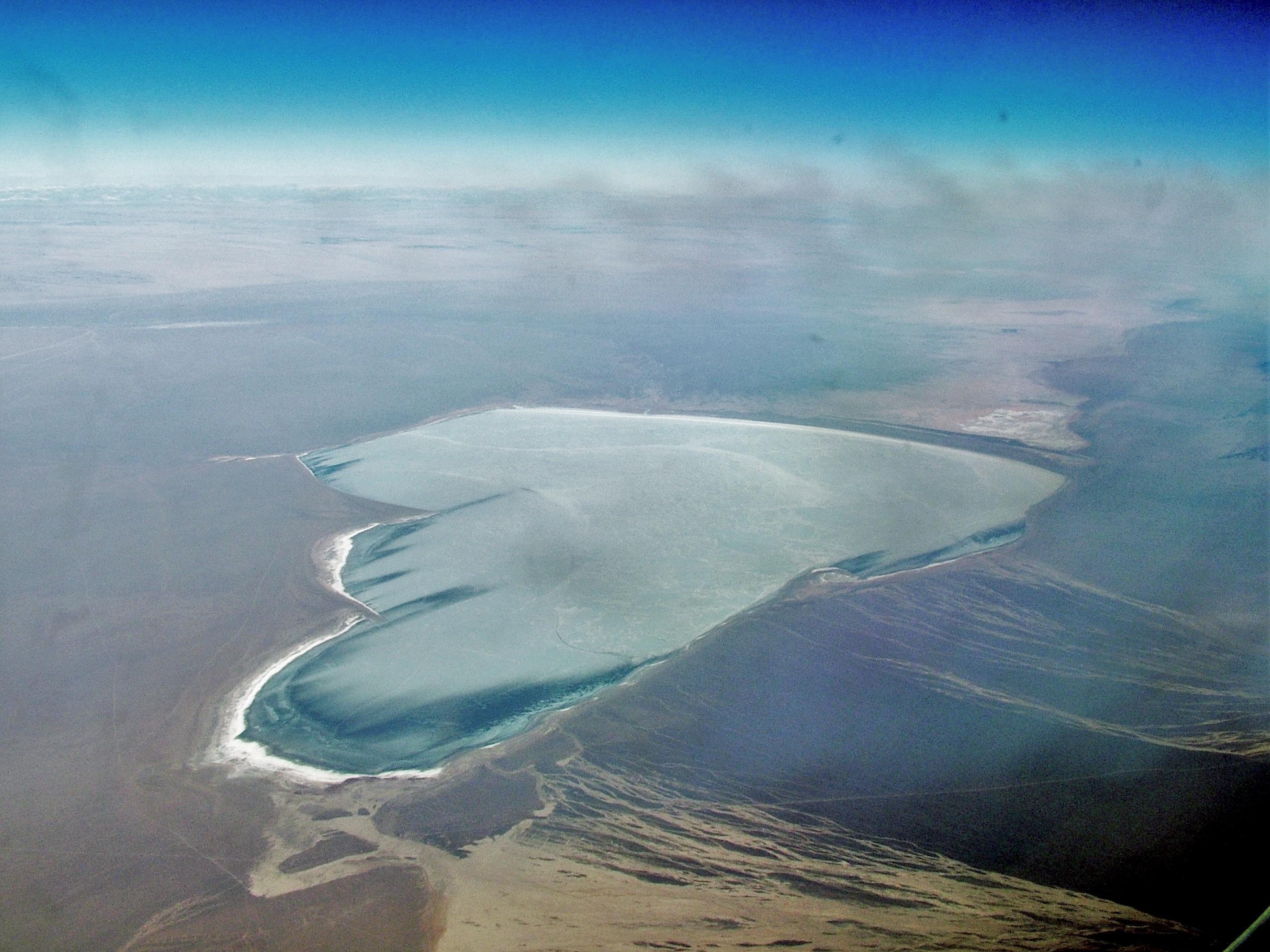
- Böön Tsagaan Lake

- Location within Mongolia
- Location: Bayankhongor aimag, Mongolia
- Coordinates: t
- Area: 45,600 ha (456 km^{2}; 176 mi^{2})

Ramsar Wetland
- Official name: Valley of Lakes
- Designated: 6 July 1998
- Reference no.: 954

The Valley of the Lakes (Mongolian: Нууруудын хөндий) is an intermontane depression located in southwestern Mongolia, separating the Khangai and Govi-Altai mountains. The valley stretches 500 km long, has a width of approximately 100 km, and is located at altitudes ranging between 1000 and 1400 meters above sea level. The topography is dominated by sandy and rocky plains, with solonchak and takir soils present. Along the valley floor lies a chain of large and small saline lakes, which are generally shallow, with a saucer-shaped depth profile. The largest of these lakes are Böön Tsagaan Lake and Orog Lake. Water levels vary considerably in size both seasonally and from year to year, and some lakes may dry out completely in certain years. They all receive their inflow from rivers which rise in the Khangai Mountains, and no permanent inflow comes from the Gobi-Altai. Barchan sand dunes are located on the valley's margins. The region near the Govi-Altai is a seismically active zone and is where the 1957 Mongolia earthquake occurred.

Lakes of Gobi Valley are known to be an important staging for migratory waterfowl, particularly Anatidae and shorebirds, but few details are available. As the lakes shrink in summer, it leaves areas of salt marsh, especially to the east of the lake. The fish fauna includes species of Oreoleuciscus and Thymallus brevirostris endemic to the western Mongolia.

The valley was first explored scientifically by the geographer Nikolay Przhevalsky. In 1998, the whole valley region (including Böön Tsagaan Lake, Taatsiin Tsagaan Lake, Adgiin Tsagaan Lake, and Orog Lake) was designated a Ramsar site of international importance.

== See also ==
- Gobi Lakes Valley desert steppe
- Ramsar sites in Mongolia
