= List of Ramsar sites in Mongolia =

Mongolia joined the Ramsar Convention on Wetlands of International Importance Especially as Waterfowl Habitat on April 8, 1998. There are currently 11 wetlands designated as Ramsar sites in Mongolia.

== List ==
Name	Location	Area (km^{2})	Designated	Description	Image
Mongol Daguur	49°42′N 115°6′E	2100	1997		
Valley of the Lakes	45°19′N 99°58′E	456	1998	The valley includes the four saline lakes of Böön Tsagaan Lake, Taatsiin Tsagaan Lake, Adgiin Tsagaan Lake and Orog Lake that provide a staging area for migratory waterfowl.	
Ögii Lake	47°46′N 102°46′E	25.1	1998		
Terkhiin Tsagaan Lake	48°10′N 99°43′E	61.1	1998		
Airag Lake	48°53′N 93°25′E	450	1999		
Khar-Us Lake National Park	47°58′N 92°50′E	3213.6	1999		
Achit Lake and surrounding wetlands	49°40′N 90°35′E	737.3	2004		
Buir Lake and surrounding wetlands	47°48′N 117°40′E	1040	2004		
Ganga Lake and surrounding wetlands	45°15′N 114°00′E	32.8	2004		
Uvs Lake and surrounding wetlands	50°20′N 92°45′E	5850	2004		
Lakes in the Khurkh-Khüiten river valley	48°18′N 110°34′E	429.4	2004		

== See also ==
- Ramsar Convention
- List of Ramsar sites worldwide
