= Geology of Christmas Island =

The geology of Christmas Island includes interbedded sequences of carbonates and volcanic rocks formed during the Eocene and Miocene. Reef-wall and lagoonal origin dolomite and limestone are particularly common, along with phosphates such as crandallite, millisite, formed from laterite weathering and apatite and barrandite formed through chemical replacement. Most volcanic rocks are basic and include andesite and limburgite.
