= Achit Lake =

Lake in Mongolia

Achit Lake ᠠᠴᠢᠲᠤ ᠨᠠᠭᠤᠷ
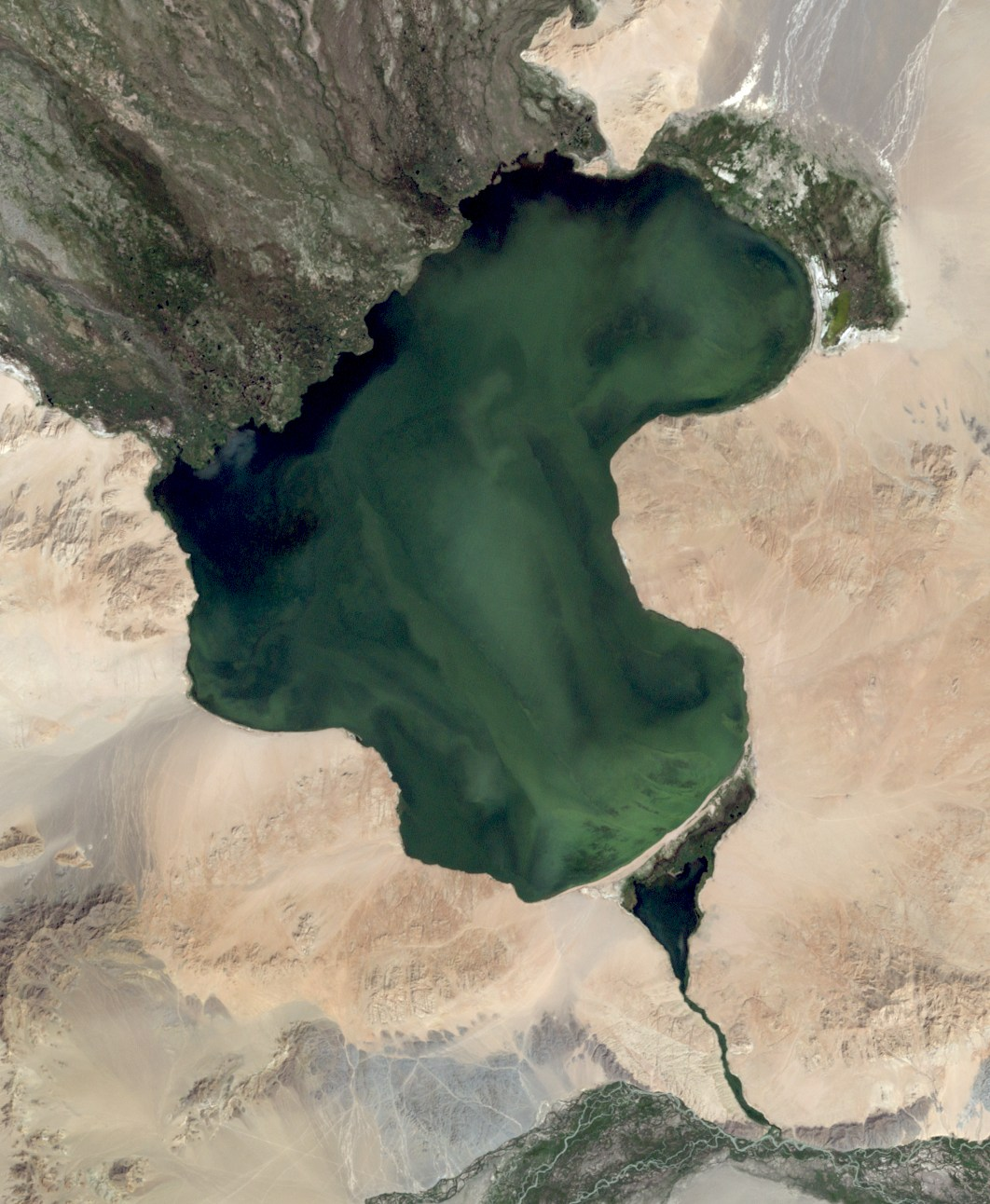
- Achit Lake satellite image (Landsat-7, 2007-08-13)

- Location within Mongolia
- Location: Uvs Aimag
- Coordinates: 49°30′N 90°30′E
- Basin countries: Mongolia
- Max. length: 28 km (17 mi)
- Max. width: 16 km (9.9 mi)
- Surface area: 290 km^{2} (110 sq mi)
- Surface elevation: 1,435 m (4,708 ft)

Ramsar Wetland
- Official name: Lake Achit and its surrounding wetlands
- Designated: 22 March 2004
- Reference no.: 1376

Achit Lake (/ˈætʃɪt/; Mongolian: Ачит нуур [átɕʰɪtʰ nʊ́ːr]) is a freshwater lake in Bayan-Ölgii Province and Uvs Province, Mongolia, in the west of the country. At an elevation of 1,435 m above sea level it covers an area of 290 km^{2}. It is 28 km long, 16 km wide, and 10 m deep. The coast is covered with steppes, mostly hilly but swampy on the northwest and northeast. Several rivers flow into the lake.

== See also ==
- Ramsar sites in Mongolia
