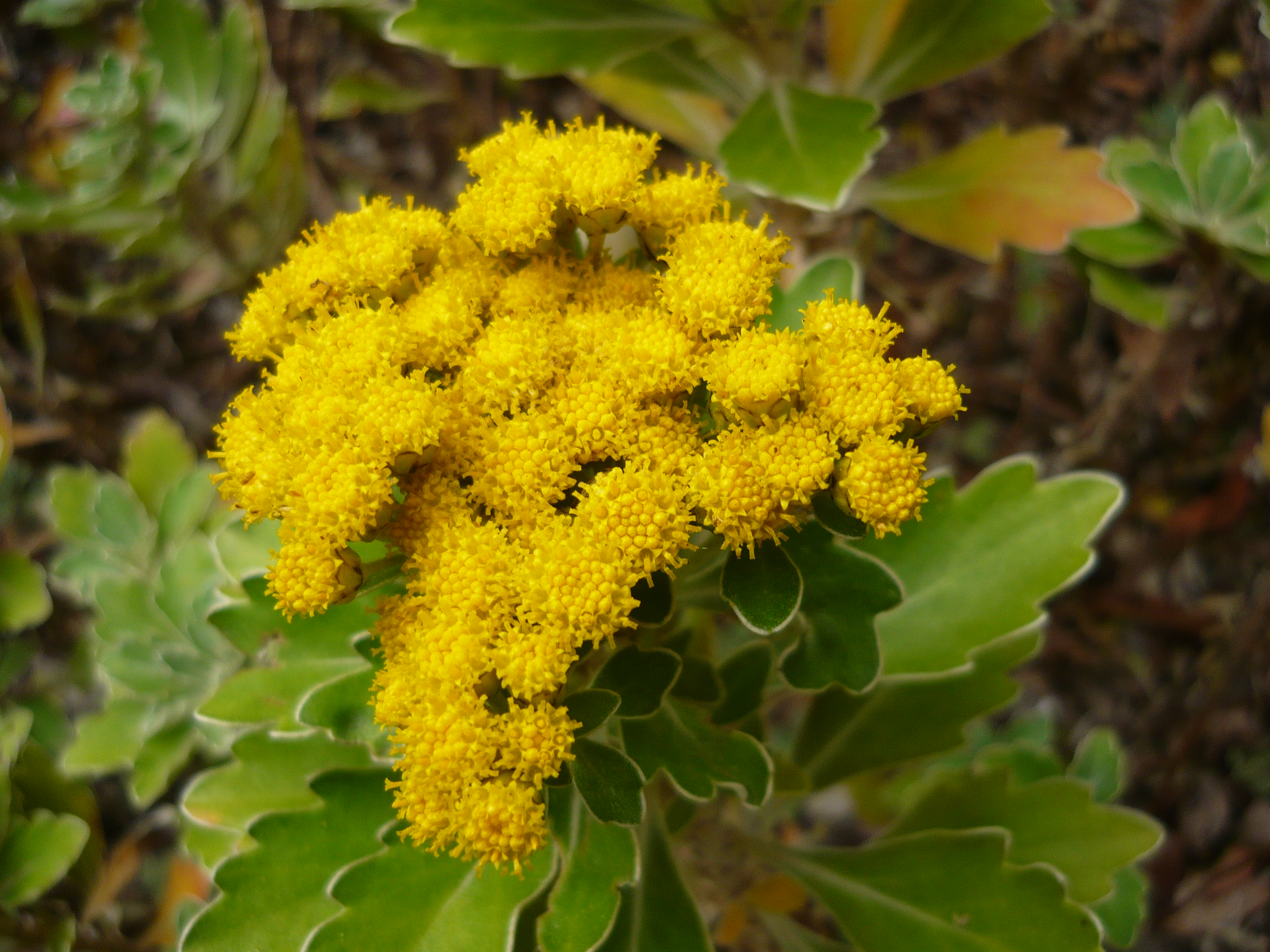
- Ajania pacifica

Scientific classification
- Kingdom: Plantae
- Clade: Tracheophytes
- Clade: Angiosperms
- Clade: Eudicots
- Clade: Asterids
- Order: Asterales
- Family: Asteraceae
- Subfamily: Asteroideae
- Tribe: Anthemideae
- Genus: Ajania; Poljakov

Type species
- Ajania pallasiana (F. E. L. Fischer ex W. G. Besser) P. P. Poljakov

Synonyms
- Cryanthemum Kamelin; Phaeostigma Muldashev

= Ajania =

Genus of flowering plants

Ajania is a genus of flowering plants in the daisy family, described as a genus in 1955. The genus is native to temperate Asia, primarily Russia and China. It is named after the Russian port city Ayan in the Khabarovsk Krai region of the Russian Far East, on the coast of the Sea of Okhotsk.

== Species ==
As of August 2020, Kew's Plants of the World Online accepts 43 species in the genus Ajania:

- Ajania abolinii Kovalevsk.
- Ajania achilleoides Poljakov ex Grubov
- Ajania adenanthum (Diels) Y.Ling & C.Shih
- Ajania alabasica H.C.Fu
- Ajania amphiseriacea (Hand.-Mazz.) C.Shih
- Ajania brachyantha C.Shih
- Ajania breviloba (Franch. ex Hand.-Mazz.) Y.Ling & C.Shih
- Ajania elegantula (W.W.Sm.) C.Shih
- Ajania fastigiata (C.Winkl.) Poljakov
- Ajania fruticulosa (Ledeb.) Poljakov
- Ajania gracilis (Hook.f. & Thomson) Poljakov ex Tzvelev
- Ajania grubovii Muldashev
- Ajania hypoleuca Ling ex C.Shih
- Ajania junnanica Poljakov
- Ajania khartensis (Dunn) C.Shih
- Ajania korovinii Kovalevsk.
- Ajania latifolia C.Shih
- Ajania myriantha (Franch.) Ling ex C.Shih
- Ajania nematoloba (Hand.-Mazz.) Y.Ling & C.Shih
- Ajania nitida C.Shih
- Ajania nubigena (Wall. ex DC.) Muldashev
- Ajania pacifica (Nakai) K.Bremer & Humphries
- Ajania pallasiana (Fisch. ex Besser) Poljakov
- Ajania parviflora (Grun.) Ling
- Ajania potaninii (Krasch.) Poljakov
- Ajania przewalskii Poljakov
- Ajania purpurea C.Shih
- Ajania quercifolia (W.W.Sm.) Y.Ling & C.Shih
- Ajania ramosa (C.C.Chang) C.Shih
- Ajania remotipinna (Hand.-Mazz.) Y.Ling & C.Shih
- Ajania rupestris (Matsum. & Koidz.) Muldashev
- Ajania salicifolia (Mattf.) Poljakov
- Ajania scharnhorstii (Regel & Schmalh.) Tzvelev
- Ajania semnanensis Sonboli
- Ajania sericea C.Shih
- Ajania shiwogiku (Kitam.) K.Bremer & Humphries
- Ajania tenuifolia (Jacquem. ex Besser) Tzvelev
- Ajania tibetica (Hook.f. & Thomson) Tzvelev
- Ajania trifida (Turcz.) Muldashev
- Ajania trilobata Poljakov
- Ajania tripinnatisecta Y.Ling & C.Shih
- Ajania truncata (Hand.-Mazz.) Ling ex C.Shih
- Ajania variifolia (C.C.Chang) Tzvelev
