= Terkhiin Tsagaan Lake =

Lake in Tariat, Arkhangai, Mongolia

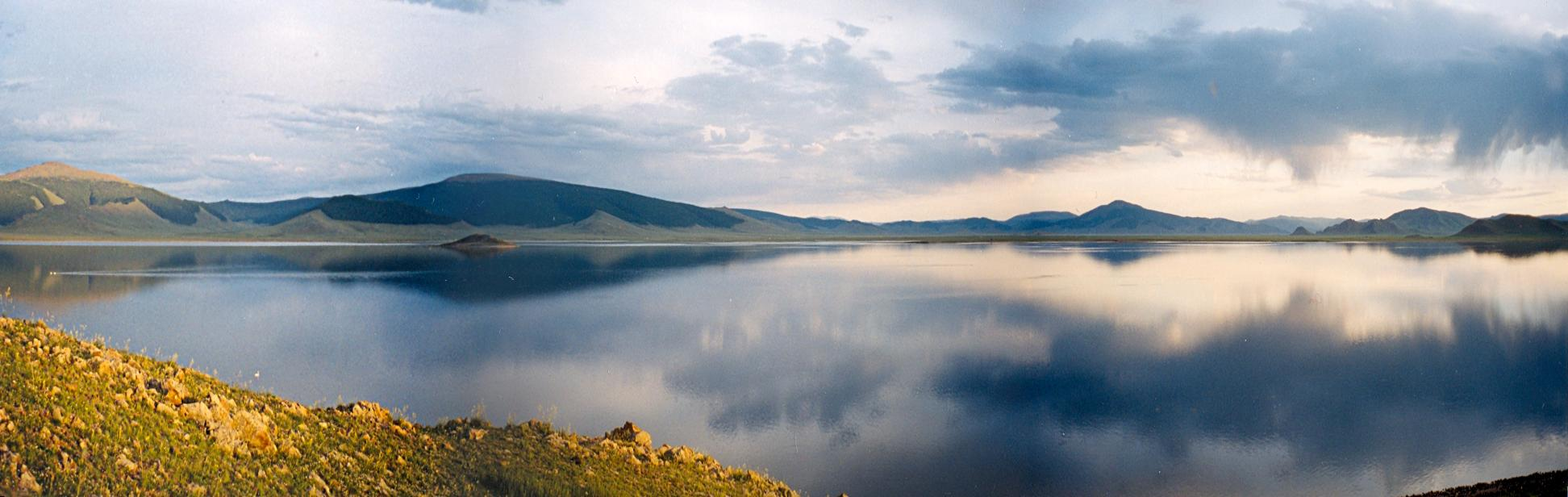

- Location within Mongolia
- Location: Tariat, Arkhangai, Mongolia
- Coordinates: 48°10′15″N 99°43′20″E
- Basin countries: Mongolia
- Max. length: 16 km (9.9 mi)
- Max. width: 4–10 km (2.5–6.2 mi)
- Surface area: 61 km^{2} (24 sq mi)
- Average depth: 20 m (66 ft)
- Surface elevation: 2,060 m (6,760 ft)

Ramsar Wetland
- Official name: Terhiyn Tsagaan Nuur
- Designated: 6 July 1998
- Reference no.: 953

Terkhiin Tsagaan Lake (Mongolian: Тэрхийн Цагаан нуур, IPA: [tʰerxíɴ t͡sʰaʁáɴ nʊ́ːr] ᠲᠡᠷᠬᠢᠶ ᠤᠨ ᠴᠠᠭᠠᠨ ᠨᠠᠭᠤᠷ terkiy-un čaɣan naɣur) is a freshwater lake in Tariat, Arkhangai, Mongolia. It flows through the Khangai Mountains. The lake is located 670 km from the capital city of Ulaanbaatar and 180 km from the center of Tariat.

The Khorgo volcano is located near the eastern end of the lake, 10 rivers join this lake and only the Suman River springs from it. The lake is located in Khorgo-Terkhiin Tsagaan Nuur National Park. According to the joint 2022 study of Mongolia's Ministry of Environment and Tourism and World Wide Fund for Nature, the area of the lake decreased by 6.4% from 7950.0 ha in 1995 to 7440.1 ha in 2015. This resulted in reduction of wetlands areas by 23.5% and increase by 39.4% of sands and eroded lands surrounding the lake.

== The Folk tale of Terkhiin Tsagaan Lake ==
An ancient time, a mother and son were living this land and they carried their drink water from small fountain from the deep of ground. After they take some water they have to bung it. But one day son went to this fountain to take drink water but he forgot to bung it after take and he slept next to the fountain. Later some minutes this some area covered by huge water and son's mother worried about his son and she take top of mountain named "Uran mandal", bung the fountain. Since that time this lake is exist here. The top of "Uran mandal" mountain is Small Island that mentioned above.

== Gallery ==
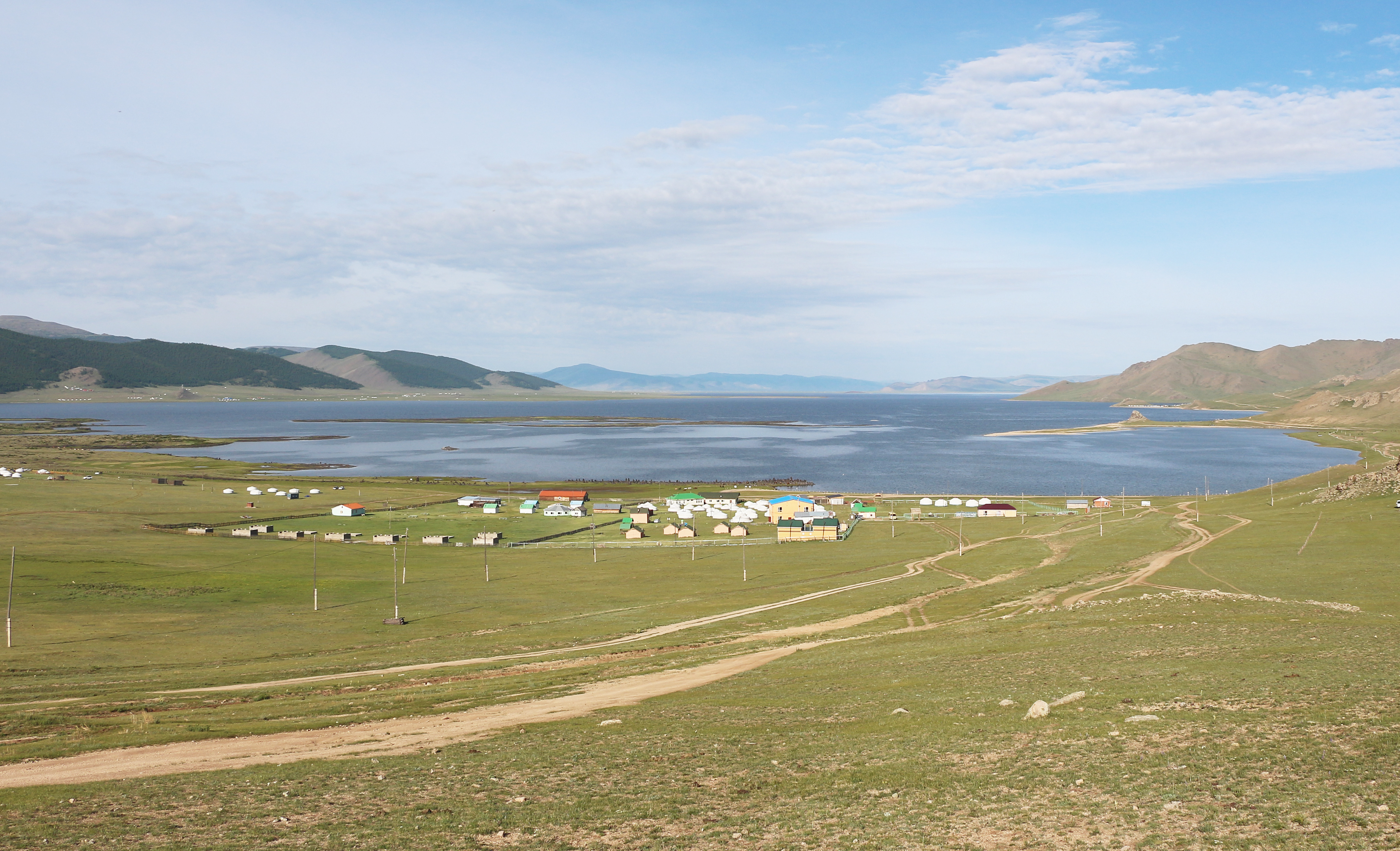

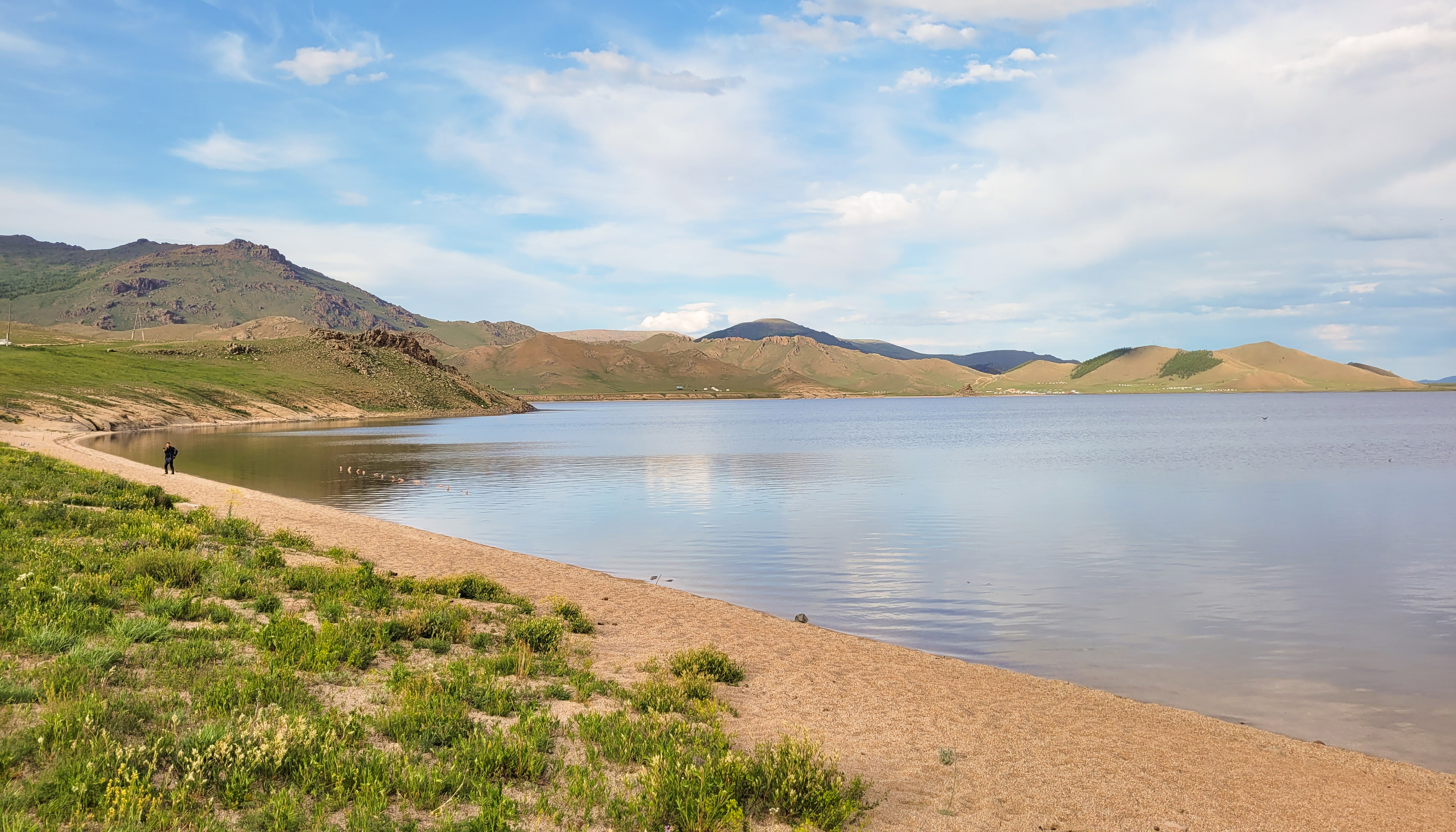

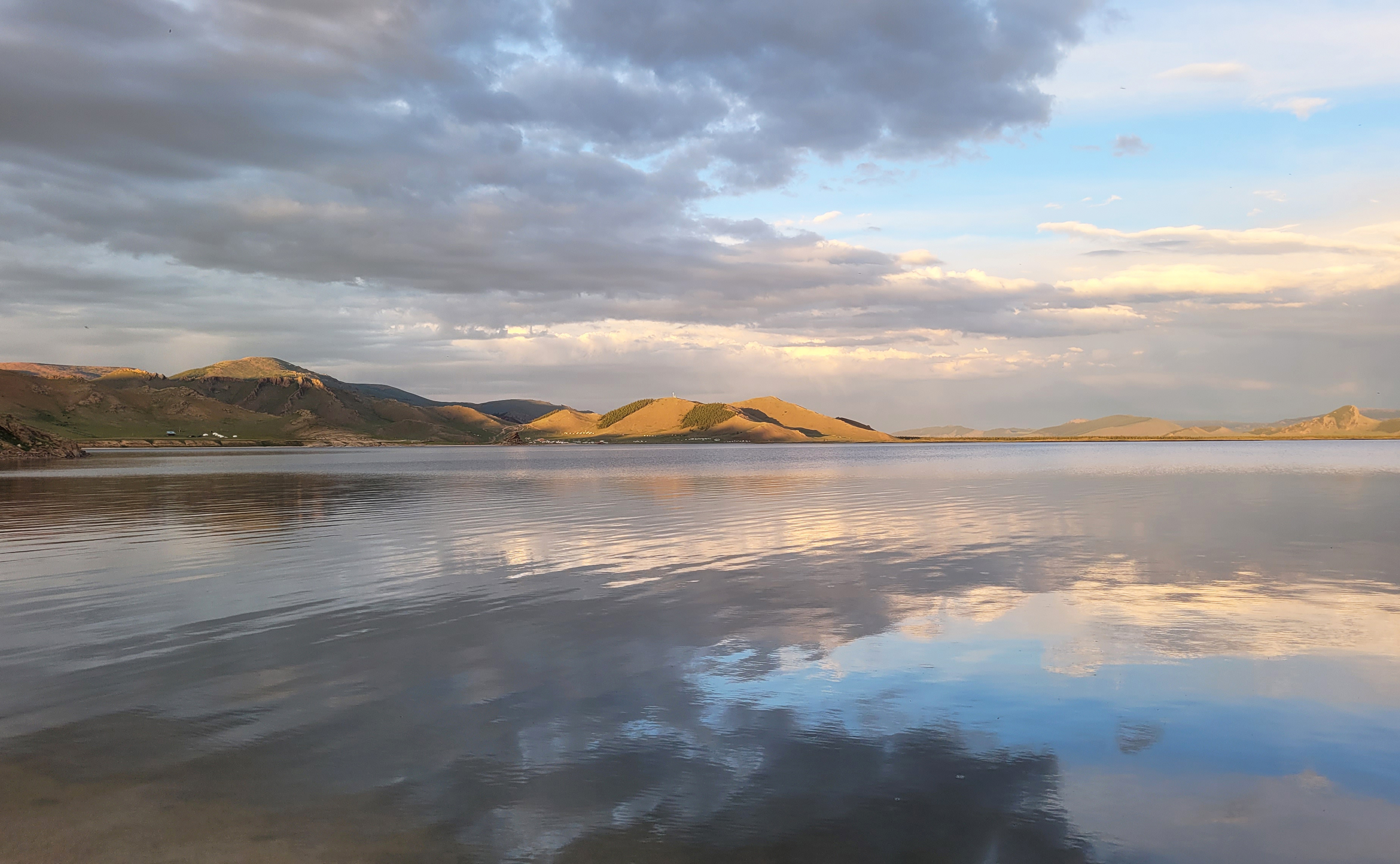

== See also ==
- Taryatu-Chulutu
- Тэрхийн цагаан нуур mn:Тэрхийн цагаан нуур
- Олон улсын ач холбогдол бyхий ус, намгархаг газар: Тэрхийн цагаан нуур, 2022 (Wetlands of international importance: Terkhin tsagaan lake, 2022)
