= Ajania grubovii =

Scientific classification
- Kingdom: Plantae
- Clade: Embryophytes
- Clade: Tracheophytes
- Clade: Angiosperms
- Clade: Eudicots
- Clade: Asterids
- Order: Asterales
- Family: Asteraceae
- Genus: Ajania
- Species: A. grubovii

Binomial name
- Ajania grubovii Muldashev

Synonyms
- Chrysanthemum grubovii (Muldashev) H.Ohashi & Yonek.

Species of flowering plant

Ajania grubovii is a species of flowering plant in the family Asteraceae, endemic to Mongolia. It has the Anthemis pollen type.
