= Taatsiin Tsagaan Lake =

Lake in Övörkhangai, Mongolia

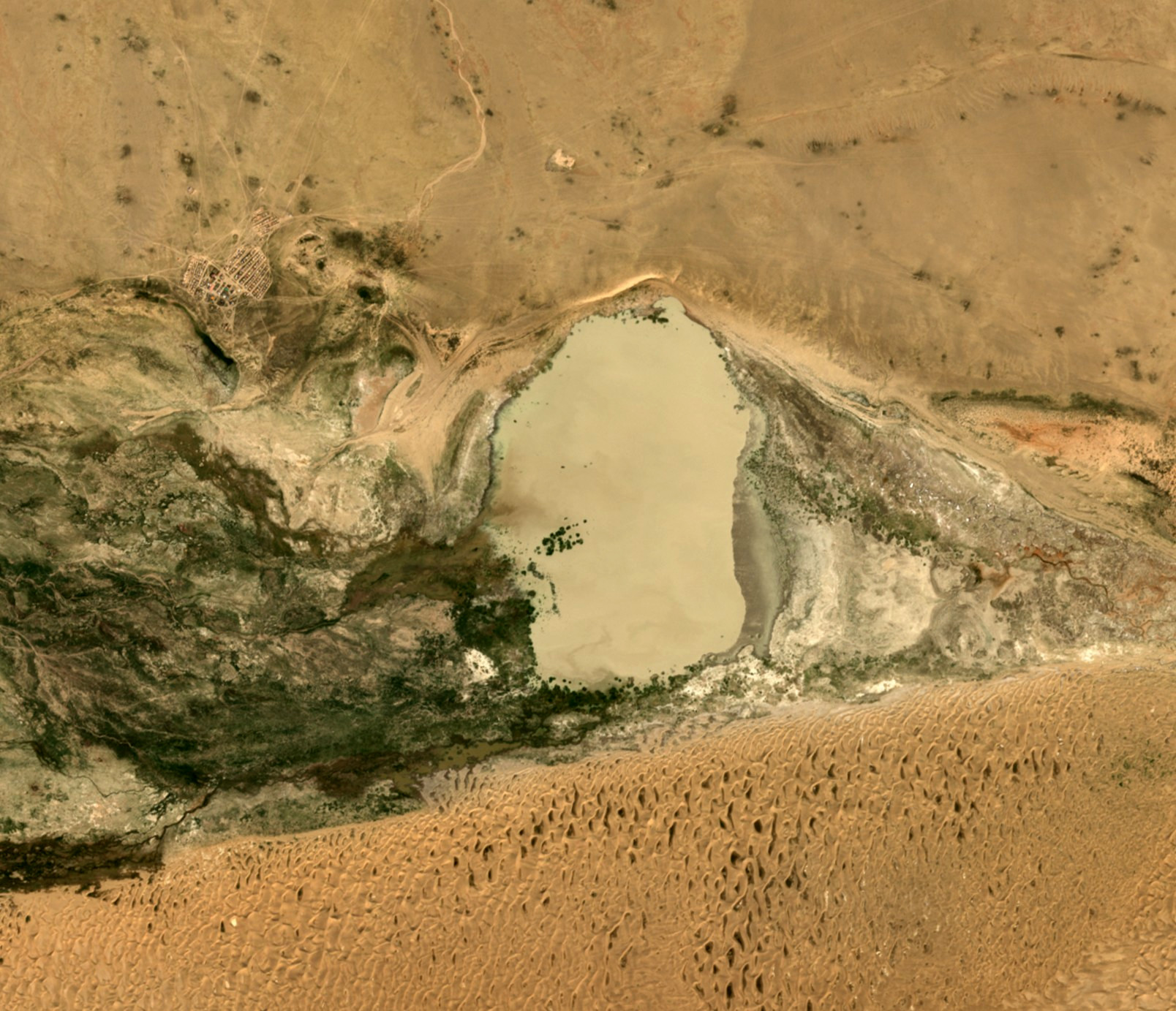
- Sentinel-2 image (2021)

- Location within Mongolia
- Location: Övörkhangai, Mongolia
- Coordinates: 45°09′31.8″N 101°28′14″E
- Basin countries: Mongolia
- Max. length: 24 km (15 mi)
- Max. width: 11 km (6.8 mi)
- Surface area: 252 km^{2} (97 sq mi)
- Average depth: 9.3 m (31 ft)
- Max. depth: 16 m (52 ft)
- Surface elevation: 1,312 m (4,304 ft)

Ramsar Wetland
- Official name: Taatsiin Tsagaan Nuur
- Designated: 6 July 1998
- Part of: Valley of the Lakes

Taatsiin Tsagaan Lake (Mongolian: Таацын Цагаан Нуур [Taatsiin Tsagaan Nuur] ᠲᠠᠭᠠᠴᠠ ᠤᠨ ᠴᠠᠭᠠᠨ ᠨᠠᠭᠤᠷ [taγača-un čaɣan naɣur]) is a large saline lake in Övörkhangai Province in the Gobi Desert of southern Mongolia.

Taatsiin Tsagaan Lake and the nearby Böön Tsagaan Lake, Adgiin Tsagaan Lake, and Orog Lake, are collectively designated a Ramsar wetland of international importance under the name "Valley of the Lakes". These lakes are known to be an important staging area for migratory waterfowl, and it has been suggested that they might be a breeding area for the rare Relict Gull. The lake has been designated an Important Bird Area by BirdLife International.

== See also ==
- Ramsar sites in Mongolia
- Böön Tsagaan Lake
