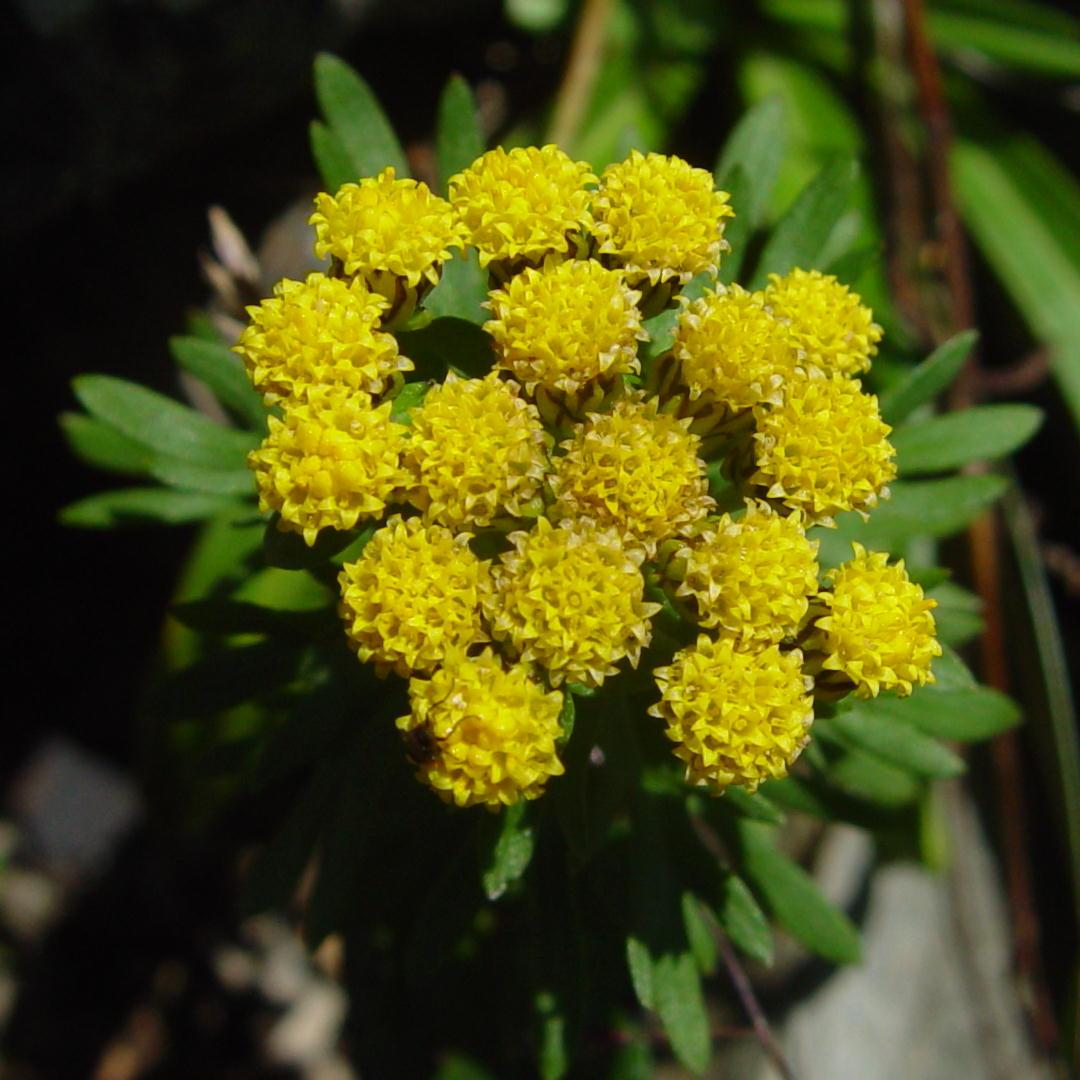

Scientific classification
- Kingdom: Plantae
- Clade: Tracheophytes
- Clade: Angiosperms
- Clade: Eudicots
- Clade: Asterids
- Order: Asterales
- Family: Asteraceae
- Genus: Ajania
- Species: A. rupestris

Binomial name
- Ajania rupestris (Matsum. & Koidz.) Muldashev

Synonyms
- Chrysanthemum rupestre (basionym); Dendranthema rupestre

= Ajania rupestris =

Species of plant

Ajania rupestris (イワインチン, iwa-inchin) is a species of flowering plant in the family Asteraceae that is endemic to Honshū, Japan.

== Taxonomy ==
First described in 1910 by Japanese botanists Jinzō Matsumura and Gen-ichi Koidzumi, as Chrysanthemum rupestre, in 1978 Siro Kitamura (北村四郎) transferred the taxon from Chrysanthemum to Dendranthema, as Dendranthema rupestre, then in 1983 Albert Akramovich Muldashev transferred it to the genus Ajania, the new combination being Ajania rupestris.

== Distribution ==
Ajania rupestris occurs from southern Tōhoku to the Chūbu region.
