= Chuluut River =

River in central Mongolia

Coordinates: 49°12′37″N 100°40′14″E

Chuluut River Chuluut gol
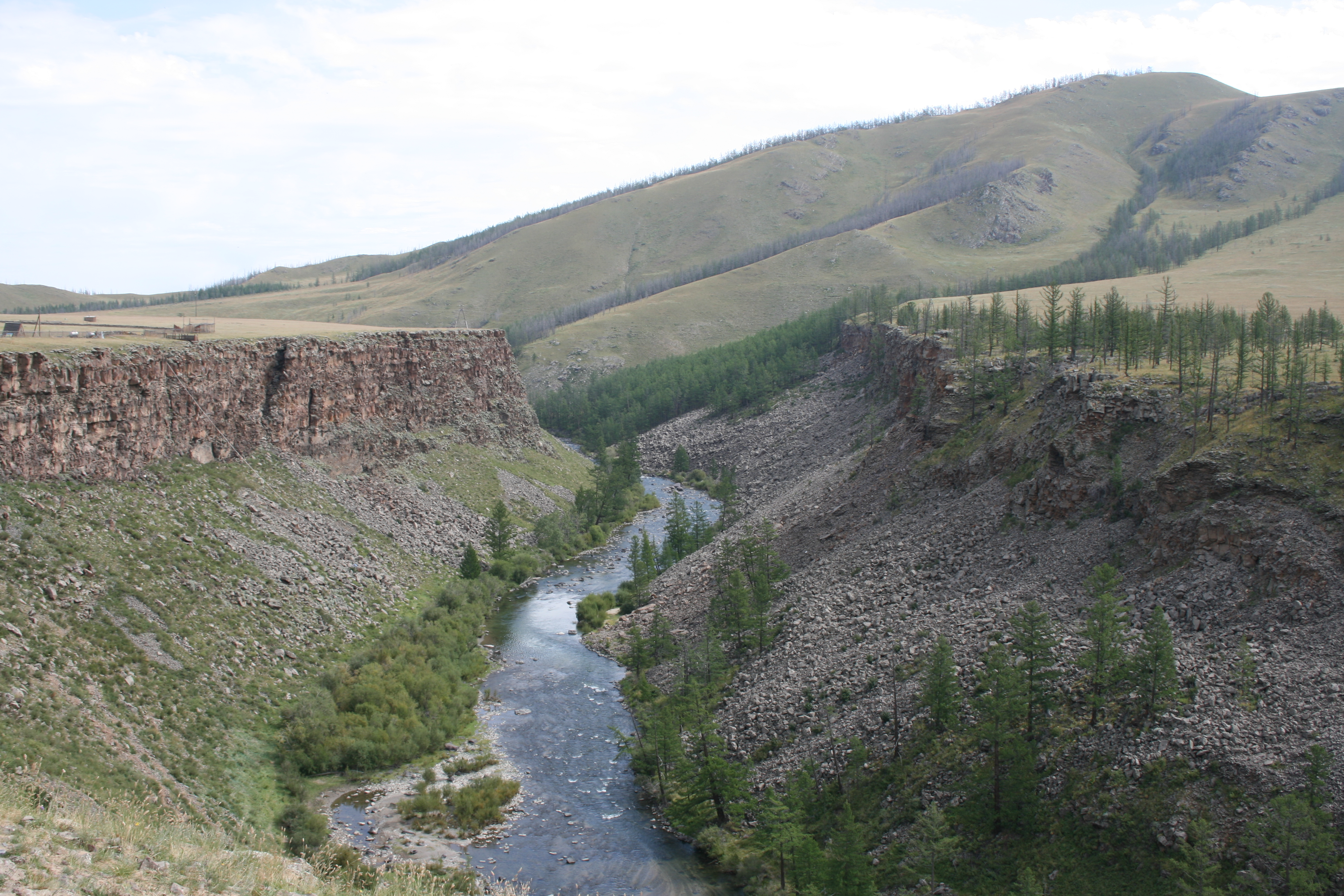
- the Chuluut Canyon, between Tariat and Öndör-Ulaan, Arkhangai
- Etymology: Mongolian: chuluut, "stony"
- Native name: Чулуут гол (Mongolian)

Location
- Country: Mongolia
- Aimags: Arkhangai, Khövsgöl

Physical characteristics
- Source
  - location: Khangai Mountains
- Mouth: Ider River
- Length: 415 km (258 mi)
- Basin size: 10,750 km^{2} (4,150 sq mi)

Basin features
- Progression: Ider→ Selenga→ Lake Baikal→ Angara→ Yenisey→ Kara Sea
- Tributaries
  - left: Suman River

Chuluut River (Mongolian: Чулуут гол; lit. 'Rocky River') is a river flowing through the Khangai Mountains in central Mongolia. It is a tributary of the Ider River; the width at the mouth into the Ider is 80 m, with a maximum depth of 3 m. It is 415 km long. It is usually frozen from November to April.

== Usage ==
In 2014, around 0.5 million m^{3} of water was withdrawn from the river for domestic, livestock, cropland and industrial use.
