= Khorgo =

Volcano in Arkhangai, Mongolia

- Mongolian: Хорго
- IUCN category II (national park)
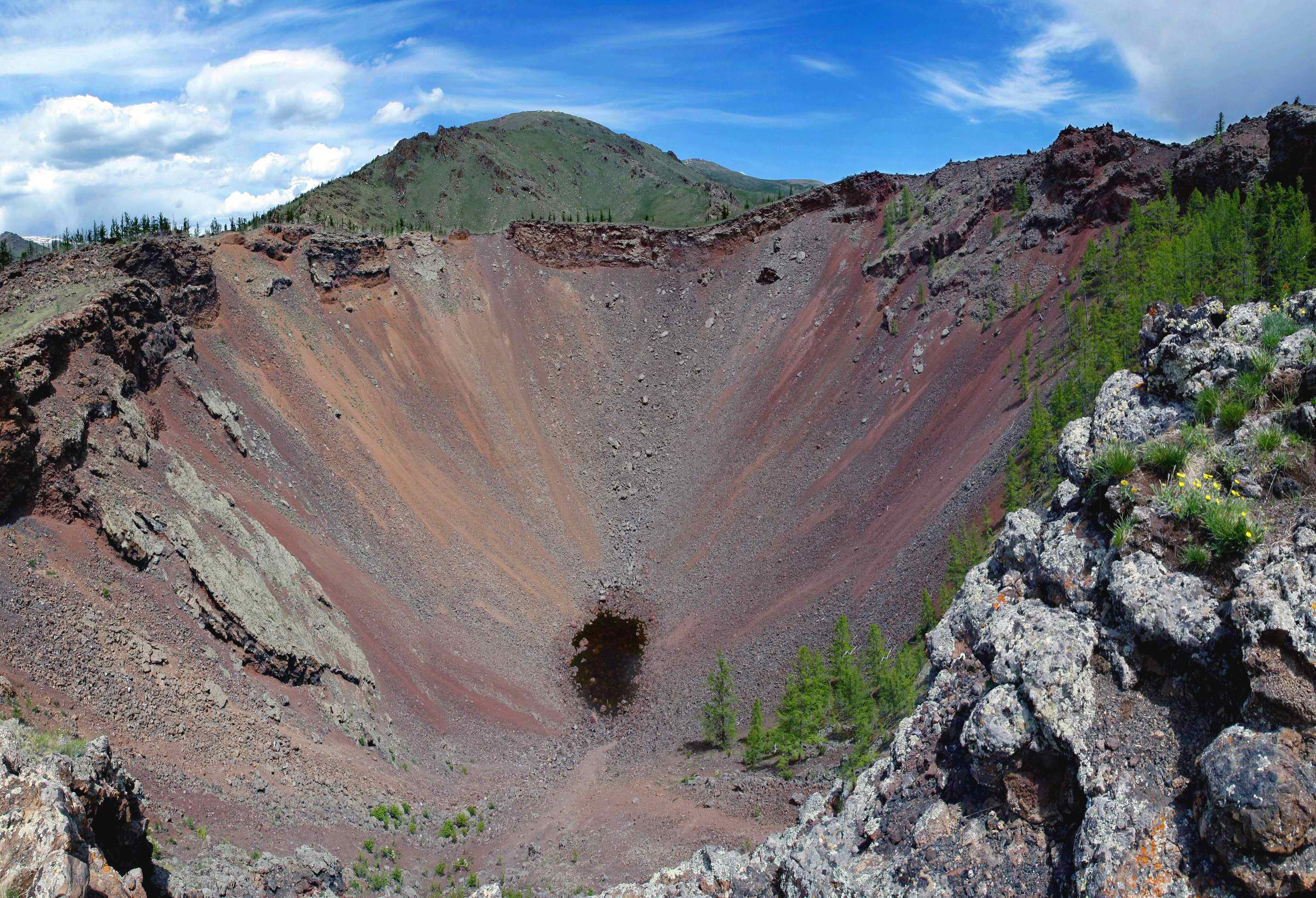
- View from the ridge of Khorgo

- Location within Mongolia
- Coordinates: 48.1847°N 99.8554°E
- Established: 1965
- Governing body: Ministry of Environment and Green Development of Mongolia

Khorgo (Mongolian: Хорго) is a dormant volcano in the Taryatu-Chulutu volcanic field in Tariat District, Arkhangai Province, Mongolia. Khorgo lies east of the Terkhiin Tsagaan lake and together they are the core of the Khorgo-Terkhiin Tsagaan Nuur National Park. The surrounding park has been a protected area since 1965 as a nature reserve, becoming fully protected in 1994/1997 (Note: Variously described as 1994 and 1997 on two different sources, please see nearest reference.) as a national park, in order to safeguard the scenery and the endangered flora and fauna of the area.

Khorgo is situated at an altitude of 2,210 m (7,250 ft), with a base diameter of 1,200 m (3,900 ft) and a height of 120 m (390 ft). On top of the cone there is a crater 180 m (590 ft) wide. A notable geological feature is the solidified lava bubbles, which the locals have named "basalt yurts". Around 8,000 years ago during the Holocene, the Khorgo cinder cone erupted, with lava flooding the valley below, forming a lava dam which created the Terkhiin Tsagaan lake.

The valleys surrounding the volcano are today populated by small forests of Siberian larch with a variety of flora and fauna. This includes wild goats, wild boars, various species of bird such as the ruddy shelduck and various species of deer such as red deer and Siberian deer.

There is no lake in the crater of Khorgo, but clouds of steam are sometimes emitted from crevices in the walls of the crater, forming ice in the winter. These ice forms are described as appearing from a distance to be "like large flocks of sheep scattered on the mountain".

== Gallery ==
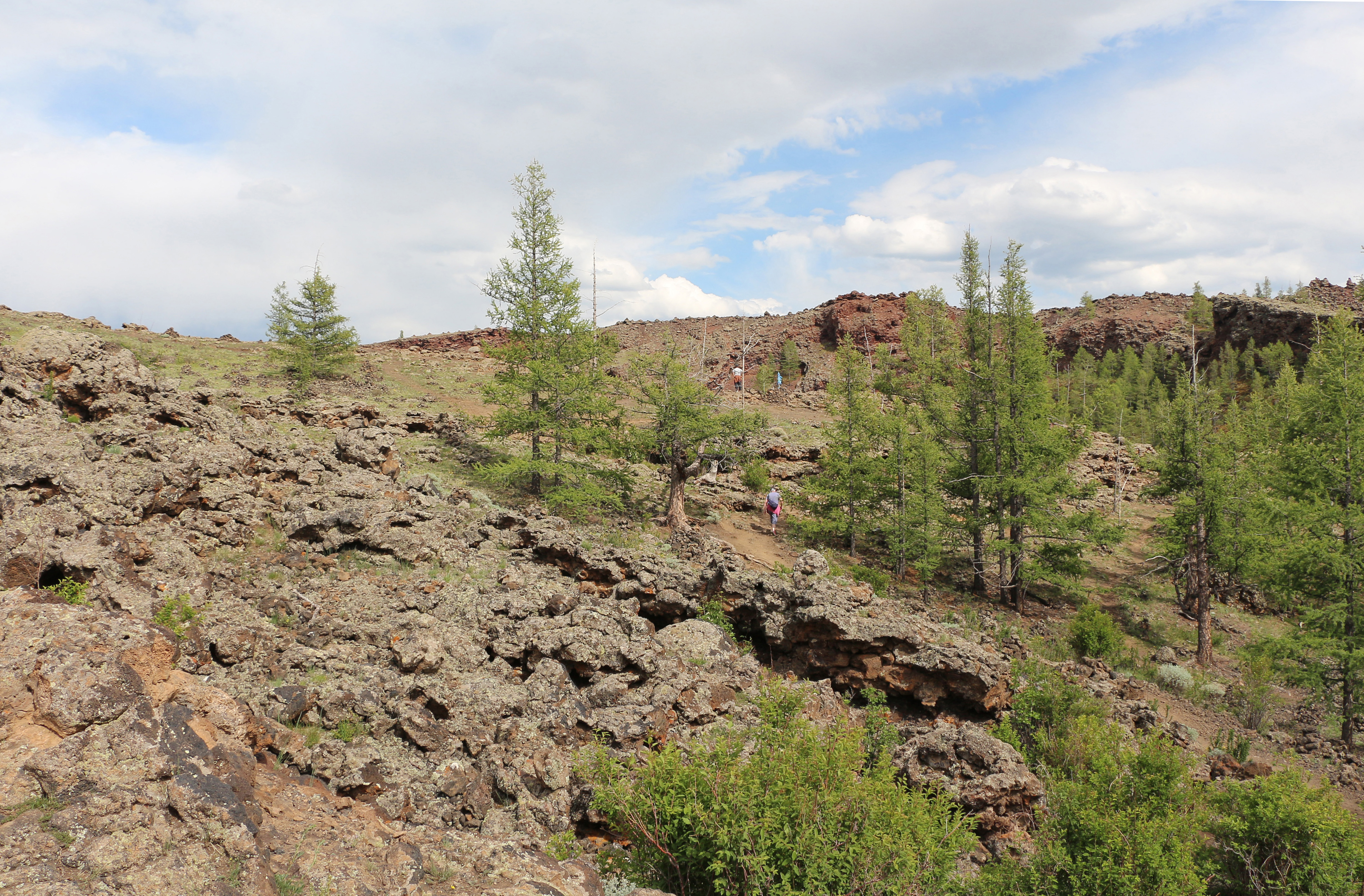
Exterior of the volcano

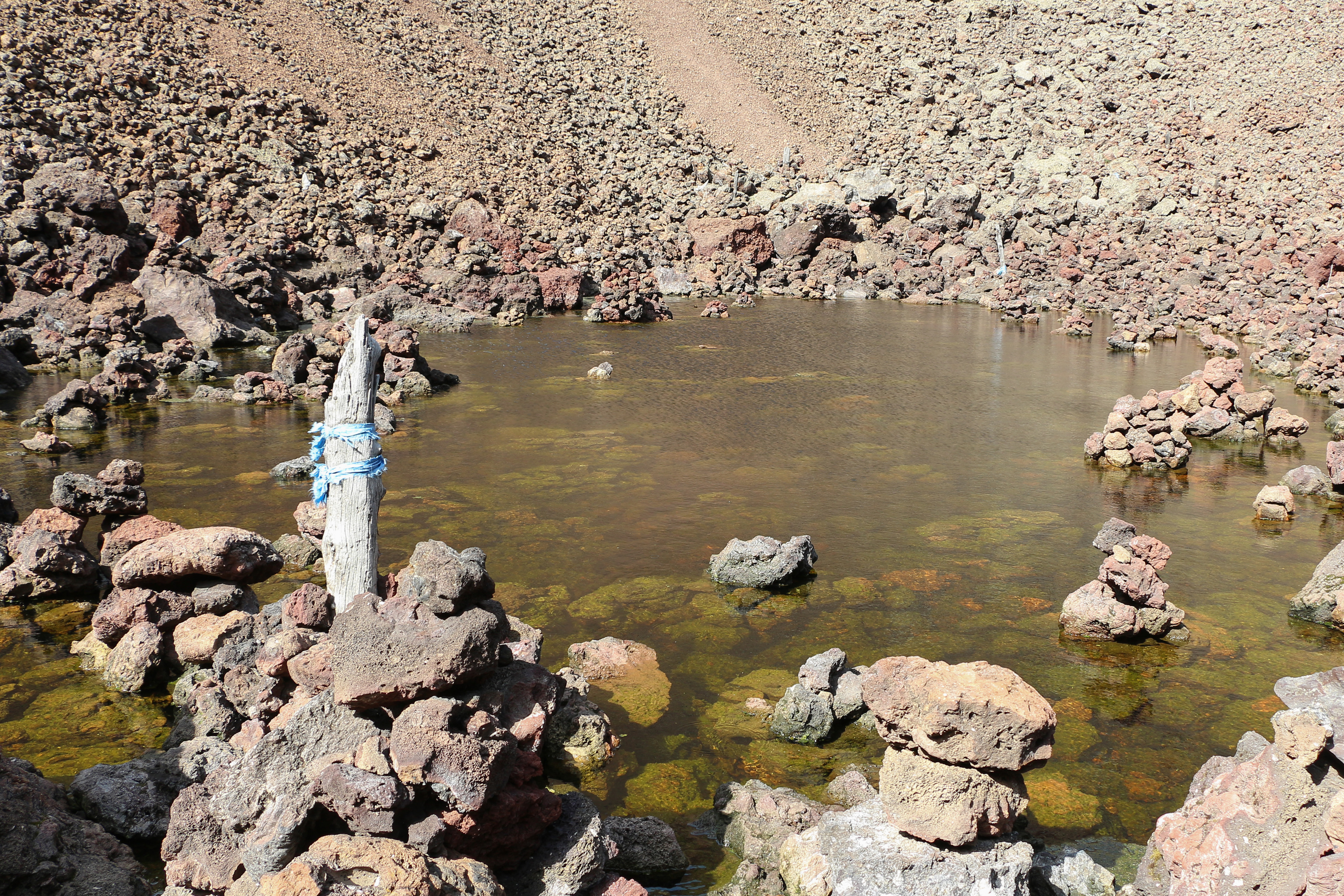
Inside the volcano

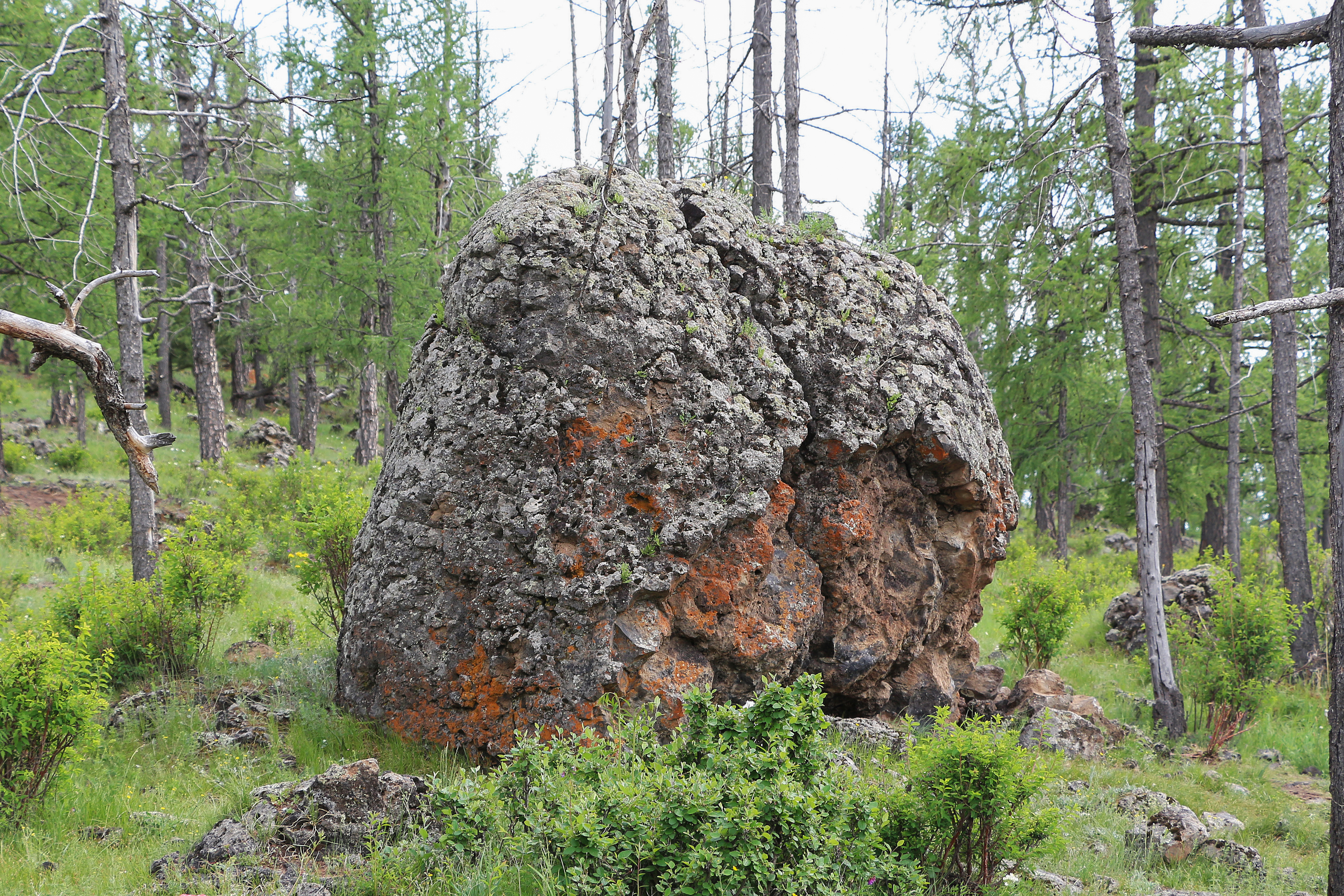
Volcanic rock from the volcano
