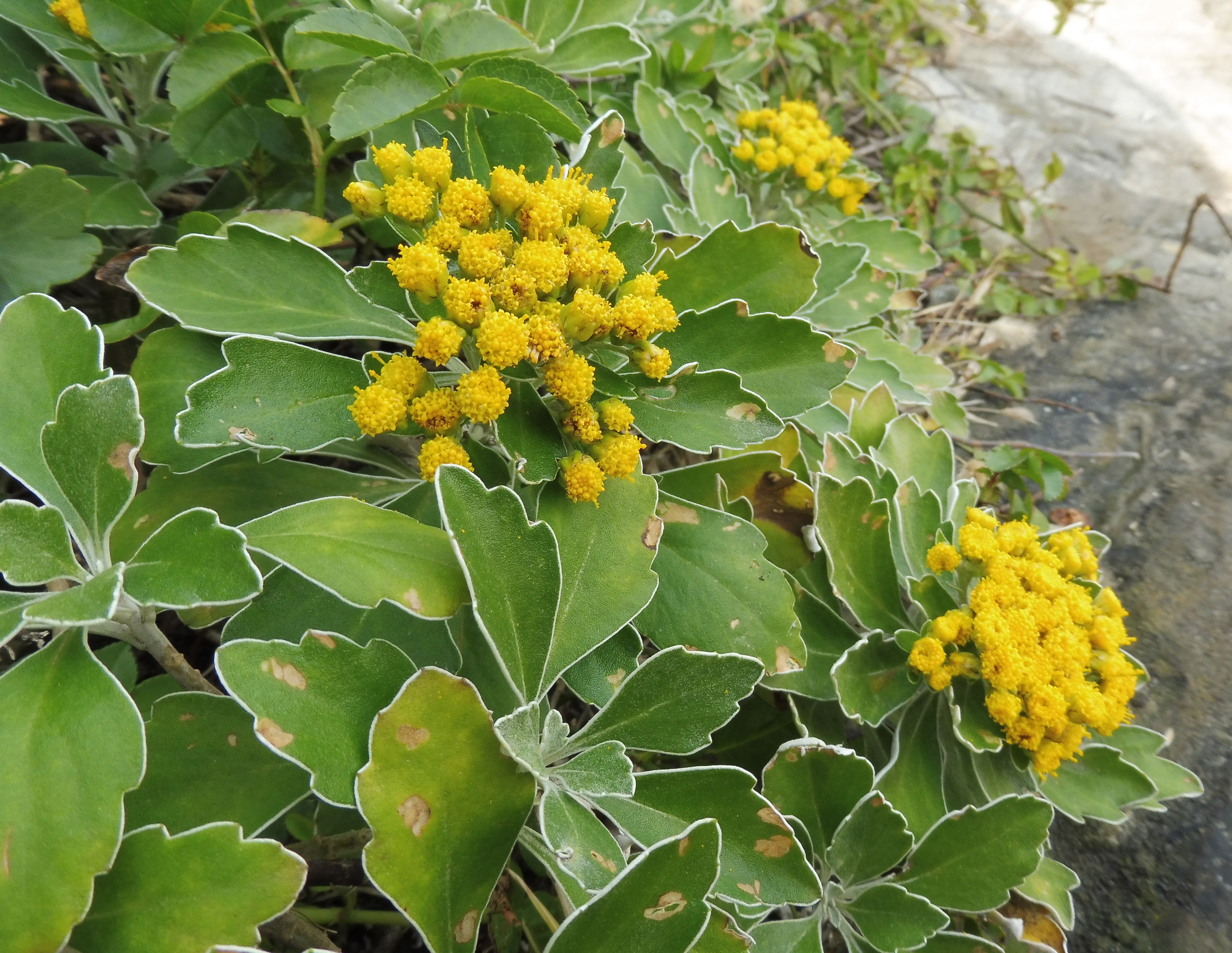
- Wild specimen on cliffs in Miura, Japan

Scientific classification
- Kingdom: Plantae
- Clade: Tracheophytes
- Clade: Angiosperms
- Clade: Eudicots
- Clade: Asterids
- Order: Asterales
- Family: Asteraceae
- Genus: Chrysanthemum
- Species: C. pacificum

Binomial name
- Chrysanthemum pacificum Nakai

Synonyms
- Ajania pacifica (Nakai) K. Bremer & Humphries; Dendranthema pacificum (Nakai) Kitam.

= Chrysanthemum pacificum =

Species of flowering plant

Chrysanthemum pacificum, commonly called gold and silver chrysanthemum, is a species of flowering plant in the aster family. It is native to Japan, where it is endemic to the island of Honshu. Its natural habitat is along the Pacific coast, where it often grows on ocean cliffs.

== Description ==
It is a showy plant, blooming in late fall and producing yellow heads of flowers. It was introduced into U.S. gardening catalogs in 1989, and has been in cultivation in Japan since an early date.

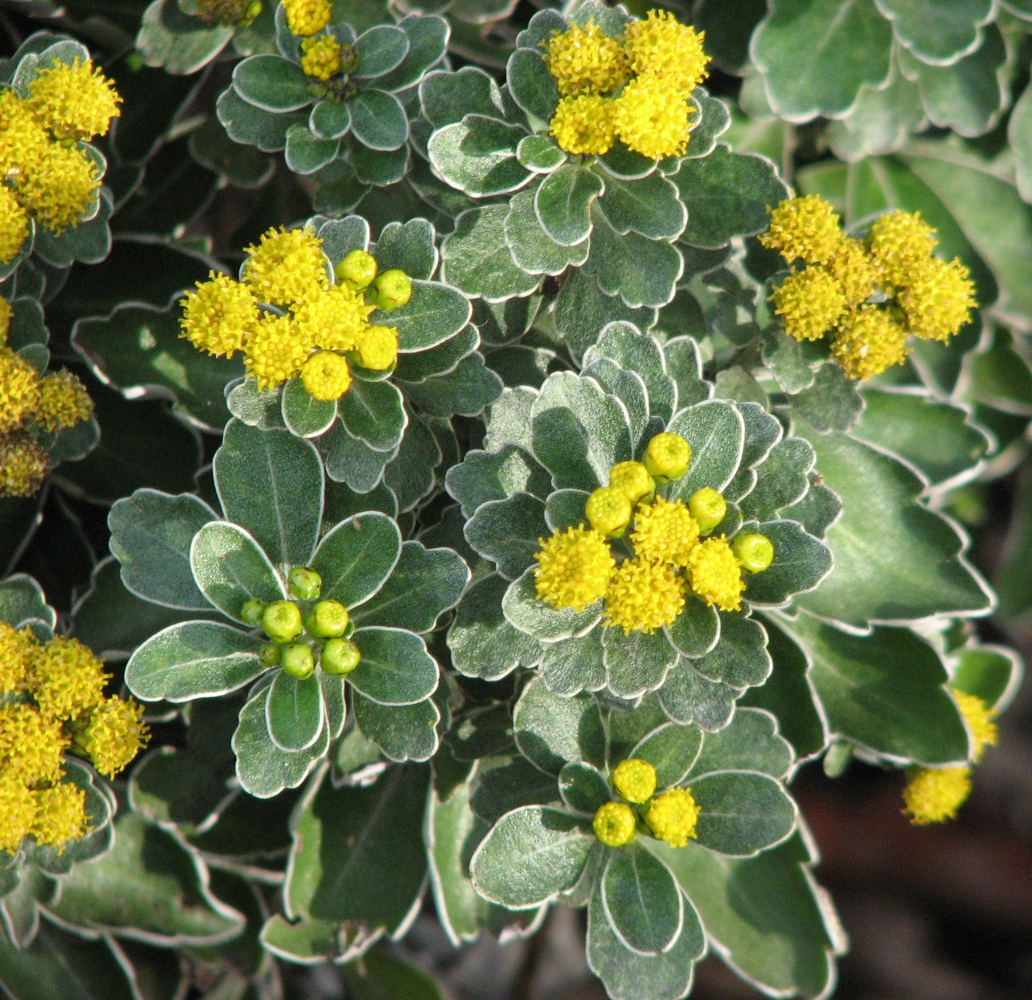
Overhead view of flowers in cultivation
