= Limburgite =

Type of volcanic rock

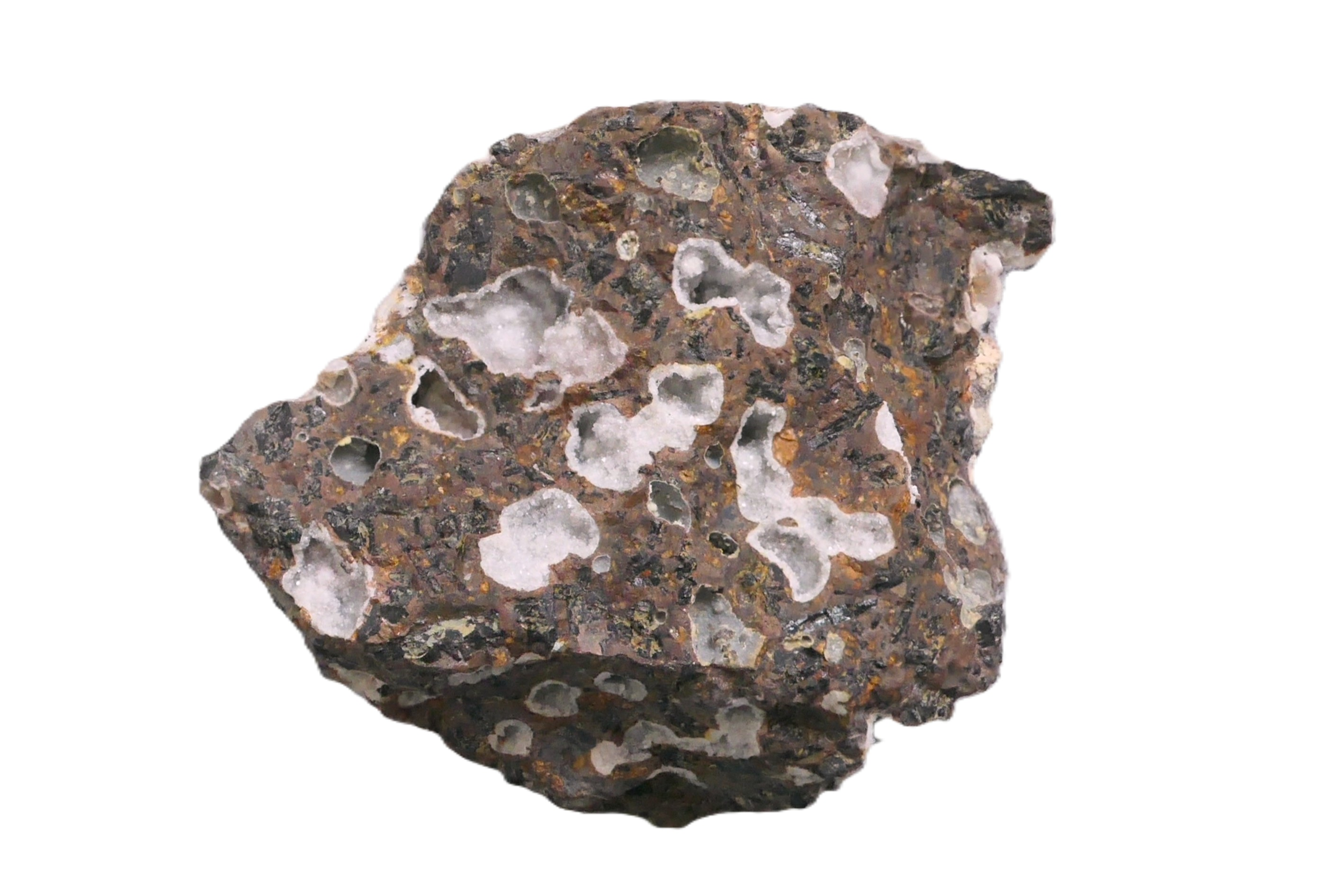
Limburgite from Limburg quarry, Germany (type locality)

In petrology, limburgite is a dark-colored volcanic rock resembling basalt in appearance, but containing normally no feldspar. The name derives from the type locality the Limberg or the Limburg, close to Sasbach am Kaiserstuhl in Baden-Württemberg, where they occur in the well-known rock of the Kaiserstuhl.

They consist essentially of olivine and augite with a brownish glassy groundmass. The augite may be green, but more commonly is brown or violet; the olivine is usually pale green or colourless, but is sometimes yellow. Within the groundmass a second generation of small euhedral augites frequently occurs; more rarely olivine is present also as an ingredient of the matrix. The principal accessory minerals are ilmenite and apatite. Feldspar, though sometimes present, is never abundant, and nepheline also is unusual. In some limburgites large phenocrysts of dark brown hornblende and biotite are found, mostly with irregular borders blackened by resorption; in others there are large crystals of anorthoclase. Hauyne is an ingredient of some of the limburgites of the Cape Verde Islands.

Rocks of this group occur in considerable numbers in Germany (Rhine district) and in Bohemia, also in Scotland, Auvergne, Spain, Africa (Kilimanjaro) and Brazil. They are associated principally with basalts, nepheline and leucite basalts and monchiquites. From the last-named rocks the limburgites are not easily separated as the two classes bear a very close resemblance in structure and in mineral composition, though many authorities believe that the ground mass of the monchiquites is not a glass but crystalline analcite. Limburgites may occur as flows, as sills or dykes, and are sometimes highly vesicular. Closely allied to them are the augitites, which are distinguished only by the absence of olivine; examples are known from Bohemia, Auvergne, the Canary Islands and Ireland.

== See also ==
- Basanite
