= Tariat =

District in Arkhangai Province, Mongolia

Coordinates: 48°09′29″N 99°53′24″E

Tariat District Тариат сум (Mongolian) ᠲᠠᠷᠢᠶ᠋ᠠᠲᠤᠰᠤᠮᠤ
- District
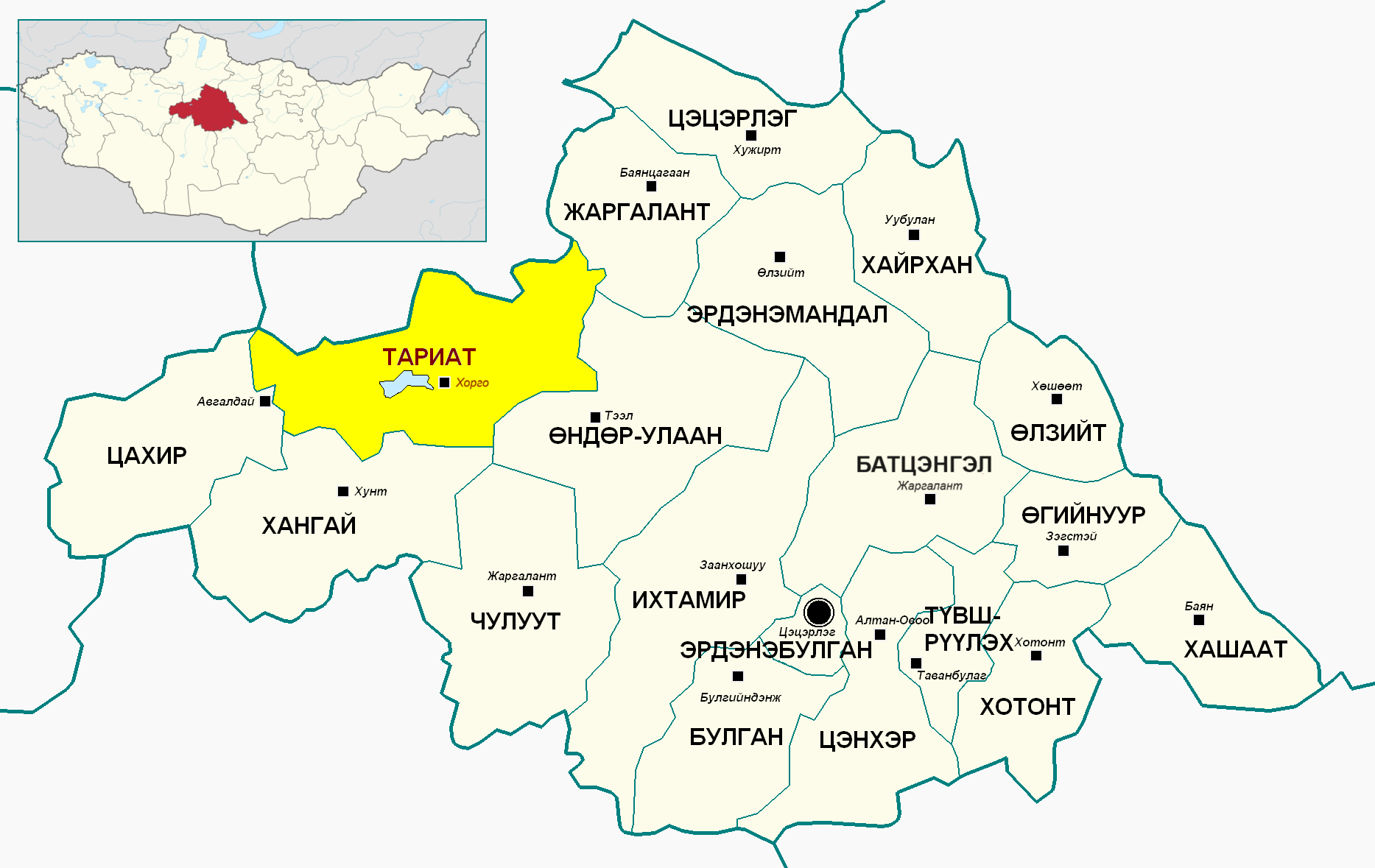
- Tariat District in Arkhangai Province
- Country: Mongolia
- Province: Arkhangai Province

Area
  - Total: 3,800 km^{2} (1,500 sq mi)
- Time zone: UTC+8 (UTC + 8)

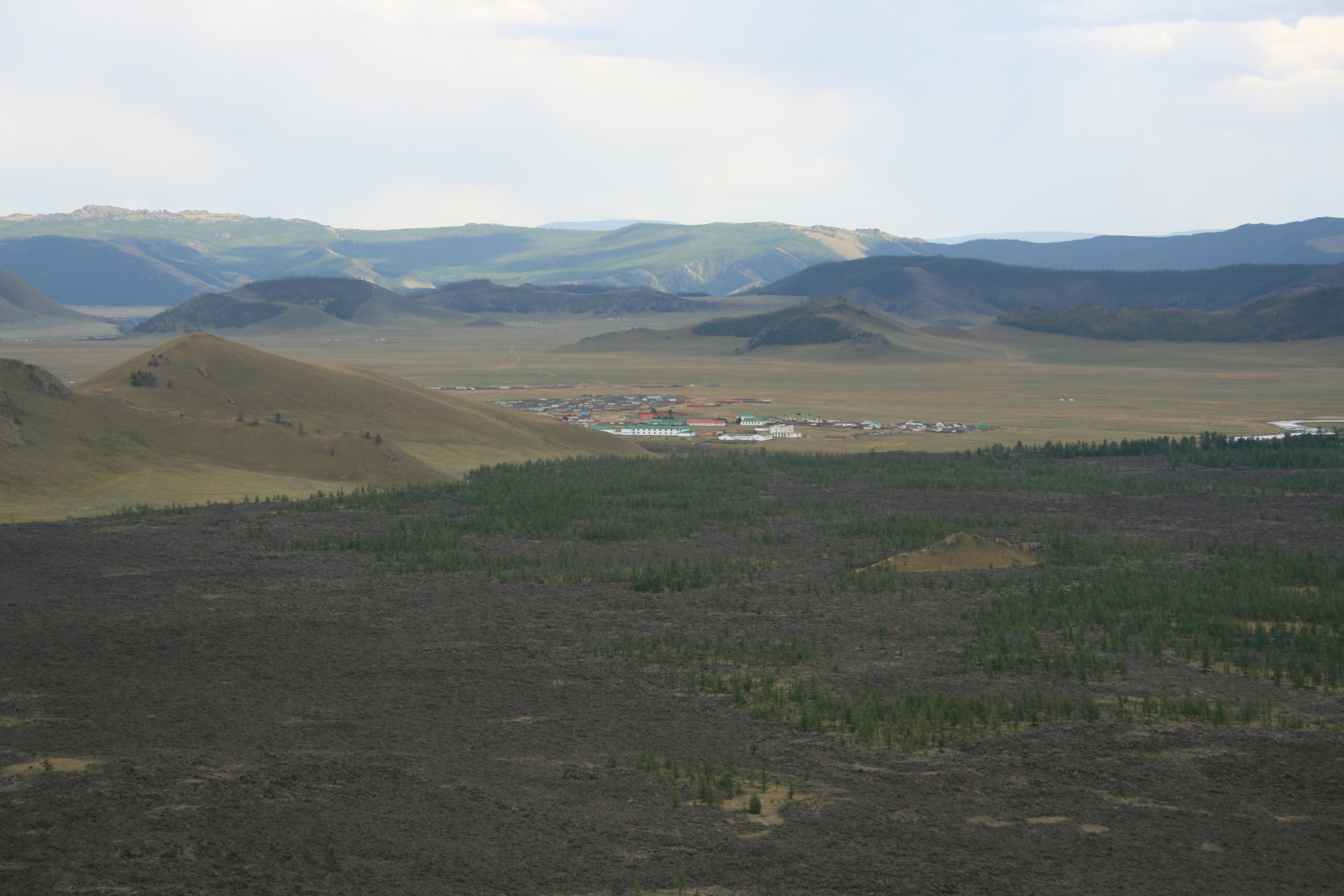
Tariat sum center and lava fields from the Khorgo volcano

Tariat (/ˈtæriət/; Mongolian: Тариат [tʰɛ́rʲɛtʰ]) is a district of Arkhangai Province in central Mongolia. As of 2009 it had a population of 5,086 (mainly Chalcha), 644 of whom lived in the village of Tariat.

== Geography ==
Tariat is located 195 kilometres (121 mi) northwest of Tsetserleg, the capital of the province. To west of the town is Khorgo-Terkhiin Tsagaan Nuur National Park, noted for its striking crater Khorgo.

The Chuluut River flows through the district. In 1977 the Soviet geologist Kavel discovered rock images along the river.

== Administrative divisions ==
The district is divided into seven bags, which are:

- Altaid
- Buuruljuut
- Khorgo
- Murun
- Suman
- Terkh
- Tsagaannuur

== Education ==
The school in Tariat was attended by the Mongolian Social Democratic Party politician Radnaasümbereliin Gonchigdorj.
