= Suman River =

River in Mongolia

Suman Gol Suman River
- Native name: Суман гол (Mongolian)

Location
- Country: Mongolia
- Aimags: Arkhangai

Physical characteristics
- Source: Terkhiin Tsagaan Nuur
  - coordinates: 48°9′30″N 99°52′50″E
- Mouth: Chuluut River
  - coordinates: 48°14′N 100°26′E
- Length: 50 km (31 mi)

Basin features
- Progression: Chuluut→ Ider→ Selenga→ Lake Baikal→ Angara→ Yenisey→ Kara Sea

The Suman River (Mongolian: Суман гол) is a river in Arkhangai, Mongolia. It flows from the Terkhiin Tsagaan Nuur and is a tributary of the Chuluut River. The length is about 50 km.
