= Khangai Mountains =

Mountain range in Mongolia

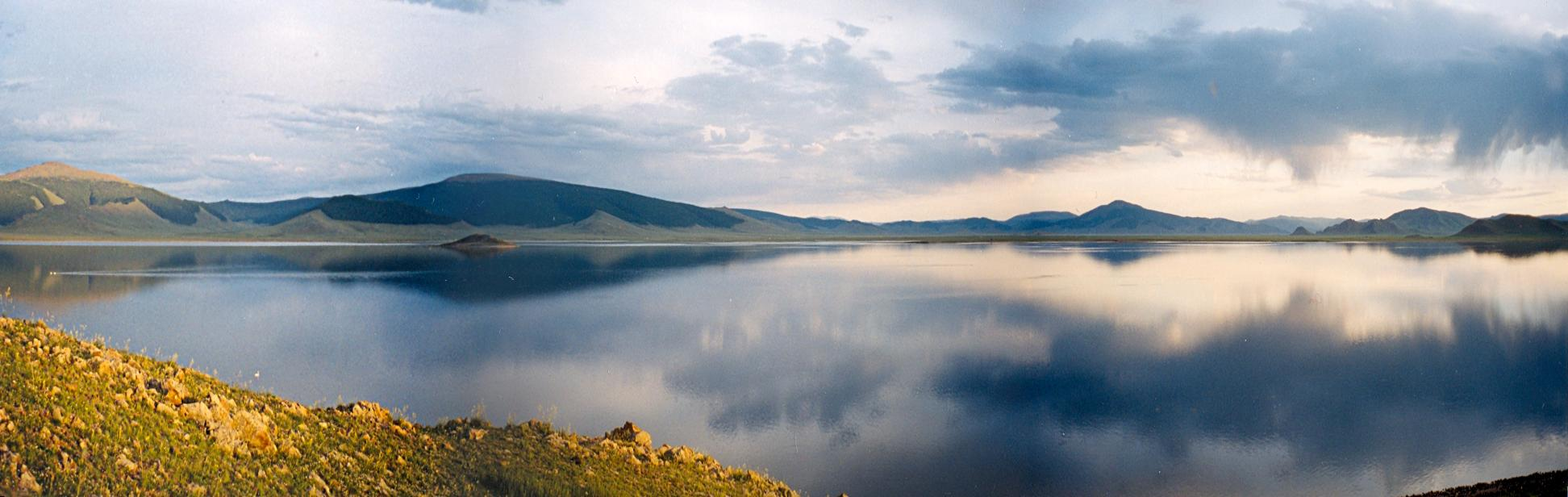
- Panorama of Lake Terkhiin Tsagaan in the Khangai Mountains

Highest point
- Peak: Otgontenger
- Elevation: 4,031 m (13,225 ft)

Naming
- Native name: Mongolian: Хангайн нуруу

Geography
- Location within Mongolia
- Country: Mongolia
- Aimags: Arkhangai, Övörkhangai, Bayankhongor and Zavkhan
- Rivers: Ider River and Orkhon River
- Settlements: Tsetserleg, Bayankhongor and Uliastai
- Range coordinates: 47°30′N 100°0′E

The Khangai Mountains (Note: Mongolian: Хангайн нуруу, romanized: Khangain nuruu, pronounced [χaɴɢɛ́ɴ nʊrʊ́]) form a range in central Mongolia, some 400 km (250 mi) west of Ulaanbaatar.

== Name ==
Two provinces of Mongolia are named after the Khangai mountains: Arkhangai (North Khangai) and Ovorkhangai (South Khangai). The mild climate area where the two provinces meet (in eastern Khangai) is known as the cradle of Mongolian and nomadic civilization. The plains at the foot of the eastern Khangai host the Orkhon Valley World Heritage Site. The Xiongnu capital Luut Khot (Lungcheng), the Xianbei capital Ordo and the Rouran capital Moomt (Mume) are said to have been located there. Later empires also established their capitals there: e.g. the Uyghur Khaganate (745–840) built their capital Ordu-Baliq in the region.

== Features ==
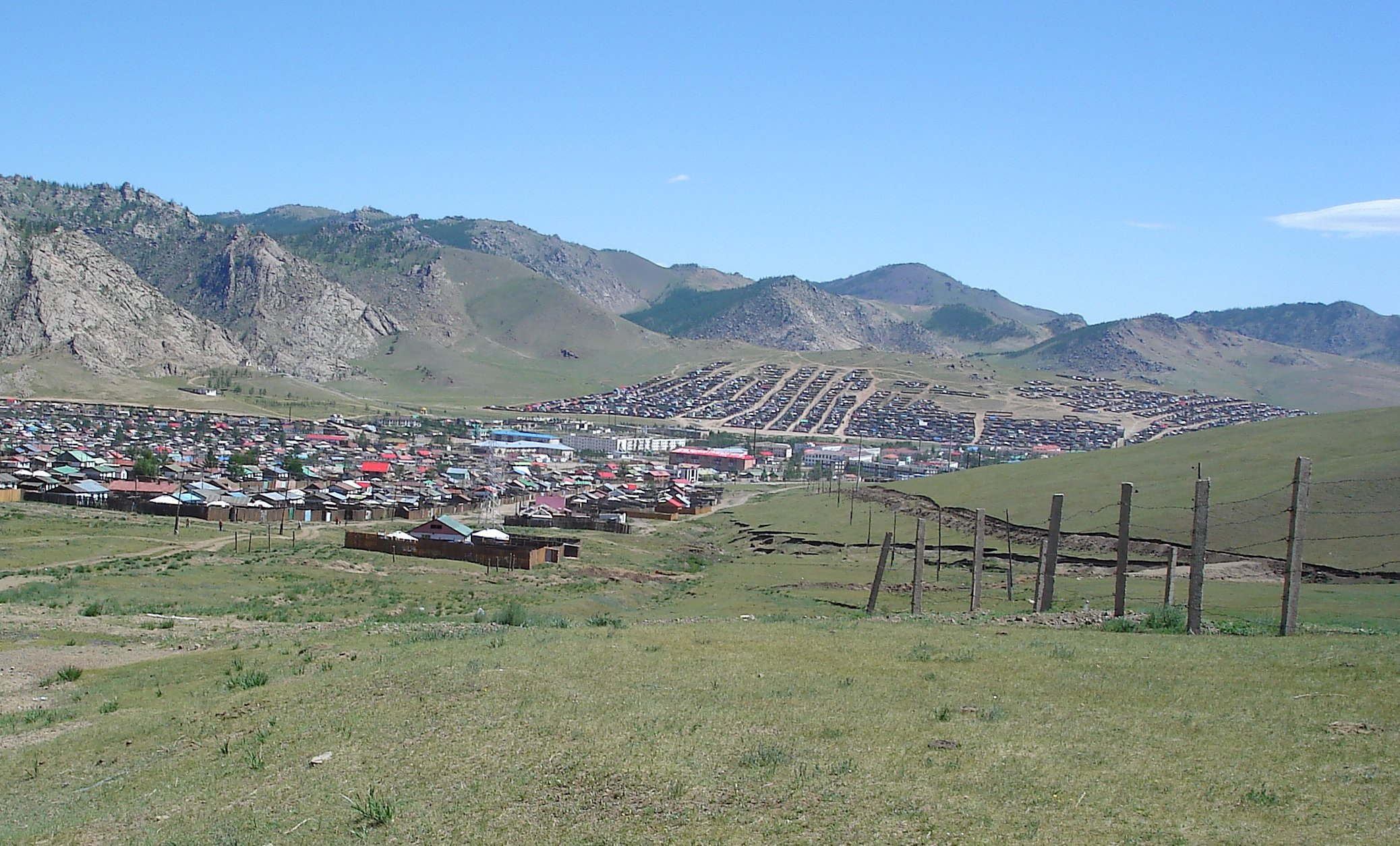
The Khangai Mountains at Tsetserleg, capital of Arkhangai Province.

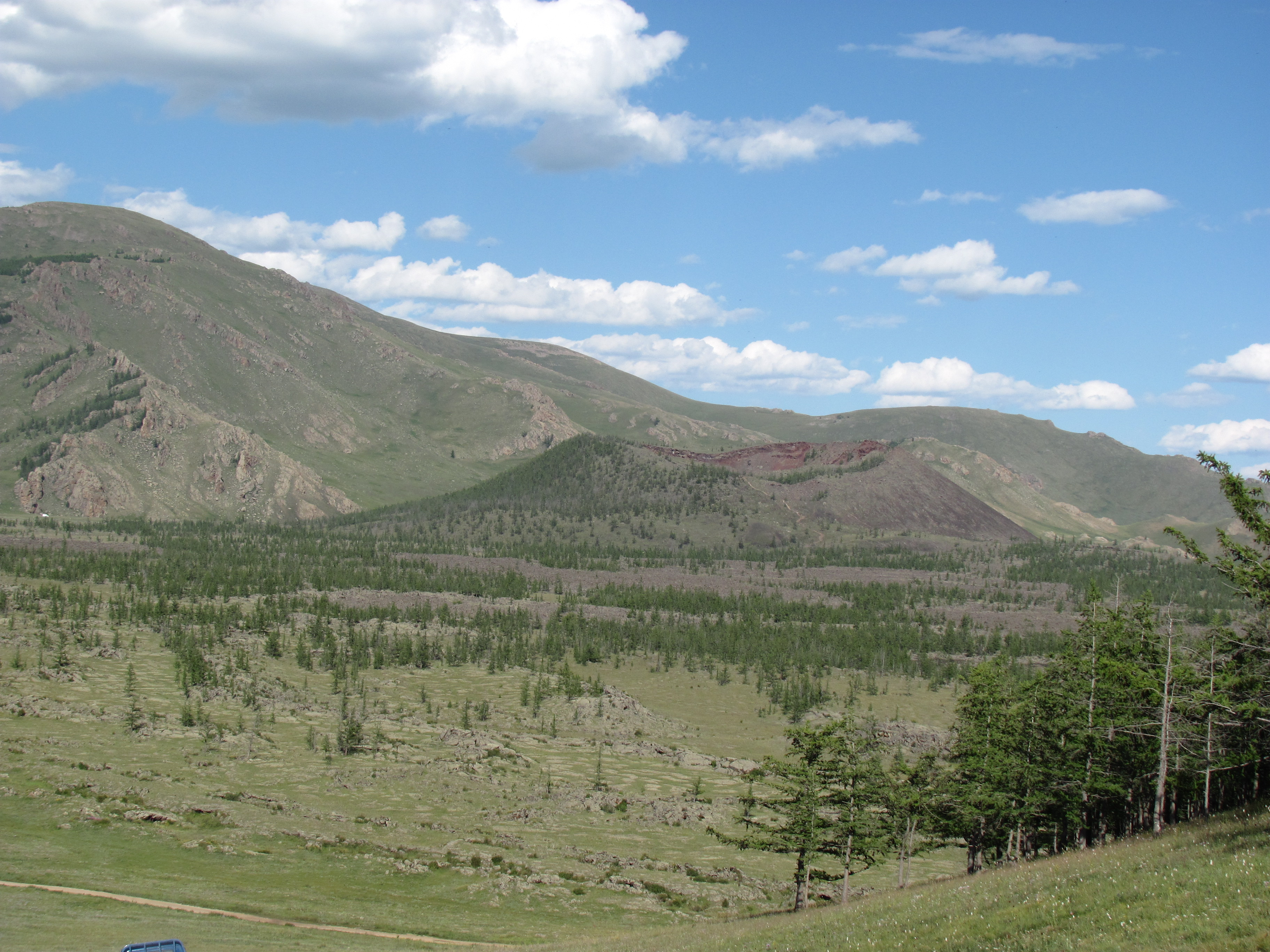
Khorgo extinct volcano in the northern Khangai Mountains

The tallest mountain is Otgontenger (lit. "Youngest sky"), which is about 4,000 metres high. It is revered by the Mongols and state ceremonies are held there. Otgontenger is considered sacred by ancient Turks.

Suvraga Khairkhan, 3,117 metres tall, is another sacred mountain to the east of Tsetserleg.

Taryatu-Chulutu is an extinct volcanic field on the northern slopes of the Khangai Mountains.

The mountains feed the rivers Orkhon, Selenge, Ider, Zavkhan and the lakes Orog and Böön Tsagaan. In the west, the Khangai mountains transition into the Great Lakes Depression.

The Khangai mountain region is known for its mild microclimates in certain areas. Winters there are not as harsh as in other parts of the country.

Because of strong winter inversions which have become known as a singularity of the mesoclimate of Mongolia (Gavrilova 1974) the Khangai tends to be some 10°C warmer than the surrounding areas. It is likely that even the highest mountain tops are some 5°C warmer than the sub-Khangai basins.

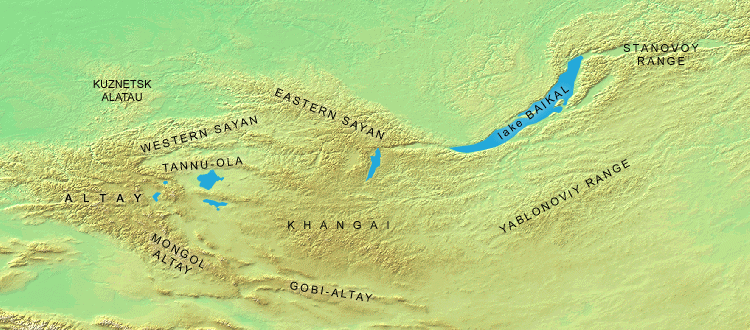
Location of the Khangai Mountains in Central Asia
