= Böön Tsagaan Lake =

Lake Boon Tsagaan
- Бөөн Цагаан нуур (Mongolian)
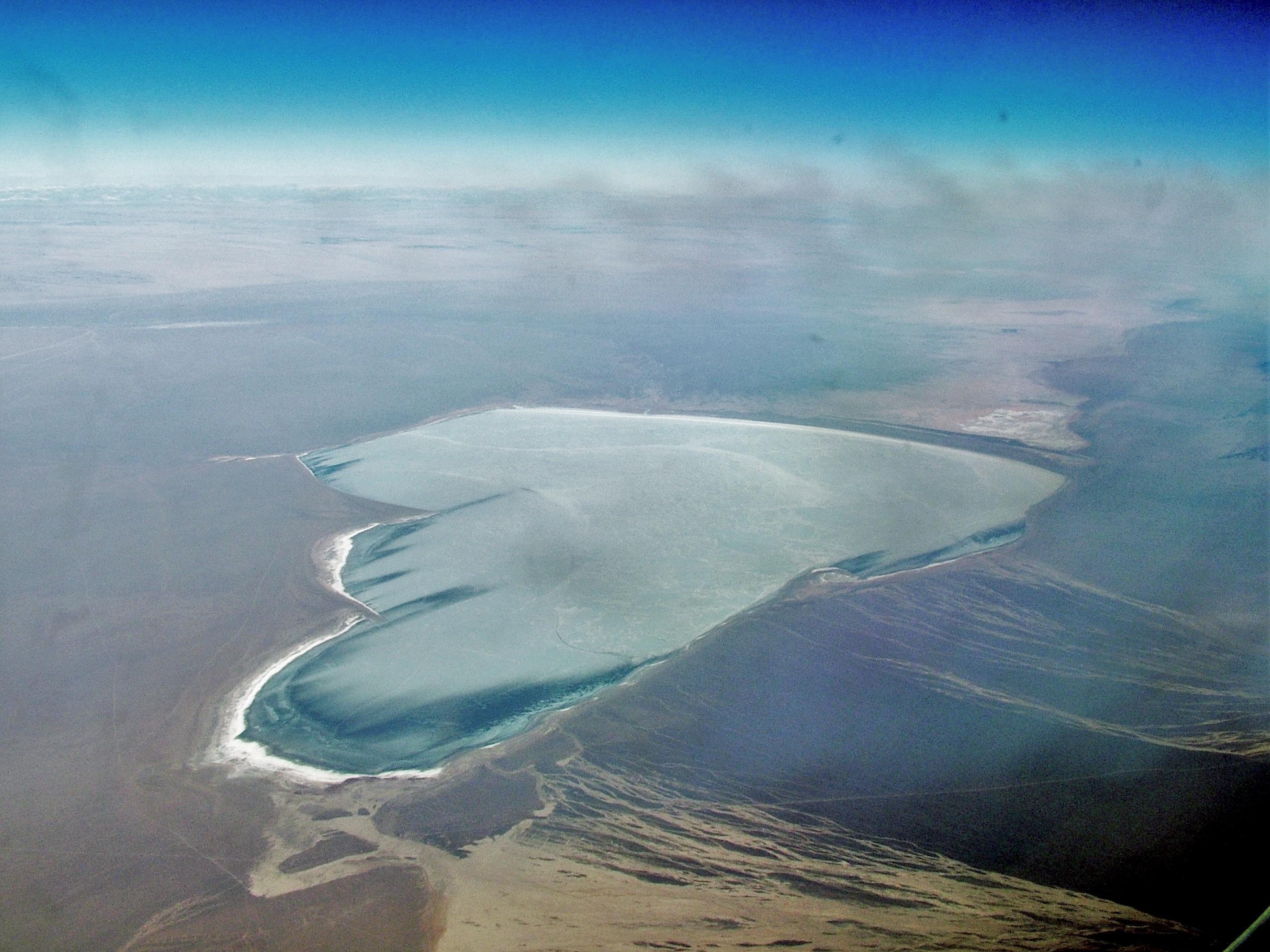
- Aerial photo of Lake Boon Tsagaan
- Interactive map of Lake Boon Tsagaan
- Location: Govi (Gobi) region, southern Mongolia
- Type: Endorheic lake
- Primary inflows: Baidrag River
- Primary outflows: None
- Basin countries: Mongolia
- Max. length: 23.5–24 km (14.6–14.9 mi)
- Max. width: 19 km (12 mi)
- Surface area: ~240–252 km^{2} (93–97 sq mi)
- Average depth: 9.9 m (32 ft) (average)
- Max. depth: ~16 m (52 ft)
- Water volume: ~0.64 km^{3} (0.15 cu mi)
- Surface elevation: 1,312–1,336 m (4,304–4,383 ft)

Lake Boon Tsagaan (also spelled Lake Buun Tsagaan; Mongolian: Бөөн Цагаан нуур) is a large endorheic lake located in southern Mongolia in the Bayankhongor province. It is the largest lake in the Govi (Gobi) region and one of the principal surface water bodies in the Valley of Lakes. The lake plays an important role in the hydrological system of the Central Asian internal drainage basin through its connection with the Baidrag River.

== Geography ==
Lake Boon Tsagaan lies in the central Valley of Lakes between the Khangai Mountains to the north and the Govi Altai Mountains to the south. The reported elevation of the lake ranges from approximately 1312 to 1336 m above sea level. The lake has a maximum length of about 23.5–24 km, a maximum width of up to 19 km, and a shoreline length of approximately 81 km.

The surrounding landscape consists of plains, sand dune fields, and mountain ranges. Numerous paleoshorelines and terraces preserved along the northern, eastern, and southeastern shores indicate higher lake levels during the late Quaternary period.

== Hydrology ==
Lake Boon Tsagaan is a closed-basin lake with no surface outflow. Its main inflow is the Baidrag River, which drains the southern slopes of the Khangai Mountains. Additional water sources include seasonal streams from the Govi Altai Mountains, direct precipitation, groundwater inflow, and meltwater from permafrost and small glaciers in the Khangai region.

The lake typically reaches its highest water level during July and August, coinciding with peak summer precipitation. Annual evaporation is high, averaging approximately 920–930 mm, and has increased in recent decades. The lake freezes between November or December and April, with ice thickness generally less than 1.2 m.

== Physical characteristics ==
The surface area of Lake Boon Tsagaan has varied considerably over time, with modern estimates generally ranging between 240 and 252 km². The average depth is approximately 9.9 m, while maximum depths reach about 16 m in the central basin. The total water volume is estimated at around 0.64 km³.

The lake water is mineralized, with calcium, sodium, and potassium as the dominant cations. Hydrochemical studies have documented increasing ion concentrations in recent decades, which are partly attributed to climate warming and permafrost thawing in the catchment area.

== Climate ==
The lake basin experiences a cold, arid continental climate typical of the Govi region. Instrumental records from nearby meteorological stations indicate a mean annual air temperature of approximately 3.4 °C and an average annual precipitation of about 86 mm. Since the late 20th century, air temperatures have shown a clear increasing trend, while precipitation has exhibited strong interannual variability.

== Changes in area ==
Remote sensing and historical data show that Lake Boon Tsagaan has undergone significant fluctuations in surface area over recent decades. Between 1970 and 2014, the lake lost approximately 83 km² of surface area, representing a reduction of about 25–26%. Statistical analyses indicate a strong negative correlation between lake area and rising air temperatures, and a weaker relationship with precipitation variability.

These changes are consistent with trends observed in other lakes of the Valley of Lakes and are generally attributed to regional climate warming and increasing aridity since the 1990s.

== Geological and paleoenvironmental significance ==
Lake Boon Tsagaan occupies a tectonic basin filled with Neogene and Quaternary sediments. Geological, geomorphological, and geochemical records from the lake provide important evidence for reconstructing paleoclimate and hydrological changes in southern Mongolia. During the late Quaternary period, the lake was likely connected to a larger lake system extending eastward toward Lake Adgiin Tsagaan.

== Scientific importance ==
Lake Boon Tsagaan is widely studied as a natural archive for climate change, permafrost dynamics, and lacustrine basin evolution in arid Central Asia. Its sedimentary, geochemical, and shoreline records contribute to reconstructions of environmental conditions over glacial, Holocene, and historical timescales.
