= Tamir River =

River in Arkhangai, Mongolia

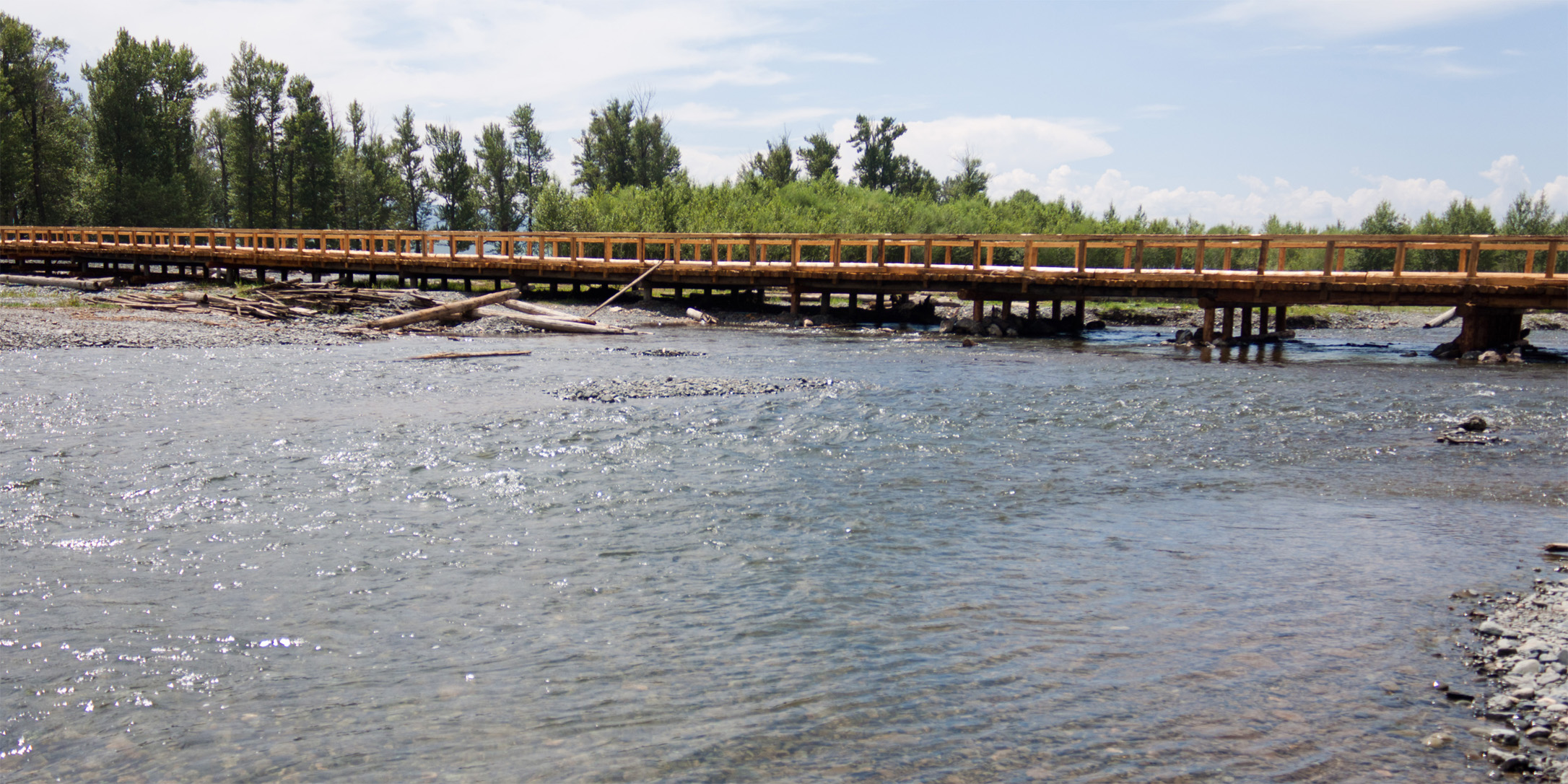
- Tamir River near Tsetserleg, Arkhangai
- Etymology: Mongolian: tamir = strength, vigor
- Native name: Тамир гол (Mongolian)

Location
- Country: Mongolia
- Aimag: Arkhangai
- Major City: Tsetserleg

Physical characteristics
- Source: Northern Tamir
  - location: Ikh-Tamir
  - coordinates: 47°5′55″N 100°36′20″E
- 2nd source: Southern Tamir
  - location: Bulgan
  - coordinates: 46°55′40″N 100°49′35″E
- Source confluence
  - location: Battsengel
  - coordinates: 47°46′10″N 102°1′0″E
- Mouth: Orkhon River
  - location: Ögii Lake, Ögiinuur
  - coordinates: 47°47′30″N 102°36′40″E

Basin features
- Progression: Orkhon→ Selenga→ Lake Baikal→ Angara→ Yenisey→ Kara Sea

The Tamir River (Mongolian: Тамир гол [tʰɛ́mɪr ɢ̊ɔɬ]) is a river flowing through the valleys of the Khangai Mountains in Arkhangai Province, Mongolia. The river is the namesake of the Mongolian literature classic by Chadraabaliin Lodoidamba, The Clear Tamir River (Тунгалаг тамир, Tungalag tamir).

For most of its length, the Tamir is divided into two branches: the Northern Tamir (Хойд Тамир, Khoid Tamir) and the Southern Tamir (Урд Тамир, Urd Tamir).

The Northern Tamir starts between the Shalkhagiin Khoit mountain range and the Togoo Mountain in the Ikh-Tamir. The southern Tamir starts about 25 km to the south-west in the Bulgan at the end of the Khairkhnii mountain range. The two branches run a roughly north-eastern course up to their confluence at the district center of Battsengel.

The Tamir is a main tributary of the Orkhon River, which it meets in Ögii Nuur, opposite to the namesake Ögii Lake.
