= Tsenkher Hot Spring =

Hot spring in Tsenkher, Arkhangai, Mongolia

- Цэнхэр халуун рашааны
- Interactive map of Tsenkher Hot Spring
- Location: Tsenkher, Arkhangai, Mongolia
- Coordinates: 47°19′11.7″N 101°38′54.6″E
- Elevation: 1,850 m (6,070 ft)
- Type: hot spring
- Discharge: 10 liters/s
- Temperature: 86 °C (187 °F)

The Tsenkher Hot Spring (Mongolian: Цэнхэр халуун рашааны) is a hot spring in Tsenkher, Arkhangai Province, Mongolia.

== Geology ==
The hot spring is located at an elevation of 1,850 m above sea level. The temperature of the hot spring water reaches up to 86 °C, making it the second hottest hot spring in Mongolia. The spring produces about 10 liters of water per second.

== Architecture ==
There are several camps surrounding the hot spring area with indoor or outdoor bathing facilities.

== See also ==
- Geology of Mongolia
