= Suvraga Khairkhan =

Mountain in Arkhangai, Mongolia

Highest point
- Elevation: 3,179 m (10,430 ft)
- Coordinates: 47°3′22″N 101°21′57″E

Geography
- Location: Tsenkher, Arkhangai, Mongolia
- Parent range: Khangai Mountains

Suvraga Khairkhan (Mongolian: Суврага хайрхан, IPA: [sʊ́wrəq χɛ́rχəɴ]; lit. 'Mount Stupa') is a mountain of the Khangai Mountains range in the Tsenkher, Arkhangai Province in Mongolia. It has an elevation of 3,179 metres (10,430 ft) and is considered a regional sacred mountain.

The Suvraga Khairkhan is the pivotal point between the watersheds of the Orkhon, Tamir and Tsetserleg rivers, with the main source of the Orkhon right at its foot to the south, and tributaries of the other two to the west and north.
