= Ögii Nuur =

Ögii Nuur may refer to

- Ögii Lake (nuur = lake), in Mongolia
- Ögii Nuur District, in Mongolia
