= Tsagaan Buurug Lake =

Lake in Erdenemandal, Arkhangai Province, Mongolia

- Бөөрөг цагаан нуур (Mongolian)
- Location within Mongolia
- Location: Erdenemandal, Arkhangai, Mongolia
- Coordinates: 48°39′34.1″N 101°12′13.1″E
- Type: lake
- Surface area: 32.5 hectares (80 acres)
- Water volume: 500,000 cubic metres (18,000,000 cu ft)

The Tsagaan Buurug Lake (Mongolian: Бөөрөг цагаан нуур) is a lake in Erdenemandal, Arkhangai Province, Mongolia.

== History ==
In 2020, a 910 meter water channel was dug connecting the lake to the nearby Buurug River. The project was initiated by the Ministry of Environment and Tourism to restore the lake, improve water access to the local community and help ensure the ecosystem stability of the region.

== Geology ==
The lake has a total surface area of 32.5 hectares. It has a total water volume of 500,000 m^{3}.

== See also ==
- Geology of Mongolia
