= Longcheng, Mongolia =

Ancient Xiongnu capital in Mongolia

Longcheng
- Dragon City
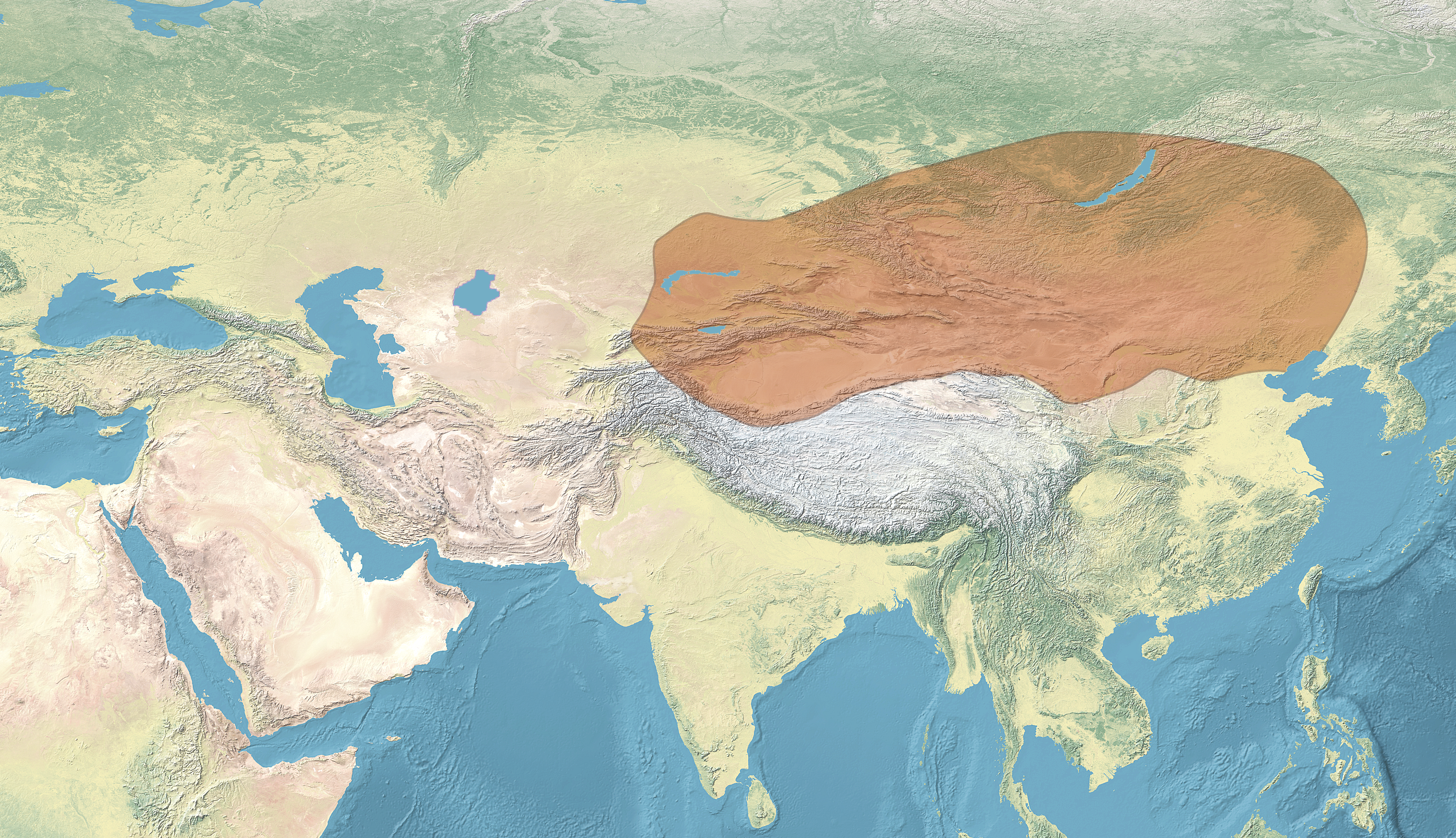
- 150 BCE map of the Xiongnu Empire

- Location of Longcheng in Mongolia
- 48.1030°N 102.5606°E
- Type: Settlement
- Location: Arkhangai Province, Mongolia
- Region: Ulzitt District
- Part of: Xiongnu Empire

Site notes
- Excavation dates: 18 July 2020
- Archaeologists: Tumur-Ochir Iderkhangai

Longcheng, also called Lungcheng, Luut, or Dragon City, was an ancient city of the Xiongnu Empire (c.300 BCE–200 AD) in modern-day Mongolia. The site was discovered by Mongolian archaeologists in 2017, near Ulziit District in Arkhangai Province. It served as the empire's meeting place and de facto capital. This site was not permanent, rather, it was a seasonal or temporary place for high-ranking people in the empire to gather.

== Discovery ==
Although Longcheng was discovered some time in 2017, the archaeological site was excavated around 18 July 2020 following financial burdens which delayed further inquiry. When it was inspected, a roof inscription in an archaic Chinese language was revealed, translating to 'Son of Heaven Chanyu', the first time this text was found on any physical object in Mongolia.
