= New Karakorum =

Planned city in Mongolia

New Karakorum Хархорум (Kharkhorum)
- Karakorum
- Location of Karakorum in Mongolia New Karakorum (Asia)
- Coordinates: 47°12′37″N 102°50′52″E
- Country: Mongolia
- Provinces: Arkhangai Province and Övörkhangai Province
- Presidential decree: 29 December 2022
- State Great Khural legislation: 23 January 2023
- Construction begins: 15 June 2025

Government
  - Body: Urban Planning Administration of New Kharkhorum City
  - Mayor: Khaltar Luvsan

Area
  - Total: 1.89 km^{2} (0.73 sq mi)
- Time zone: UTC+08:00 (ULAT)
- Website: en.kharkhorum.gov.mn

New Karakorum, or simply Karakorum (Mongolian: Хархорум, romanized: Kharkhorum), is a planned city currently under construction in Mongolia. Built near the site of the ruined city of Karakorum, once the capital of the Mongol Empire, the new city is intended to reduce pressure on the overcrowded modern capital of Ulaanbaatar.

Plans to create a new capital city have been raised since the early 21st century, as pressure on Ulaanbaatar increased. A presidential decree to create a new city on the site of Karakorum was issued in 2022, albeit without plans to shift the capital there. The government envisioned a purposefully designed smart city and held a design competition in 2024. A ceremony was held in June 2025 to officially begin construction. The government plans for the city to be able to support 30,000 people within the next decade, and 500,000 by 2050.

== Background ==
New Karakorum is located around 350 kilometres (220 mi) from the capital of Ulaanbaatar.

The ancient city of Karakorum was built in the Orkhon Valley to be the capital of the Mongol Empire. The location, already an important political site for Mongol tribes, was chosen for the empire's capital by Genghis Khan. However, construction of a permanent walled city only began under his successor, Ögedei Khan. Mongol leaders tended to live in tents near the site, with the fixed city mostly built and inhabited by immigrants. Karakorum remained the capital of two further Khans, after which Kublai Khan shifted his capital to Dadu (Beijing). Following the fall of the Yuan dynasty in 1368, Karakorum was destroyed by the Ming dynasty in 1388. Most of what remained was repurposed for the construction of Erdene Zuu Monastery in the late 1500s.

The population of the capital of modern Mongolia, Ulaanbaatar, has tripled in modern times, and the city now holds between a third and half of all people in the country. The city is surrounded by mountains, limiting further expansion. Many recent residents settled into informal ger districts, which lack basic planning or infrastructure. This unplanned urban sprawl created issues including heavy traffic and air pollution. During the 20th century, the Mongolian People's Republic built multiple planned cities with support from the Soviet Union. However, none had been built since 1990.

President Tsakhiagiin Elbegdorj raised the idea of creating a new capital city in the late 2000s. Other countries have constructed new capitals in recent years, including Nusantara in Indonesia and Sejong City in South Korea. The eventual successful proposal to build New Karakorum came alongside plans to develop a satellite city to Ulaanbaatar in the Khushigt Valley.

== Design ==
Ögii Lake is part of a planned tourist zone

The Mongolian government envisions the new capital will be a "smart city", 70% powered by renewable energy. The master plan includes an airport, an agricultural zone, a 500,000-person residential zone, a logistics zone, and a tourist zone next to Ögii Lake. The site of the old city is planned to be converted into a museum. Water bodies are to be restored, with new trees planted around them. A high-speed rail line is planned between New Karakorum and Ulaanbaatar. As of 2025, the city was planned to be 50% green space, 30% buildings, and 20% roads.

Through Resolution No. 21 in 2024, the government announced an international design competition. Applications were accepted from 18 March to 15 April. Of the 76 entries, a shortlist of 36 was issued on 16 July. Following a period for public feedback, the competition was jointly won by two teams from China.

Visions of the city's future purpose have differed. While the city was originally proposed as a new capital, the eventually approved plan instead emphasised the restoration of the site of Karakorum, with perhaps the relocation of some but not all government agencies. The government projects that 500,000 people will live in the city in 2050, which is expected to be about a tenth of the national population. It is not expected that the city will be ready to host any government institutions before 2050.

== Planning and development ==
On 29 December 2022, the 111th Independence Day anniversary, President Ukhnaagiin Khürelsükh issued a "Decree on Restoring the Ancient Capital of the Great Mongol Empire". Following this, 189.36319 hectares (467.9266 acres) of the Orkhon Valley were allocated to the project. This land came from Arkhangai Province and Övörkhangai Province, and lies approximately 350 kilometres (220 mi) southwest of Ulaanbaatar.

In January 2023, the State Great Khural passed a resolution approving the concept. In February, a planning agency was established. On 23 January 2025, legislation laying out plans for the city was passed which established a development fund. The government created the Urban Planning Administration of New Kharkhorum City in February, and Khaltar Luvsan was appointed as mayor on 6 March.

Early work included the construction of irrigation systems, wells, parking, sidewalks, and lighting. Public and private groups planted 550,000 trees, out of an eventual goal of 1 million. On 15 June 2025, Khürelsükh spoke at a ceremony marking the official start of construction, at a site named the "Great Khaans' Garden". The government aims for the city to hold 30,000 people by 2035.

== Challenges ==
There is very little infrastructure in the New Karakorum site, with the nearest settlement being the small town of Kharkhorin.

As the city will be an entirely new development, all infrastructure, including connections to Ulaanbaatar, needs to be built from scratch. The construction of the city is expected to cost at least tens of billions, in a country with a gross domestic product of just $25 billion. The Mongolian government is seeking public–private partnerships to finance some parts of the development. Investments from China have funded bridges and other infrastructure. The Russian company Rosatom has proposed building small modular nuclear reactors to provide power.

Concerns have also been raised about the potential destruction of archaeological material. The Orkhon Valley is a World Heritage Site, and the old city of Karakorum is being actively researched. Construction risks damaging evidence of the old city and other material that remains underground.
