= Tsetserleg =

Tsetserleg (Mongolian: Цэцэрлэг, garden) may signify:

- Tsetserleg (city), the capital of Arkhangai aimag in Mongolia
- two sums (districts) in different aimags of Mongolia:
  - Tsetserleg, Arkhangai
  - Tsetserleg, Khövsgöl
