= Ögii nuur, Arkhangai =

District in Arkhangai Province, Mongolia

Coordinates: 47°40′05″N 102°33′02″E

Ögii nuur District Өгийнуур сум ᠥᠭᠦᠢᠨᠠᠭᠤᠷᠰᠤᠮᠤ
- District
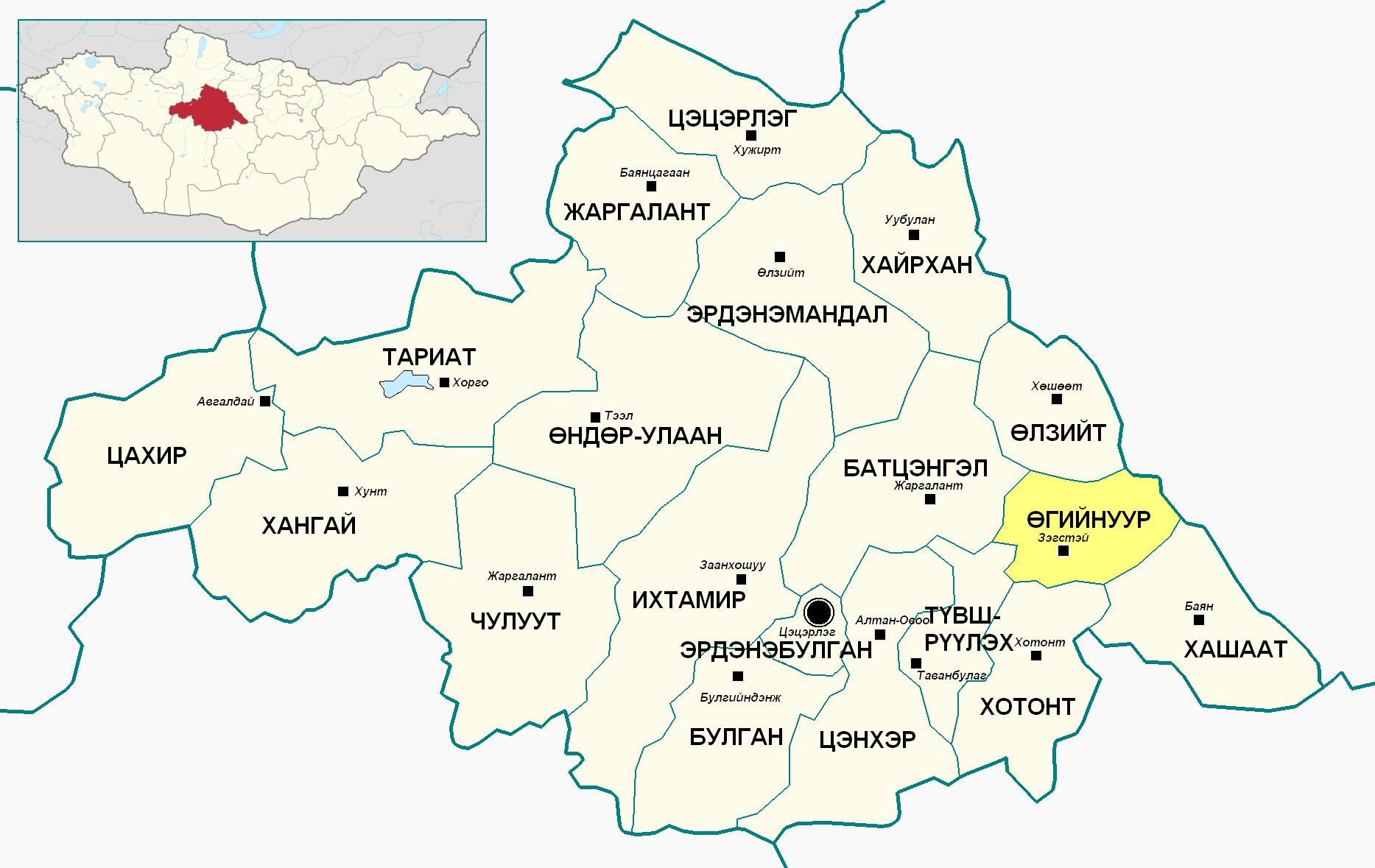
- Ögii Nuur District in Arkhangai Province
- Country: Mongolia
- Province: Arkhangai Province

Area
  - Total: 1,686.5 km^{2} (651.2 sq mi)
- Time zone: UTC+8 (UTC + 8)
- Website: http://ugiinuur.ar.gov.mn/

Ögii Lake (Mongolian: Өгийнуур [ɵg̊íː nʊːɾ]) is a district in the east of Arkhangai Province in central Mongolia, near the confluence of the Tamir and Orkhon rivers. The sum is named after Ögii Lake. The administrative center is located some 100 km from Tsetserleg. In 2009, its population was 3,086.

== Administrative divisions ==
The district is divided into five bags, which are:

- Doit
- Orkhon
- Toglokh
- Ugii
- Zegstei

== Tourist attractions ==
- Ögii Lake
