= Museum of Arkhangai Province =

Museum in Tsetserleg, Arkhangai, Mongolia

- Архангай аймгийн музей
- Established: 1947
- Location: Tsetserleg, Arkhangai, Mongolia
- Coordinates: 47°28′50.4″N 101°27′07.9″E
- Type: museum

The Museum of Arkhangai Province (Mongolian: Архангай аймгийн музей) is a museum in Tsetserleg, Arkhangai Province, Mongolia.

== History ==
The museum was established in 1947.

== Architecture ==
The museum is housed in the Zayayn Gegeenii Sum temple complex. The museum consists of six exhibition halls.

== Exhibitions ==
The museum displays various collections on historical, traditional and cultural artifacts of Arkhangai Province.

== See also ==
- List of museums in Mongolia
