= Ulaan Tsutgalan Waterfall =

Waterfall in Bat-Ölzii, Övörkhangai, Mongolia

Ulaan Tsutgalan Waterfall Улаан цутгалан
- Interactive map of Ulaan Tsutgalan Waterfall; Улаан цутгалан
- Location: Bat-Ölzii, Övörkhangai, Mongolia
- Coordinates: 46°47′14.1″N 101°57′36.9″E
- Type: waterfall
- Total height: 24 m (79 ft)
- Total width: 10 m (33 ft)
- Watercourse: Orkhon River

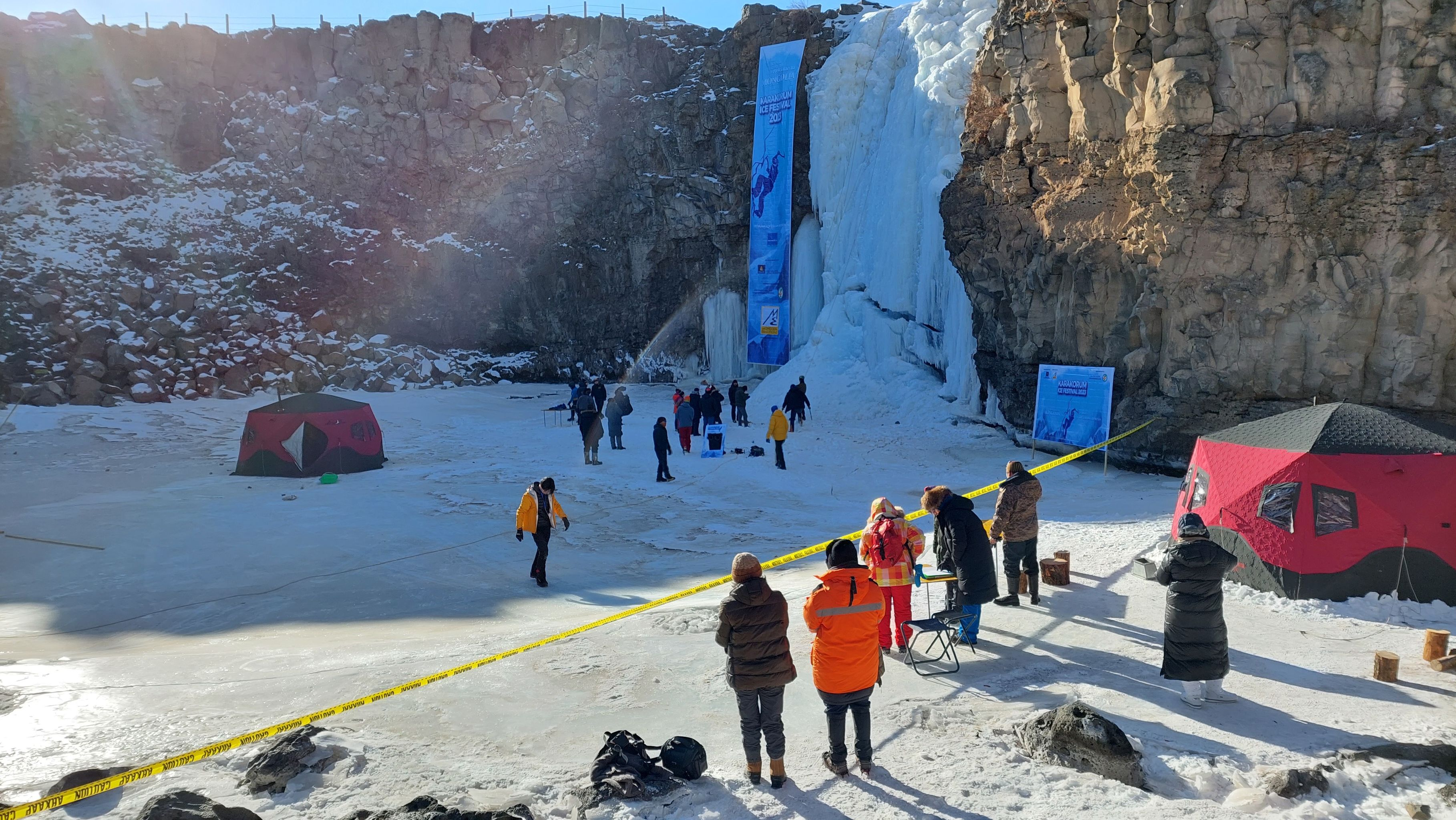
Ice climbing contest at the Ulaan tsutgalan. The frozen state of the waterfall

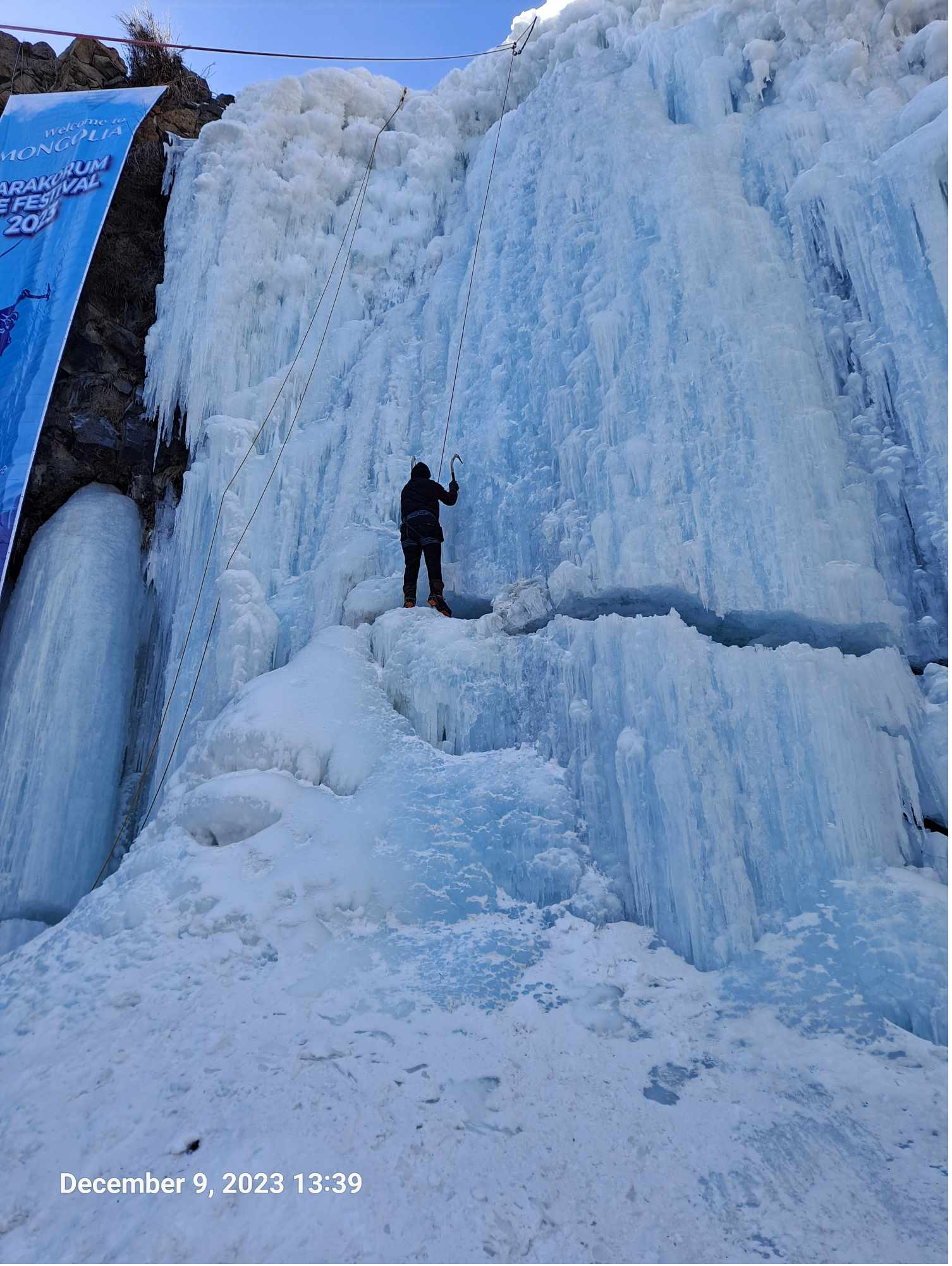
Ice climbing contest at the Ulaan tsutgalan. The frozen state of the waterfall

The Ulaan Tsutgalan Waterfall (Mongolian: Улаан цутгалан) is a waterfall in Bat-Ölzii District, Övörkhangai Province, Mongolia.

== History ==
During the Quaternary period, a volcanic eruption occurred at the source of Tsagaan Azarga River. Lava flew down the Orkhon Valley and created thick layers of volcanic rock which spanned for several kilometers. The Orkhon River then passed through these layers creating the canyon of the waterfall today.

== Geology ==
The waterfall stands at a height of 24 meters and a width of 10 meters. It is the widest waterfall in Mongolia. It receives water from the Orkhon River.

== Activities ==
The waterfall and the surrounding area is also the venue for the annual Karakorum Ice Festival. The festival also includes ice archery, ice knucklebones shooting, and speed skating.

== See also ==
- Geology of Mongolia
- List of waterfalls
