= Baabar =

Mongolian political analyst and writer

- Баабар
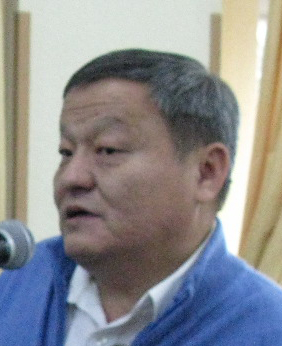

Personal details
- Born: October 26, 1954 (age 71) Tsetserleg, Arkhangai, Mongolia
- Spouse: Amarsanaa L. (1962)
- Children: Myadagmaa (1986) Udval (1992)
- Occupation: Politician Publisher Writer
- Website: www.baabar.mn

Bat-Erdeniin Batbayar (Mongolian: Бат-Эрдэнийн Батбаяр; born October 26, 1954), better known as Baabar (/ˈbɑːbɑːr/; Mongolian: Баабар [báːbər̥]), is a Mongolian retired politician, political analyst, conservative writer, public intellectual, political commentator and novelist.

== Education ==
Baabar (Bat-Erdeniin Batbayar) was born in 1954—a biochemist and educated at the Jagiellonian University, Poland, Moscow University, Russia and The Imperial College of Science, Technology and Medicine, in London.. His professional field is biophysics, biochemistry, and molecular genetics. He was involved in research work in the field of enzymology. He won an international intellectual property award for his work on the physical and chemical characteristics of yak's alpha chymotrypsin. He holds the title of professor of history from the Mongolian Academy of Sciences.

Father Tumenbuuchiin Bat-Erdene (1926–2001) was a scientist, and Mother Buddorjiin Buzmaa (1934–2015) was a teacher of Geography. Brother Enkhbayar (1957) (officer) and sister Delgherbayar (1962) (Technologist of the food industry).

== Political career ==
Baabar was a samizdat dissident since his student days. Under a pseudonym, he wrote articles criticizing the social system and distributed them in a particular circle. Baabar was arrested and imprisoned in 1979 for translating A. Solzhenitsyn's political essay “Жить не по лжи!” [Live not by lies!] into Mongolian and distributing it to his friends. After his release from prison, he changed his pseudonym to Baabar, which he used as his official surname in 1990. In 1987, while studying in Moscow, he wrote an essay called "Don't Forget" under the pseudonym Baabar, photocopied it, and sent it to Mongolia. It was immediately published in tens of thousands of copies as samizdat and spread widely. It became the slogan of the democratic revolution that took place in Mongolia in 1989–1990.

Baabar is Mongolia's most famous publicist, writer and social critic. During communism, he began writing samizdat under a pen name, criticizing political critics, and he was jailed for his works. At first critical of socialism from within a socialist framework, by mid-1980, he had begun to question socialism itself. He continued his writing into the 1990s, often offering highly opinionated views of Mongolian society.

In 1989, he founded a semi-secret mass movement called the Democratic Socialist Movement with his friends, university professors and academics. In January 1990, the Mongolian Social Democratic Party was established, and he was elected its first chairman. The party participated in the first free democratic elections held in July 1990 and won a seat in the newly formed parliament. Subsequently, in the general elections held in 1996, the Social Democratic Party won together with the Mongolian Democratic Party, creating the first non-communist government in Mongolian history.

Baabar was elected as a member of parliament in the State Great Hural and served as Minister of Finance from 1998 to 1999. As a member of parliament, he was responsible for the Mongolian Army, the Mongolian CIA, and the Mongolian Police. Baabar reformed the Mongolian Army, leading the reform of the doctrine, structure, mission, location, and responsibilities of the army in a democratic environment, and initiated and passed 13 fundamental laws on the structure and duties of the military. From 1966 to 1990, 100,000 Soviet troops were stationed in Mongolia, and the Mongolian army was part of the 5th Army of the Soviet Trans-Baikal Military District. The reform of the Mongolian army not only made the Mongolian army an independent structure but also gave it the right to participate in international peacekeeping operations. The Mongolian military began to defend its country through diplomatic means, rather than through armed forces. Thus, representatives of the Mongolian army participated in the wars in Iraq and Afghanistan, and also participated in peacekeeping forces in several African countries. Now, Mongolia is an official NATO partner.

Baabar was appointed Minister of Finance in 1998, and immediately after his appointment, he reformed the banking system of Mongolia. Until then, there were many commercial banks in Mongolia, but most of them were government-owned. That was a massive source of corruption. State banks gave loans to people without any criteria and took 15-20 percent of the proceeds. The total amount of unpaid loans of banks is now 10 times greater than the state's reserves. The main goal of the reform is to make the state responsible only for the Central Bank, and to transfer all commercial banks to private or corporate ownership.

== Views and activism ==
Baabar withdrew from politics in 2000 and left the party. Since then, he has been an active social activist and a strong critic of the populism of Mongolian political parties. In 2003, he founded Eagle TV, a CNN and BBC-style news channel, with American supporters, which has been the largest news channel for more than 20 years. He also founded Toim, a weekly magazine similar to Time and Newsweek in the United States. In 2005, he founded the website Baabar.mn, which brought together more than 50 of Mongolia's most widely read authors, journalists, and talented writers. In 2006, he founded Nepko Publishing Company, where he serves as the chairman of the board of directors. About 70 percent of the company's products are translations of Western literature in the fields of economics, philosophy, dictionaries, biographies, political science, science, and medicine. In this field, Nepko Publishing collaborates with world-renowned publishing companies such as National Geographic, Britannica, DK, Oxford, and Cambridge. For example, in this direction, in collaboration with Britannica, Britannica published a 12-volume encyclopedia, adding 5,000 new Mongolian-related terminologies. Nepko has become the largest publishing house in Mongolia today.

Baabar has been a regular columnist for Mongolia's largest daily newspaper, "Odrin Sonin," for the past 30 years. He has written nearly a thousand articles for the newspaper.

In 2000, Baabar initiated and established a non-governmental organization called the "Northeast Asia Association" to develop people-to-people diplomacy with East Asian countries. That included Japan, Northeast China, the Russian Far East, South Korea, and North Korea. Although Mongolia is geographically part of Inner Asia, it has made efforts to include Mongolia in this region politically and economically. Although the association is a non-governmental organization, it has worked with all successive governments to promote Mongolia's inclusion and cooperation in the area, working with state and non-state organizations in East Asian countries. The association's goal is to foster closer ties with the nations of the Northeast Asia region, overcome ideological differences, and strengthen economic ties with Mongolia, particularly in the area. In this context, Baabar not only visited North Korea about 20 times, but also initiated food aid to North Korea many times, mediated visits by Mongolian Prime Ministers and Presidents, and invited North Korean labourers to work in Mongolia.

During the same years, he participated in many meetings and workshops on Northeast Asia and the Korean Peninsula and gave lectures on these issues. In addition, he was invited to give lectures at about twenty foreign universities on topics such as Northeast Asia, the Korean Peninsula, Mongolian history, and the current political and economic situation of Mongolia.

Baabar is an active writer for the international website Academia.edu, where he has written dozens of articles in English and Russian.

== Writing ==
Since Mongolia became an open and democratic society, Baabar has written and translated about 70 books. He has set a record by selling about 600,000 books in the Mongolian market. He has translated more than 20 books, mainly from English, on science, economics and government.

He became interested in Mongolian history, especially the history of the 20th century, in the 1980s. The modern history of Mongolia was written by the USSR Academy of Sciences in 1953, establishing an unshakable ideological rule that Mongolians have been forced to memorize for generations, learning from propaganda history filled with lies. Since 1990, the opening of secret archives not only in Mongolia but also in the Soviet Union and Taiwan has opened up the opportunity to write a new history truthfully. Thus, in 1996, Baabar's book "The New History of Mongolia" was published, which was translated into English by Cambridge University in 1999 and published under the title "Twentieth Century Mongolia". Since then, the book has been expanded and re-edited five times and translated into about 10 foreign languages, including French, Russian, and Turkish.

== Personal life ==
In 1985, Baabar married Amarsanaa Luvsandorjiin (1962), with whom he had attended a research institution. Amarsanaa studied optical physics at Kharkiv University in Ukraine and Genetic engineering at the Academy of Soviet Science in Moscow and Imperial College in London. Since 2000, she has been engaged in the book business and worked as a lexicographer, creating the Oxford English-Mongolian Dictionary, the Collins Mongolian-English Dictionary, and the English-Mongolian Dictionary. She has also translated about ten works from English into Mongolian on economics, medicine, and science.

The couple's daughter, Myadagmaa, was born in June 1986 (economist), and their daughter Udval was born in August 1992 (UX designer). They now have four grandchildren (2017, 2019, 2024 and 2025).

== Publications ==
- Баабар Бүү март (Don't forget). [English version The History of Mongolia vol 3 Part 5: Twentieth-century Mongolia; 45. Baabar (1990) “Buu mart!”. Edited by David Sneath and Christopher Kaplonski; Global Oriented LTD UK.]
- Баабар ХХ зууны монгол – Нүүдэл суудал (1996) Улаанбаатар. [20th Century Mongolia - From nomadism to settled life]
- Baabar Twentieth Century Mongolia The White Horse Press. Cambridge 1999
- Baabar Histoire de la Mongolie. Éditions Petra; Paris (2023)
- Баабар История Монголии: от мирового господства до советского сателита Татарское книжное издательство. Казань – 2010. [Baabar History of Mongolia – From World Power to Soviet Satellite. Tatar bookpublishing Kazan (2010)]
- Baabar Almanac History of Mongolia . National Geography. 2022
- Baabar The Great Purge The History of Mongolia vol 3 Part 5: Twentieth-century Mongolia; 45. Edited by David Sneath and Christopher Kaplonski; Global Oriented LTD UK
- Baabar. The Concise History of Mongolia Nepko publishing Ulaanbaatar (2024)
