= Ölziit, Arkhangai =

District in Arkhangai Province, Mongolia

Coordinates: 48°06′02″N 102°33′30″E

Ölziit District Өлзийт сум ᠥᠯᠵᠡᠶᠢᠲᠦᠰᠤᠮᠤ
- District
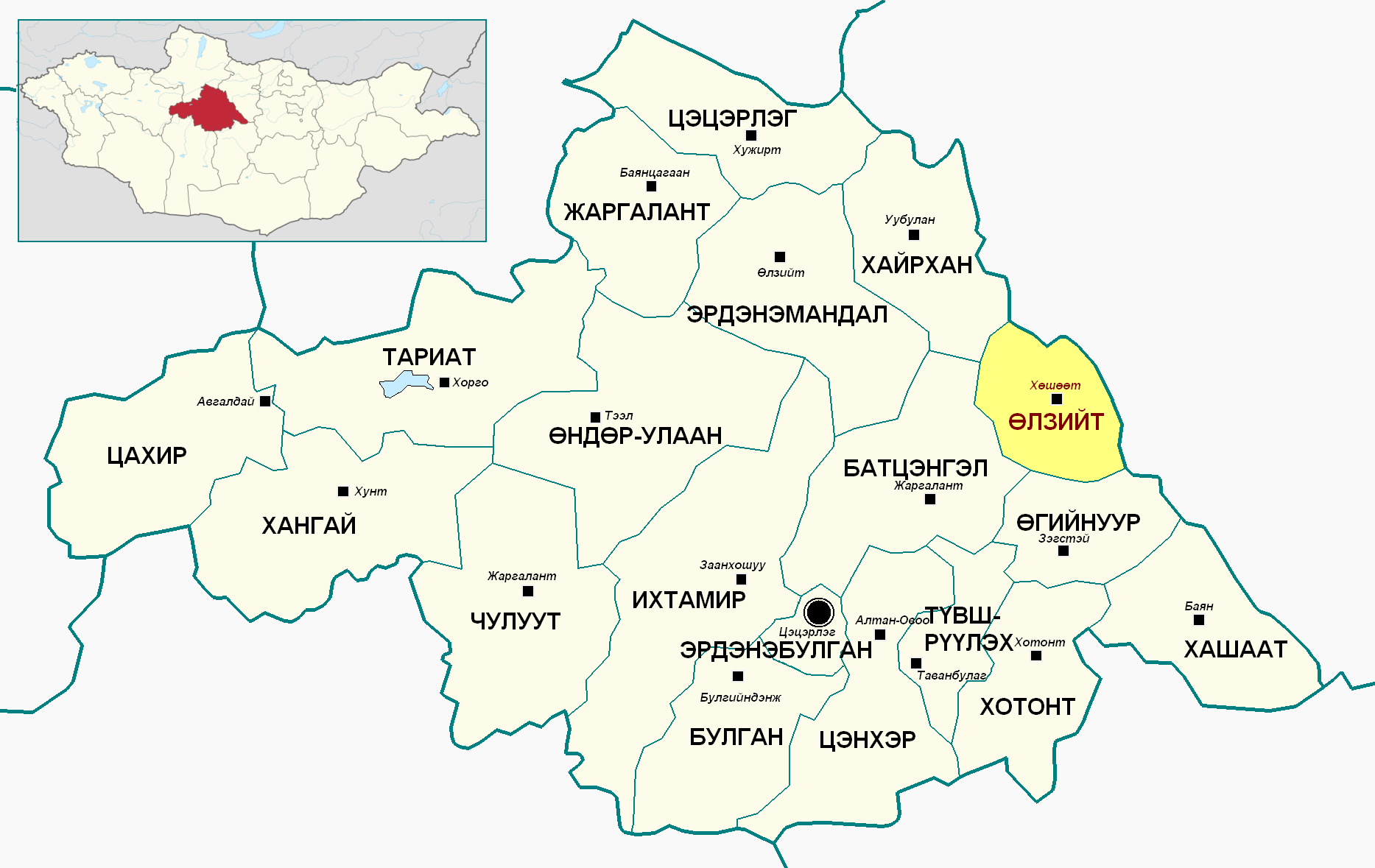
- Ölziit District in Arkhangai Province
- Country: Mongolia
- Province: Arkhangai Province

Area
  - Total: 1,700 km^{2} (660 sq mi)
- Time zone: UTC+8 (UTC + 8)

Ölziit (Mongolian: Өлзийт, Blessed) is a sum (district) of Arkhangai Province in central Mongolia. There is a concrete bridge over the Orkhon River just east of the sum center. In 2009, its population was 3,102.

== Administrative divisions ==
The district is divided into four bags, which are:

- Baishir
- Bodont
- Khushuut
- Yamaat
