= Öndör-Ulaan =

District in Arkhangai Province, Mongolia

Coordinates: 48°02′38″N 100°30′25″E

Öndör-Ulaan District Өндөр-Улаан сум ᠥᠨᠳᠦᠷᠤᠯᠠᠭᠠᠨᠰᠤᠮᠤ
- District
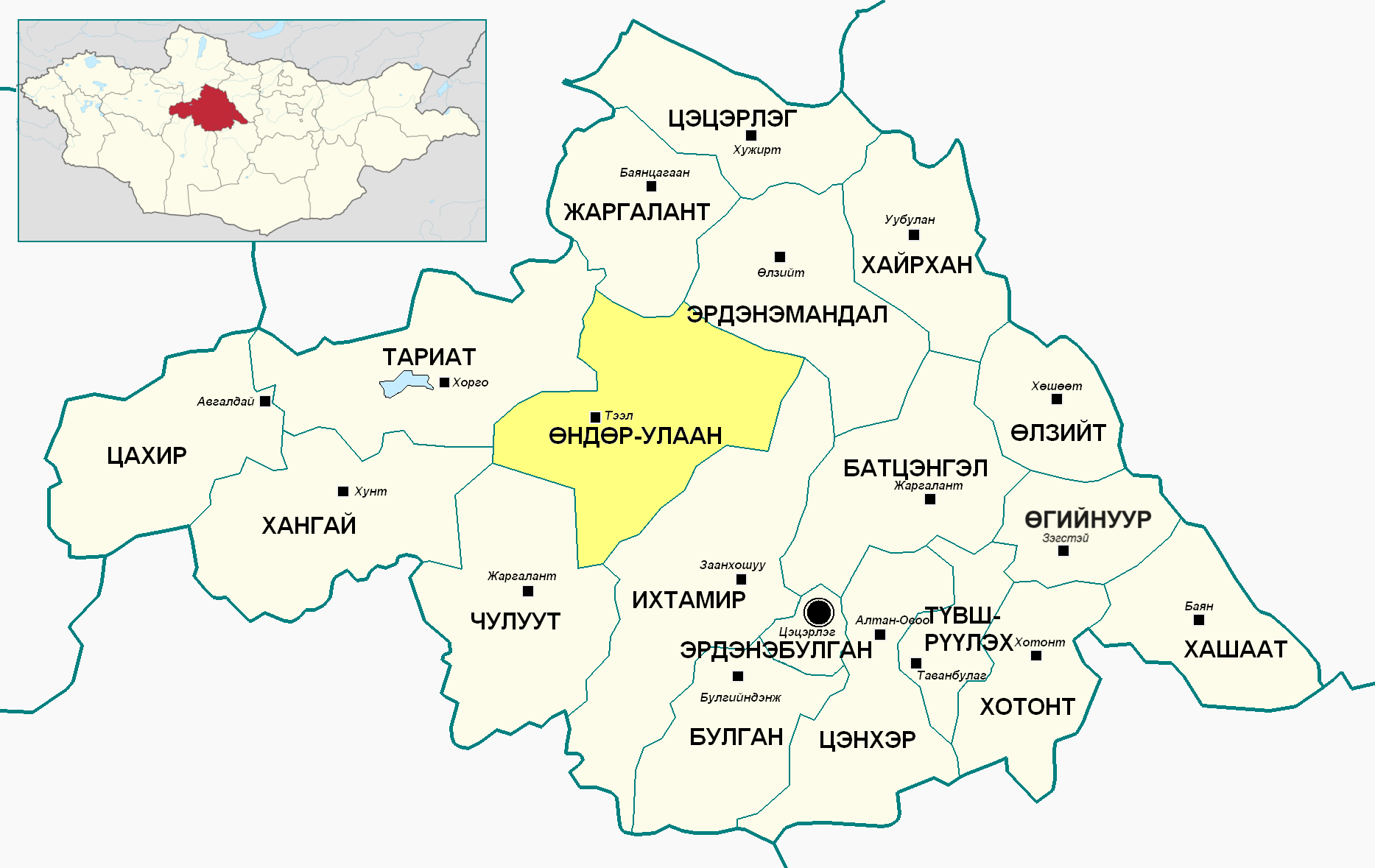
- Öndör-Ulaan District in Arkhangai Province
- Country: Mongolia
- Province: Arkhangai Province

Area
  - Total: 4,000 km^{2} (1,500 sq mi)
- Time zone: UTC+8 (UTC + 8)

Öndör Ulaan (Mongolian: Өндөр-Улаан; lit. 'lofty red') is a district of Arkhangai Province in central Mongolia. As of the 2009 census, its population was 5,798.

== Administrative divisions ==
The district is divided into five bags, which are:

- Azarga
- Belkhi
- Dongoi
- Khanui
- Teel
