= Khairkhan =

District in Arkhangai Province, Mongolia

Coordinates: 48°36′24″N 101°56′13″E

Khairkhan District Хайрхан сум ᠬᠠᠶᠢᠷᠬᠠᠨᠰᠤᠮᠤ
- District
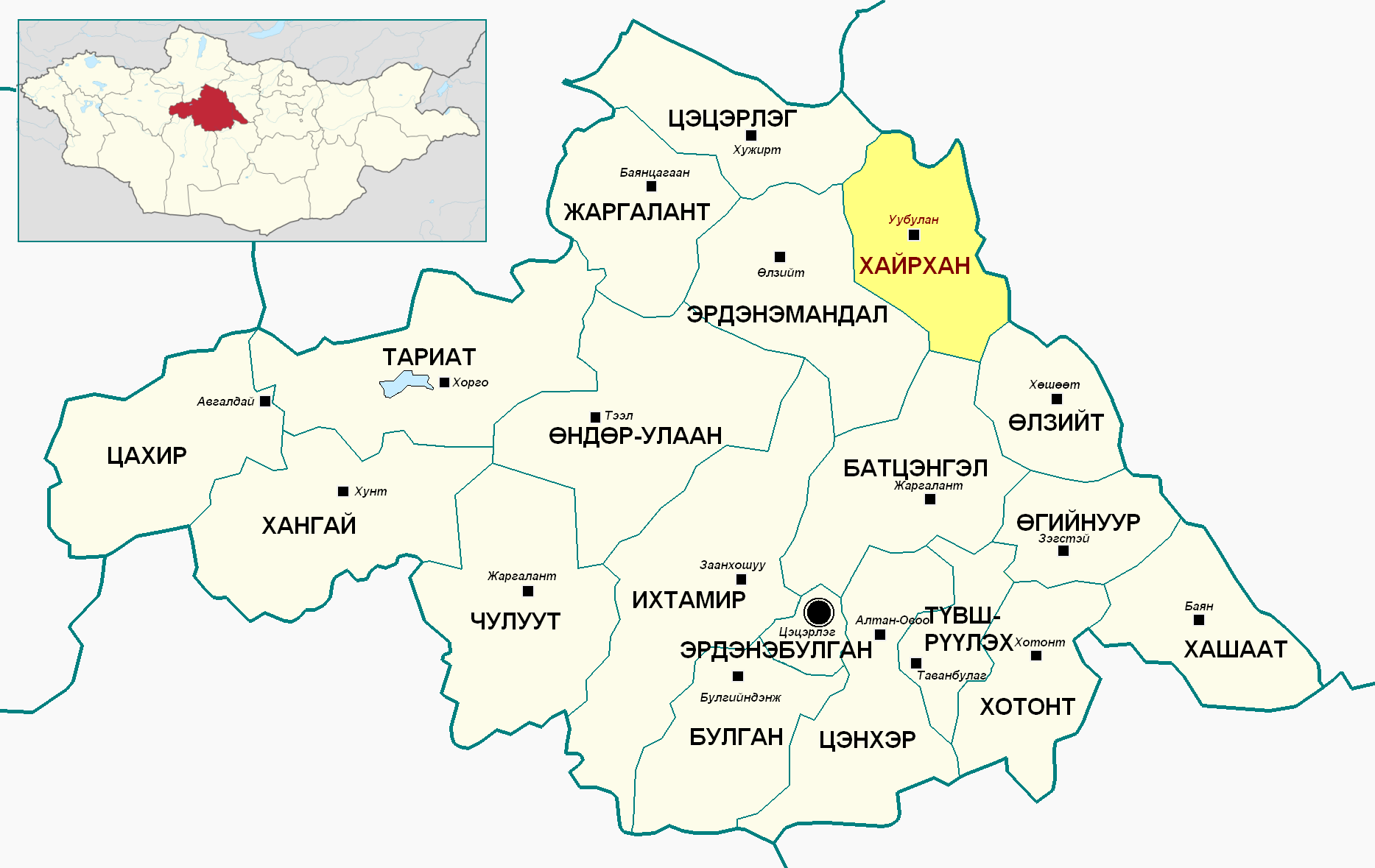
- Khairkhan District in Arkhangai Province
- Country: Mongolia
- Province: Arkhangai Province

Area
  - Total: 2,500 km^{2} (970 sq mi)
- Time zone: UTC+8 (UTC + 8)

Khairkhan (Mongolian: Хайрхан, romanized: Hairhan; "mountain") is a sum (district) of Arkhangai Province in central Mongolia. In 2009, its population was 3,656.

== Administrative divisions ==
The district is divided into five bags, which are:

- Asgat
- Jarantai
- Khairkhan
- Mogoi
- Uguumur
