= Ikh-Tamir =

District in Arkhangai Province, Mongolia

Coordinates: 47°35′40″N 101°12′17″E

Ikh-Tamir District Ихтамир сум ᠶᠡᠬᠡᠲᠠᠮᠢᠷᠰᠤᠮᠤ
- District
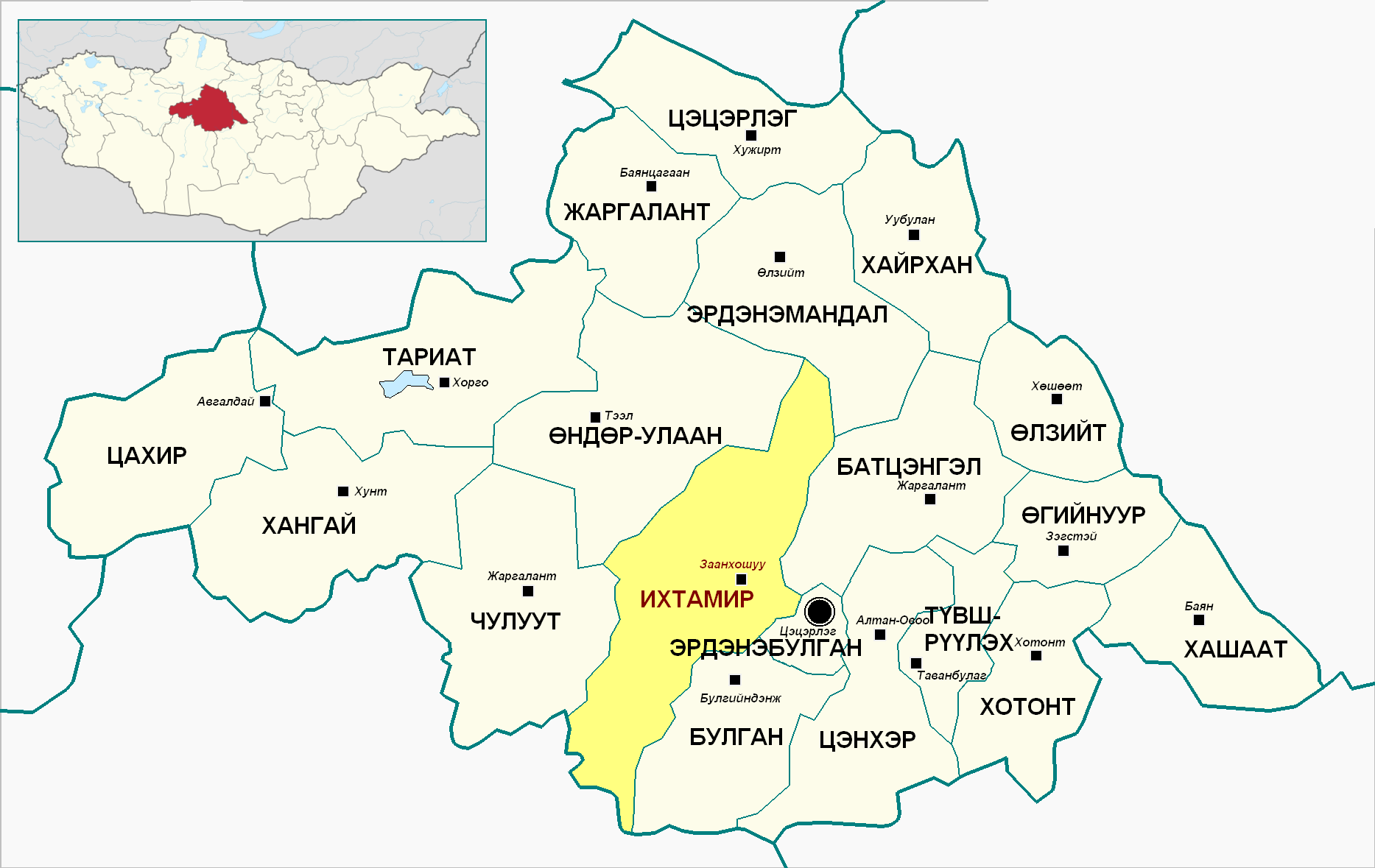
- Ikh-Tamir District in Arkhangai Province
- Country: Mongolia
- Province: Arkhangai Province

Area
  - Total: 4,800 km^{2} (1,900 sq mi)
- Time zone: UTC+8 (UTC + 8)
- Website: http://ikhtamir.ar.gov.mn/

Ikh-Tamir (Mongolian: Их тамир [ix tʰɛ́mɪr]; lit. 'Great Tamir') is a district of Arkhangai Province in central Mongolia, through which the Tamir River flows. According to the 2009 census, its population was 5,247.

== Administrative divisions ==
The district is divided into six bags, which are:

- Bort
- Bugat
- Erdenetolgoi
- Khan-Undur
- Khukhnuur
- Taikhar

== Prominent People ==
- Lkhagvasumberel Tumursukh, a biologist and environmentalist
