= Orkhon River =

Longest river in Mongolia

Orkhon
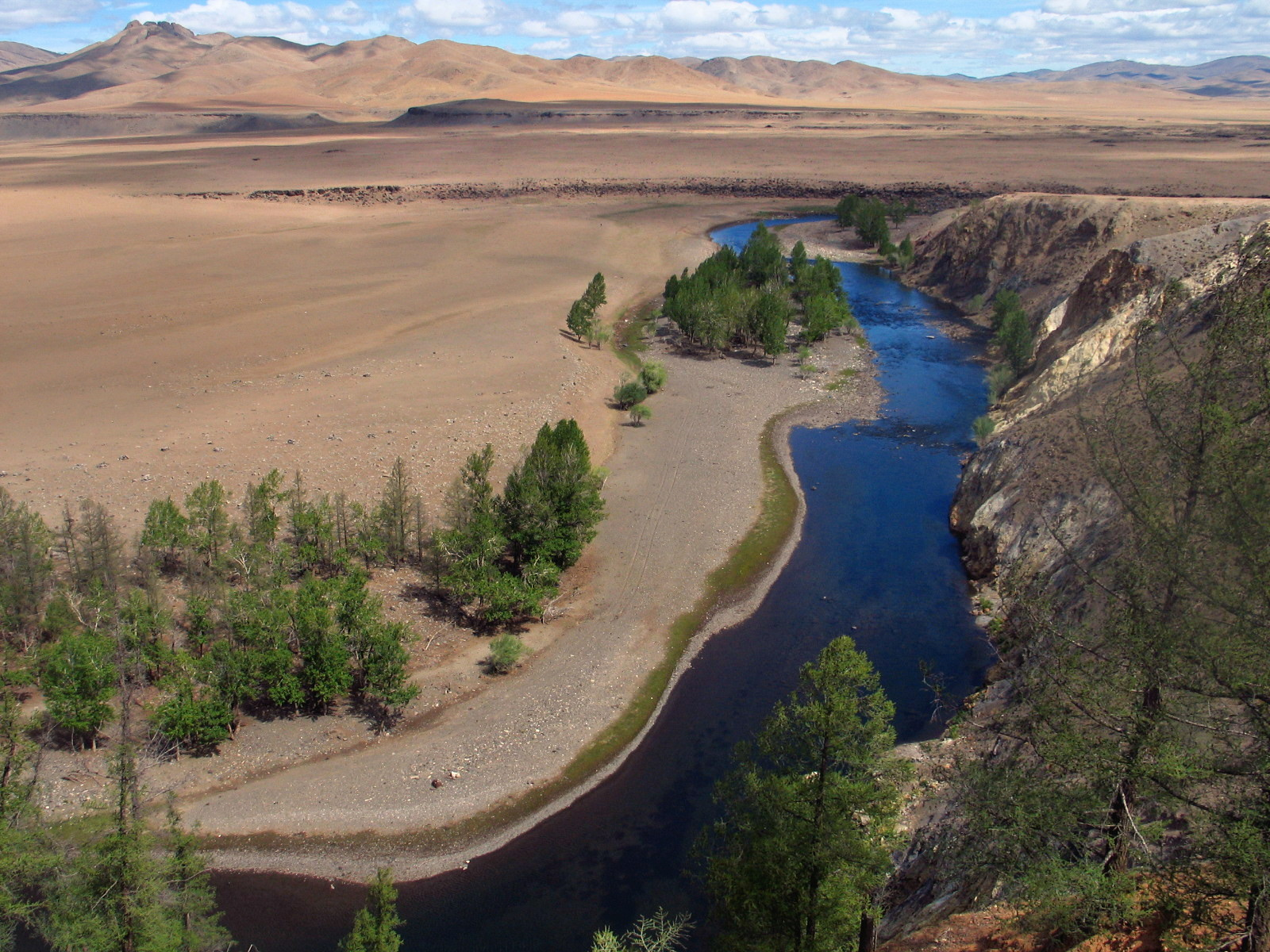
- Native name: Орхон (Mongolian)

Location
- Country: Mongolia
- Aimags: Övörkhangai, Arkhangai, Bulgan, Darkhan-Uul, Selenge
- Major cities: Kharkhorin (Karakorum), Sükhbaatar

Physical characteristics
- Source: Suvraga Khairkhan
  - location: Tsenkher sum, Arkhangai
  - coordinates: 47°2′59″N 101°20′30″E
- Mouth: Selenga
  - location: Sükhbaatar city, Selenge aimag
  - coordinates: 50°15′0″N 106°8′20″E
- Length: 1,124 km (698 mi)
- Basin size: 132,835 km^{2} (51,288 sq mi)
- Discharge
  - location: Bulgan
  - average: 66 m^{3}/s (2,300 cu ft/s)
  - minimum: 0.5 m^{3}/s (18 cu ft/s)February
  - maximum: 190.2 m^{3}/s (6,720 cu ft/s)July

Basin features
- Progression: Selenga→ Lake Baikal→ Angara→ Yenisey→ Kara Sea
- Tributaries
  - left: Tamir River
  - right: Tuul River, Kharaa River

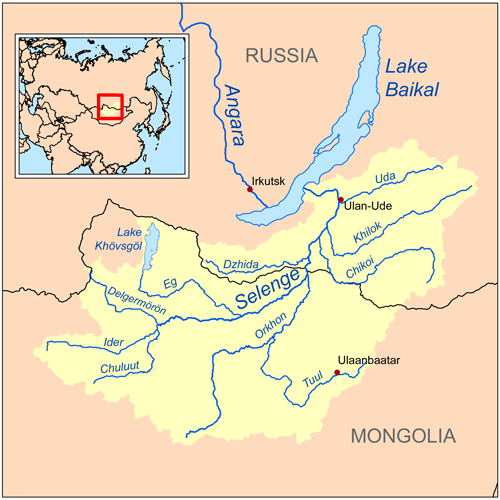

Ulaan Tsutgalan Waterfall

The Orkhon River (/ˈɔːrkɒn/ OR-kon) (Note: Mongolian: Орхон гол [ɔ́rχɞɴ‿ɢ̊ɜɬ]; Old Chinese: 安侯水 *arhoushui; Old Turkic: 𐰆𐰺𐰴𐰣, romanized: Orqan or Orqun in Tariat inscriptions) is the longest river in Mongolia. It rises in the Khangai Mountains in the Tsenkher sum of Arkhangai aimag at the foot of the Suvraga Khairkhan mountain. From there, it crosses the border into Övörkhangai aimag and follows the upper Orkhon valley in an eastern direction until it reaches Kharkhorin. On this stretch, very close to the Orkhon, the Ulaan Tsutgalan river features a waterfall, ten metres (33 ft) wide and twenty metres (66 ft) high, which is a popular destination for tourists.

From Kharkhorin it flows northwards until it reaches Bulgan aimag, and then north-east to join the Selenge River next to Sükhbaatar city in Selenge aimag, close to the Russian border. The Selenge then flows further north into Russia and Lake Baikal.

With 1,124 km (698 mi), the Orkhon is longer than the Selenge, making it the longest river in Mongolia. Major tributaries of the Orkhon river are the Tuul River and Tamir River.

There are two sets of ancient ruins along the river valley: Khar Balgas, the ancient capital of the Uyghur Kingdom and Karakorum, the ancient capital of the Mongol Empire. Pyotr Kuzmich Kozlov excavated several Xiongnu Imperial tombs in the area of the river valley.

Fish in the Orkhon River include pike, carp, perch, taimen and catfish.

UNESCO lists the Orkhon Valley as a World Heritage Site.

== Usage ==
In 2014, almost 40 million m^{3} of water was withdrawn from the river for domestic, livestock, cropland and industrial use.

== See also ==
- Khöshöö Tsaidam Monuments (World heritage site)
- List of rivers of Mongolia
