= Erdenemandal =

District in Arkhangai Province, Mongolia

Coordinates: 48°31′46″N 101°22′40″E

Erdenemandal District Эрдэнэмандал сум ᠡᠷᠳᠡᠨᠢᠮᠠᠨᠳᠠᠯᠰᠤᠮᠤ
- District
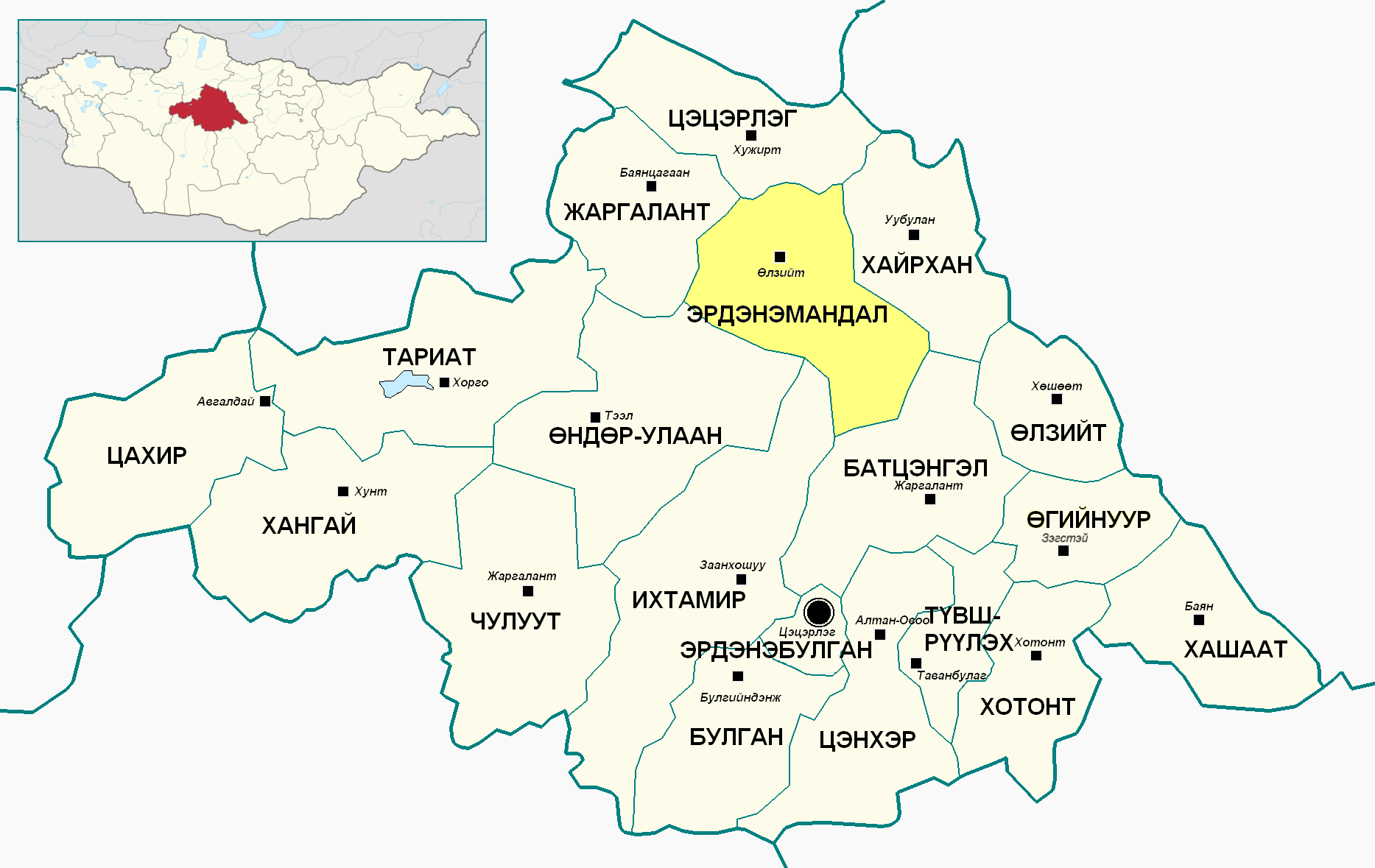
- Erdenemandal District in Arkhangai Province
- Country: Mongolia
- Province: Arkhangai Province

Area
  - Total: 3,363.3 km^{2} (1,298.6 sq mi)

Population (2022)
  - Total: 5,611
  - Density: 1.7/km^{2} (4.4/sq mi)
- Time zone: UTC+8 (UTC + 8)

Erdenenmandal (Mongolian: Эрдэнэмандал [írt(ɘ)nmántəɬ]) is a small town and district in Arkhangai Province, Mongolia.

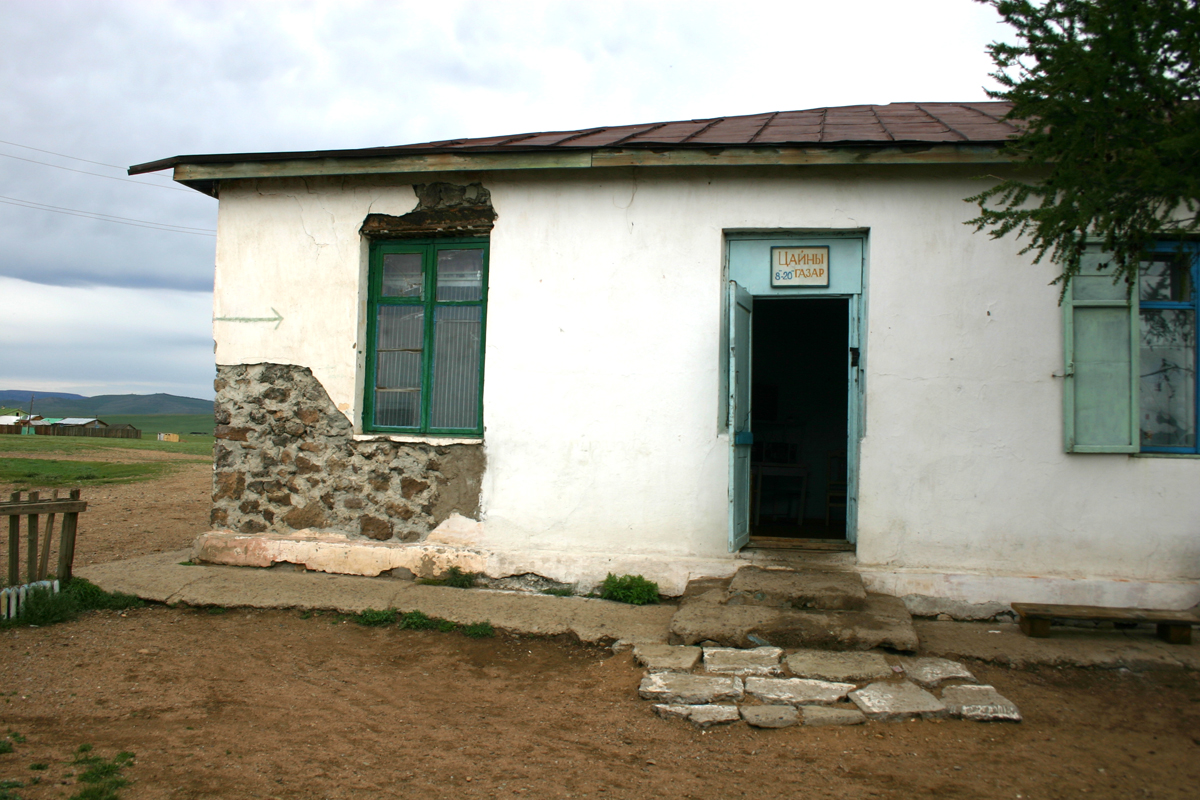
Erdenemandal Restaurant

There is a small central post office and a small market area. Basic supplies can be purchased at the market area. Diesel and gasoline are available but not on a regular basis. The area may go days or longer without fuel for vehicles.

During the harsh Mongolian winters nomads from many miles away may relocate to the outskirts of Erdenemandal, setting up their gers (or yurts) in a manner to protect themselves from wind and snow.

== Climate ==
Erdenemandal experiences a subarctic climate (Köppen Dwc) with long, dry, very cold winters and short, warm summers.

Climate data for Erdenemandal, elevation 1,509 m (4,951 ft), (1991–2020 normals, extremes 1964–1990, 1999–2023)
Month	Jan	Feb	Mar	Apr	May	Jun	Jul	Aug	Sep	Oct	Nov	Dec	Year
Record high °C (°F)	6.0 (42.8)	13.3 (55.9)	19.3 (66.7)	29.5 (85.1)	31.0 (87.8)	34.4 (93.9)	36.2 (97.2)	34.8 (94.6)	30.0 (86.0)	24.2 (75.6)	15.2 (59.4)	12.5 (54.5)	36.2 (97.2)
Mean daily maximum °C (°F)	−12.0 (10.4)	−6.6 (20.1)	1.8 (35.2)	11.2 (52.2)	17.4 (63.3)	22.7 (72.9)	24.0 (75.2)	21.9 (71.4)	16.7 (62.1)	8.2 (46.8)	−1.4 (29.5)	−9.5 (14.9)	7.9 (46.2)
Daily mean °C (°F)	−18.8 (−1.8)	−14.5 (5.9)	−6.0 (21.2)	3.2 (37.8)	9.5 (49.1)	14.9 (58.8)	16.9 (62.4)	14.6 (58.3)	8.6 (47.5)	0.5 (32.9)	−8.7 (16.3)	−15.6 (3.9)	0.4 (32.7)
Mean daily minimum °C (°F)	−24.5 (−12.1)	−21.2 (−6.2)	−13.0 (8.6)	−3.8 (25.2)	1.7 (35.1)	7.4 (45.3)	10.5 (50.9)	8.2 (46.8)	1.7 (35.1)	−5.7 (21.7)	−14.3 (6.3)	−21.3 (−6.3)	−6.2 (20.9)
Record low °C (°F)	−44 (−47)	−41.4 (−42.5)	−32.2 (−26.0)	−24.1 (−11.4)	−14.6 (5.7)	−4.4 (24.1)	−0.5 (31.1)	−3.7 (25.3)	−17.0 (1.4)	−25.5 (−13.9)	−36.7 (−34.1)	−41.5 (−42.7)	−44 (−47)
Average precipitation mm (inches)	1.7 (0.07)	1.6 (0.06)	2.0 (0.08)	8.3 (0.33)	17.9 (0.70)	49.5 (1.95)	73.2 (2.88)	72.2 (2.84)	20.9 (0.82)	7.4 (0.29)	2.4 (0.09)	1.9 (0.07)	259 (10.18)
Average precipitation days	0.8	0.5	0.7	2.1	4.2	8.2	10.8	10.3	4.1	1.7	0.9	0.6	44.9
Source 1: NOAA
Source 2: Starlings Roost Weather

== Administrative divisions ==
The district is divided into six bags, which are:

- Alag-Uul
- Erdene-Uul
- Ider-Ulaan
- Khan-Undur
- Teel
- Ulziit

== Tourist attractions ==
- Tsagaan Buurug Lake
