= Tsetserleg (city) =

Provincial capital of Arkhangai Province, Mongolia

Tsetserleg Цэцэрлэг ᠴᠡᠴᠡᠷᠯᠢᠭ
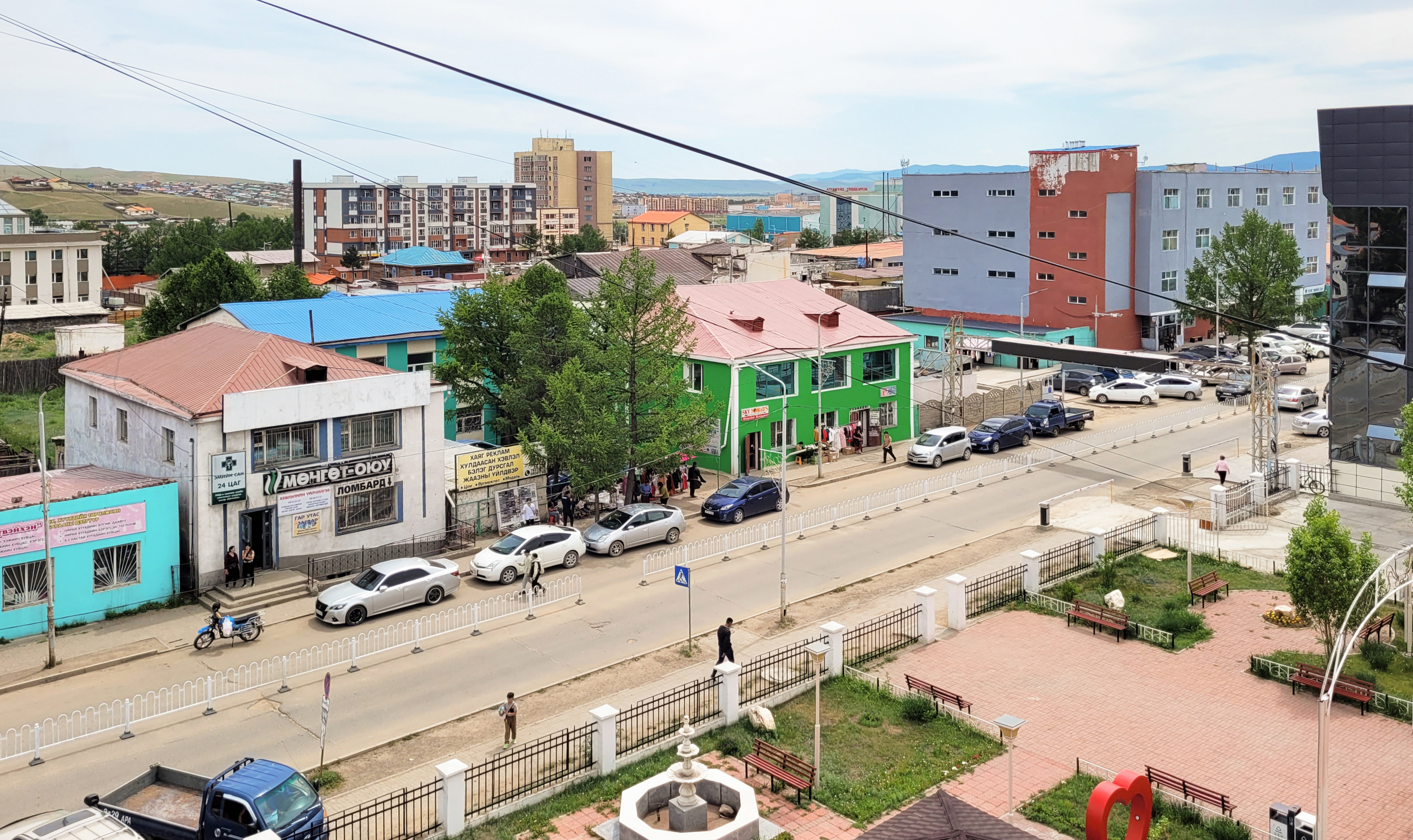

- Location within Mongolia
- Coordinates: 47°28′37″N 101°27′01″E
- Country: Mongolia
- Province: Arkhangai Province
- Founded: ~1631

Area
  - Total: 536 km^{2} (207 sq mi)
- Elevation: 1,691 m (5,548 ft)

Population (2017)
  - Total: 21,620
  - Density: 40.3/km^{2} (104/sq mi)
- Time zone: UTC+8 (UTC + 8)
- Area code: +976 (0)133
- Vehicle registration: АР_ ( _ variable)
- Website: http://erdenebulgan.ar.gov.mn/

Tsetserleg (/ˈtsɛtsərlɛɡ/; Mongolian: Цэцэрлэг [t͡sʰít͡sʰɘrɮɘk] – lit. 'Garden') is the capital of Arkhangai Aimag (province) in Mongolia. It lies on the northeastern slopes of the Khangai Mountains, 600 kilometres (370 miles) southwest of Ulaanbaatar. It has a population of 16,553 (2000 census, with Erdenebulgan sum rural territories population was 18,519), 16,618 (2003 est.), 16,300 (2006 est.).

Tsetserleg is geographically located in the Bulgan sum in the south of the aimag. It is not to be confused with Tsetserleg sum in the north. In 1992 Tsetserleg was designated as Erdenebulgan sum, which has an area of 536 km^{2} (207 sq mi).

== History ==
Tsetserleg is an ancient cultural and commercial centre. It was once the seat of a monastery (Zayiin Gegeen Monastery), built by the First Khalkh Zaya Pandita, Luvsanperenlei (1642–1715) (who should not be confused with Zaya Pandita Namkhaijantsan (1599–1662)). It consisted of the main Guden Süm, the Right, or Summer Semchin Temple, and the Left, or Winter Semchin Temple, all built in the early 1680s. The sixth Zaya Pandita, Jambatseren, was killed by the Communists in 1932, and the main Guden temple was turned into a museum. There is a seventh Zaya Pandita, but he mostly lives in Ulan Bator and visits only occasionally.

== Facilities ==
Tsetserleg has an airport, with regular connections from and to Ulan Bator, a theatre, hotel, hospital, and an agricultural college. The main industry is food processing.

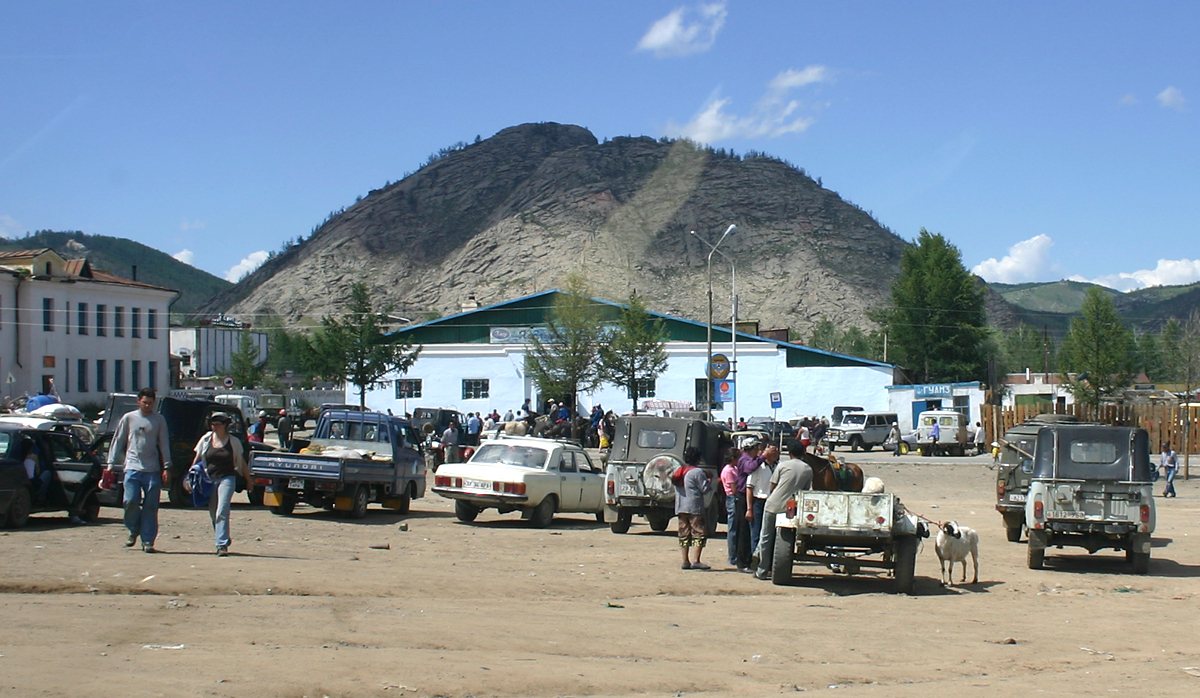
Market in Tsetserleg

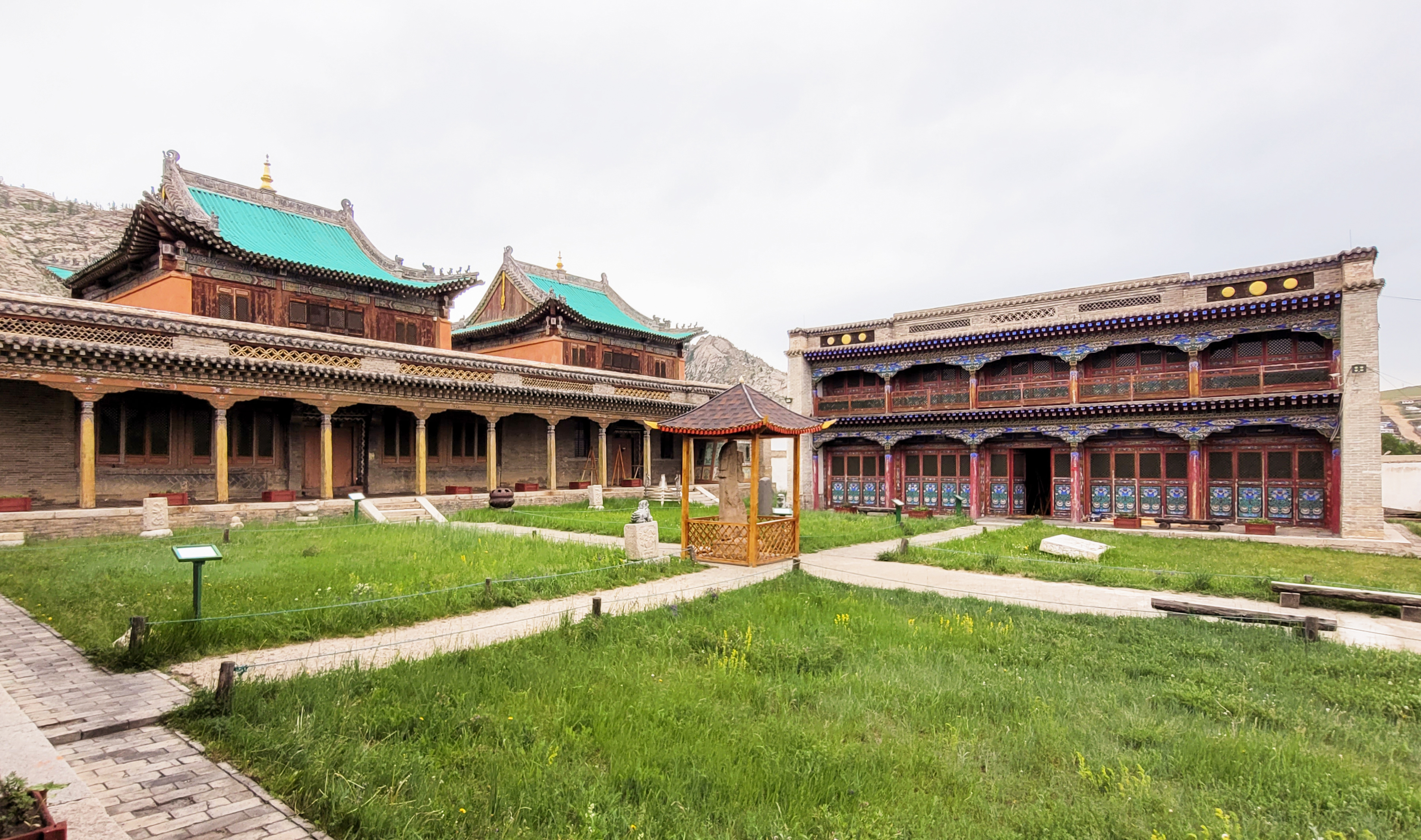
Zayiin Gegeen Monastery

== Climate ==
Tsetserleg has a dry-winter subarctic climate (Köppen Dwc, Trewartha Eclc) bordering extremely closely on a dry-winter humid continental climate (Köppen Dwb). It is part of a microclimate which experiences cooler summers and warmer winters than the rest of Mongolia. Wind speed is also relatively calm on average. In the coldest month of winter, January, it is often the warmest place in the country and temperatures rarely plummet below -30 °C, often hovering at around -15 °C to -25 °C during nighttime and 5 °C to -15 °C during daytime. In January 2014 and 2015 the coldest temperature was -26 °C (each during a short cold snap) while average minimum temperature was -16 °C which was 12 degrees warmer than the Ulaanbaatar average minimum of -28.5 °C (January 2014 and 2015) and identical to the Hohhot average minimum of -16 °C (January 2014 and 2015). The average maximum temperature in January 2015 was 0 °C or the same as Hohhot while overall average January temperature was -9 °C again the same as Hohhot. The warmest temperature of the 10 days above 0 °C in January 2015 was 7 °C which was warmer than Hohhot in which the warmest of the 8 days above 0 °C in January 2015 was 6 °C. Dalanzadgad and Arvaikheer, two other 'mild' cities of Mongolia, experienced identical temperatures although average minimum was marginally warmer at -15 °C each while Dalanzadgad's warmest January day was marginally warmer at 8 °C. Tsetserleg belongs to USDA Plant Hardiness Zone 5.

Climate data for Tsetserleg, elevation 1,691 m (5,548 ft), (1991–2020 normals, extremes 1937–present)
Month	Jan	Feb	Mar	Apr	May	Jun	Jul	Aug	Sep	Oct	Nov	Dec	Year
Record high °C (°F)	9.5 (49.1)	12.5 (54.5)	18.2 (64.8)	28.4 (83.1)	29.9 (85.8)	33.3 (91.9)	35.2 (95.4)	34.0 (93.2)	29.8 (85.6)	23.9 (75.0)	16.0 (60.8)	11.1 (52.0)	35.2 (95.4)
Mean daily maximum °C (°F)	−8.3 (17.1)	−4.9 (23.2)	2.3 (36.1)	10.8 (51.4)	17.0 (62.6)	21.4 (70.5)	23.3 (73.9)	21.4 (70.5)	16.5 (61.7)	8.8 (47.8)	−0.7 (30.7)	−6.4 (20.5)	8.4 (47.2)
Daily mean °C (°F)	−15.1 (4.8)	−12.0 (10.4)	−4.8 (23.4)	3.7 (38.7)	9.7 (49.5)	14.6 (58.3)	16.6 (61.9)	14.4 (57.9)	9.0 (48.2)	1.3 (34.3)	−7.7 (18.1)	−12.7 (9.1)	1.4 (34.6)
Mean daily minimum °C (°F)	−20.7 (−5.3)	−17.8 (0.0)	−11.0 (12.2)	−2.7 (27.1)	2.8 (37.0)	7.9 (46.2)	10.8 (51.4)	8.6 (47.5)	2.6 (36.7)	−4.8 (23.4)	−12.7 (9.1)	−17.8 (0.0)	−4.6 (23.8)
Record low °C (°F)	−36.9 (−34.4)	−33.9 (−29.0)	−31 (−24)	−21.1 (−6.0)	−12.0 (10.4)	−4.0 (24.8)	−4.0 (24.8)	−2.2 (28.0)	−9.6 (14.7)	−22.6 (−8.7)	−28.9 (−20.0)	−35 (−31)	−36.9 (−34.4)
Average precipitation mm (inches)	2.9 (0.11)	3.4 (0.13)	8.2 (0.32)	14.6 (0.57)	35.2 (1.39)	55.1 (2.17)	87.5 (3.44)	73.3 (2.89)	26.8 (1.06)	13.2 (0.52)	6.4 (0.25)	3.2 (0.13)	329.9 (12.99)
Average precipitation days (≥ 1.0 mm)	1.8	1.6	2.9	4.0	5.5	9.0	12.1	10.5	5.4	3.0	2.2	1.7	59.4
Average relative humidity (%)	55.5	55.2	47.7	43.6	45.7	54.7	63.5	63.6	54.7	51.8	53.7	54.2	53.4
Mean monthly sunshine hours	185.7	197.2	250.2	245.6	279.6	275.4	265.2	260.5	254.0	232.5	186.6	172.6	2,805.1
Source 1: NOAA (sun, 1961–1990) Starlings Roost Weather
Source 2: Meteo Climat (record highs and lows)

== Notable natives ==
- Bat-Erdeniin Batbayar, historian
- Radnaasümbereliin Gonchigdorj
- Gelegjamtsiin Ösökhbayar, wrestler
- Maidarjaviin Ganzorig, cosmonaut and scientist
- Khürelbaataryn Bulgantuya, acting chairperson of State Great Khural

== Tourist attractions ==
- Museum of Arkhangai Province

== Sister cities ==
City	State / Region	Country	Year	Sources
Bellingham	Washington	United States	2011	
