= Tsetserleg, Arkhangai =

District in Arkhangai Province, Mongolia

Coordinates: 48°52′56″N 101°14′30″E

Tsetserleg District Цэцэрлэг сум ᠴᠡᠴᠡᠷᠯᠢᠭᠰᠤᠮᠤ
- District
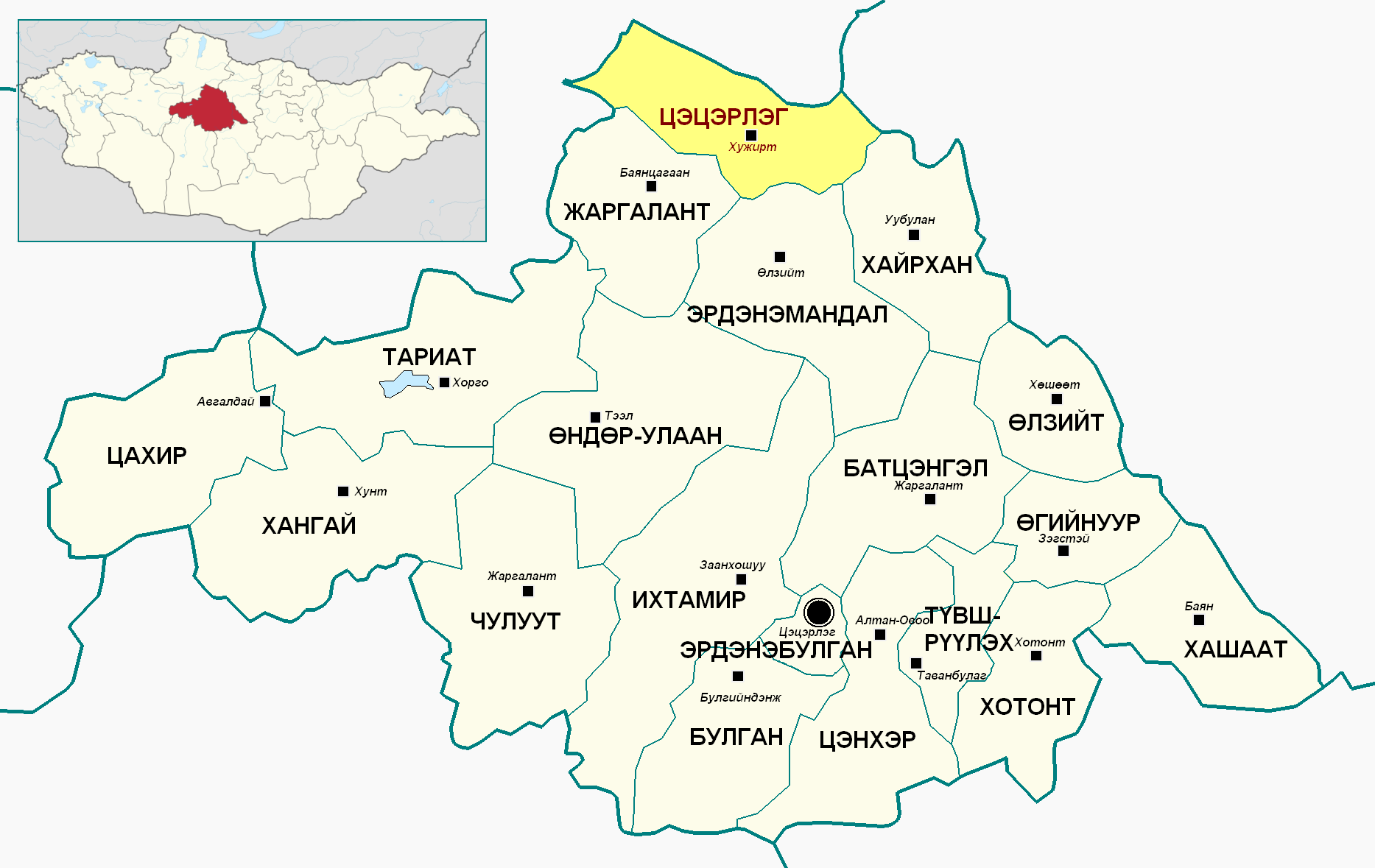
- Tsetserleg District in Arkhangai Province
- Country: Mongolia
- Province: Arkhangai Province

Area
  - Total: 2,500 km^{2} (970 sq mi)
- Time zone: UTC+8 (UTC + 8)

Tsetserleg (Mongolian: Цэцэрлэг сум; "Garden District") is a sum (district) of Arkhangai Province in central Mongolia. In 2009, its population was 3,813.

The sum is located in the northern most part of the aimag, both geographically and administratively separate from the aimag capital Tsetserleg.

== Administrative divisions ==
The district is divided into five bags, which are:

- Chuluut
- Ikh Bulag
- Khongorj
- Khujirt
- Tuulant

== Notable natives ==
- Baabar, politician
