= Battsengel =

District in Arkhangai Province, Mongolia

Coordinates: 47°47′32″N 101°58′26″E

Battsengel District Батцэнгэл сум ᠪᠠᠲᠤᠴᠡᠩᠭᠡᠯᠰᠤᠮᠤ
- Sum
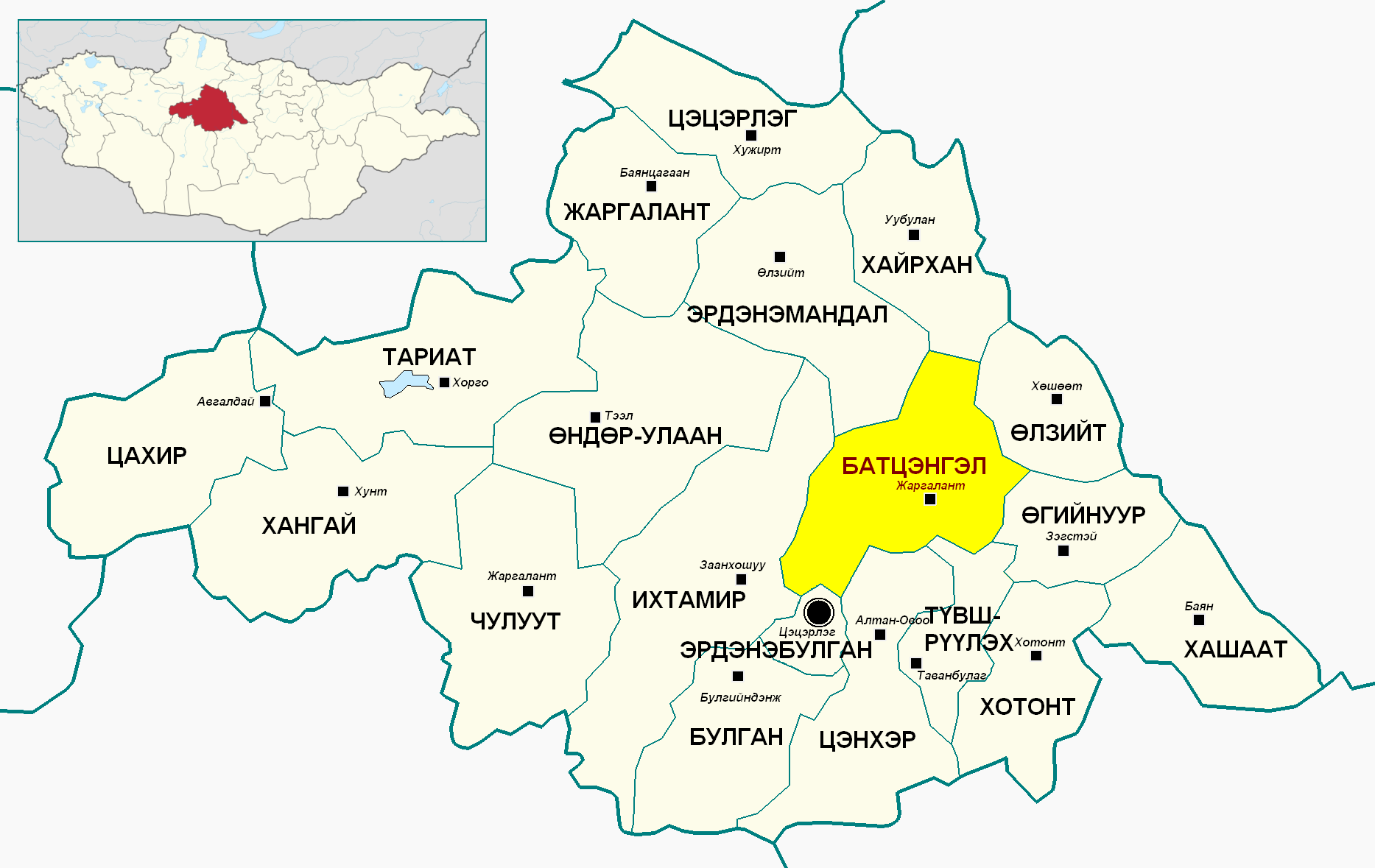
- Battsengel Sum in Arkhangai Province, Mongolia
- Country: Mongolia
- Province: Arkhangai Province

Area
  - Total: 3,500 km^{2} (1,400 sq mi)

Population (2010)
  - Total: 3,289
  - Density: 1.06/km^{2} (2.7/sq mi)
- Time zone: UTC+8 (UTC + 8)
- Website: http://battsengel.ar.gov.mn/

Battsengel (Mongolian: Батцэнгэл [pátʰt͡sʰɪŋg̊ɪɬ]) is a sum (district) of Arkhangai Province in central Mongolia. Battsengel is home to approximately 3,289 inhabitants.

== History ==
In 1696, when the Qing army, with the participation of Khalkh princes, defeated the army of Galdan Boshgot Khan of Oirad, Namjil, the son of Toba Taiji, a nobleman of Tumenhen, earned the title of Taiji. The governor presented the award. Later, Tumenhen, in recognition of the good efforts of Oirat fighting on behalf of Mr. Manji of Sain noyon's lineage, cut off 19 counties from the territory of the khan province and established the province of Khalkh in 1725.

== Administrative divisions ==
The district is divided into six bags, which are:

- Bayan-Uul
- Dairbor
- Del
- Khunug
- Tsats
- Ulaanchuluu
