= Bulgan, Arkhangai =

District in Arkhangai Province, Mongolia

Coordinates: 47°19′07″N 101°06′53″E

Bulgan District Булган сум ᠪᠤᠯᠠᠭᠠᠨᠰᠤᠮᠤ
- Sum
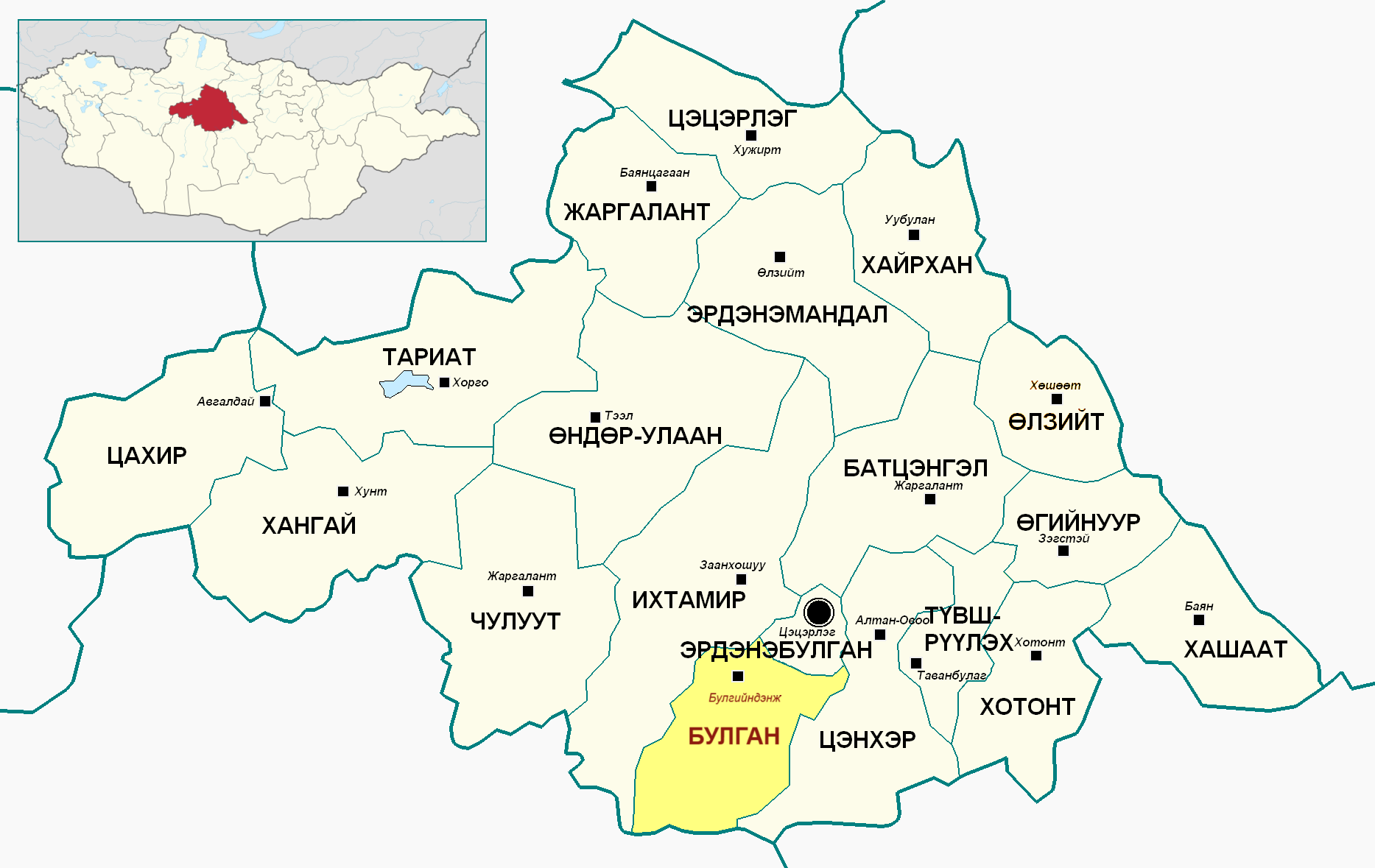
- Bulgan District in Arkhangai Province
- Country: Mongolia
- Province: Arkhangai Province

Area
  - Total: 3,100 km^{2} (1,200 sq mi)
- Time zone: UTC+8 (UTC + 8)

Bulgan (Mongolian: Булган [pʊ́ɬɢ̊əɴ]) is a district of Arkhangai Province in central Mongolia. As of the 2009 census, its population was 2,434.

== Administrative divisions ==
The district is divided into four bags, which are:

- Bayanbulag
- Tamir
- Tusgalt
- Zuunmod
