= Ögii Lake =

Lake in Ögii nuur, Arkhangai, Mongolia

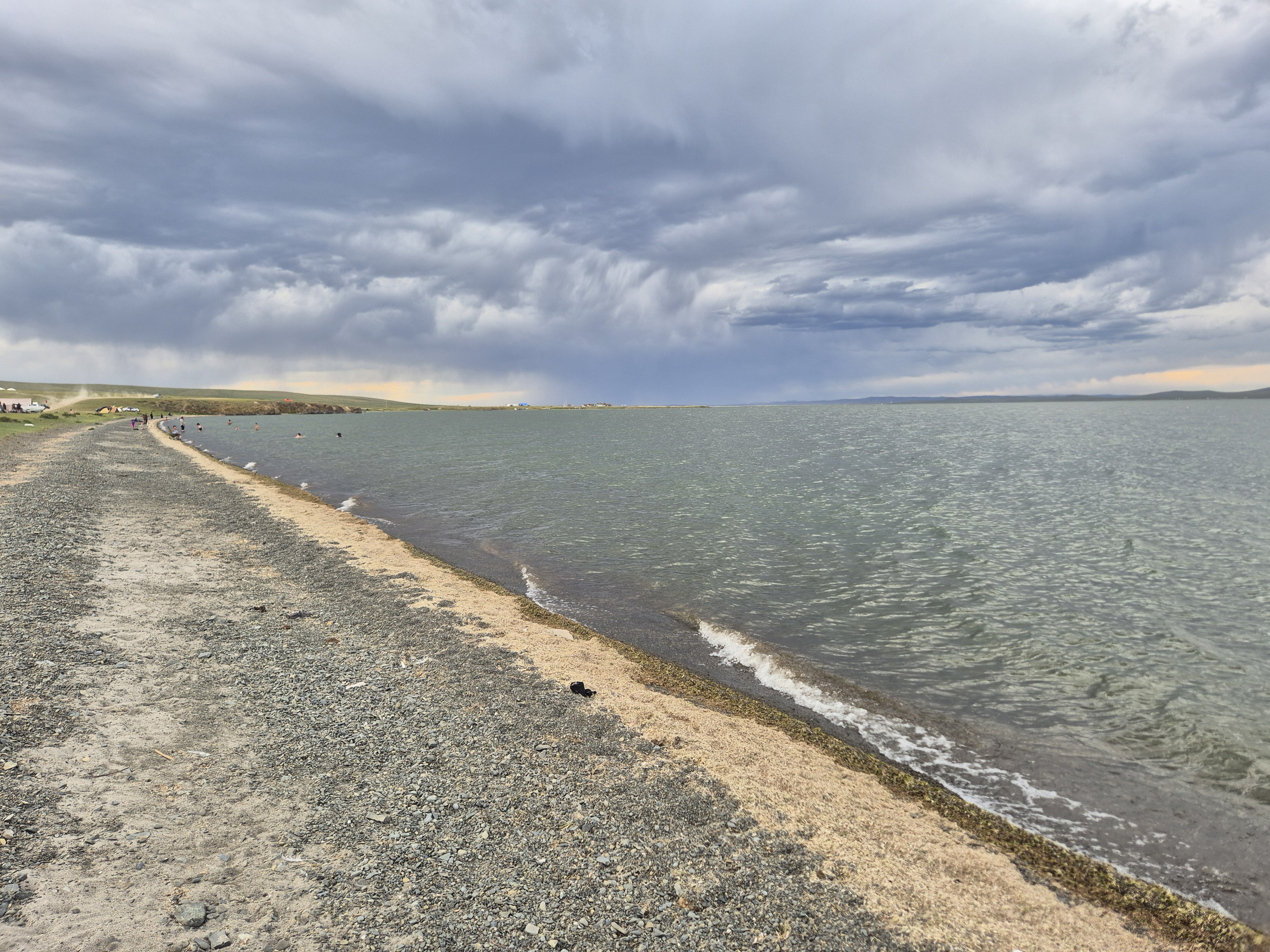
- Ögii Lake side in 2025

- Location within Mongolia
- Location: Ögii nuur, Arkhangai
- Coordinates: 47°46′15″N 102°46′00″E
- Basin countries: Mongolia
- Max. length: 7.9 km (4.9 mi)
- Max. width: 5.3 km (3.3 mi)
- Surface area: 25.7 km^{2} (9.9 sq mi)
- Average depth: 6.6 m (22 ft)
- Max. depth: 15.3 m (50 ft)
- Water volume: 0.17 km^{3} (140,000 acre⋅ft)
- Surface elevation: 1,337 m (4,386 ft)

Ramsar Wetland
- Official name: Ogii Nuur
- Designated: 6 July 1998
- Reference no.: 955

Ögii Lake (Mongolian: Өгий нуур IPA: [ɵɡ̊íː nʊːɾ]) is a freshwater lake in Ögii nuur, Arkhangai Province, Mongolia. The lake, designated as a Ramsar Site of International Importance, is known for its fish and for birdlife. It is a stopover point for migrating waterbirds of the family Anatidae and has been designated an Important Bird Area by BirdLife International.

A study was conducted in 2005 and 2006 at the lake and its surrounding to know the total amount of habitat. Since 2006, the lake has been designated as a protected area. Almost half the lake is less than 3 meters (10 ft) deep with a maximum depth of 15.3 meters. The lake has a total shoreline length of 24.7 km and a total water volume of 171 million m^{3}. There are several ger tourist camps around the lake, as well an information and training center.

== See also ==
- Ramsar sites in Mongolia
