= Tsenkher =

District in Arkhangai Province, Mongolia

Coordinates: 47°26′43″N 101°45′01″E

Tsenkher District Цэнхэр сум ᠴᠡᠩᠬᠡᠷᠰᠤᠮᠤ
- District
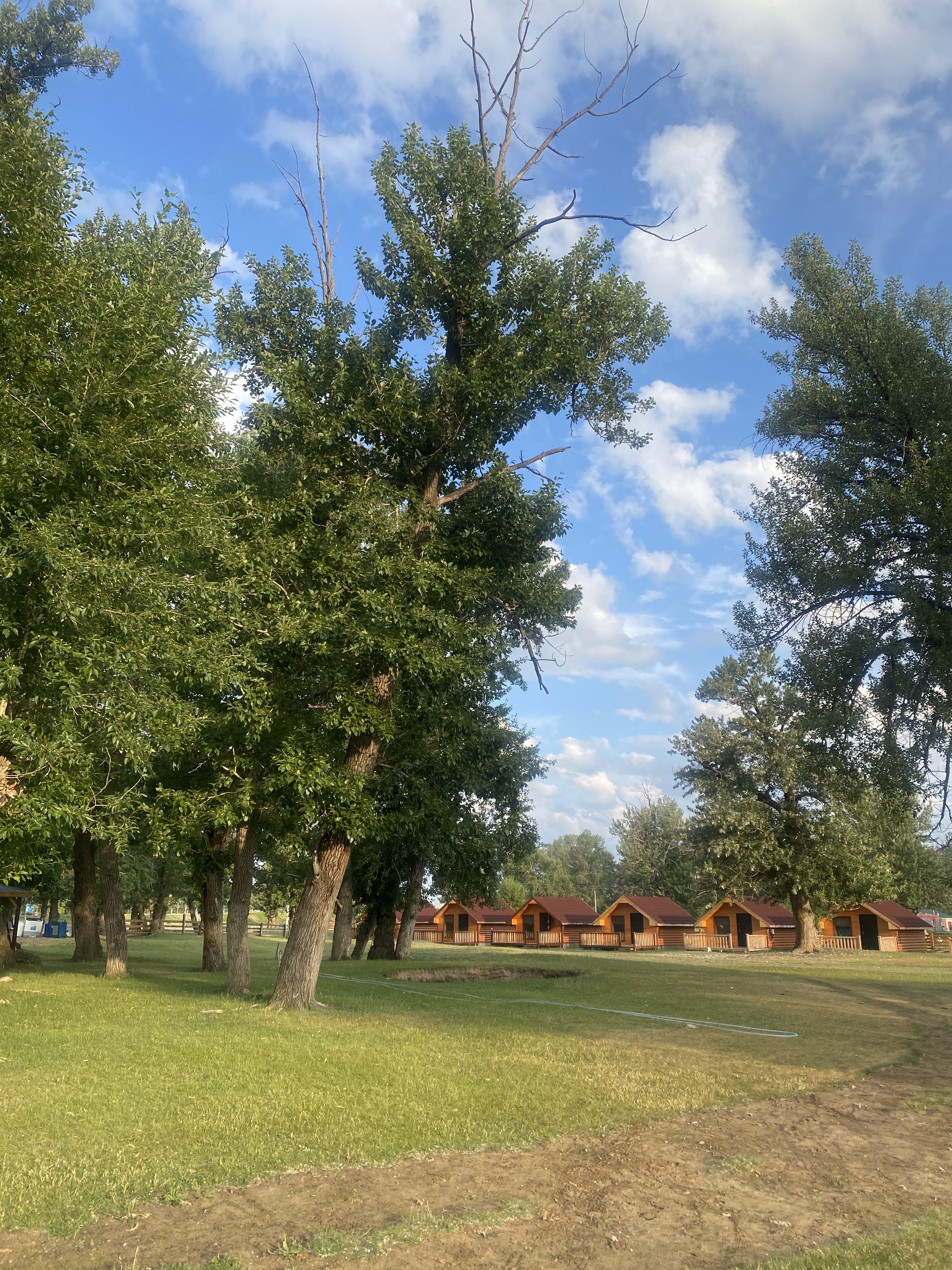

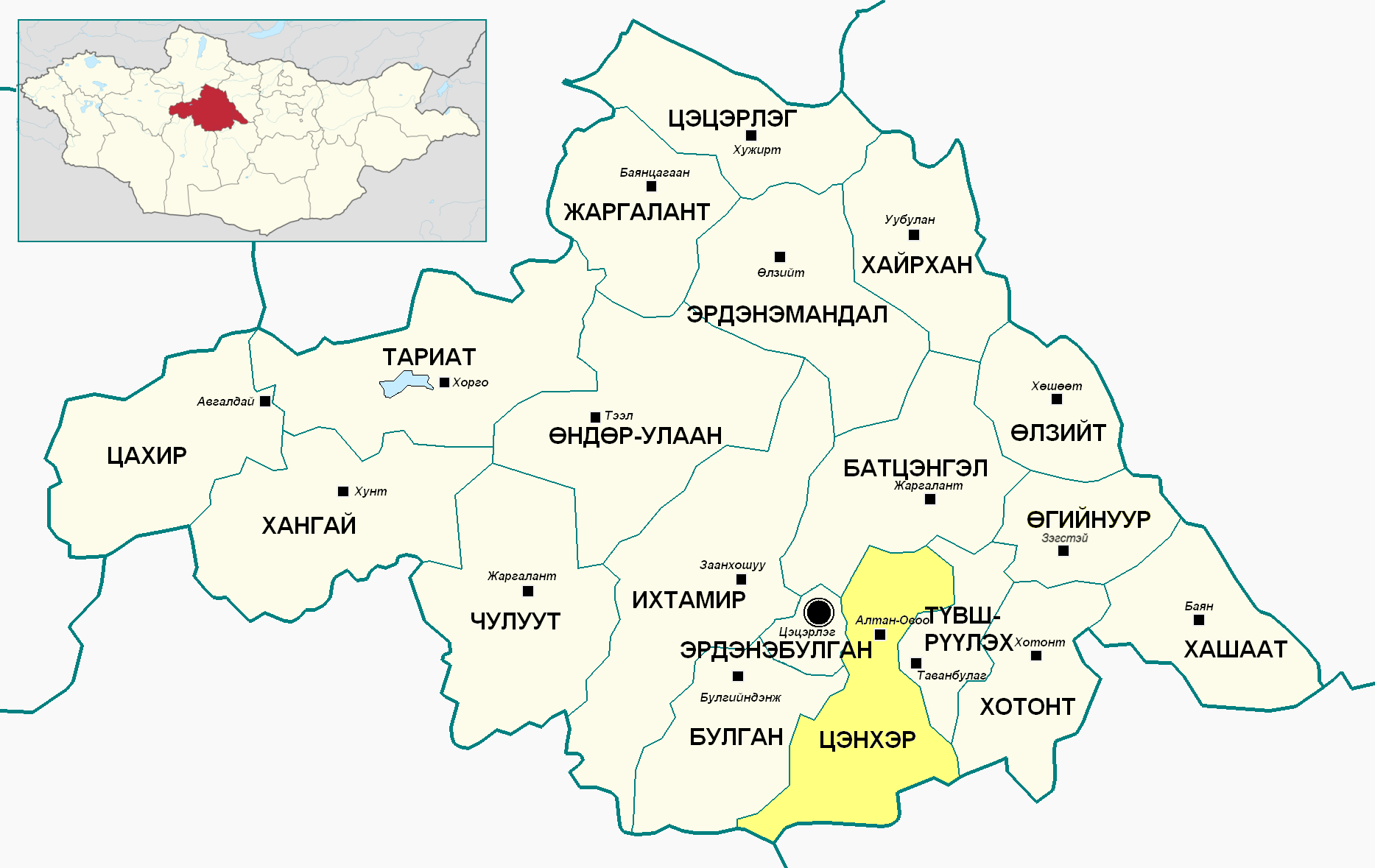
- Tsenkher District in Arkhangai Province
- Country: Mongolia
- Province: Arkhangai Province

Area
  - Total: 3,200 km^{2} (1,200 sq mi)
- Time zone: UTC+8 (UTC + 8)

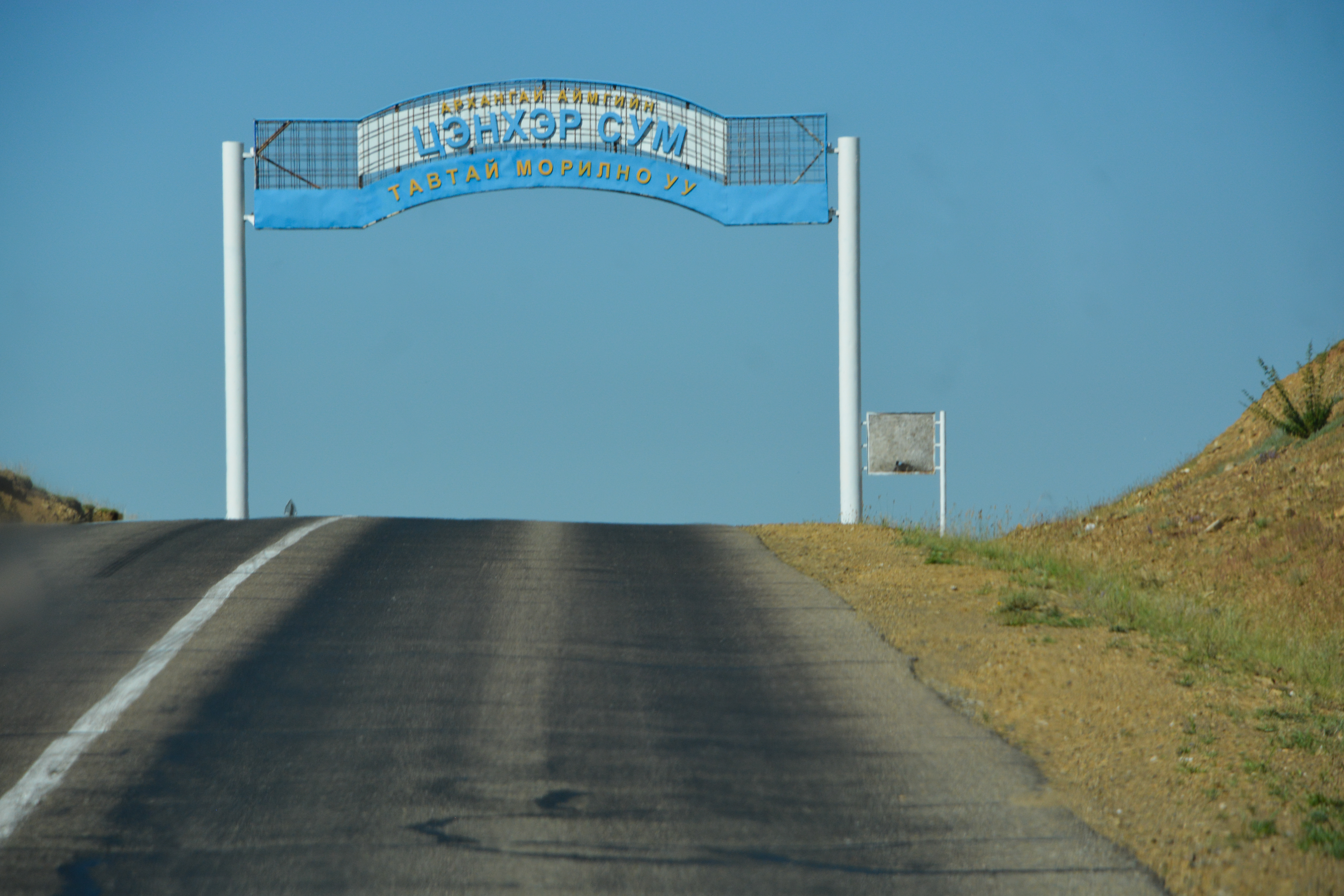
A gate at the boundary of the sum..

Tsenkher District (from Mongolian цэнхэр [t͡sʰíŋxɪr] 'light blue') is a district of Arkhangai, Mongolia. As of the 2009 census, it had a population of 5,414.

== Administrative divisions ==
The district is divided into six bags, which are:

- Altan-Ovoo
- Builan
- Orkhon
- Tamir
- Tsenkher
- Tsetserleg
