= Geology of Mongolia =

The geology of Mongolia is made up a complicated array of microcontinents and island chains accreted together over the past half billion years, producing varied terrain and tectonics.

== Tectonics ==
Mongolia has complicated tectonic and structural geology, belonging to the Mongolian-Okhotsk Mobile Zone, between the Siberian Platform and Chinese Platform. The basement rocks formed during the Paleozoic in the Precambrian as Riphean age ophiolite formations experienced rifting from 1.7 to 1.6 billion years ago and again around 800 million years ago. The closing of a late Proterozoic ocean generated the ophiolites and the oldest basement rock. The Baikalides and Altaid mountain belts represent the accretion of island arcs into the Paleozoic. The collision of small microcontinents like Amuria and the large collision between Asia and Gondwana in the Mesozoic and Cenozoic had a major impact on the region. Crustal extension created the Mongolian Plateau, while rifting, crustal thinning, block faulting and basalt eruptions produced terrain very similar to the Basin and Range province in the western United States.

== History of geological research ==
Alexander von Humboldt and N.M. Prewalskii made the first geological reconnaissance of Mongolia. Russian geologists were active prior and after World War I, into the Soviet period, conducting expeditions into the Gobi Desert. The Russian Geological Exploration Expeditions from 1932 to 1937 discovered molybdenum, tungsten, tin, oil, iron, coal, evaporites and fluorite, followed by the activities of the Polish-Mongolian Paleontological Expedition from 1946 to 1949. Mongolneft, a state owned oil company launched in 1948. The Geological Prospecting Survey (renamed Ministry of Geology in 1961) was created in 1957.

== Natural resource geology ==
Tectonic belts in Mongolia have a strong influence on where base metal ores have formed. The North Mongolian Metallogenic Province is part of the Mongolian Altai Caledonides, with a southern boundary at a deep fault near Bulgan. The East Mongolian Metallogenic Province covers two-thirds of the country and was highly influenced by Mesozoic magmatic activity. The South Mongolian Metallogenic Province is a third grouping.

Iron ore forms as metasomatic skarn deposits and together with manganese ore is common in the East Mongolian province. Hercynian and Caledonian ophiolite structures seem to control for chromium, titanium and vanadium. Lead, zinc, copper and gold mineralization across all three metallogenic provinces. The Boro ore zone traces the Changajn and Chentejn mountains in the East Mongolian province with gold deposits. Triassic and Jurassic igneous deposits hold many of the country's metal resources in the same province. Deep-seated faults host mercury deposits. Northwest of Muren, aluminum deposits are associated with nepheline syenite and sillimanite gneiss. Ophiolite belts often host secondary nickel and cobalt-nickel ores together with chrysotile asbestos. The Bulgan fault zone mylonite hosts azurite, malachite, chrysocolla and turquoise.

The Valley of Lakes is the center of Mongolia's extensive coal deposits, which date to the Carboniferous in the west and the Permian in the south. Oil is known from intracratonic basins in the southeast, centered around the Sajnsand oil field.
