= Arkhangai Province =

Province of Mongolia

Arkhangai Province Архангай аймаг (Mongolian) ᠠᠷᠤᠬᠠᠩᠭ᠋ᠠᠢ ᠠᠢᠮᠠᠭ
- Province
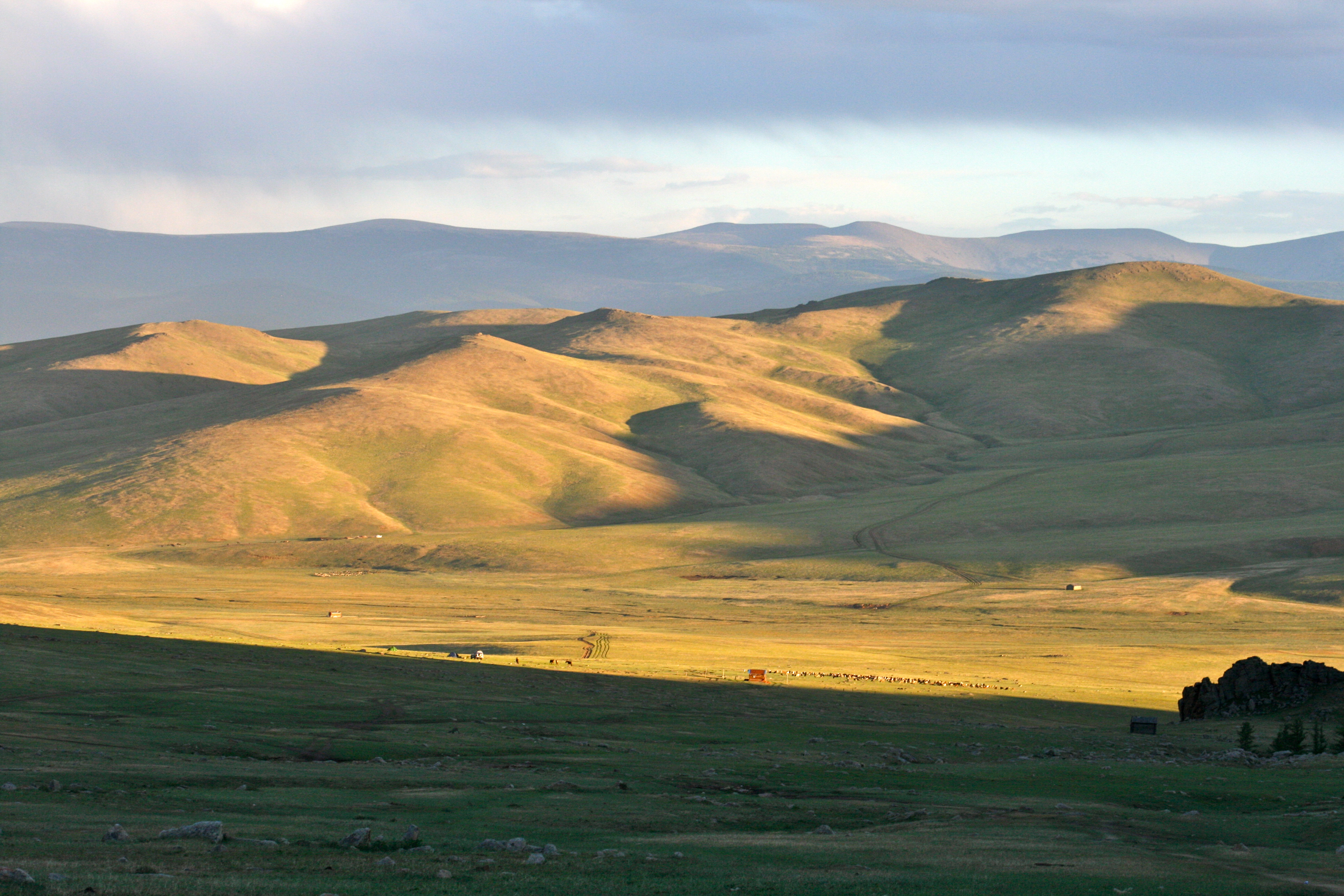
- Arkhangai in 2013

- Flag Coat of arms

- Coordinates: 47°23′N 101°30′E
- Country: Mongolia
- Established: 1931
- Capital: Tsetserleg

Area
  - Total: 55,313.82 km^{2} (21,356.79 sq mi)
- Elevation (average): 2,414 m (7,920 ft)

Population (2025)
  - Total: 91,138
  - Density: 1.6477/km^{2} (4.2674/sq mi)

GDP
  - Total: ▲MNT 1.134 trillion US$ 316.6 million (2025)
  - Per capita: ▲MNT 12,301,700; US$ 3,433 (2025)
- Time zone: UTC+8
- Area code: +976 133
- ISO 3166 code: MN-073
- Vehicle registration: АР_
- Website: arkhangai.gov.mn

Arkhangai Province (Mongolian: Архангай аймаг) is one of the 21 provinces of Mongolia, located slightly west of the country's center, on the northern slopes of the Khangai Mountains. It is composed of 19 districts.

== History ==
The province was founded in 1931.

== Administrative subdivisions ==
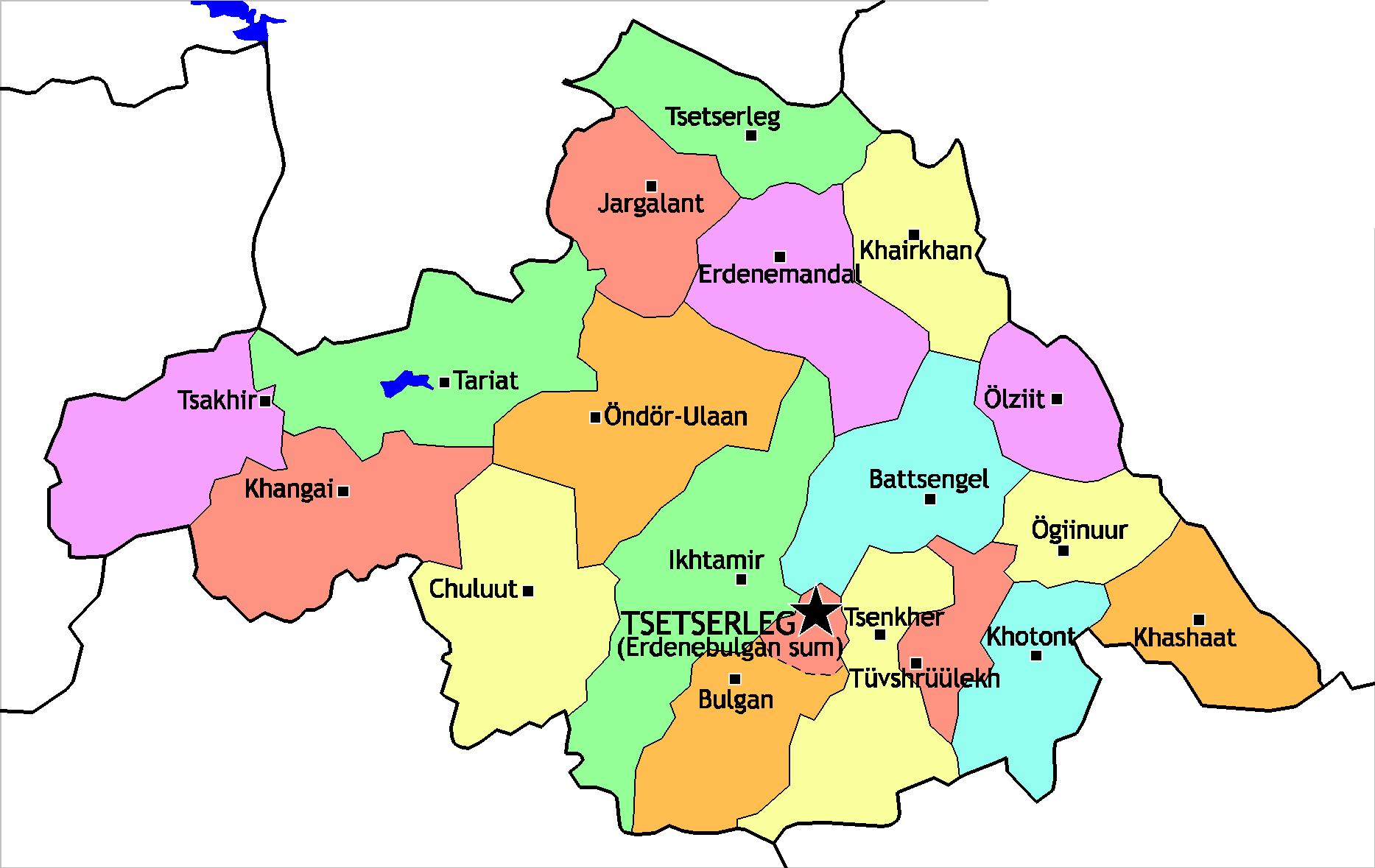
Sums of Arkhangai

Arkhangai province has 19 sums and 101 bags. The aimag capital Tsetserleg is geographically located in the Erdenebulgan sum in the south of the aimag. It is not to be confused with the Tsetserleg sum in the north.

The Sums of Arkhangai aimag
| Sum | Mongolian | Population (2005) | Population (2008) | Population (2009) | Area km^{2} | Density /km^{2} | Sum centre population |
|---|---|---|---|---|---|---|---|
| Battsengel | Батцэнгэл | 3,818 | 3,855 | 3,846 | 3,500 | 1.10 | 1,096 |
| Bulgan | Булган | 2,285 | 2,361 | 2,434 | 3,100 | 0.79 | 961 |
| Chuluut | Чулуут | 3,943 | 3,749 | 3,744 | 3,900 | 0.96 | 935 |
| Erdenebulgan* | Эрдэнэбулган | 17,790 | 18,022 | 17,770 | 536 | 33.15 | 17,770 |
| Erdenemandal | Эрдэнэмандал | 6,099 | 5,843 | 5,933 | 3,400 | 1.74 | 1,091 |
| Ikh-Tamir | Их тамир | 5,714 | 5,154 | 5,247 | 4,800 | 1.09 | 1,050 |
| Jargalant | Жаргалант | 4,089 | 4,114 | 4,111 | 3,832 | 1.07 | 1,035 |
| Khairkhan | Хайрхан | 3,756 | 3,558 | 3,656 | 2,500 | 1.46 | 739 |
| Khangai | Хангай | 3,054 | 2,805 | 2,926 | 4,400 | 0.66 | 795 |
| Khashaat | Хашаат | 3,594 | 3,305 | 3,344 | 2,600 | 1.29 | 802 |
| Khotont | Хотонт | 4,763 | 4,809 | 4,440 | 2,200 | 2.02 | 774 |
| Ögii nuur | Өгий нуур | 3,015 | 3,041 | 3,086 | n.a | n.a. | 622 |
| Ölziit | Өлзийт | 3,154 | 3,037 | 3,102 | 1,700 | 1.82 | 829 |
| Öndör-Ulaan | Өндөр-Улаан | 5,873 | 5,729 | 5,798 | 4,000 | 1.45 | 1,097 |
| Tariat | Тариат | 5,082 | 5,022 | 5,086 | 3,800 | 1.34 | 644 |
| Tüvshrüülekh | Түвшрүүлэх | 3,489 | 3,410 | 3,438 | 1,200 | 2.86 | 1,869 |
| Tsakhir | Цахир | 2,058 | 2,126 | 2,143 | 3,398 | 0.63 | 438 |
| Tsenkher | Цэнхэр | 5,480 | 5,387 | 5,414 | 3,200 | 1.69 | 997 |
| Tsetserleg | Цэцэрлэг | 2,058 | 3,955 | 3,813 | 2,500 | 1.53 | 848 |

^{*} - The aimag capital Tsetserleg

== Climate ==
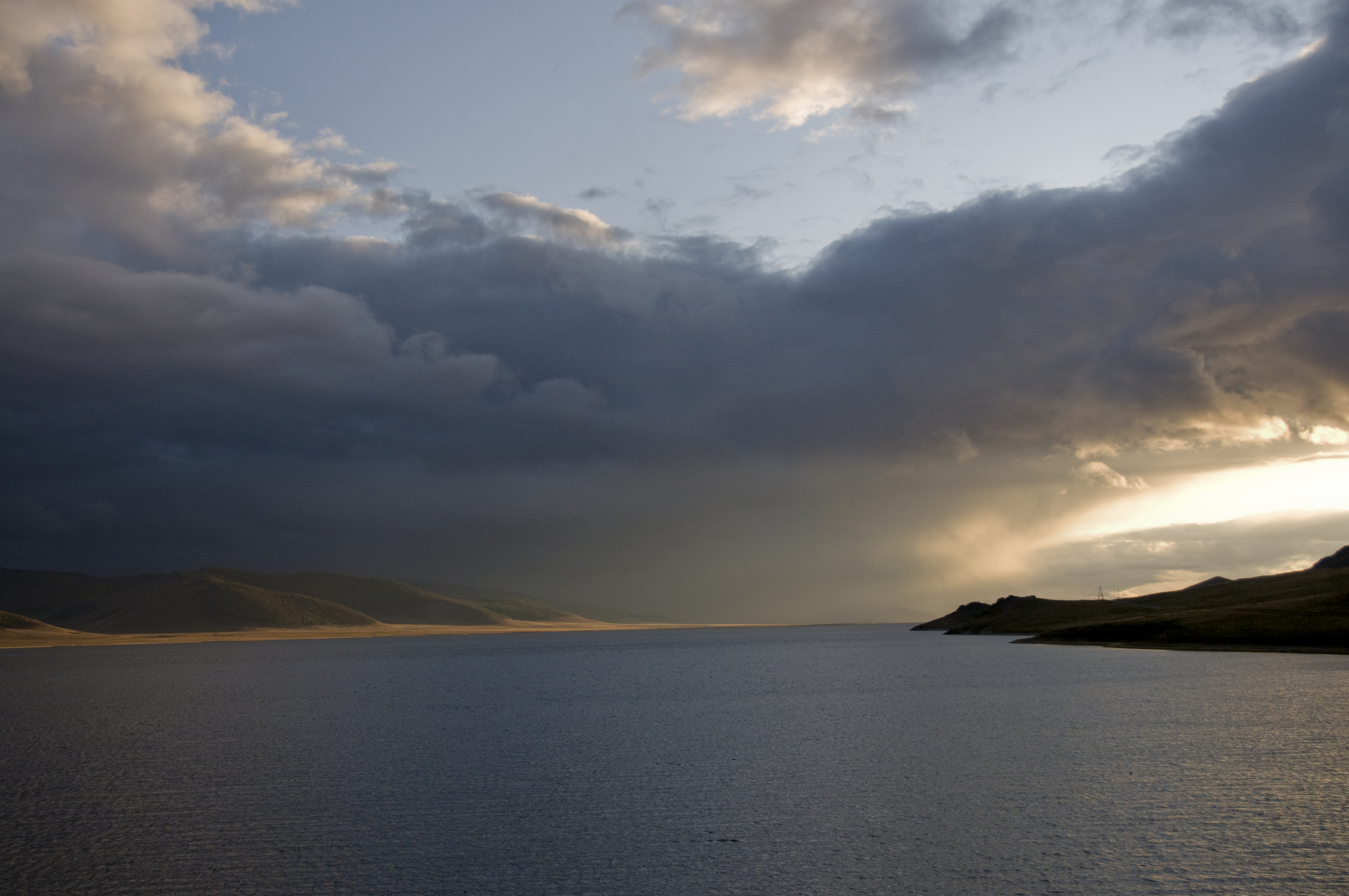
Terkhiin Tsagaan Lake, Mongolia

In winter, the mean temperature is −30 to −38 °C (−22 to −36 °F), and in summer, the highest temperature is between 25 and 36 °C (77 and 97 °F).

== Geology ==
The province has a total forest area of 10,086 km^{2}, which represents 18.6% of the province's area.

== Economy ==
The main field of economy in the aimag is agriculture, predominantly animal husbandry. According to 2004 data, the aimag was home to 1,948,000 domestic animals: goats, sheep, cattle (incl. yaks and khainags), horses and camels. Camels are almost exclusively herded in the southeastern sums.

In 2018, the province contributed to 1.34% of the total national GDP of Mongolia.
