= Dalanzadgad New Wastewater Treatment Plant =

Wastewater treatment plant in Dalanzadgad, Ömnögovi, Mongolia

- Даланзадгад Хотын Шинэ Цэвэрлэх Байгууламж
- Interactive map of the Dalanzadgad New Wastewater Treatment Plant area

General information
- Type: wastewater treatment plant
- Location: Dalanzadgad, Ömnögovi, Mongolia
- Coordinates: 43°36′50.1″N 104°29′00.7″E
- Groundbreaking: 4 January 2018
- Opened: June 2020
- Cost: US$21.17 million

Technical details
- Grounds: 1.8 hectares

Design and construction
- Main contractor: N A.B, S&A Trade, San and Baiguulamj

The Dalanzadgad New Wastewater Treatment Plant (Mongolian: Даланзадгад Хотын Шинэ Цэвэрлэх Байгууламж) is a wastewater treatment plant in Dalanzadgad, Ömnögovi Province, Mongolia. The plant stands at a total ground area of 1.8 hectares, and has a water processing capacity of 3,000 m^{2} per day.

== History ==
Due to the overcapacity of the existing old treatment plant, a new treatment plant should be constructed. The groundbreaking ceremony for the construction of the new plant was held on 4 January 2018 at the Ministry of Construction and Urban Development. The construction was completed in 2019 by N A.B, S&A Trade, San and Baiguulamj companies. Test run of the plant was carried out in the first half of 2020. In June 2020 the plant went into full operation.

== Finance ==
The plant was constructed with a cost of US$21.17 million. About 92% of the funding was provided by a loan from Asian Development Bank and the remaining 8% was provided by the Government of Mongolia.

== See also ==
- Environmental issues in Mongolia
