= Tost Tosonbumba Nature Reserve =

Nature reserve in Ömnögovi, Mongolia

Coordinates: 43°7′29″N 100°27′31″E

- Interactive map of Tost Tosonbumba Nature Reserve
- Location: Ömnögovi, Mongolia
- Area: 7,284 km^{2} (2,812 mi^{2})
- Established: 2016

The Tost Tosonbumba Nature Reserve is a nature reserve in Ömnögovi Province, Mongolia, dedicated to conserving the snow leopard (Panthera uncia).

== History ==
Following an ecological study in the South Gobi Desert, starting in 2009, and the killing of a snow leopard by herders protecting their livestock, the Tost Tosonbumba was established as a local protection area the following year. Bayarjargal Agvaantseren established a livestock insurance programme and led a campaign to persuade the government to establish a reserve. In 2010, Tost Tosonbumba was established as a local protected area and had 37 mining licenses. Under local protection rules, it was possible to revoke licenses and to prevent others from being issued. Mining operations fragment habitats and drive nomadic communities into snow cat territory, resulting in conflict.

One of the conservationists, Lkhagvasumberel Tumursukh, had been actively fighting against mining operations in the area to protect snow leopards and the environment before he was killed in 2015.

Following a campaign for higher protection, in April 2016 the area was declared a nature reserve, and all mining licenses were revoked.

== See also ==
- Bayarjargal Agvaantseren
- Lkhagvasumberel Tumursukh
- Environmental issues in Mongolia
