= Dalanzadgad Wastewater Treatment Plant =

Wastewater treatment plant in Dalanzadgad, Ömnögovi, Mongolia

- Даланзадгад хотын цэвэрлэх байгууламж
- Interactive map of the Dalanzadgad Wastewater Treatment Plant area

General information
- Type: wastewater treatment plant
- Location: Dalanzadgad, Ömnögovi, Mongolia
- Coordinates: 43°35′02.6″N 104°26′46.9″E
- Opened: 1971

The Dalanzadgad Wastewater Treatment Plant (Mongolian: Даланзадгад хотын цэвэрлэх байгууламж) is a wastewater treatment plant in Dalanzadgad, Ömnögovi Province, Mongolia.

== History ==
The plant was constructed in 1971. Over time, the plant has reached its full water treatment and processing capacity. Therefore, later on it was decided that a new treatment plant should be built. The Dalanzadgad New Wastewater Treatment Plant located not far from the existing old plant was constructed in 2019 and opened a year later in 2020.

== Technical specifications ==
The plant has a water processing capacity of 1,100 m^{2} per day.

== See also ==
- Environmental issues in Mongolia
