= Lkhagvasumberel Tumursukh =

Mongolian biologist and environmentalist

Lkhagvasumberel Tumursukh (Mongolian: Төмөрсүхийн Лхагвасүмбэрэл; 1988–2015) was a Mongolian biologist, conservation ranger and environmentalist.

He fought against mining operations around the Tost-Tosonbumbi range to protect the environment and preserve the biodiversity. After multiple external attempts to take his life, T. Lkhagvasümberel mysteriously died in November 2015. Prominent international scientists, journalists, United Nations special rapporteur and activists, along with his father, expressed doubt about the cause of his death and urged the reinvestigation. The domestic and international public gained a general understanding of the need to protect the Tost-Tosonbumba range in Gurvan tes, Ömnögovi as a result of the case of his death.

== Early life ==
Lkhagvasumberel Tumursukh was born on 6 April 1988, in Ikh-Tamir, Arkhangai Province, the eldest son of J. Tumursukh. His father Tumursukh is a ranger and biologist in Ulaan Taiga, Khövsgöl.

Lkhagvasumberel enrolled in an elementary school in Khatgal, Khövsgöl in 1996. He also took first place in the Biology Olympiad held in Khövsgöl Province in 2004, and third place in a wildlife photography competition held in 2009.

In 2010, he graduated National University of Mongolia with a bachelor's degree in zoology.

== Career ==
Lkhagvasumberel Tumursukh joined the Snow Leopard Trust's Mongolia partner, Snow Leopard Conservation Foundation, in 2009 as a student intern in Ömnögovi Province, working on camera trapping for the Long-term Ecological Study (LTES) on snow leopards. He was hired full-time in 2012, becoming the primary Research Associate for the LTES program. His friends, colleagues and family called him Sumbe[e].

=== Conservation activity ===
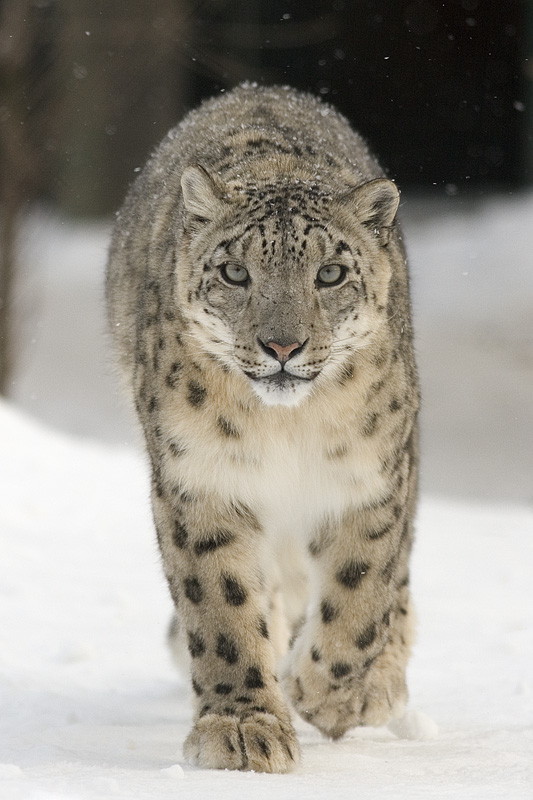
Snow leopard

Herders saw snow leopards as a threat to livestock and retaliated by killing them. Starting in the late 1990s, Mongolian environmentalists and scientists initiated a few projects to preserve the leopards. By 2009, the entire Tost Uul area in Gurvan tes, Ömnögovi had been opened to mining licenses, threatening to destroy the grasslands both livestock and snow leopard prey depended on. In October 2010, the Mineral Resources Authority approved a locally Protected Area status for Tost — the lowest protection tier. Mining companies got around this by reselling expiring licenses to each other. Therefore, Snow Leopard Conservation Foundation pushed for the stronger State Nature Reserve designation.

Lkhagvasumberel Tumursukh once carried hundreds of pounds of ice up a mountain by hand to give animals water during a freeze.

He also paid great attention to providing environmental education to local residents, and to reduce conflict between herders and snow leopards, he initiated a project — funded by international sources — to introduce predator-proof corrals to protect livestock from the predators. He also participated in an episode on snow leopards for the environmental and educational television series "Khureelen" ("The Ecosystem"), presenting his research work. He was featured in a Discovery Channel documentary.

=== Research works ===
While working, Lkhagvasumberel enrolled in a master's program at the National University of Mongolia. As part of his research, he conducted Mongolia's first double-observer count surveys of Mongolian ibex, the primary prey of the snow leopard in the Tost Uul. This work resulted in him being lead author on a paper on prey abundance methodology, and he co-authored additional papers on snow leopard population dynamics and diet.

Lkhagvasumberel was part of an international research team that made the first-ever discovery of a wild snow leopard den.

Lkhagvasumberel traveled to India to strengthen his statistical and ecological skills, and in 2014 received a CREOi grant to train in the United States on wildlife handling and veterinary care practices for large mammals, aimed at building Mongolia's domestic capacity for snow leopard research and care.

As a co-author, Lkhagvasumberel published several articles in peer-reviewed scientific journals. He had a paper accepted for presentation at the Student Conference on Conservation Science and had secured an internship at United Kingdom zoos — indicating his research career was still actively expanding when he died in November 2015.

== Murder Attempts ==
Over the preceding two years prior to his death, Lkhagvasumberel had been subjected to at least three separate attacks by individuals opposed to his enforcement of protected area regulations at Tost Uul.

In May 2014, four men grabbed Lkhagvasumberel, cutting his hands and neck seven or eight times in Ulaanbaatar when he was walking home from university. When he collapsed with bleeding, the attackers, thinking they had killed him, fled. Lkhagvasuren regained consciousness at dawn, made his way home, and received medical treatment. The case was initially treated as a robbery. He recovered by July 2014 and traveled to Seattle on a scholarship to continue his snow leopard studies.

During the winter of 2014, Lkhagvasumberel was abducted by men in a black car, driven outside the city, and threatened with death, including threats against his three siblings if he didn't stay away from the area where he was protecting snow leopards. He reported it to the Mongolian Police Agency, who didn not take it seriously, concluded there was no criminal element to the case, and closed it.

In April 2015, two men on motorcycles stabbed him three times while riding through a mountain pass in Ömnögovi Province; he was airlifted to a hospital. His stab wounds (4.5 cm, 2 cm, 3.5 cm deep) were later used by police to argue he had inflicted them himself.

== Death ==
On 5 November 2015, T. Lkhagvasumberel left his home in Ulaanbaatar, reportedly telling those around him only that he was going to park his car in the garage and would return shortly. He then disappeared without a trace. Six days later, on 11 November, his vehicle, a Toyota Prado 120, was found abandoned on the shore of Lake Khövsgöl, near Khüsliin Khad, approximately 35 km northeast of Khatgal village in Alag-Erdene, Khövsgöl — over 700 km from Ulaanbaatar. The vehicle was discovered by a police officer, prompting an immediate search by staff of the Khövsgöl Province Emergency Management Agency. His body was found on 11 November 2015, in Lake Khövsgöl.

The authorities ruled that the cause of death was suicide-by-drowning. He died sometime between 6 and 9 November 2015. International scientists, journalists, activists and his family expressed doubt about this official explanation.

His father Tumursukh showed a phone recording of Lkhagvasumberel defiantly confronting people over mining licenses, plus emails describing the threats that had been sent to his employer, the Snow Leopard Conservation Fund. In January 2022, Mongolia's Minister of Environment and Tourism issued an order reversing a decision by his predecessor, N. Urtnasan, that had reassigned J. Tumursukh away from his post as Head of the Protected Area Administration of Ulaan Taiga State Special Protected Area; and restored Tumursukh to his former position, where he had previously worked for roughly ten years protecting endangered species.

More than 40 international researchers signed a formal letter demanding an inquiry; Mongolian female MPs, Oyungerel Tsedevdamba and Luvsangiin Erdenechimeg, got publicly involved, with then Minister of Justice D. Dorligjav criticizing the suicide ruling and noting lost evidence.

In 2017 and 2019, United Nations special rapporteur, John H. Knox, urged that the Mongolian government should reopen the investigation into the death of conservation ranger T. Lkhagvasümberel's case and protect other members of ranger and environmental protection services from potential risks.

Business and Human Rights Centre, an international human rights organisation, identifies the death of Lkhagvasumberel Tumursukh as killing.

=== Suspected motive ===
Lkhagvasumberel's parents and colleagues pointed to conflict between his enforcement of protected-area and anti-mining rules around Tost-Tosonbomba and mining interests, such as ninja miners, possibly tied to politically connected mining license holders like the politician and MP B. Choijilsuren who holds a large share of mining-related permits in the area.

== Reactions and Legacy ==
Lkhagvasumberel's death triggered intense media attention in Mongolia and a nationwide grassroots campaign, drawing in politicians and journalists, generating hundreds of thousands of letters, and inspiring a documentary, which turned a local issue into national front-page news. The 6th of April, on which the Standing Committee on Environment, Food, and Agriculture of Mongolia's parliament was set to discuss placing the Tost-Tosonbumbi range under state special protection, coincided with the date of late Lkhagvasumberel's birthday. A Mongolian Member of Parliament recommended that the resolution placing the Tosonbumbi range under special protection could even be named after the late T. Lkhagvasümberel during the session. In April 2016, State Great Khural voted to designate Tost Mountains a State Nature Reserve, with 80% of deputies in favor.

On 9 August 2019, a peaceful demonstration was held at Sükhbaatar Square in Ulaanbaatar calling for mining operations in the Tost-Tosonbumbi range to be halted, for the case of ranger and biologist Lkhagvasumberel Tumursukh's death to be reinvestigated, and for those who ordered and carried out the killing to be identified and prosecuted. The demonstration drew participation from civil society groups, ordinary citizens, and local residents, including representatives from Gurvantes, Ömnögovi Province where Tost-Tosonbumbi is located. Local representatives alleged that mining by the company South Gobi Coal Trans (Note: In 2019, the Government revoked the special licences held by South Gobi Coal Trans LLC operating in the Tost and Toson Bumba Mountains in Gurvantes in order to protect the area due to the fact that the company's activities were found to be incompatible with the protected status of the area.) in the area primarily benefited MP B. Choijilsüren, while degrading drinking water supplies, damaging the environment, and causing wildlife deaths, without providing meaningful economic benefit to local residents who were only hired for low-paid positions rather than technical or engineering roles. More than 400 demonstrators signed a petition demanding a reinvestigation into Tumursukh's death and supporting state protection status for the Tost-Tosonbumbi region. The petition was to be submitted to Mongolia's National Security Council and government.

In 2022, a song titled "Uulsyn Khüü" ("Son of the Mountains") was released in Lkhagvasumberel's memory. The song lyrics were written by fellow Khövsgöl native J. Davaadamdin, the melody composed by Honored Cultural Figure T. Ser-Od, and performed by singer and former MP Samandyn Javkhlan.

== Publications ==
- Samelius, Gustaf, Kulbhushansingh Suryawanshi, Jens Frank, Bayarjargal Agvaantseren, Erdenechimeg Baasandamba, Tserennadmid Mijiddorj, Örjan Johansson, Lkhagvasumberel Tumursukh, and Charudutt Mishra. “Keeping Predators out: Testing Fences to Reduce Livestock Depredation at Night-Time Corrals.” Oryx 55, no. 3 (2021): 466–72. https://doi.org/10.1017/S0030605319000565.
- Tumursukh, Lkhagvasumberel, Kulbhushansingh R. Suryawanshi, Charudutt Mishra, Thomas M. McCarthy, and Bazartseren Boldgiv. “Status of the Mountain Ungulate Prey of the Endangered Snow Leopard Panthera Uncia in the Tost Local Protected Area, South Gobi, Mongolia.” Oryx 50, no. 2 (2016): 214–19. https://doi.org/10.1017/S0030605314001203.
- Johansson, Örjan, Geir Rune Rauset, Gustaf Samelius, Tom McCarthy, Henrik Andrén, Lkhagvasumberel Tumursukh, and Charudutt Mishra. "Land sharing is essential for snow leopard conservation." Biological Conservation 203 (2016): 1–7. https://doi.org/10.1016/j.biocon.2016.08.034.
- Johansson, Örjan, Tom McCarthy, Gustaf Samelius, Henrik Andrén, Lkhagvasumberel Tumursukh, and Charudutt Mishra. "Snow leopard predation in a livestock dominated landscape in Mongolia." Biological Conservation 184 (2015): 251–258. https://doi.org/10.1016/j.biocon.2015.02.003.

== See also ==
- Environmental issues in Mongolia
- List of environmental killings
- Corruption in Mongolia
- Tost Tosonbumba Nature Reserve
- Siberian ibex
- Snow leopard
