= Bayarjargal Agvaantseren =

Mongolian conservationist (born 1969)

- Born: 11 January 1969 (age 57); Rashaant, Khövsgöl

Bayarjargal (Bayara) Agvaantseren (born 11 January 1969) is a Mongolian conservationist who has campaigned to save the habitat of the snow leopard in an area of the South Gobi Desert which has become a major mining hub. Thanks to her successful efforts to create the 8163-km^{2} Tost Tosonbumba Nature Reserve and to have the authorities cancel 37 mining licences, in 2019 she was awarded the Goldman Environmental Prize.

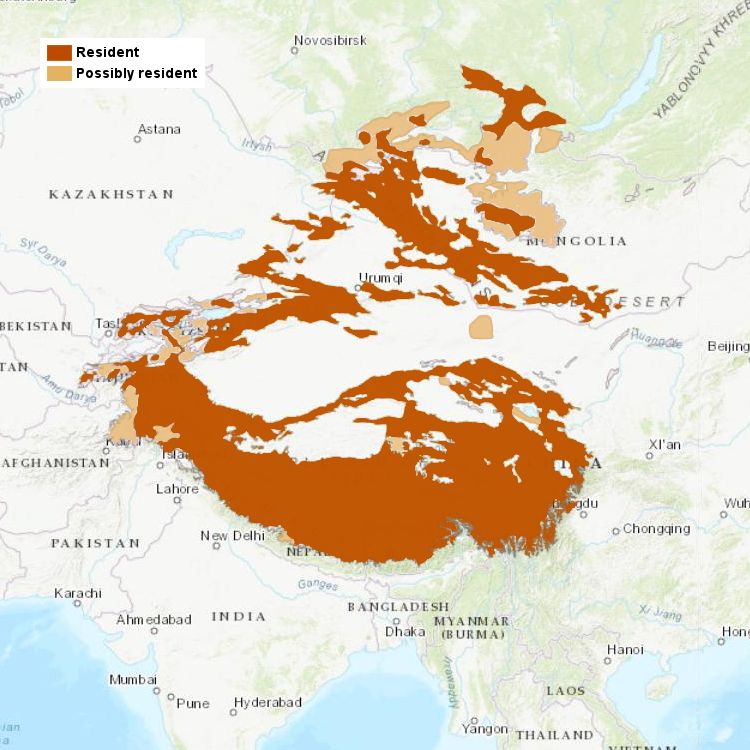
Snow leopard habitats

== Biography ==
Born on 11 January 1969 in Rashaant, Khövsgöl Province, Bayarjargal Agvaantseren worked from the early 1990s as a language teacher and translator, specializing in English and Russian. In 1997, interested in the local environment, she spent the summer translating a research study for the Snow Leopard Trust. From 1997, she devoted her career to saving snow leopards and helping to sustain rural families. In 1997, she was appointed a programme manager for Snow Leopard Enterprises, a post she held until 2007 when she joined the Snow Leopard Trust as Mongolia Programme Director. Aware of the difficulties faced by local herdsmen and their families, that year she founded the Snow Leopard Conservation Foundation, a NGO designed to help rural women create and sell their valuable handicrafts while creating awareness of the need for snow leopard conservation.

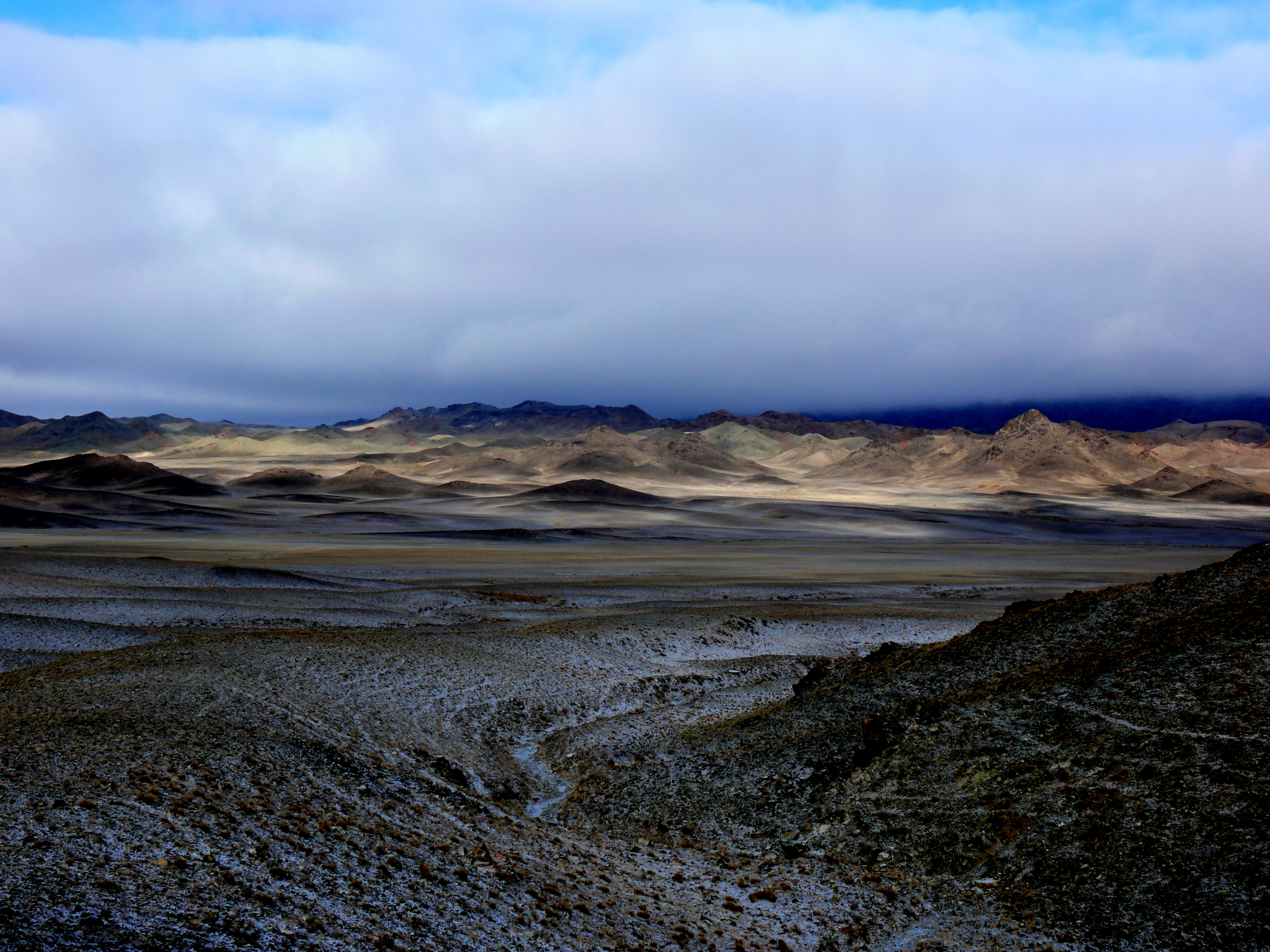
Tost landscape

In 2009, realizing that her efforts towards conservation in the Tost region were threatened by mining interests, she began to focus her attention on political initiatives, mobilizing the local community to campaign for the protection of the landscape and its snow leopards. Her efforts continued year after year, finally leading the Mongolian parliament to designate the Tost Mountains a State Protected Area in 2016, as 80% of its deputies voting in favour of the proposal. Now known as the Tost Tosonbumba Nature Reserve, all the mining licences in the area have since been cancelled.

Thanks to her efforts to protect the Tost habitat of the snow leopard and the lives of the local families, in April 2019 she was one of six environmentalists from around the world who received the Goldman Environmental Prize.

Her recent work focuses on slow leopard depredation. “We wanted to work with the herders, to bring them around by addressing the economic losses they suffered from the leopards,” said Agvaantseren in a 2019 interview.
