= Gobi Museum of Nature and History =

Museum in Dalanzadgad, Ömnögovi, Mongolia

- Говийн байгаль, түүхийн музей
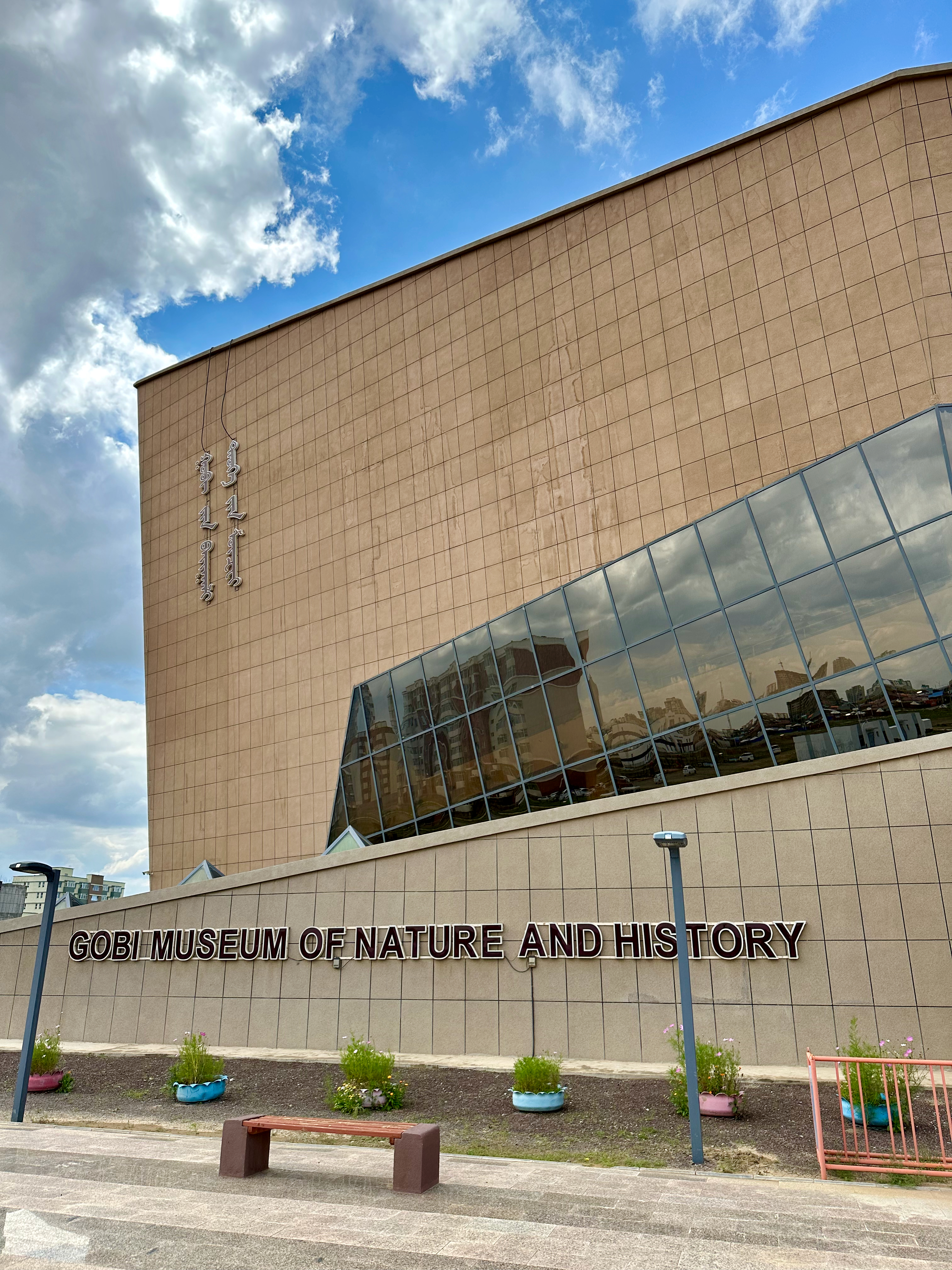
- Established: 18 May 2022
- Location: Dalanzadgad, Ömnögovi, Mongolia
- Coordinates: 43°35′01.8″N 104°25′35.8″E
- Type: museum
- Collection size: 4,000

The Gobi Museum of Nature and History (Mongolian: Говийн байгаль, түүхийн музей) is a museum in Dalanzadgad, Ömnögovi Province, Mongolia.

== History ==
The museum was opened on 18 May 2022.

== Exhibitions ==
The museum houses more than 4,000 artifacts. The collections range from traces of human civilization within the area, relics, fossils and works from various craftsmen.

== Finance ==
The museum was constructed with a cost of MNT10.9 billion. The fund came from Gobi Oyu Development Support Fund of Oyu Tolgoi LLC.

== See also ==
- List of museums in Mongolia
