= Gurvan tes, Ömnögovi =

District in Ömnögovi Province, Mongolia

Coordinates: 43°13′47″N 101°02′49″E

Gurvan tes District Гурвантэс сум ᠭᠤᠷᠪᠠᠨᠲᠡᠰᠰᠤᠮᠤ
- District
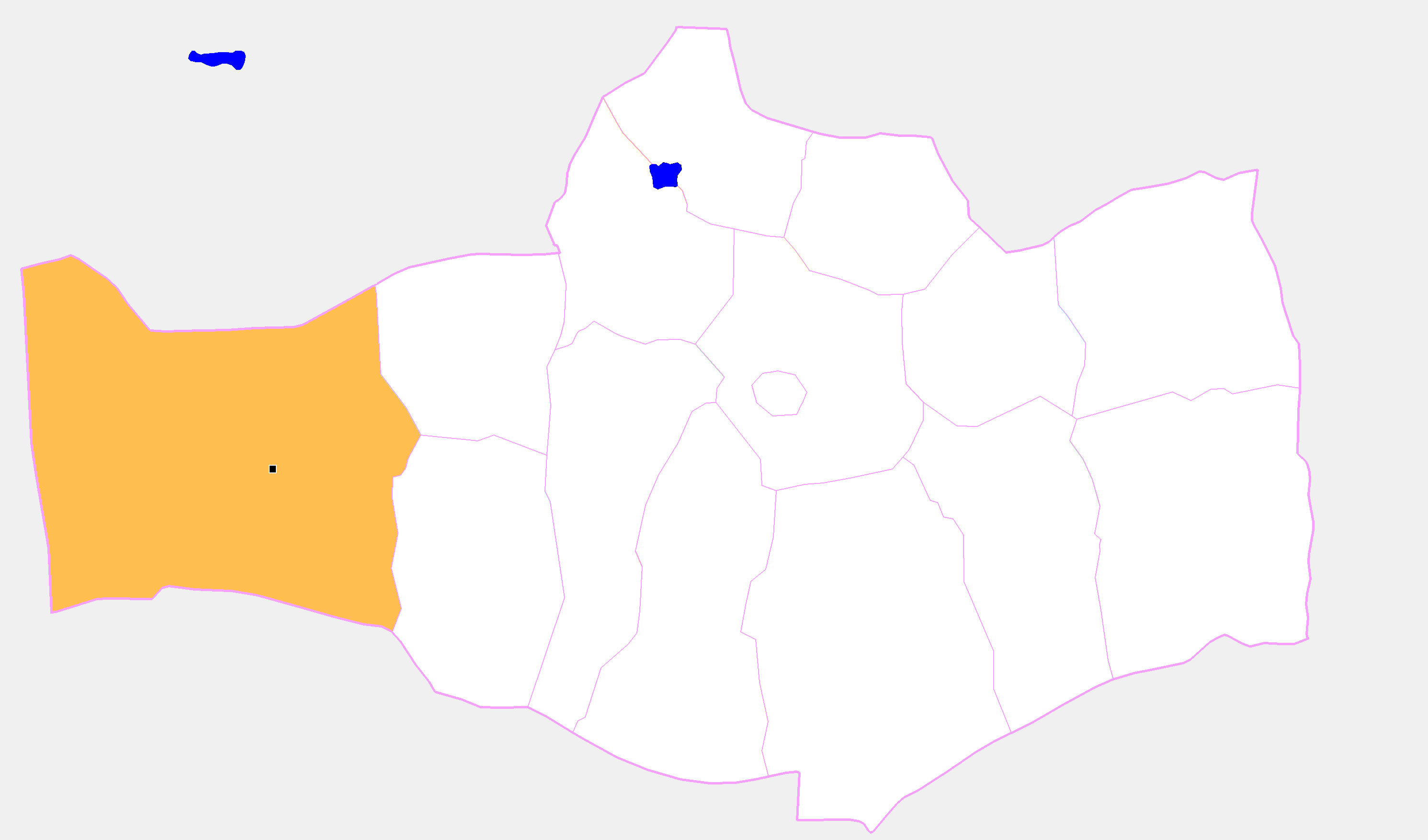
- Gurvan tes District in Ömnögovi Province
- Country: Mongolia
- Province: Ömnögovi Province

Area
  - Total: 27,967 km^{2} (10,798 sq mi)
- Time zone: UTC+8 (UTC + 8)

Gurvan tes (Mongolian: Гурван тэс, Three salt deposits) is a district of Ömnögovi Province in southern Mongolia. The Nariin Sukhait mining complex (Ovoot Tolgoi) is 25 km southeast of the sum center. In 2009, its population was 4,034.

== Geography ==
It is the western most district in Ömnögovi Province. It is also the largest district by area in the province.

== Administrative divisions ==
The district is divided into five bags, which are:

- Baga-Ovoo
- Bayasakh
- Goyoot
- Tost
- Urt

== See also ==
- Lkhagvasumberel Tumursukh
