= Central Library of Ömnögovi Province =

Public library in Dalanzadgad, Ömnögovi , Mongolia

- Өмнөговь аймгийн төв номын сан
- 43°34′22.6″N 104°25′48.6″E
- Location: Dalanzadgad, Ömnögovi, Mongolia
- Type: public library
- Established: 1944

The Central Library of Ömnögovi Province (Mongolian: Өмнөговь аймгийн төв номын сан) is a public library in Dalanzadgad, Ömnögovi Province, Mongolia.

== History ==
The library was established in 1944. During the library's 80th birthday in 2024, it organized a celebration to commemorate the anniversary.

== See also ==
- National Library of Mongolia
