= Dalanzadgad =

Provincial capital of Ömnögovi Province, Mongolia

Dalanzadgad Даланзадгад ᠳᠠᠯᠠᠨ ᠵᠠᠳᠠᠭᠠᠳ
- City
- Dalanzadgad District; Даланзадгад сум ᠳᠠᠯᠠᠨ ᠵᠠᠳᠠᠭᠠᠳ ᠰᠤᠮᠤ
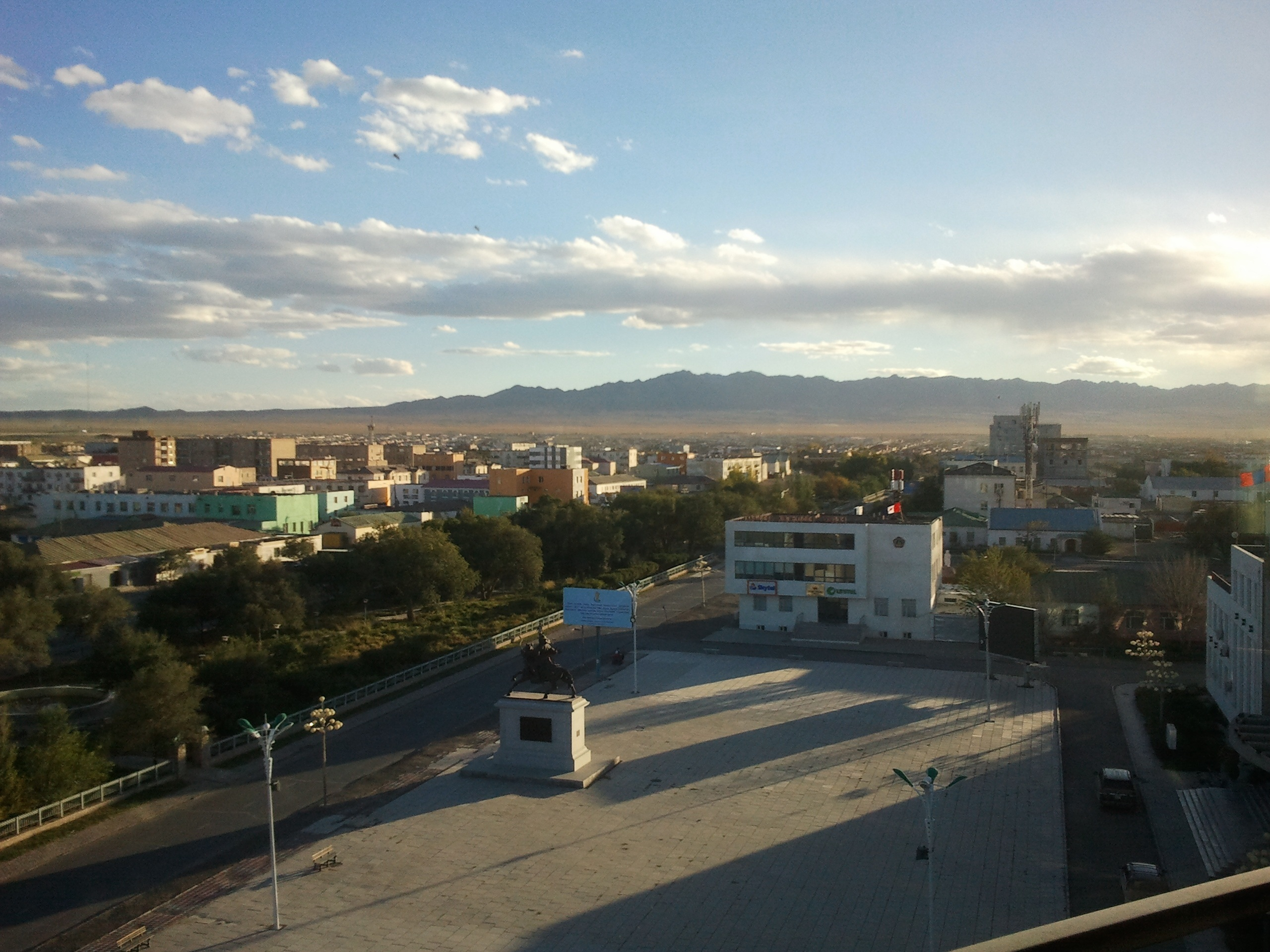
- The center of Dalanzadgad

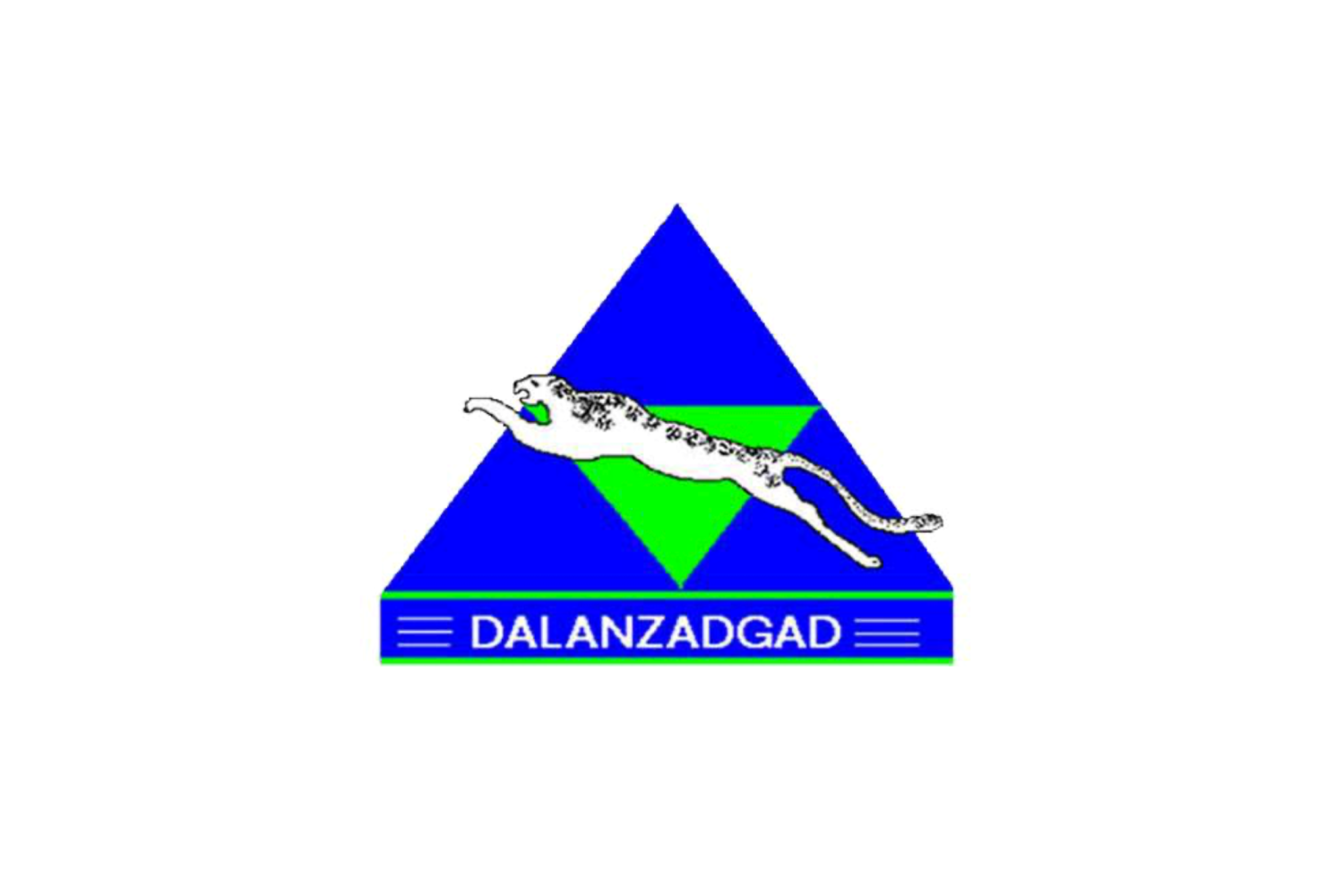
- Flag

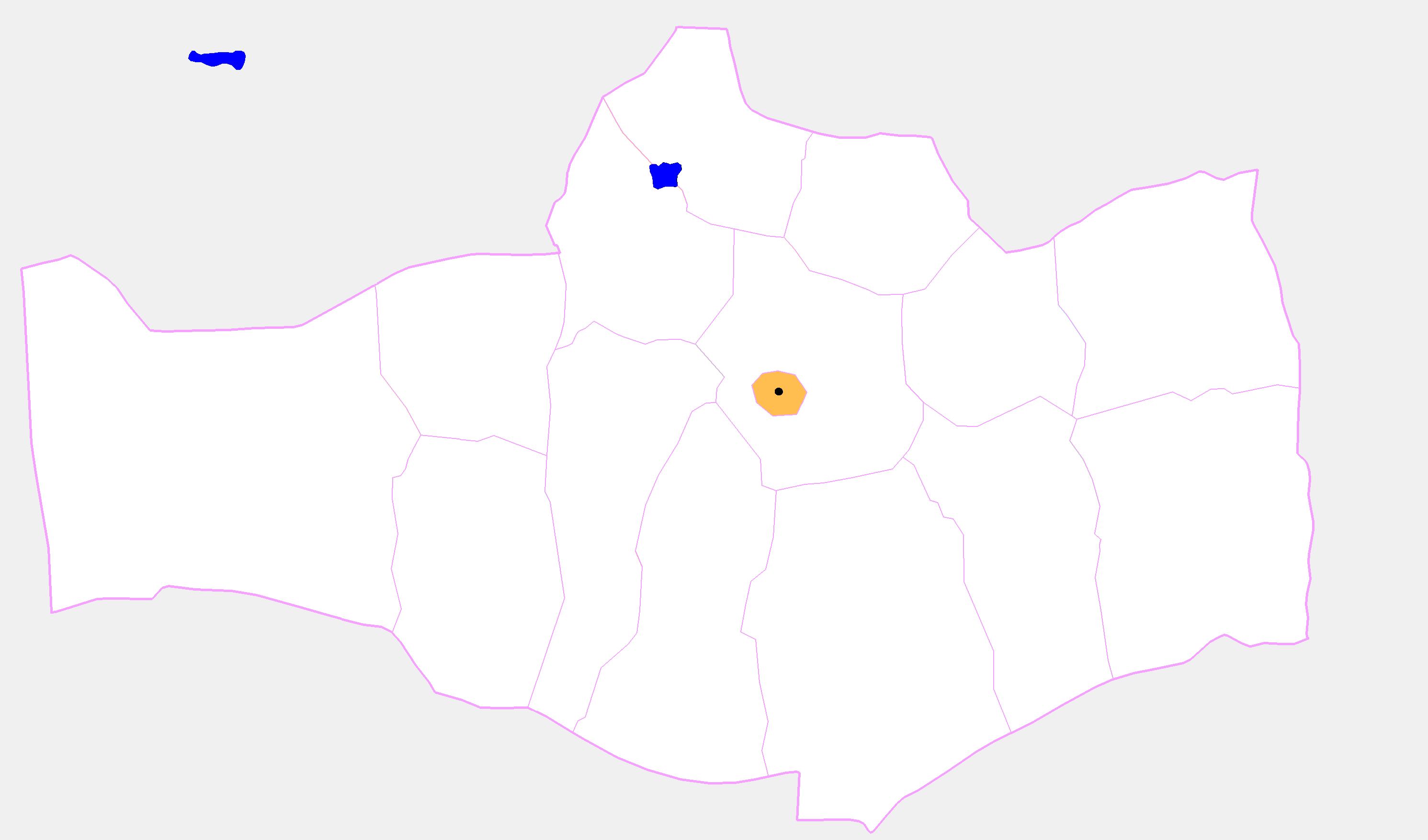
- Dalanzadgad City in Ömnögovi Province

- Location within Mongolia
- Coordinates: 43°34′06″N 104°24′50″E
- Country: Mongolia
- Province: Ömnögovi Province
- Subprovince: Utah
- Former Subprovince: Ze
- Government: The Office of the Dalanzadgad City Governor

Area
  - Total: 476 km^{2} (184 sq mi)
- Elevation: 1,470 m (4,820 ft)

Population (2024)
  - Total: 32,674
  - Density: 68.6/km^{2} (178/sq mi)
- Time zone: UTC+08:00 (ULAT)
- Postal code of SouthGobi: 64000

Dalanzadgad (Mongolian: Даланзадгад [táɮənt͡sətqət] "seventy springs") is the capital of Ömnögovi Province, Mongolia. It is located 540 kilometers (340 mi) south of the national capital Ulaanbaatar. The altitude of the city center is 1,470 metres (4,823 ft). As of 2024, its population is 32,674.

== Climate ==
Dalanzadgad experiences a cold desert climate (Köppen BWk, Trewartha BWac) with cold winters and warm summers. By Mongolian standards it is one of the warmest places in the country during winter. Along with Tsetserleg and Arvaikheer it was warmer than Hohhot in January 2014 and 2015. A unique steppe micro-climate with running streams and lush grass can be found in the nearby Yolyn Am valley.

Climate data for Dalanzadgad, elevation 1,462 m (4,797 ft), (1991–2020 normals, extremes 1936–present)
Month	Jan	Feb	Mar	Apr	May	Jun	Jul	Aug	Sep	Oct	Nov	Dec	Year
Record high °C (°F)	16.0 (60.8)	18.9 (66.0)	22.2 (72.0)	30.7 (87.3)	33.8 (92.8)	37.4 (99.3)	39.9 (103.8)	37.5 (99.5)	33.0 (91.4)	29.0 (84.2)	18.9 (66.0)	13.6 (56.5)	39.9 (103.8)
Mean daily maximum °C (°F)	−7.1 (19.2)	−2.1 (28.2)	5.9 (42.6)	14.8 (58.6)	21.4 (70.5)	26.7 (80.1)	29.2 (84.6)	27.2 (81.0)	21.2 (70.2)	12.5 (54.5)	2.8 (37.0)	−5.0 (23.0)	12.3 (54.1)
Daily mean °C (°F)	−13.9 (7.0)	−9.2 (15.4)	−1.1 (30.0)	8.0 (46.4)	14.7 (58.5)	20.4 (68.7)	23.0 (73.4)	21.0 (69.8)	14.8 (58.6)	5.8 (42.4)	−3.9 (25.0)	−11.7 (10.9)	5.7 (42.2)
Mean daily minimum °C (°F)	−19.3 (−2.7)	−15.4 (4.3)	−7.6 (18.3)	−1.3 (29.7)	8.1 (46.6)	14.0 (57.2)	17.1 (62.8)	15.1 (59.2)	8.7 (47.7)	−0.3 (31.5)	−9.6 (14.7)	−17.1 (1.2)	−0.6 (30.9)
Record low °C (°F)	−32.8 (−27.0)	−31.1 (−24.0)	−27.8 (−18.0)	−20.0 (−4.0)	−8.9 (16.0)	−1.1 (30.0)	5.4 (41.7)	3.9 (39.0)	−12.8 (9.0)	−17.2 (1.0)	−28.9 (−20.0)	−36.1 (−33.0)	−36.1 (−33.0)
Average precipitation mm (inches)	2 (0.1)	3 (0.1)	4 (0.2)	4 (0.2)	11 (0.4)	22 (0.9)	33 (1.3)	29 (1.1)	15 (0.6)	5 (0.2)	3 (0.1)	3 (0.1)	134 (5.3)
Average precipitation days (≥ 1.0 mm)	1.3	1.4	1.8	1.7	3.1	3.8	5.4	4.4	2.8	2.0	1.8	2.5	32.0
Average relative humidity (%)	61.0	51.5	40.3	32.1	32.0	36.8	42.4	43.4	39.0	41.4	51.1	59.1	44.2
Mean monthly sunshine hours	262	221	253	264	316	304	291	299	279	268	233	229	3,219
Mean daily sunshine hours	6.7	7.6	8.3	8.8	9.7	11.0	11.0	9.8	9.9	8.9	7.4	6.4	8.8
Source 1: Pogoda.ru.net
Source 2: NOAA, Deutscher Wetterdienst (sun, 1961–1990)

== Administrative divisions ==
The district is divided into ten bags, which are:

- Baruunsaikhan
- Chandmani
- Dalan
- Dundsaikhan
- Ikh-Uul
- Khan-Uul
- Nachin
- Oyuut
- Tsagaan bulag
- Zuunsaikhan

== Infrastructure ==
=== Communications and Power ===
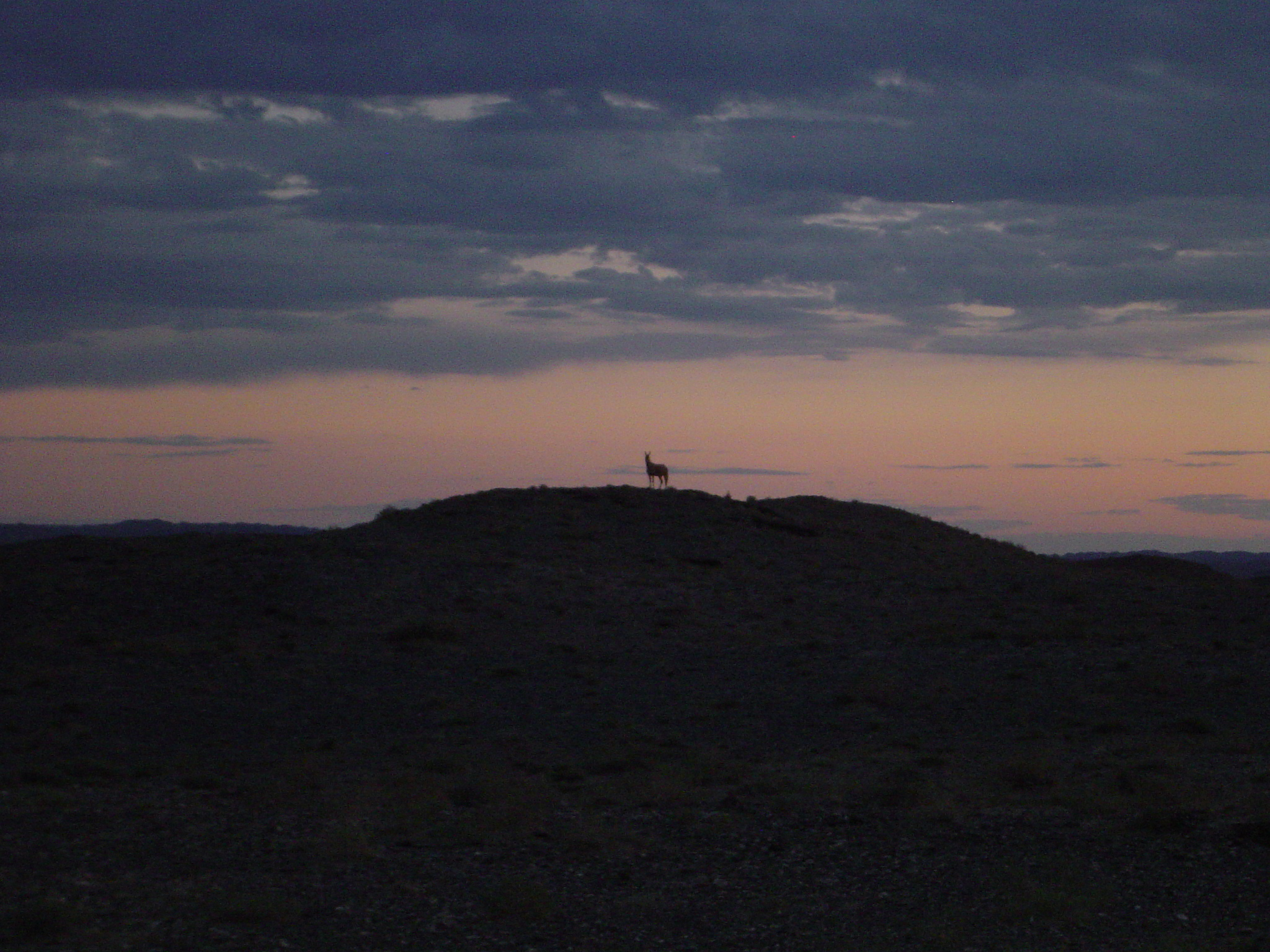
A Khulan (Mongolian Wild Ass) on a hill in the Gobi, near Dalanzadgad, Mongolia at sunset.

There is GSM coverage in the city the same as in other major locations - the coverage is good for about a mile out of the city. Usually, the city is also supplied with electric power 24 hours a day. Near Dalanzadgad, at 43°31′54.38″N 104°24′4.16″E, there is a longwave broadcasting station working on 209 kHz with 75 kW.

- Dalanzadgad Thermal Power Plant

=== Waste water processing ===
- Dalanzadgad Wastewater Treatment Plant
- Dalanzadgad New Wastewater Treatment Plant

== Tourist attractions ==
- Central Library of Ömnögovi Province
- Gobi Museum of Nature and History

== Transportation ==
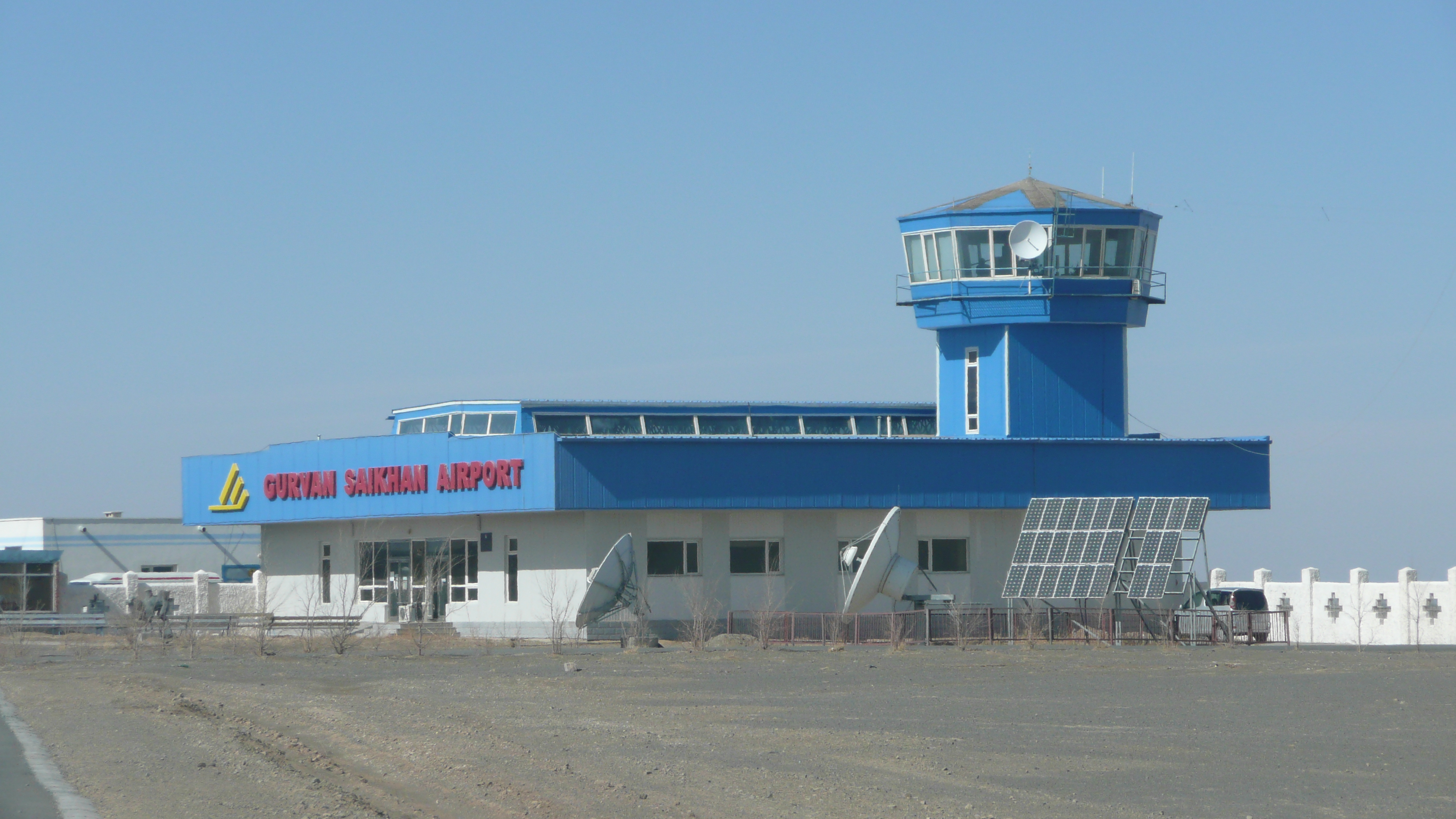
Dalanzadgad Airport

Dalanzadgad Airport (ZMDZ/DLZ) is served by regular domestic flights from and to Ulaanbaatar. There are summer and winter timetables.

In 2007, the Mongolian Civil Aviation Authority built a new airport with a paved runway. The runway is second longest in the country after Buyant-Ukhaa International Airport. Before that, the airport had only one gravel runway.

Dalanzadgad has a paved road connecting it with Ulaanbaatar. There is no direct road access across the Gobi desert to China.

== Gallery ==
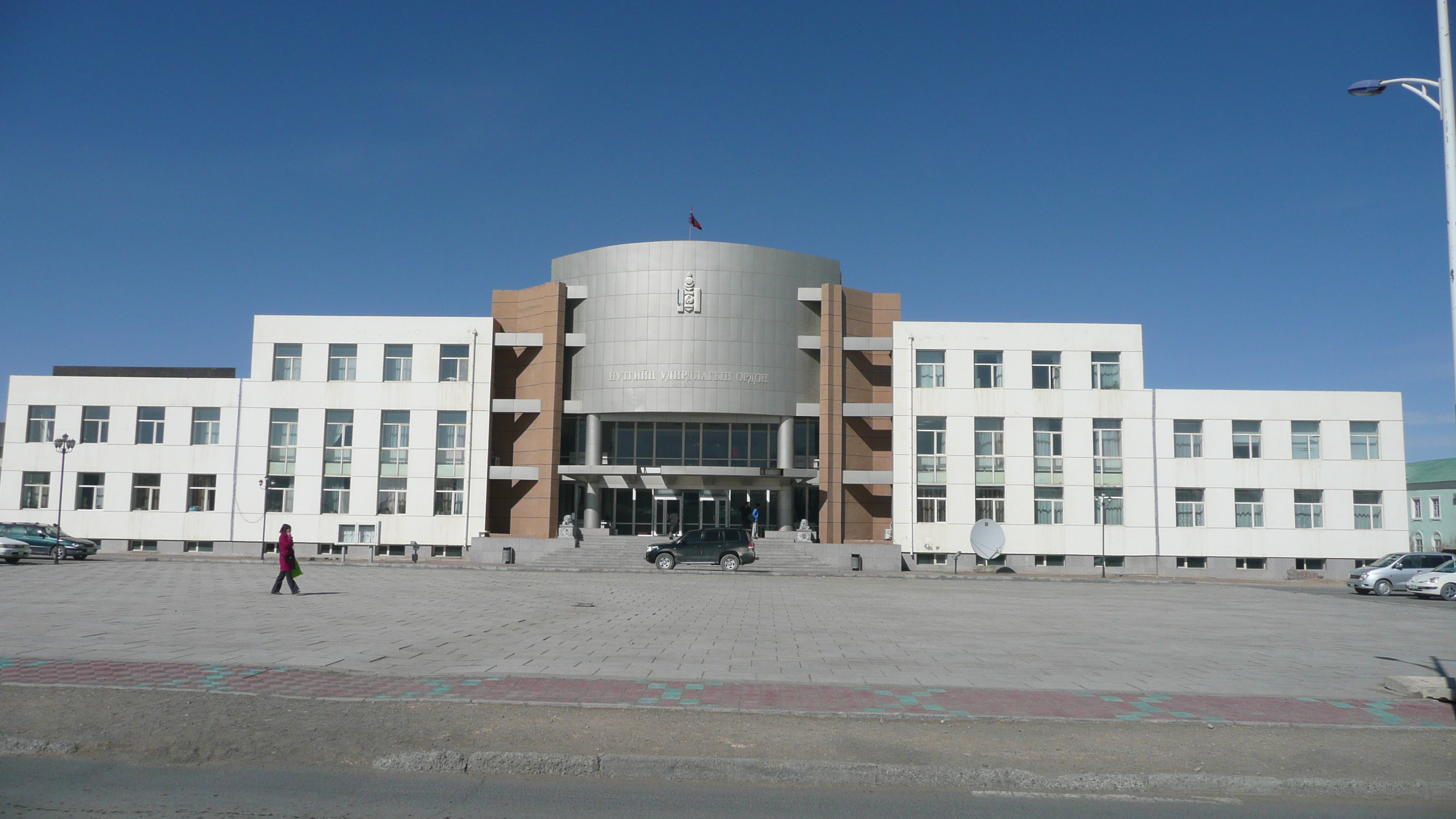
Provincial Government Building.

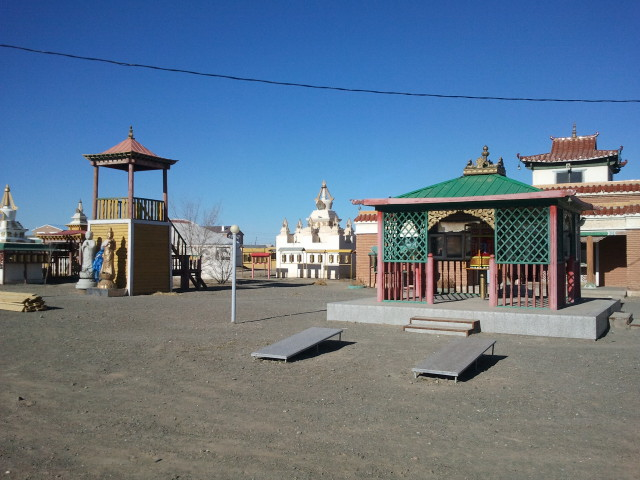
Temple.

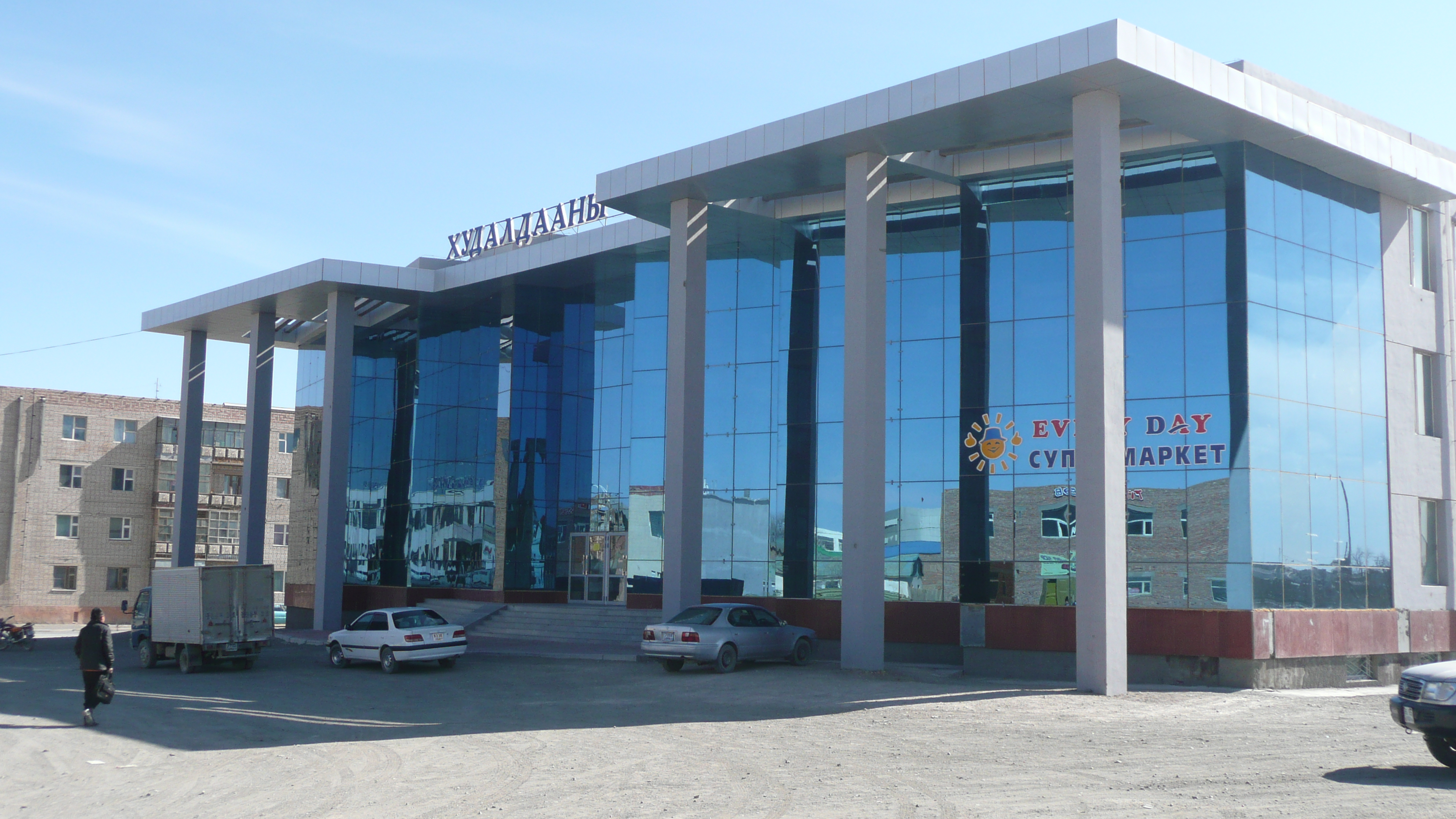
Gandirs Shopping center.

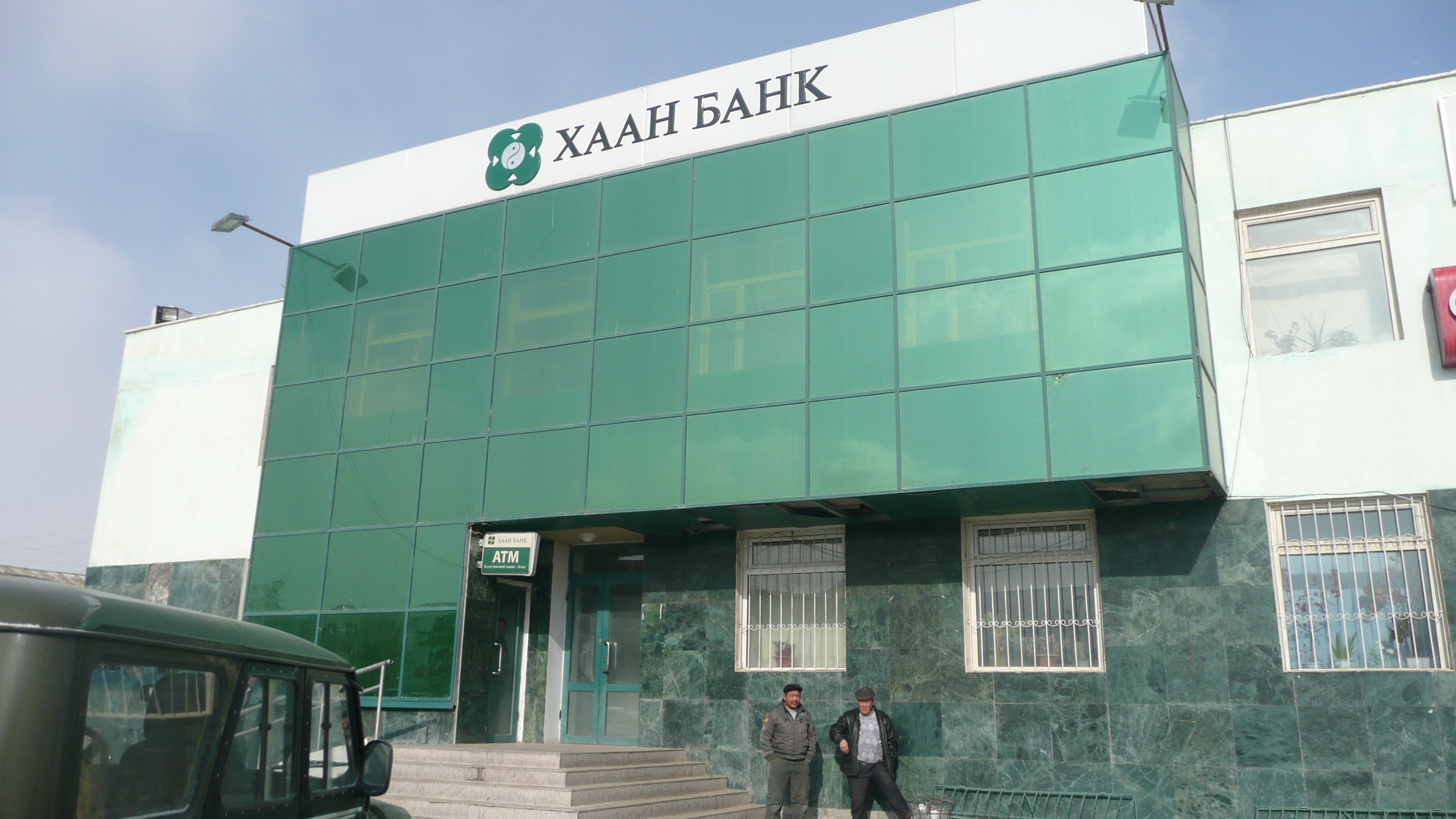
The old Khan Bank.

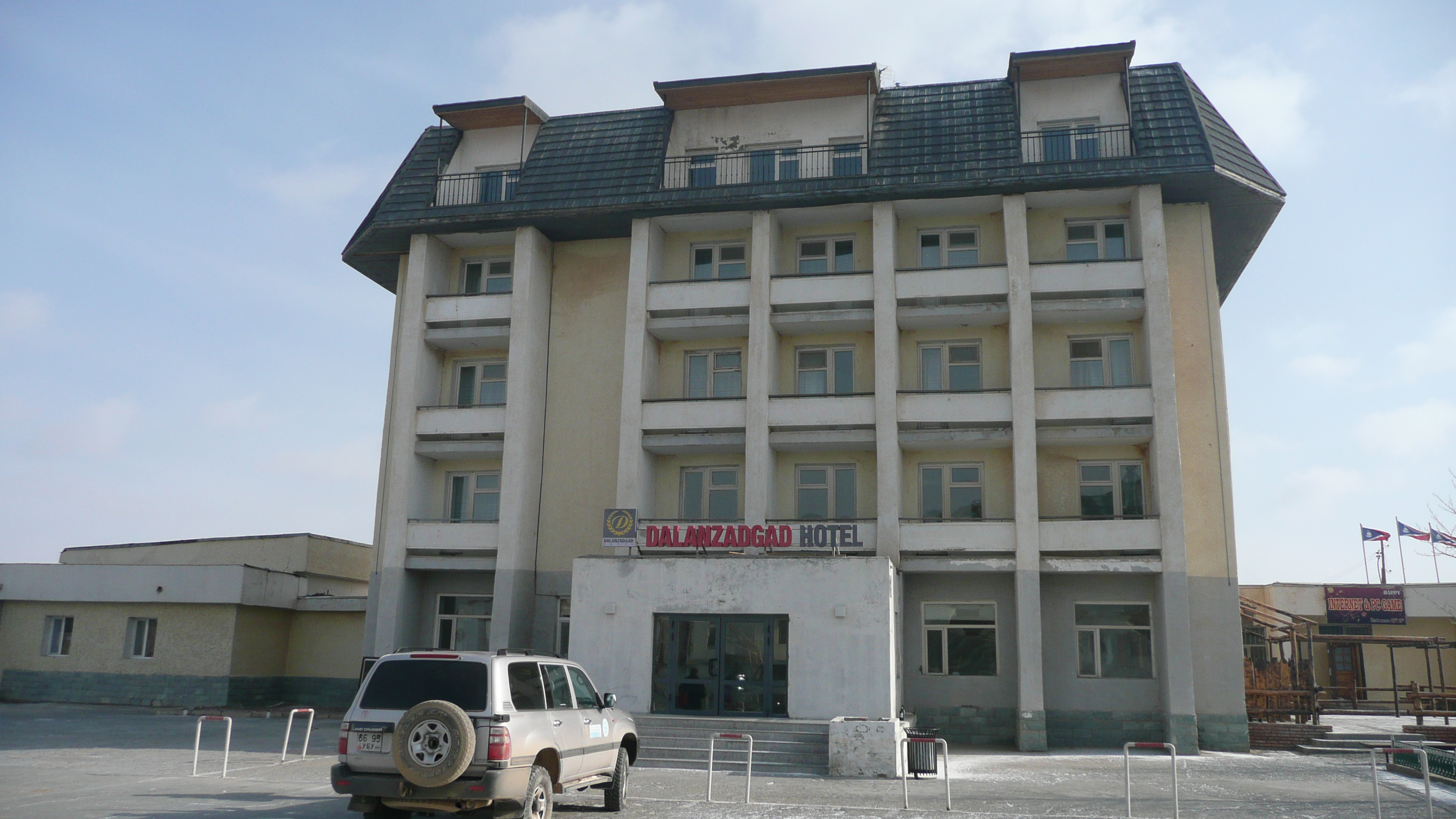
Hotel Dalanzadgad.

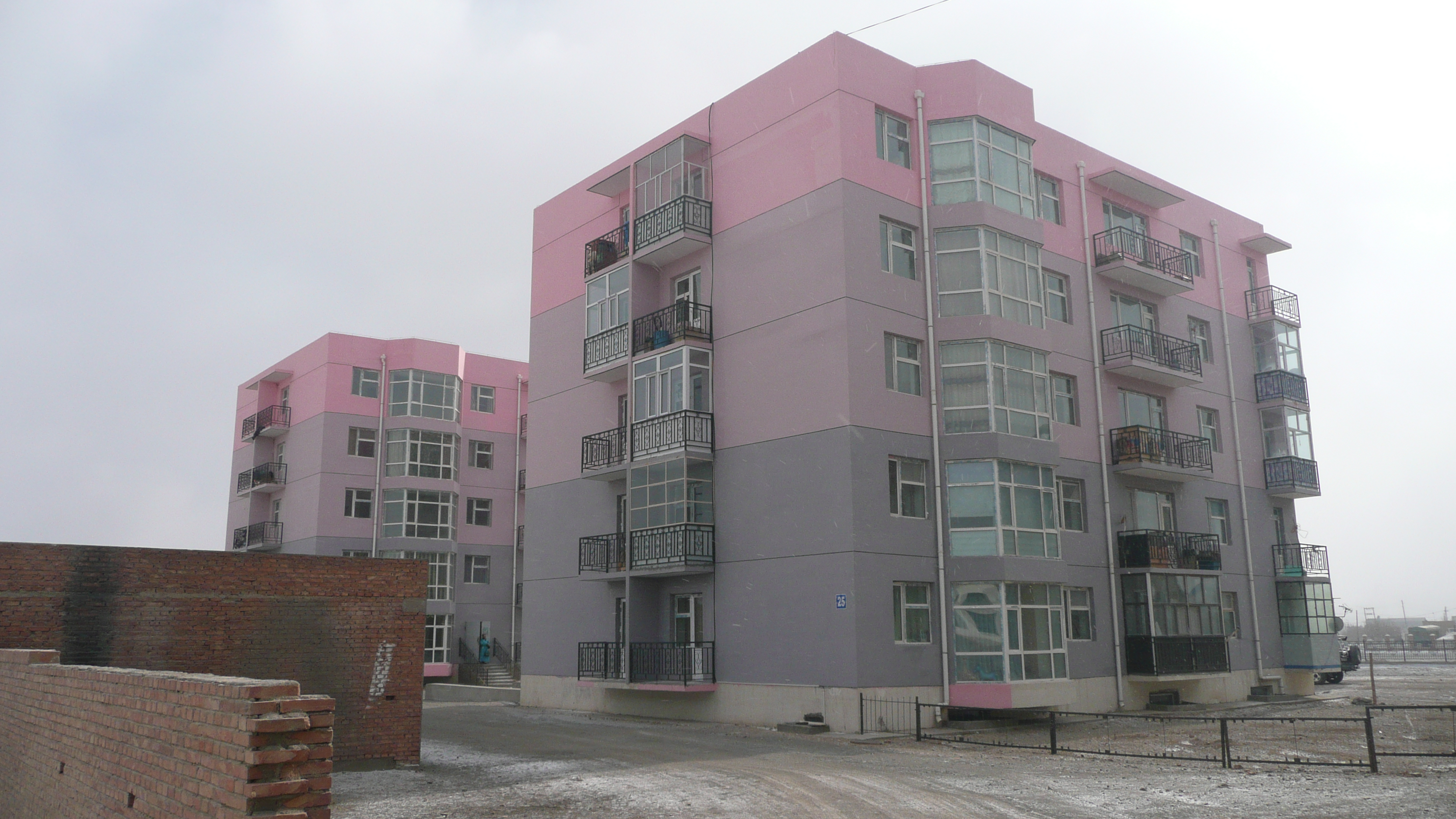
Apartment buildings.

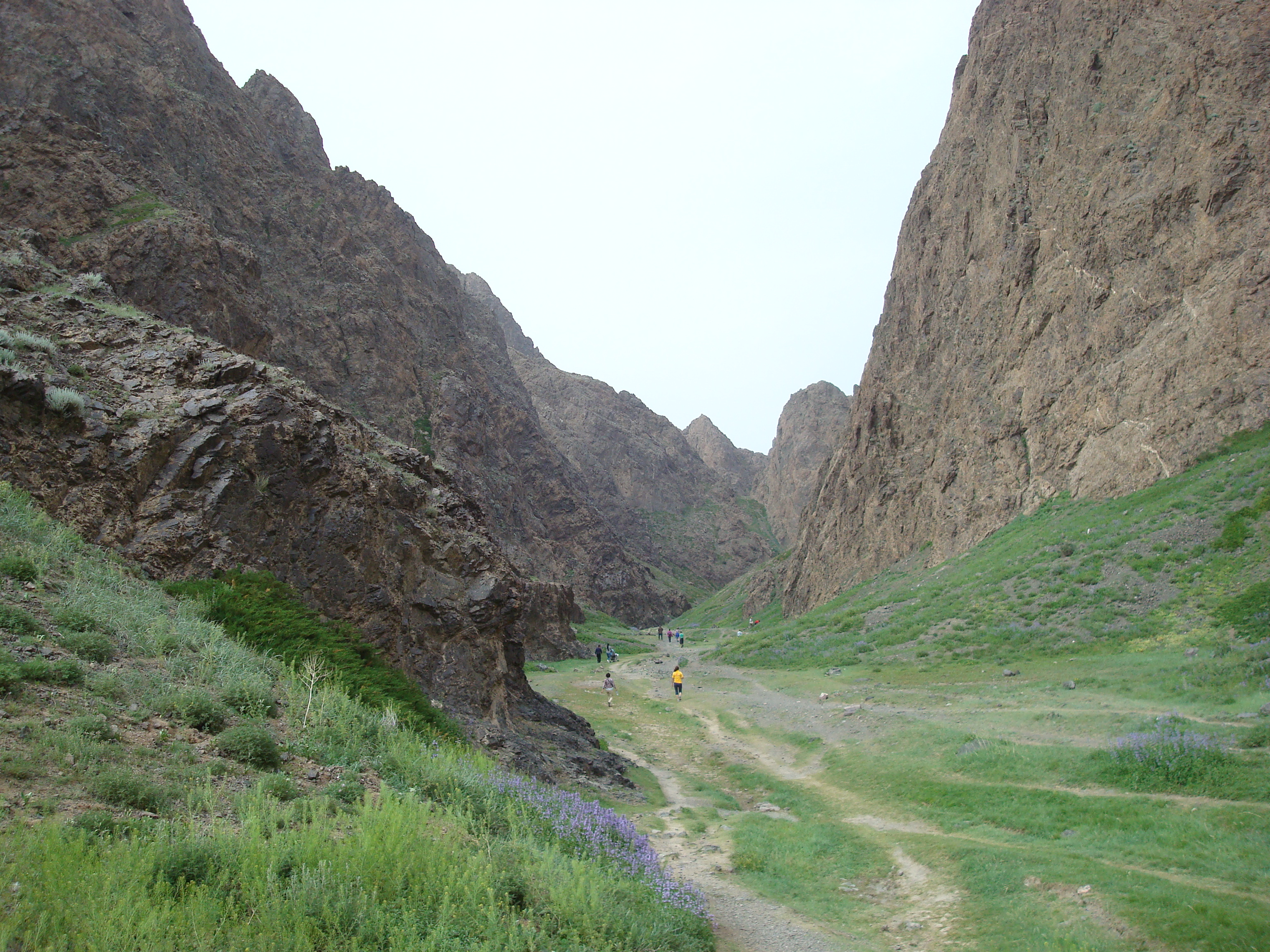
Steppe micro-climate in nearby Yolyn Am.

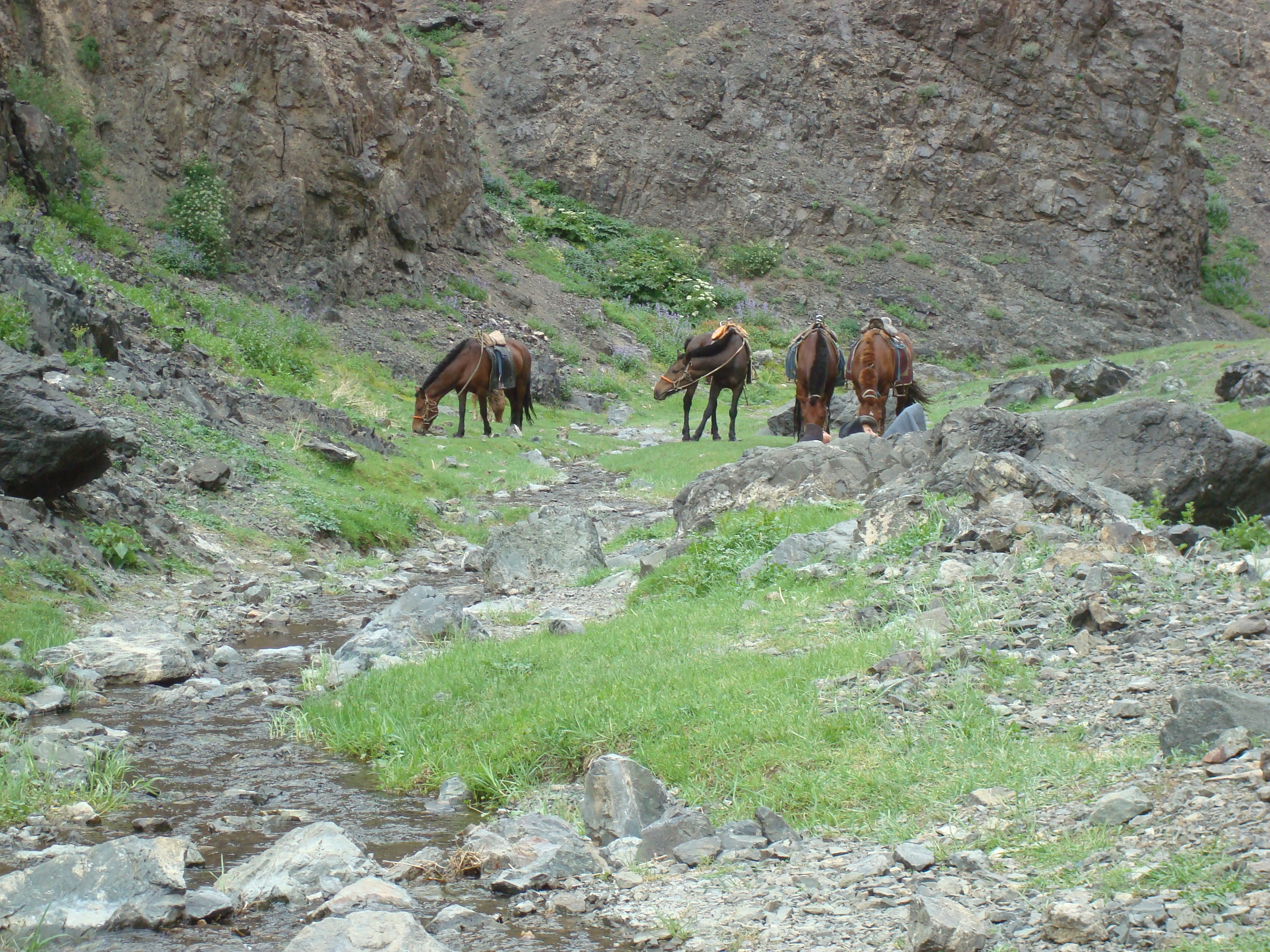
Steppe micro-climate in Yolyn Am.

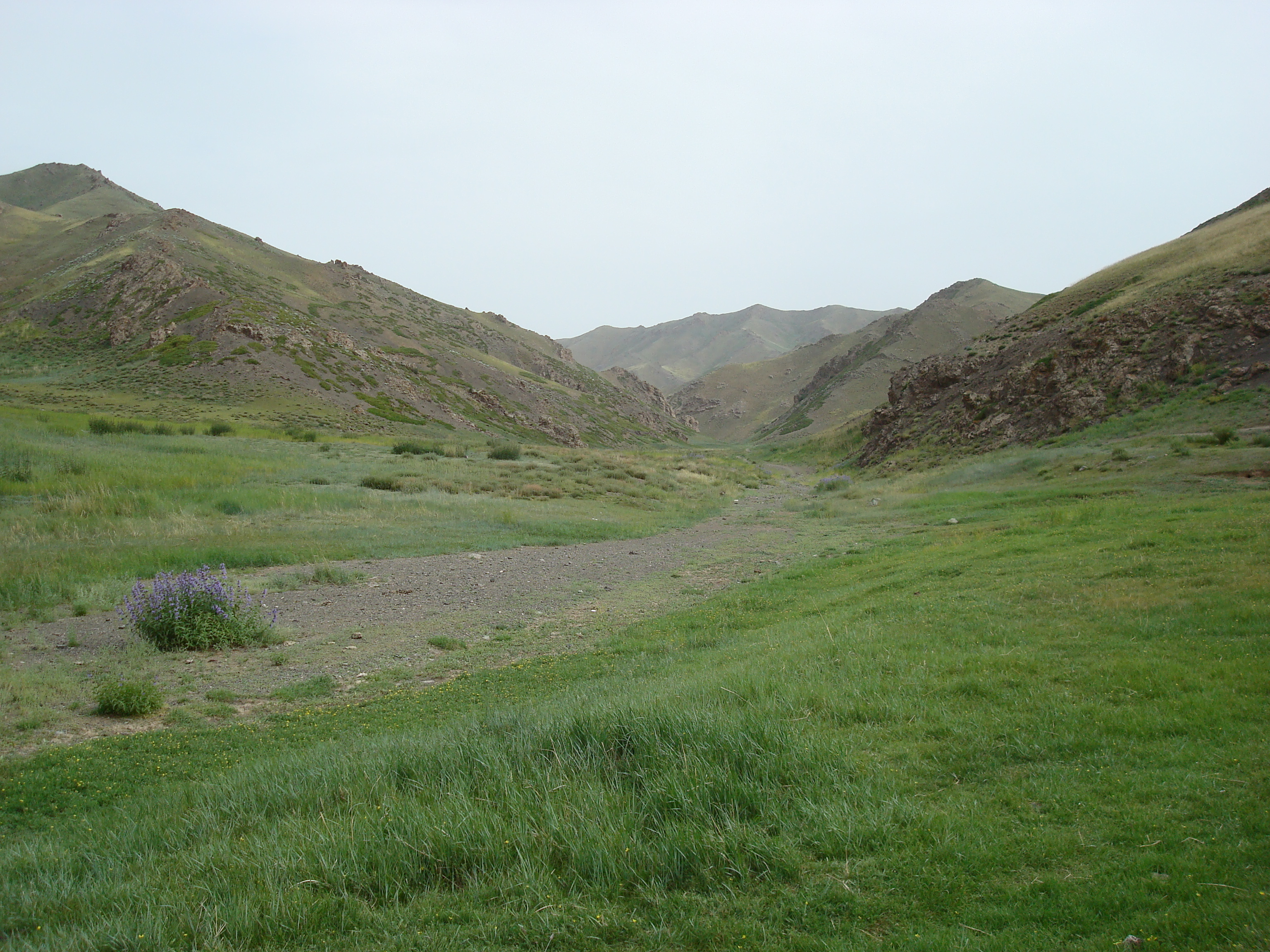
Steppe micro-climate in Yolyn Am.

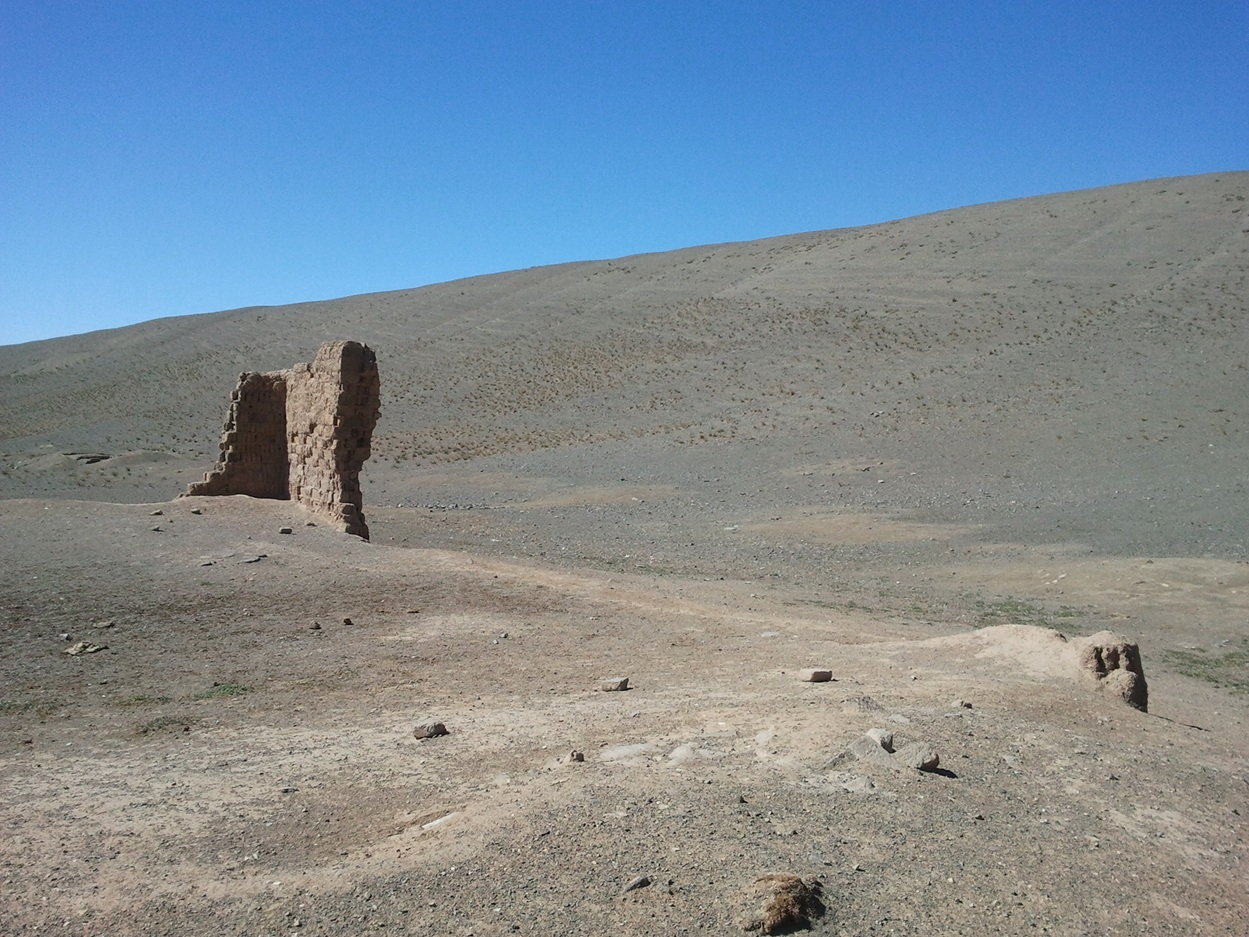
Monastery ruins near Dalanzadgad.
