= Environmental issues in Mongolia =

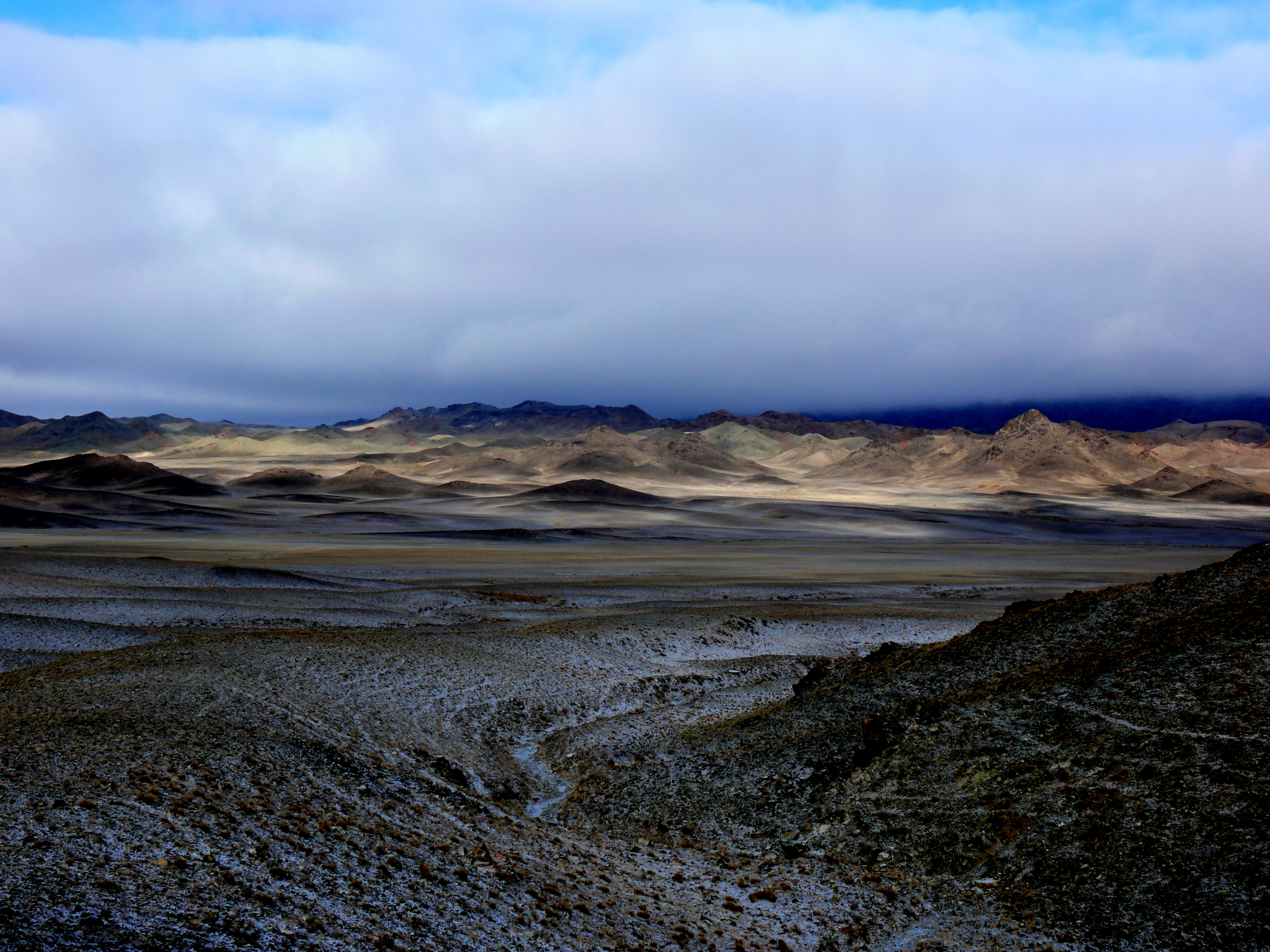
The Gobi Desert, Ömnögovi Province. Desertification is a key issue in Mongolia.

There are many pressing environmental issues in Mongolia that are detrimental to both human and environmental wellness. These problems have arisen in part due to natural factors, but increasingly because of human actions. One of these issues is climate change, which will be responsible for an increase in desertification, natural disasters, and land degradation. Another is deforestation, which is expanding due to human activity, pests, disease, and fires. Mongolian lands are becoming more arid through desertification, a process that is being exacerbated due to irresponsible land use. Additionally, more and more species are disappearing and at risk for extinction. Moreover, especially in population centers, Mongolians deal with air and water pollution caused by industrialization.

== Climate change ==
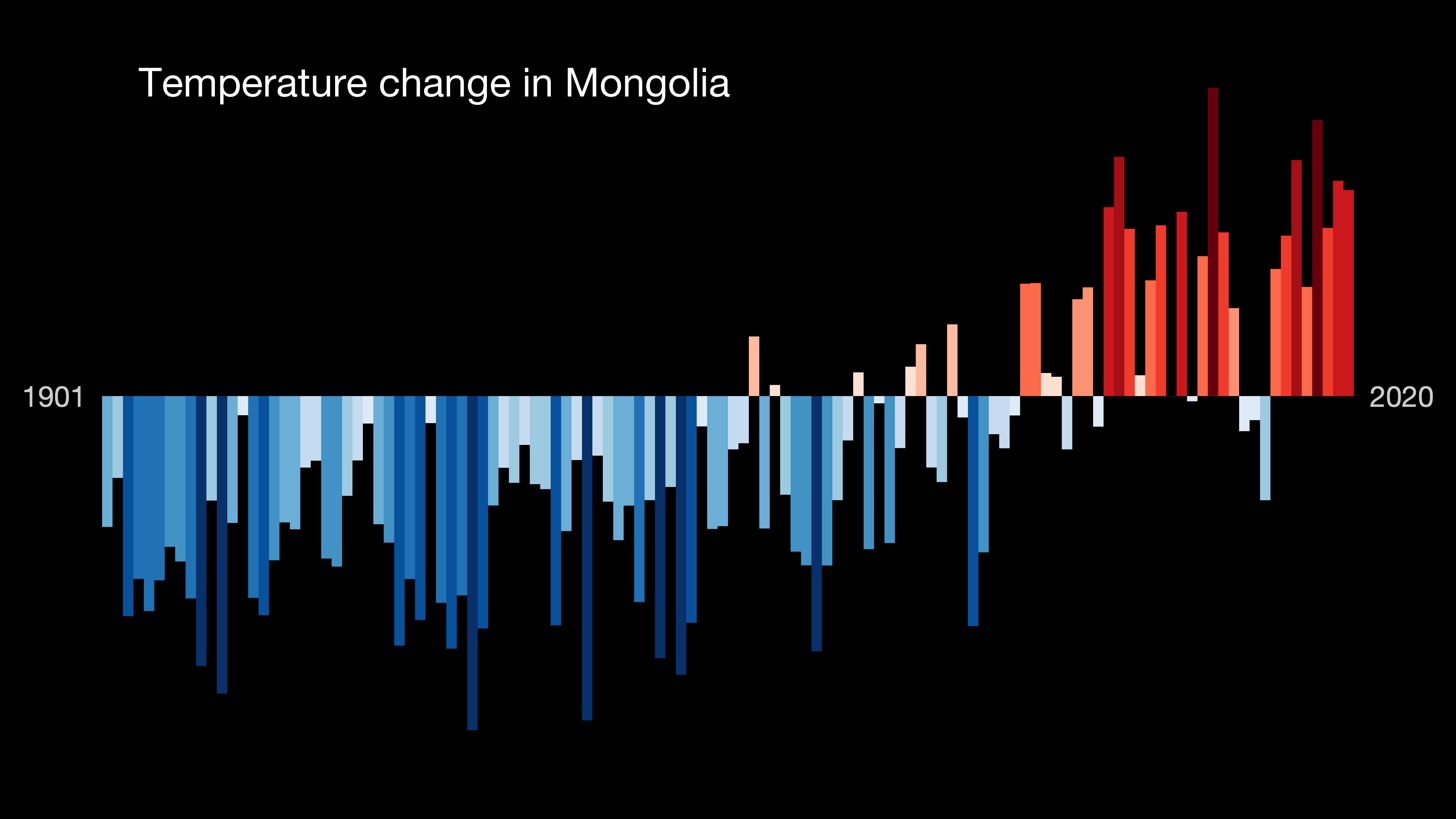
Visualisation of temperature change in Mongolia, 1901 to 2020.

Climate change has threatened the ways of life for traditional pastoralist herders, as it is a driving factor of disruptive dzuds and gans, also known as extreme climatic events or natural disasters. Winter storms, drought periods, and extreme temperatures have become more frequent. Leading up to 2000, there were approximately 20 extreme events per year, but since 2000, this number has doubled to 40 events per year. Between 2008 and 2010 Mongolia experienced 153 extreme events, most of which being strong winds, storms, and floods from run-off.

Since 1940, the average year wise temperature in Mongolia has increased by at least 1.8 °C. This temperature shift is deemed responsible for an increase in grassland aridity, and as a result, a lowering of the production of biomass. The Gobi desert is expected to creep northward at approximately 6–7 km / year, which is expected to further limit pastureland.

Another result of these meteorological shifts is expected to be precipitation that occurs in concentrated bursts and cannot be absorbed by the soil. The rising temperatures will also melt high mountain glaciers, degrade permafrost, and will cause more transpiration from plants.

Mongolia, specifically for Ulaanbaatar's vulnerable neighborhoods, is receiving help from the European Investment Bank in converting neighborhoods vulnerable to climate change into more climate-resilient and ecological districts. Plans call for constructing 10,000 houses in 20 environmentally friendly neighborhoods with easy access to businesses and nearby employment. Women-led families in Mongolia will have preferential access to this new green affordable housing, and 40% of workplaces and at least 40% of green mortgage loans will go to women-led companies.

In April 2024, Bloomberg reported that climate change is significantly impacting Mongolia, particularly through the increasing frequency of "dzud" events, with six occurrences in the last decade causing the loss of around 5.9 million animals, or 9% of the country's livestock. The nation has experienced a temperature rise of 2.5 °C over the past 80 years, exacerbating environmental degradation and economic challenges. Despite livestock production accounting for just 10% of GDP, it supports over 80% of the rural populace. The latest dzud event affected almost the entire country, resulting in a 7% increase in Mongolia's consumer price index and higher fodder costs, which also impact the vital cashmere industry. International and national initiatives are focusing on sustainable practices and renewable energy to mitigate these climate change effects.

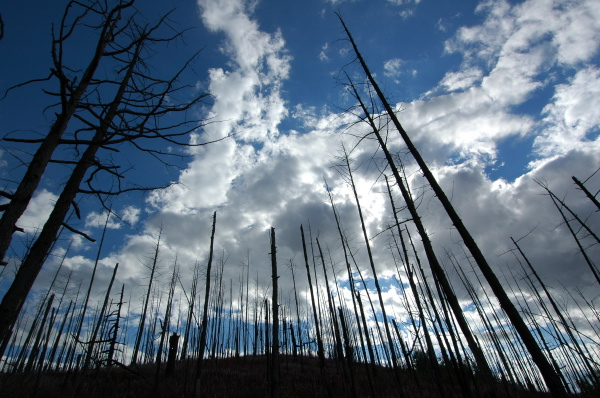
A forest in Mongolia, after a forest fire.

== Deforestation ==
Mongolia has low forest resources, and due to its harsh climate, the growth of its forests is slow. Nevertheless, the forests help maintain water conditions, prevent soil degradation, preserve permafrost, and control greenhouse gases and other harmful emissions. However, these limited forest resources have been diminishing due to logging, fires, pests, and disease.

By 2000, over 1.2 million ha of forested land had been invaded by pests. Due to the spread of pests, over 300,000 ha of forest was unable to grow.

Fires saw increased regularity due to carelessness of people who entered the forest (such as through escaped campfires, military activities, agricultural machinery), further deteriorating the forest cover. In 2008, 178 forest fires occurred, affecting 927,990 hectares of steppe and causing a 17.6 billion loss in tugriks.

Trees were also cut for use as fuel, amounting to a yearly 1.3 million cubic meters of wood a year. Additionally, the timber industry's poor logging techniques and inefficiency led to only 60% of the timber being used for profit.

The result of all of these factors, is that from 1980 to 2000, 10% of the forest cover in Mongolia was lost. This deforestation has caused lowering of groundwater levels, flash floods, and more desertification.

Three central pieces of legislation in dealing with this issue have been the "Law on Forests," the "Law on Protection of Forests and Steppe Fires," and the "Law on Levying Fees on the Harvest of Timber and Firewood." Together, these laws establish that 70% or more of income gained from timber harvest must be used for forest protection and restoration. These laws have been supplemented by other forest protection regulations and resolutions. Despite this, as of 2004, the reforestation rate hangs below 15%.

Mongolia had a 2018 Forest Landscape Integrity Index mean score of 9.36/10, ranking it 6th globally out of 172 countries.

=== Tree cover extent and loss ===
Global Forest Watch publishes annual estimates of tree cover loss and 2000 tree cover extent derived from time-series analysis of Landsat satellite imagery in the Global Forest Change dataset. In this framework, tree cover refers to vegetation taller than 5 m (including natural forests and tree plantations), and tree cover loss is defined as the complete removal of tree cover canopy for a given year, regardless of cause.

For Mongolia, country statistics report cumulative tree cover loss of 439,100 ha (4,391 km^{2}) from 2001 to 2024 (about 10.7% of its 2000 tree cover area). For tree cover density greater than 30%, country statistics report a 2000 tree cover extent of 4,090,459 ha (40,904.59 km^{2}). The charts and table below display this data. In simple terms, the annual loss number is the area where tree cover disappeared in that year, and the extent number shows what remains of the 2000 tree cover baseline after subtracting cumulative loss. Forest regrowth is not included in the dataset.

Annual tree cover loss in Mongolia, 2001–2024. View chart definition.
Tree cover extent in 2000 minus cumulative tree cover loss in Mongolia, 2001–2024 (loss-only residual; does not account for gain). View chart definition.

Annual tree cover extent and loss
| Year | Tree cover extent (km2) (Note: This residual measure does not include forest regrowth.) | Annual tree cover loss (km2) |
|---|---|---|
| 2001 | 40,694.02 | 210.57 |
| 2002 | 40,506.74 | 187.28 |
| 2003 | 40,122.41 | 384.33 |
| 2004 | 39,589.39 | 533.02 |
| 2005 | 39,514.72 | 74.67 |
| 2006 | 39,382.23 | 132.49 |
| 2007 | 38,901.41 | 480.82 |
| 2008 | 38,341.39 | 560.02 |
| 2009 | 37,523.47 | 817.92 |
| 2010 | 37,435.82 | 87.65 |
| 2011 | 37,400.31 | 35.51 |
| 2012 | 37,053.90 | 346.41 |
| 2013 | 37,047.61 | 6.29 |
| 2014 | 37,042.38 | 5.23 |
| 2015 | 36,970.93 | 71.45 |
| 2016 | 36,929.52 | 41.41 |
| 2017 | 36,677.13 | 252.39 |
| 2018 | 36,584.88 | 92.25 |
| 2019 | 36,556.73 | 28.15 |
| 2020 | 36,552.08 | 4.65 |
| 2021 | 36,550.21 | 1.87 |
| 2022 | 36,549.18 | 1.03 |
| 2023 | 36,540.78 | 8.40 |
| 2024 | 36,513.59 | 27.19 |

=== REDD+ forest reference level and monitoring ===
Mongolia has submitted a national forest reference level (FRL) under the UNFCCC REDD+ framework. The FRL is intended to support access to results-based payments and to help assess the forest sector’s contribution to Mongolia’s Nationally Determined Contribution under the Paris Agreement.

In its 2018 submission, Mongolia’s FRL covered emissions from “reducing emissions from deforestation” and “reducing emissions from forest degradation”, and removals from “enhancement of forest carbon stocks” (through afforestation/reforestation), for the historical reference period 2005–2015. The original submission reported an FRL of 5,165,536.8 t CO2 eq/year; following the UNFCCC technical assessment, Mongolia submitted a modified FRL of 3,477,384.2 t CO2 eq/year, mainly due to excluding the soil organic carbon pool (notably in peatland areas). The UNFCCC REDD+ web platform lists Mongolia’s national REDD+ strategy and assessed reference level as reported, while indicating that a national forest monitoring system and safeguards information had not been reported on the platform as of the 2018 submission.

== Desertification ==
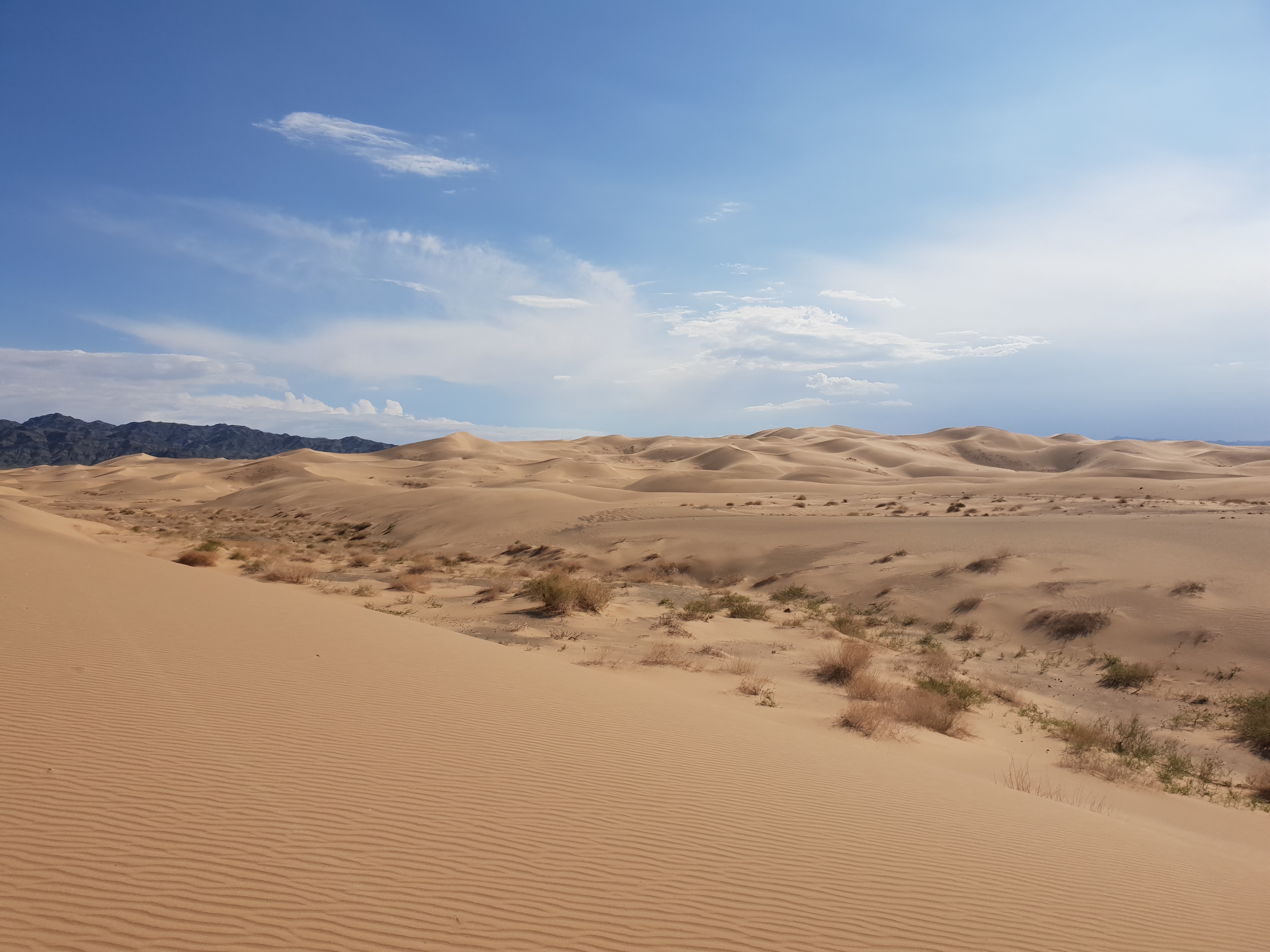
The Gobi Desert.

Desertification is defined as the process of fertile land becoming desert, and is characterized by loss of vegetation cover, increase of sand area, and drying-out of wetland areas. At least 90% of Mongolia's pastureland has experienced some level of desertification. Between 1996 and 2009 up to a third of rivers dried out or were impacted by drought conditions. It has been found that desertification is predominantly (approximately 87%) caused by human factors rather than natural factors. These anthropogenic factors include overgrazing of livestock, erosion of farmland soils, burning, and climate change.

In Mongolia, over 70% of pastureland is now degraded, and the vegetation growth rate has shrunken by a factor of 5. From 2007 to 2010 the forest covered area has decreased by 383,600 hectares.

The Mongolian government has created a National Committee to Combat Desertification and National Center to Combat Desertification. Between 1990 and 2001, the government has spent $24.6 million on 14 anti-desertification projects in Mongolia.

== Water scarcity ==
Mongolia has already consumed more than 40% of the water available. Mongolia's glaciers have shed more than a third of their surface area since 1990, and those sitting below 3,600m have lost roughly 70% over the same stretch. Permafrost—an enormous natural reservoir locked beneath much of the terrain—has contracted by 34% since the 1970s. The consequences are already on display in the capital, where 40% of Ulaanbaatar's residents have no piped water at home and 80% go without municipal sanitation.

Between 2007 and 2017, drought caused a significant share of Mongolia's rivers, springs, and lakes to dry up or disappear entirely. Over that period, 16% of all rivers, 22% of springs, and 28% of lakes and ponds were lost.

== Loss of biodiversity ==
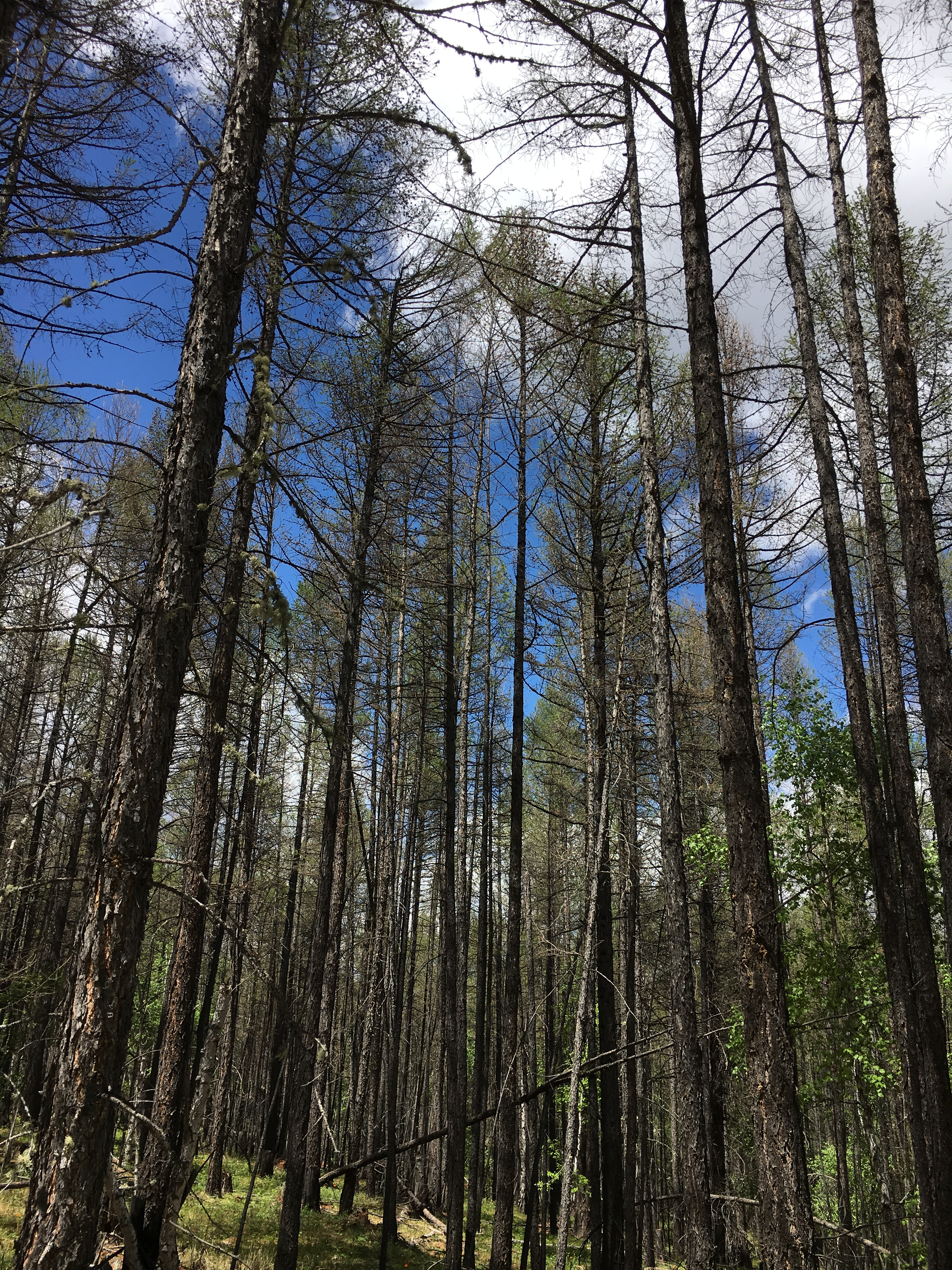
Larix sibirica trees experiencing defoliation as a result of Siberian silk moth caterpillars, Terelj National Park.

Mongolia supports an innate biodiversity, owing to its unique and often undisturbed ecosystems. It has some of the last populations of the world's endangered species, and has many species that can only be found within it. However, Mongolia's biodiversity is threatened by its growing population and demand for natural resources. These pressures bring on activities such as farming, mining, and hunting in previously undisturbed areas.

Wildlife are hunted and harvested in a variety of ways, including direct use of meat and animal products, and commercial marketing of these animals. There are large-scale harvests of both gazelles and fish for commercial use. Another phenomenon is the harvest of rare and valuable animals by foreign hunters who carry special licenses.

Scientist and environmentalist Lkhagvasumberel Tumursukh (1988-2015) fought against miners around the Tost, Tosonbumbi range to protect the environment and preserve the biodiversity of the area. After multiple attacks on his life, T. Lkhagvasümberel was found dead in November 2015.

The Mongolian government has taken steps to address the issue of biodiversity loss. As of 2002, there are 11 protected land areas in Mongolia. The government has also passed The Mongolian Law on Environmental Protection (1995) which includes ecological training, compensation for environmental damage, economic incentives for environmental protection, and NGO participation in protection. Other notable laws include the Mongolian Law on Hunting (1995) that regulates the protection and proper use of hunted animals, The Mongolian Law on Natural Plants (1995) that regulates protection and restoration of plants, and The Law on Water (1995), which protects water reserves and quality.

== Pollution ==
=== Air pollution ===
==== Indoor air pollution ====
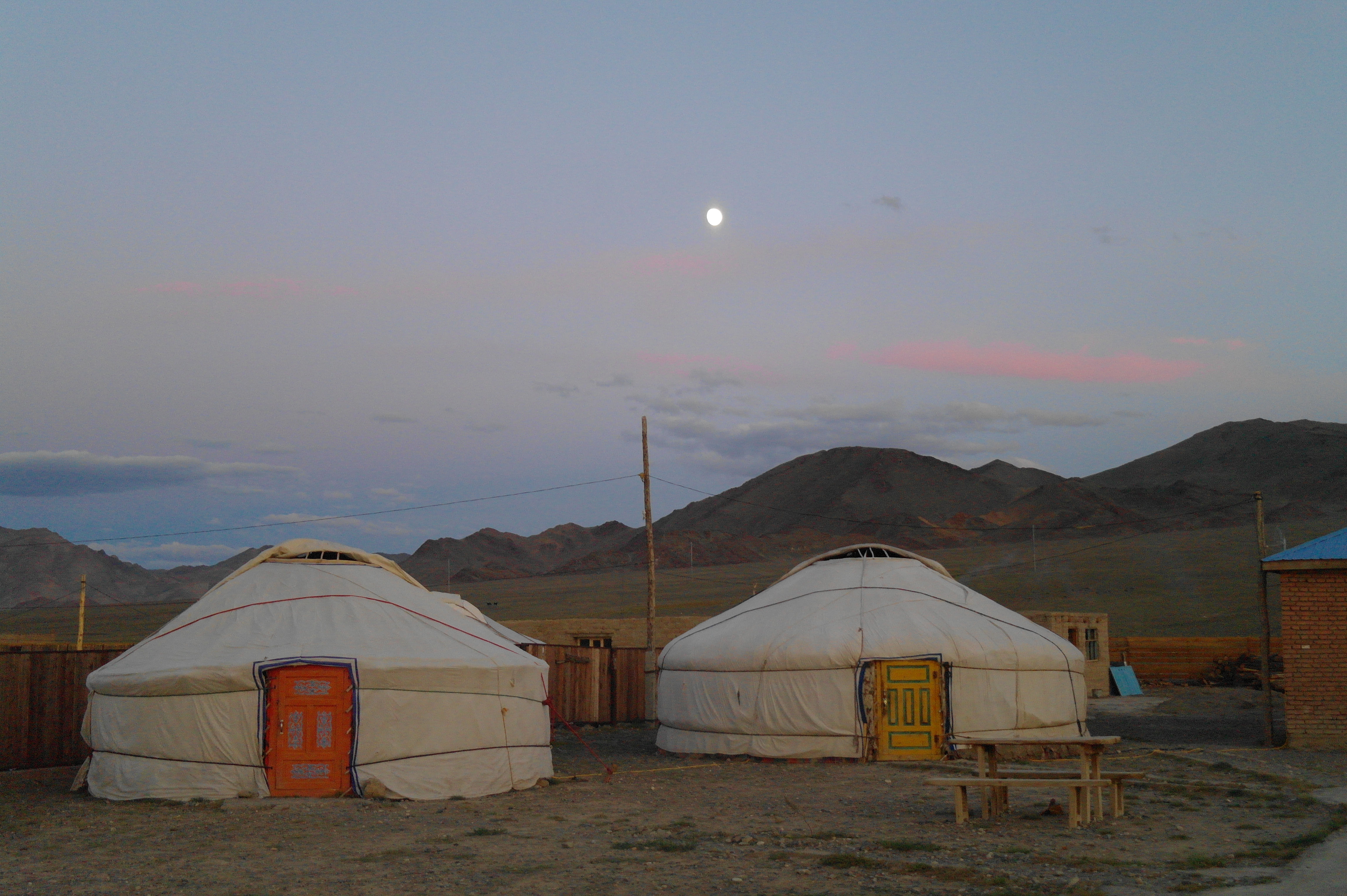
Mongolian gers, such as those pictured here, experience indoor air pollution.

Indoor air pollution is a problem in Mongolia, due to the burning of coal and biomass as fuels within homes, and improper ventilation. Because of Mongolia's very cold winters (that have temperatures averaging below 0 from November to March) and often cold nights, Mongolians need a lot of energy for heating in addition to the energy needed for cooking. In the gers (traditional Mongolian dwellings), coal is the most used form of fuel, and the burning of coal and other biomass (such as wood, crop residue etc.) in simple stoves causes the air within the living spaces to have elevated levels of carbon monoxide and particulate matter. In rare cases, people die of smoke build up and mismanaging of ventilation.

==== Urban air pollution ====
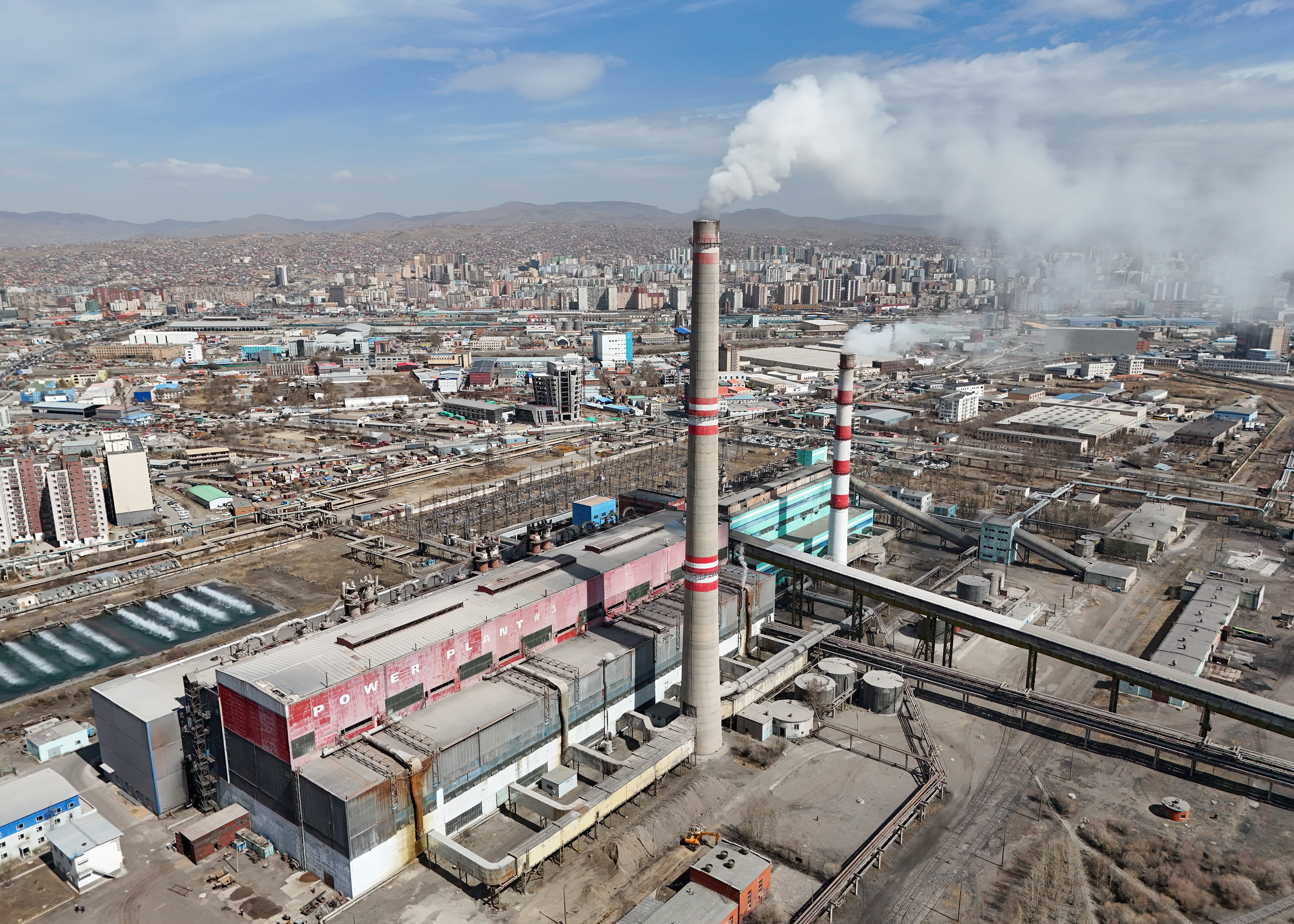
Coal plants contribute extreme amounts of pollution

Air pollution is a problem in Mongolia's cities, especially in Ulaanbaatar, the largest and most densely populated city in Mongolia. The pollution in Ulaanbaatar comes from the emissions of vehicles, power plants, gers, and other industrial activity.

From 1995 to 2002, the number of vehicles in Ulaanbaatar more than doubled. Approximately 80% of vehicles in the city do not meet emission or fuel efficiency standards. This results in vehicles adding 70 tons of pollutants to the air every year. The major rise of automobiles in the city has corresponded with increasing levels of nitrogen dioxide.

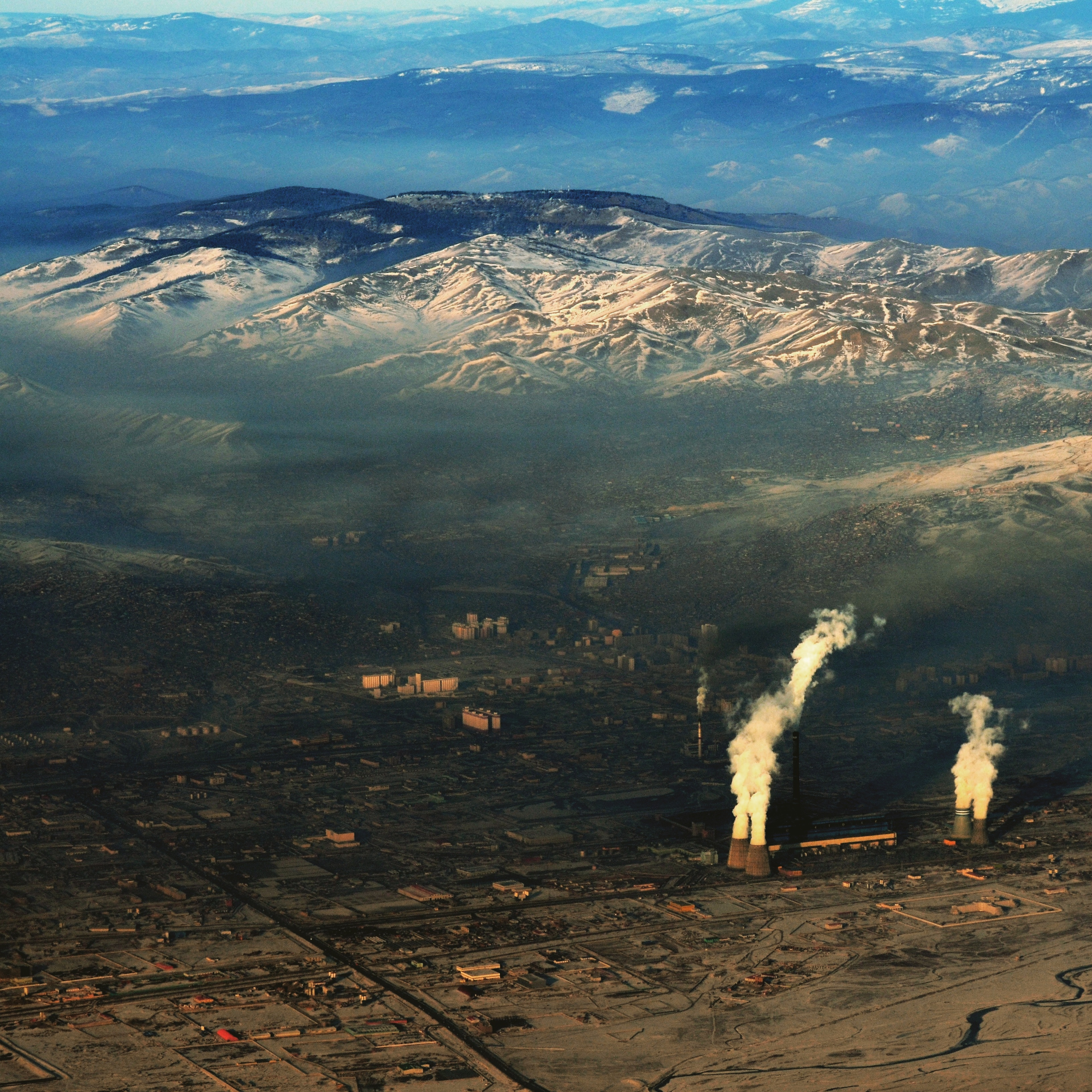
Aerial view of smog covering Ulaanbaatar in the winter of 2016

During the cold season, there is an increased use of energy for heating purposes, and as a result increased levels of air pollution. During the winter, the three diesel power plants in Ulaanbaatar release 4.5 million cubic meters of gaseous pollutants. There are also many coal-fired power plants in Ulaanbaatar. Over 250 steam boilers burn 400,000 tons of coal every year, and gers and houses with manual heating burn over 200,000 cubic meters of fuel wood every year. Suspended particulate matter, (caused by dust storms and pollution) has been shown to peak in winter months. Daily averages of particulate concentration in the air can range from two-to-three times higher than international standards. Particulate concentrations have been shown to correlate with premature death. In the cold seasons, the atmospheric content of carbon monoxide is 2–4 times the permissible amount and acute respiratory diseases (such as tuberculosis and other lung diseases) are reported to be higher during winter as well.

A grassroots movement has emerged, as evidenced by a parliamentary petition with 71,000 signatures, calling for accountability regarding air pollution levels in Mongolia, which exceed World Health Organization guidelines by 27 times on the coldest days.

Efforts to address air pollution in Ulaanbaatar include the implementation of carbon credit mechanisms. These initiatives aim to incentivize renewable energy production and reduce carbon emissions, contributing to the mitigation of the city's severe air quality issues.

=== Water pollution ===
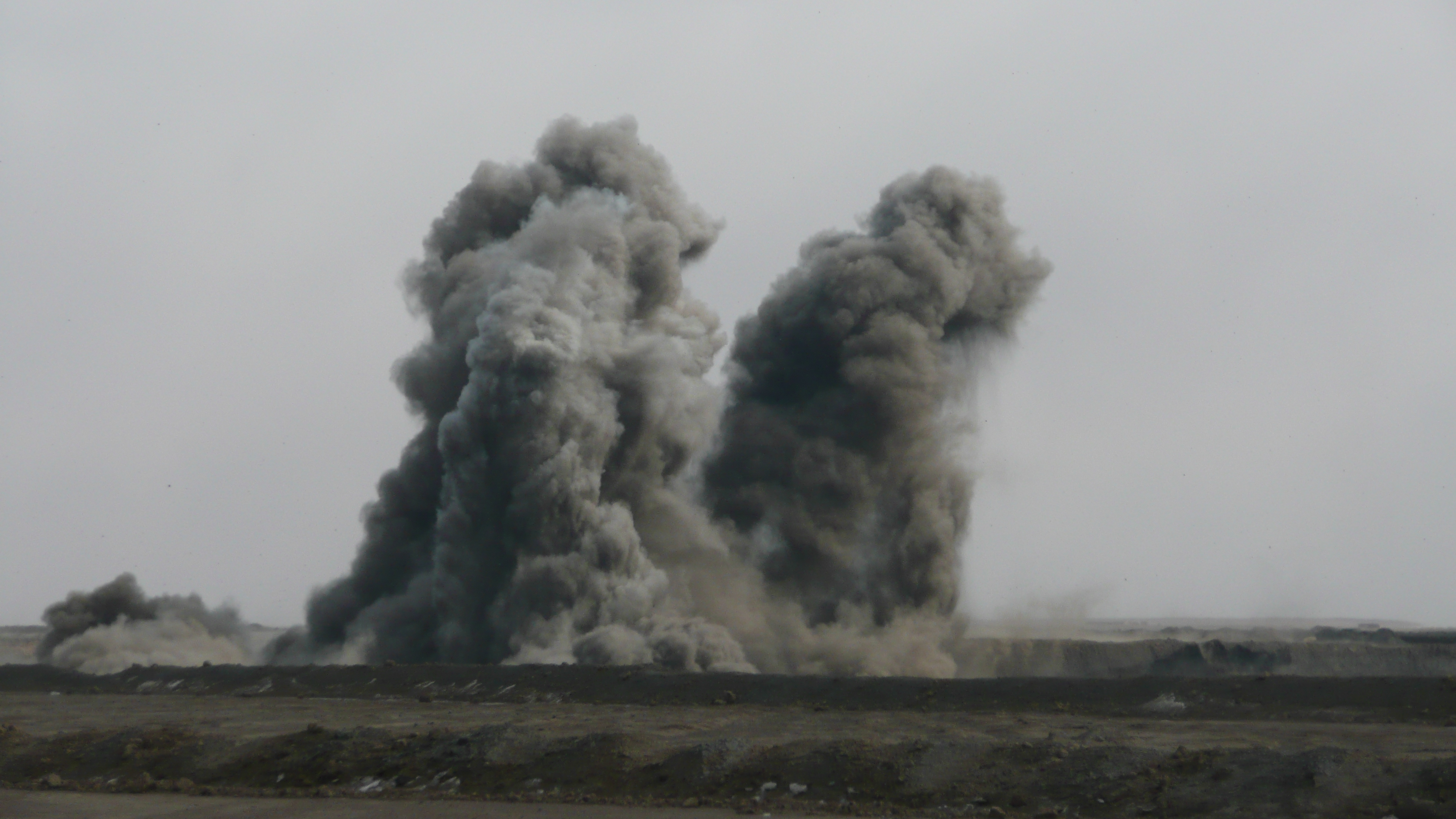
Air pollution from Tavan Tolgoi coal mine.

Mongolia's mining industry is linked with water pollution issues. After the collapse of the Soviet Union in 1991, the Mongolian Government initiated policies that allowed the mining industry to operate with relatively few regulations, for the purpose of economic growth. The new Mineral Law of 1997, enacted after the right-of-center Democratic Union came to power in 1996, served to liberalize the mining industry by weakening the restrictions for gaining mining license and allowing for foreign ownership of mining enterprises. Subsequently, mining, and especially gold mining which makes up 60% of the industry, has experienced significant growth. From 1991 to 2001 production of gold increased 17-fold. However, this growth has caused environmental concerns, one of the main being water pollution. Mining deposits of cyanide, sulfuric acid, and other toxins are often found in river basins and headwaters. Inefficient use of large quantities of water for the purposes of extracting gold has caused further pollution and the drying up of streams. Mining has been identified as the cause of pollution in 28 rivers and streams. Additionally, the state has a weak site monitoring system.

As a backlash to the effects of mining on water quality, the Ongi River Movement formed in 2001. Its goal was to protect the Ongi River and prevent further degradation. The group participated in grassroots organizing activities and succeeded in stopping 36 out of 37 mining licenses issued along the Ongi River. The Ongi River Movement joined with other River Movements in 2006 to form the Homeland and Water Protection Coalition. The HWPC dissolved in 2008 due to internal disagreements, but the organization set the precedent for how local activists can create national change in Mongolia. One of the groups that arose after the HWPC was the United Movement of Mongolian Rivers and Lakes. This group was instrumental in winning the passage of a law that prohibited mining at the headwater of rivers.

Water pollution can also be linked to non-treated and semi-treated human and industrial waste discharge. Annually over 120 million cubic meters of waste waster is disposed of without treatment.

== See also ==
- Hydrogen internal combustion engine vehicle
- Biomass power station
- Clean coal technology and carbon capture
- BioDME: low-pollution fuel for diesel generators
- Chimney filters and afterburners: may reduce PM emissions
- Lkhagvasumberel Tumursukh, a persumably murdered environmental activisit
