= Marshall Zhukov House Museum =

Museum in Bayanzürkh, Ulaanbaatar, Mongolia

- Mongolian: Маршал Г.К.Жуковын гэр музей Russian: Дом-музей маршала Г.К.Жукова
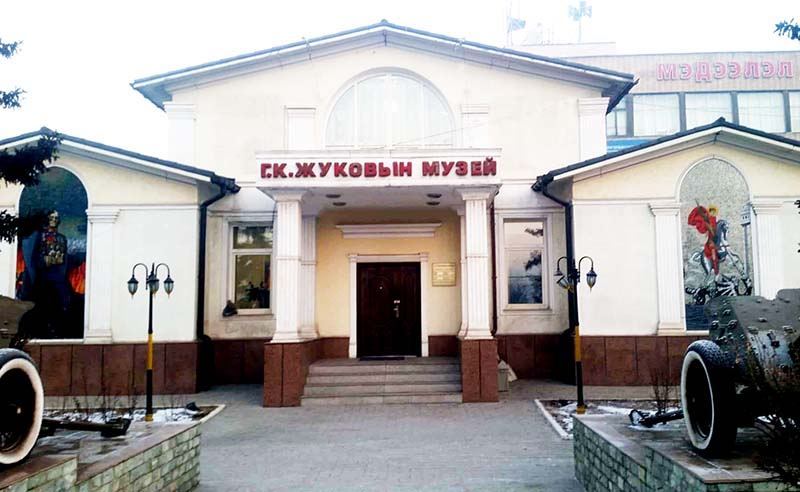
- Established: 19 August 1979
- Location: Bayanzürkh, Ulaanbaatar, Mongolia
- Coordinates: 47.918009°N 106.953004°E
- Type: Military museum
- Owner: Mongolian Military Museum

The Marshall Zhukov House Museum (Mongolian: Маршал Г.К.Жуковын гэр музей, Russian: Дом-музей маршала Г.К.Жукова), also referred to as Marshall Zhukov Memorial Museum (Mongolian: Маршал Г.К.Жуковын дурсгалын музей, Russian: Мемориальный музей маршала Г.К.Жукова), is a museum commemorating Marshal Georgy Zhukov in Bayanzürkh, Ulaanbaatar, the capital city of Mongolia.

== Location ==
The museum is located in an area of Bayanzürkh district in Ulaanbaatar, where formerly many Russians and Soviet citizens resided.

== History ==
The museum building was constructed in 1930. Soviet commander Georgy Zhukov resided in the building with his family between September 1939 and May 1940, during the Battles of Khalkhin Gol between Soviet-Mongolian allied forces and the invading Japanese Kwantung Army. The four-month-long border clash concluded with a decisive Soviet-Mongolian victory over the Japanese. Zhukov later became Marshal of the Soviet Union in 1943; Hero of the Soviet Union in 1940, 1944, 1945, and 1956; and Hero of the Mongolian People's Republic in 1969.

The museum was established in the former house of Zhukov on 19 August 1979, during the 40th anniversary of the Battles of Khalkhin Gol. In 1990, the museum became an affiliate of the Mongolian Military Museum.

The museum underwent renovation by the Embassy of Russia in Ulaanbaatar and was reopened in February 2007.

== Architecture ==
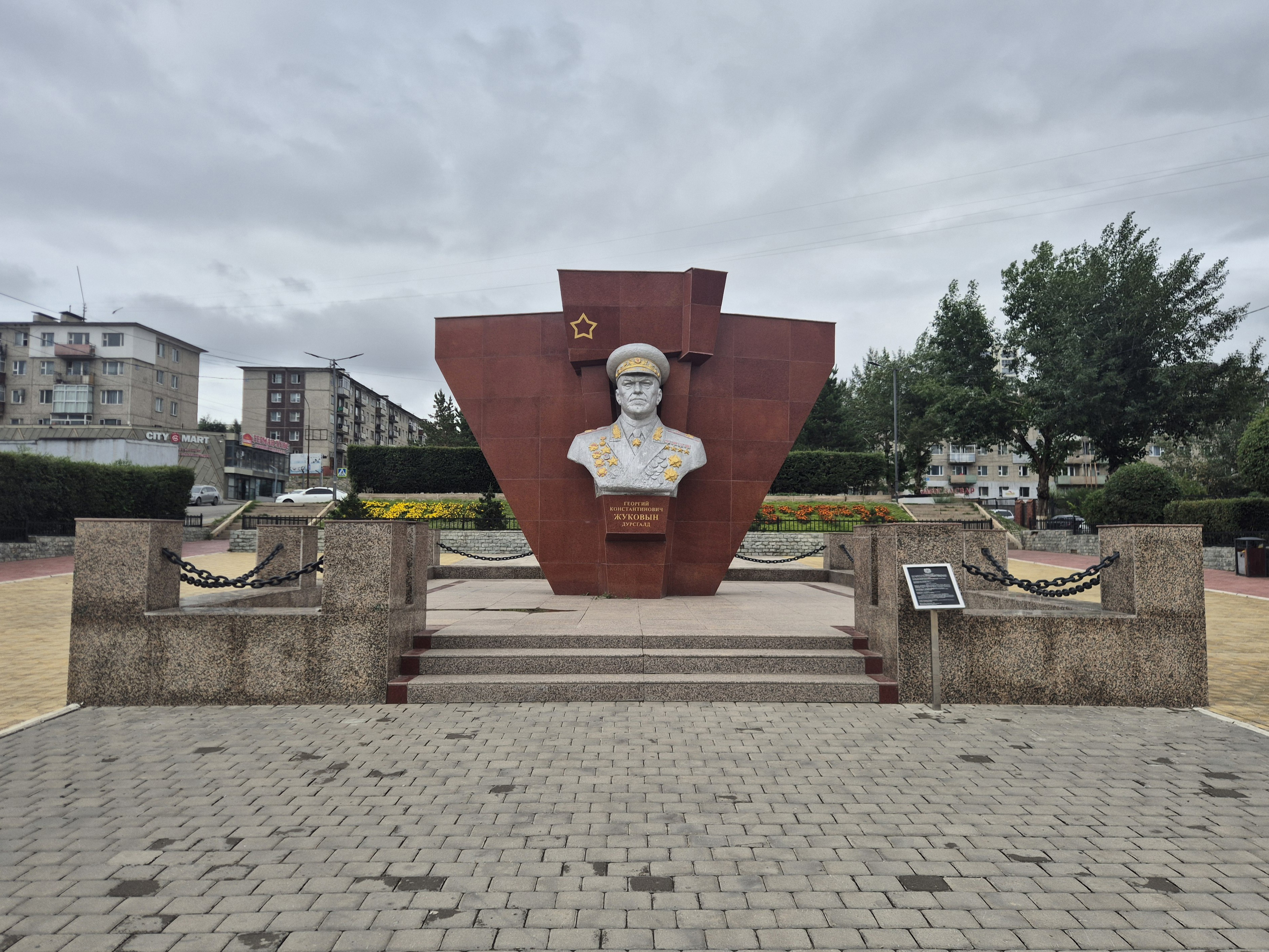
Monument to Georgy Zhukov

Two small cannons are present in the garden in front of the museum building. The sides of the museum entrance feature two mosaics: one depicting a 1974 portrait of Marshal Zhukov by artist Konstantin Vasilyev and one depicting the legend of Saint George slaying a dragon. Upon entering, a marble slab bears the inscription "Georgy Zhukov lived and worked in this house 1939-1940."

A monument to Zhukov stands in the square to the west of the museum. The monument, sculpted by S.Dorjpalam, was erected in 1984 and became the first statue dedicated to the Marshal. The first statue of Zhukov in Russia was erected in the Red Square during the 50th Victory Day parades in 1995.

== Exhibitions ==
The museum exhibits artifacts from the Central Museum of the Russian Ministry of Defense and the Mongolian Military Museum. Exhibits include maps, weapons, and uniforms used at Khalkhin Gol, along with some of Zhukov's belongings, such as medal-adorned uniforms, paintings, and photos taken during the battle. A diorama also shows the battlefield's layout with the Soviet command center and models of the aircraft and tanks used during the offensive. There is also an upstairs office with a desk where Zhukov himself once sat.

== See also ==
- List of museums in Mongolia
- Georgy Zhukov
- Battles of Khalkhin Gol
