= Shargaljuut, Bayankhongor =

Town in Erdenetsogt, Bayankhongor, Mongolia

Coordinates: 46°19′57″N 101°13′34″E

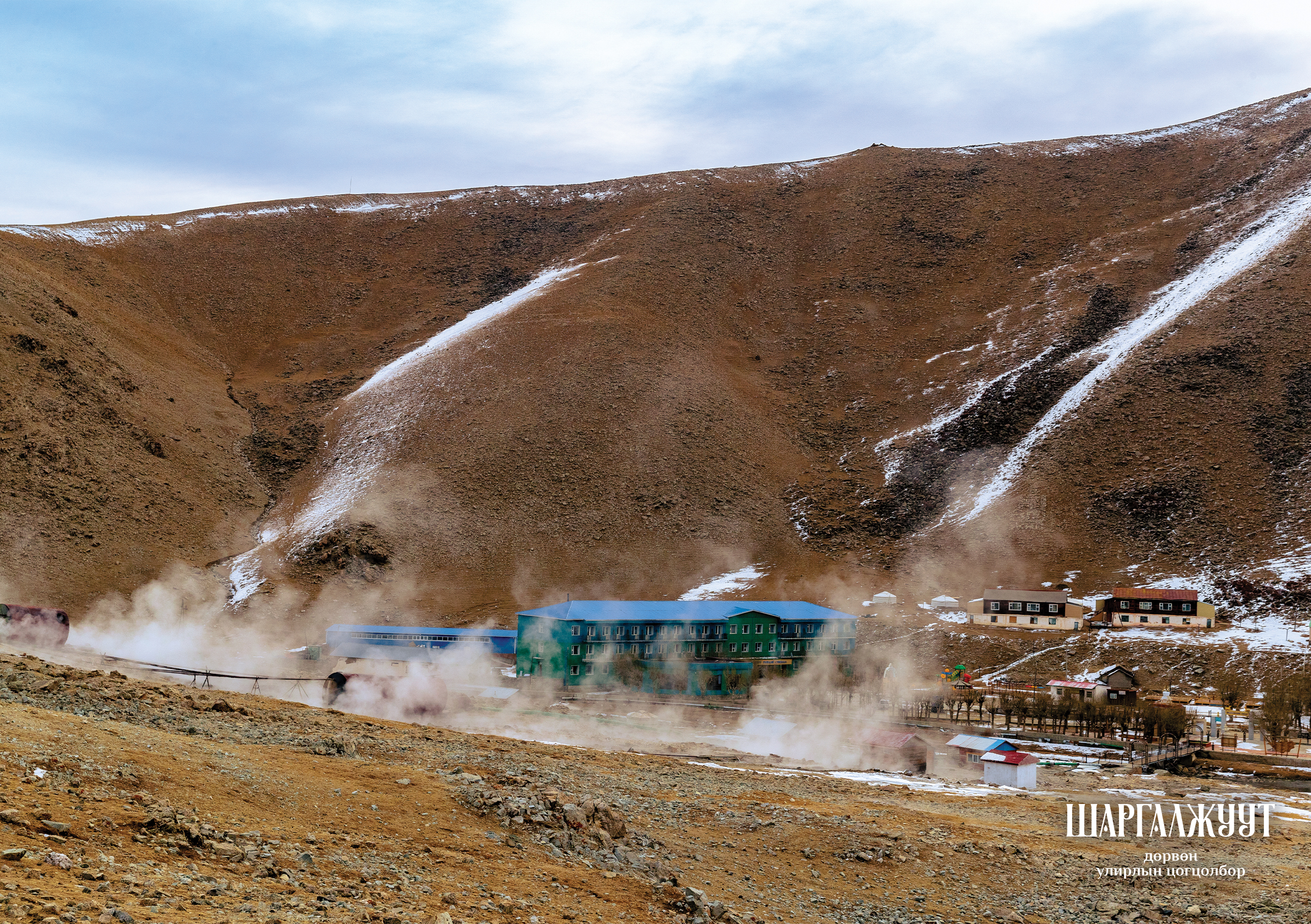
Shargaljuut

Shargaljuut (Mongolian: Шаргалжуут, ᠰᠢᠷᠭᠠᠯᠵᠤᠤᠲᠤ) is an urban-type settlement geographically located in the Erdenetsogt sum (district) of Bayankhongor Province in Mongolia. Officially Shargaljuut is a bag under Bayankhongor city jurisdiction, but situated 54 km NE from the city on Shargaljuut river in Khangai Mountains at 2136 m elevation.

Shargaljuut population is 1,444 (est.end of 2006) and is the second largest settlement of Bayankhongor Province after Bayankhongor city proper.

Shargaljuut is a resort with a number of hot (up to +95°C) mineral springs, some of them with sulfur mud.

== See also ==
- Shargaljuut Hot Spring
