= Khashaat =

District in Arkhangai Province, Mongolia

Coordinates: 47°27′05″N 103°09′04″E

Khashaat District Хашаат сум ᠬᠠᠰᠢᠶ᠋ᠠᠲᠤᠰᠤᠮᠤ
- District
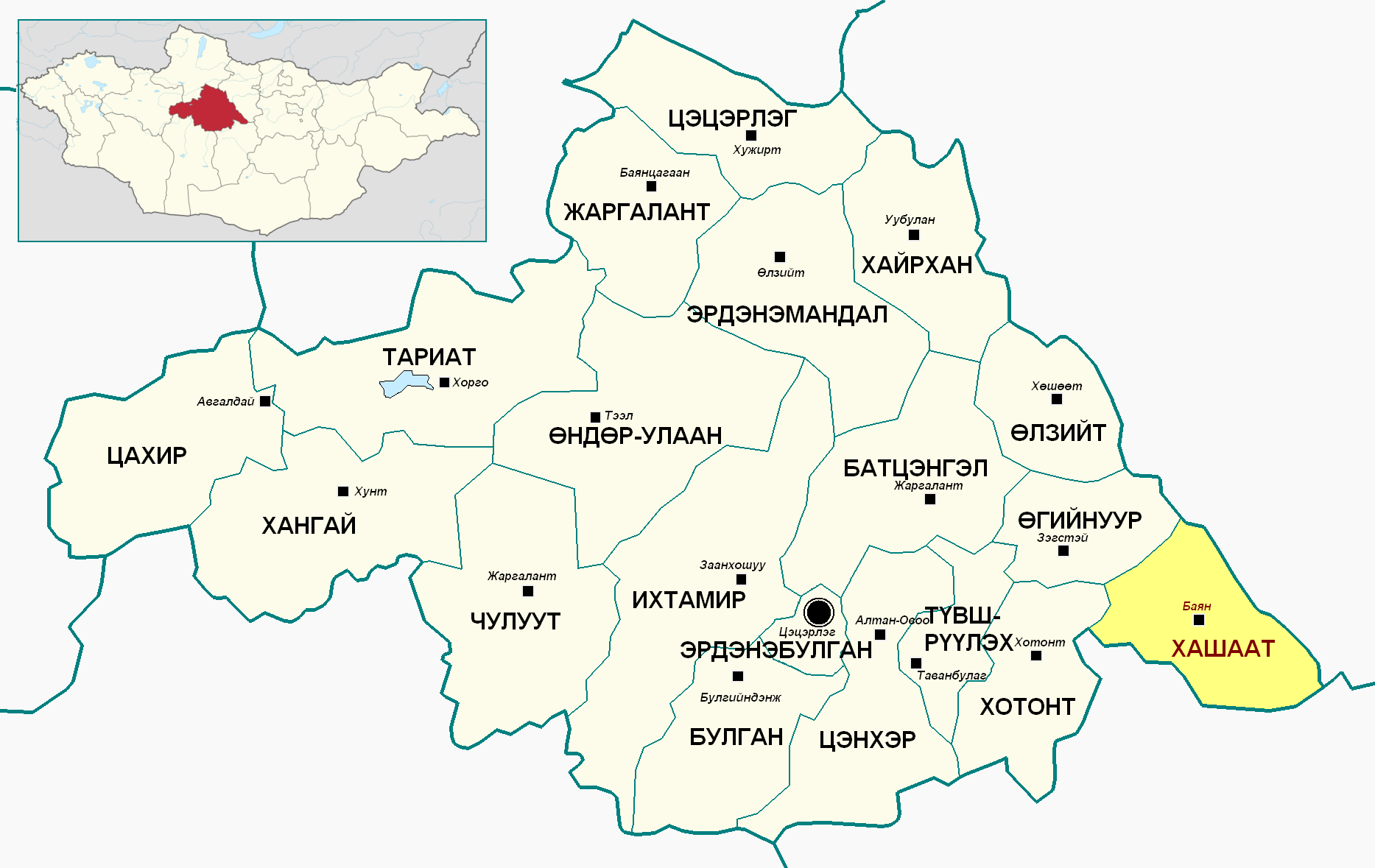
- Khashaat District in Arkhangai Province
- Country: Mongolia
- Province: Arkhangai Province

Area
  - Total: 2,600 km^{2} (1,000 sq mi)
- Time zone: UTC+8 (UTC + 8)

Khashaat (Mongolian: Хашаат, "fenced") is a sum (district) of Arkhangai Province in central Mongolia. The economy is based on herding. Khashaat is primarily known for several monuments left by an ancient Turkic empire. Khashaat's terrain is steppe, with no woodland, unlike many other sums in Arkhangai.

== Geography ==
The sum is located at the eastern most part of the province.

== Administrative divisions ==
The district is divided into five bags, which are:

- Bayan
- Jargalant
- Nomgon
- Tsagaan khad
- Tsaidam

== Tourist attractions ==
- Göktürk Museum

== July 2014 tornado ==
A violent F4 stovepipe tornado struck the Nomgon area on the evening of July 26, 2014. One person was killed, while 4 others were injured. A few homes were levelled, trees were uprooted, and a car was thrown for 10 feet (3 meters). This was the first tornado in Mongolia since 1974.
