= Museum of Selenge Province =

Museum in Altanbulag, Selenge, Mongolia

- Сэлэнгэ Аймгийн Нэгдсэн Музей
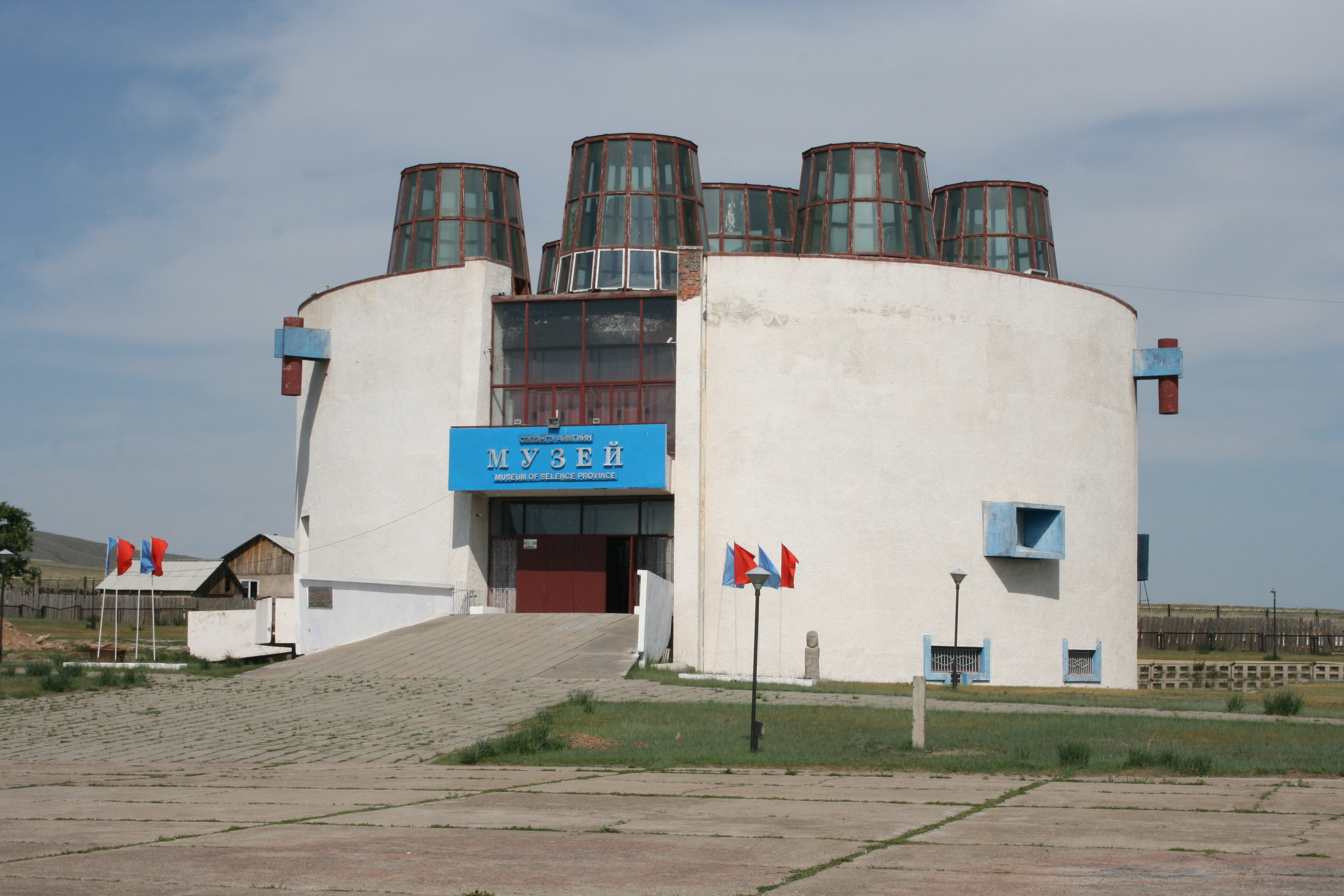
- Established: 1948
- Location: Altanbulag, Selenge, Mongolia
- Coordinates: 50°19′09.6″N 106°29′58.3″E
- Type: museum

The Museum of Selenge Province (Mongolian: Сэлэнгэ Аймгийн Нэгдсэн Музей) is a museum in Altanbulag, Selenge Province, Mongolia.

== History ==
The museum was originally established in 1948. In 1968, it was updated to a local museum. In 2004, the museum was merged with Museum of Altanbulag. In January 2023, the museum underwent renovation.

== Exhibitions ==
The museum exhibits artifacts related to nature, ethnography and objects related to Selenge Province. The museum also exhibits history of Mongolian Revolution of 1921.

== See also ==
- List of museums in Mongolia
