= Zuunmod =

Town in Töv, Mongolia

Zuunmod District Зуунмод сум ᠵᠠᠭᠤᠨᠮᠣᠳᠤᠰᠤᠮᠤ
- District
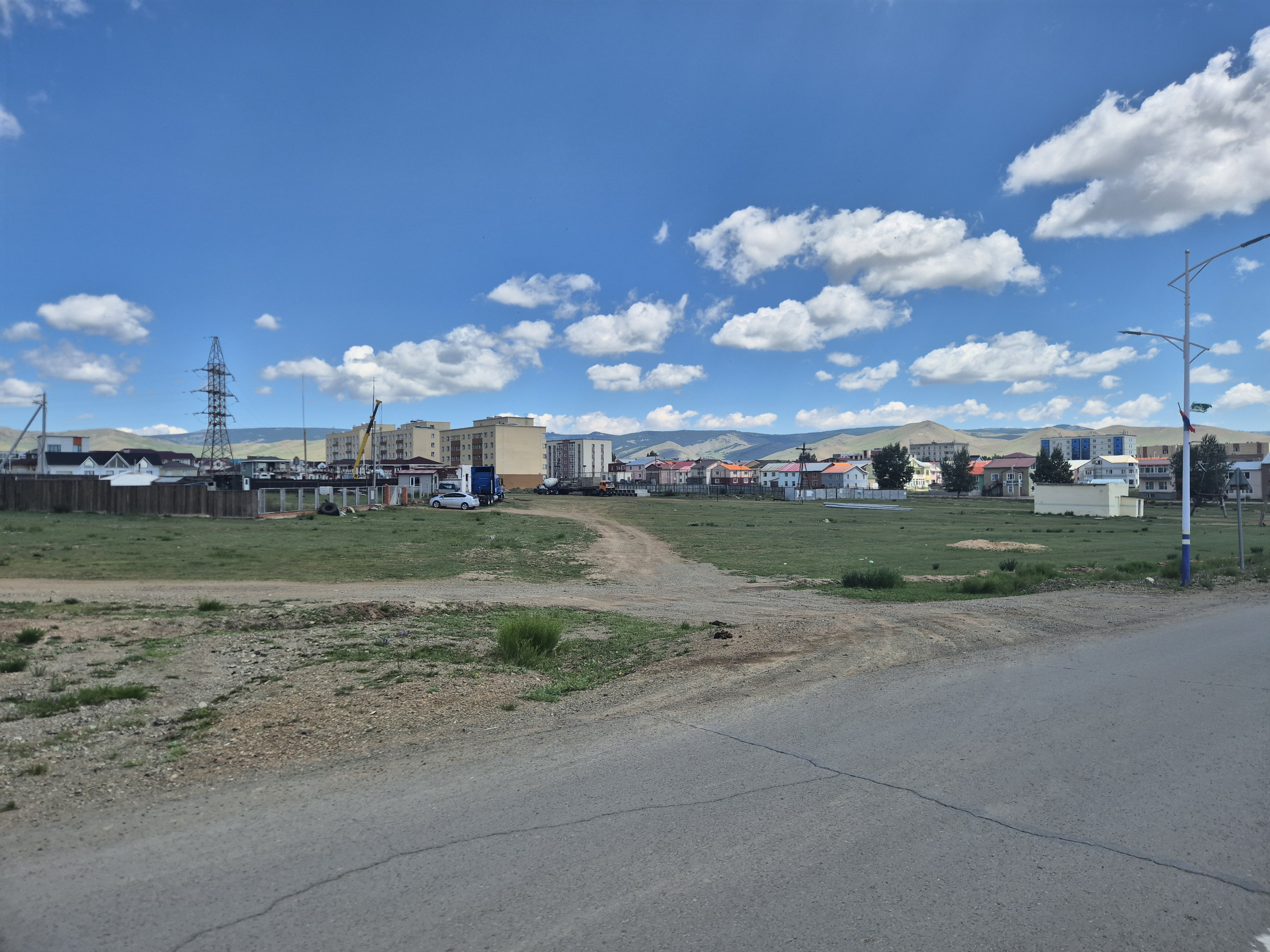
- Zuunmod centre

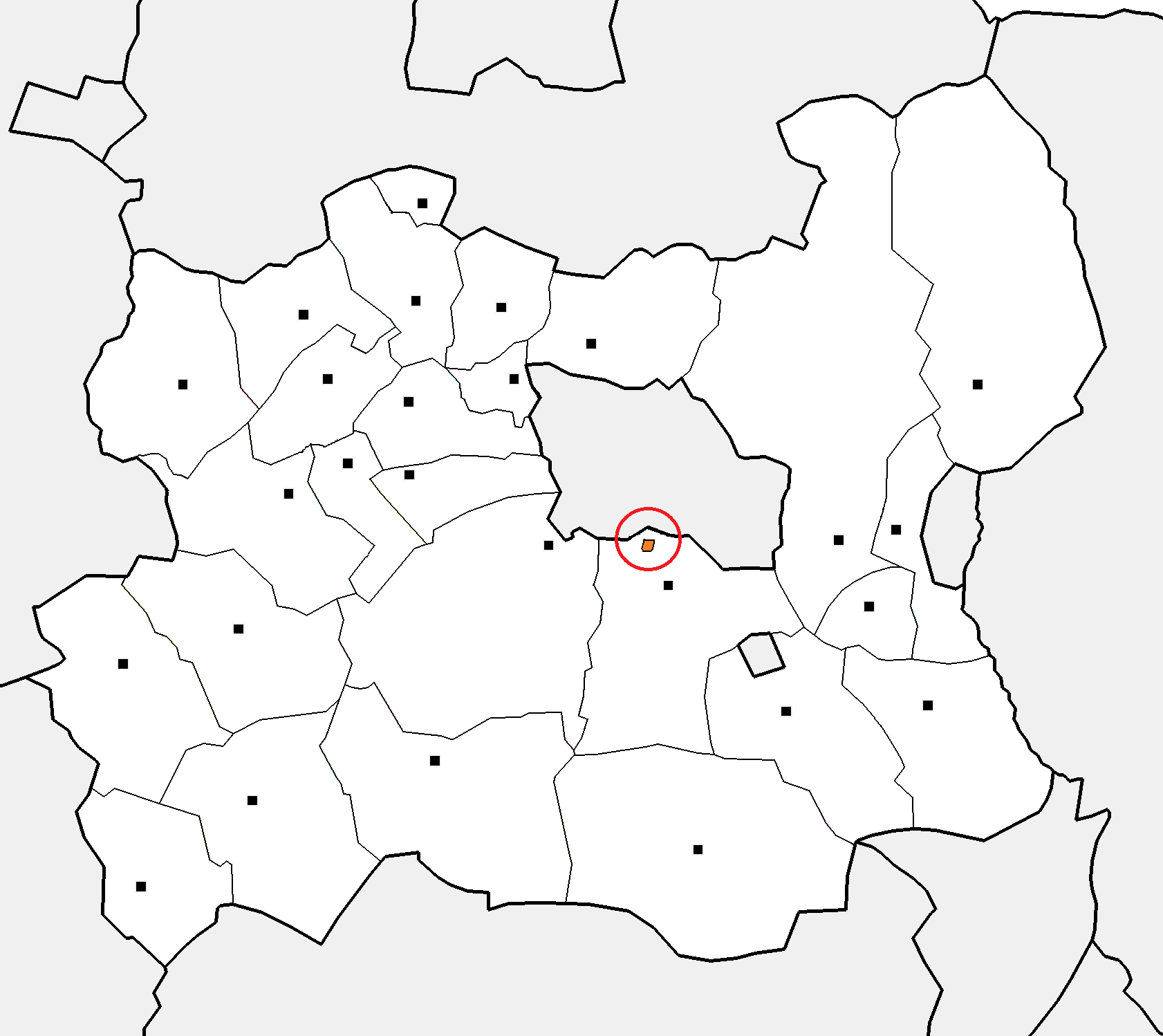
- Zuunmod District in Töv Province

- Location within Mongolia
- Coordinates: 47°42′25″N 106°56′58″E
- Country: Mongolia
- Province: Töv Province

Area
  - Total: 19.18 km^{2} (7.41 sq mi)
- Elevation: 1,530 m (5,020 ft)

Population (2018)
  - Total: 17,261
  - Density: 899.9/km^{2} (2,331/sq mi)
- Time zone: UTC+8 (UTC + 8)
- Area code: +976 (0) 272

Zuunmod (/ˈzuːnmɒd/ ZOON-mod) (Note: Mongolian: Зуунмод [t͡sʊ́ːɴmɔ̽t]; lit. 'A Hundred Trees') is the administrative seat of Mongolia's Töv Province. As of the 2017 census, it had a population of 16,953 and an area of 19.18 km². Zuunmod is located on the south side of Bogd Khan Mountain, 43 kilometres (27 mi) south of the capital city of Ulaanbaatar. Zuunmod was established as the administrative center of Töv Province in 1942. Until that time, the administration of the aimag had been located in Ulaanbaatar.

The significant Battle of Jao Modo took place here in early May 1649, ending with the victory for the Qing dynasty.

== Administrative divisions ==
The district is divided into six bags, which are:

- Baruun Zuunmod (Баруун Зуунмод)
- Bayankhoshuu (Баянхошуу)
- Lans (Ланс)
- Natsagdorj (Нацагдорж)
- Nomt (Номт)
- Züündelger (Зүүндэлгэр)

== Livestock ==
In 2004, Zuunmod officially had roughly 24,000 head of livestock, among them 8,500 goats, 12,000 sheep, 2,000 cattle, about as many horses, and no camels.

== Climate ==
Zuunmod has a dry-winter subarctic climate (Köppen Dwc).

Climate data for Zuunmod, 1981–2010
Month	Jan	Feb	Mar	Apr	May	Jun	Jul	Aug	Sep	Oct	Nov	Dec	Year
Mean daily maximum °C (°F)	−14.2 (6.4)	−10.3 (13.5)	−2.5 (27.5)	7.9 (46.2)	16.1 (61.0)	21.0 (69.8)	22.9 (73.2)	20.7 (69.3)	15.1 (59.2)	6.0 (42.8)	−5.2 (22.6)	−11.9 (10.6)	5.5 (41.8)
Mean daily minimum °C (°F)	−24.9 (−12.8)	−21.8 (−7.2)	−14.4 (6.1)	−5.4 (22.3)	2.2 (36.0)	8.2 (46.8)	11.3 (52.3)	9.2 (48.6)	2.4 (36.3)	−5.8 (21.6)	−15.9 (3.4)	−22.4 (−8.3)	−6.4 (20.4)
Average precipitation mm (inches)	2.5 (0.10)	2.5 (0.10)	4.4 (0.17)	7.0 (0.28)	18.9 (0.74)	49.0 (1.93)	73.4 (2.89)	74.3 (2.93)	26.1 (1.03)	9.4 (0.37)	5.7 (0.22)	2.8 (0.11)	276 (10.87)
Average precipitation days	6.0	6.0	8.2	8.6	8.6	13.9	17.0	15.3	8.7	7.1	8.2	7.6	115.2
Source: World Meteorological Organization

== Tourist attractions ==
- Museum of Töv Province

== Notable residents ==
- Ganzorigiin Mandakhnaran, Mongolian wrestler

== Gallery ==
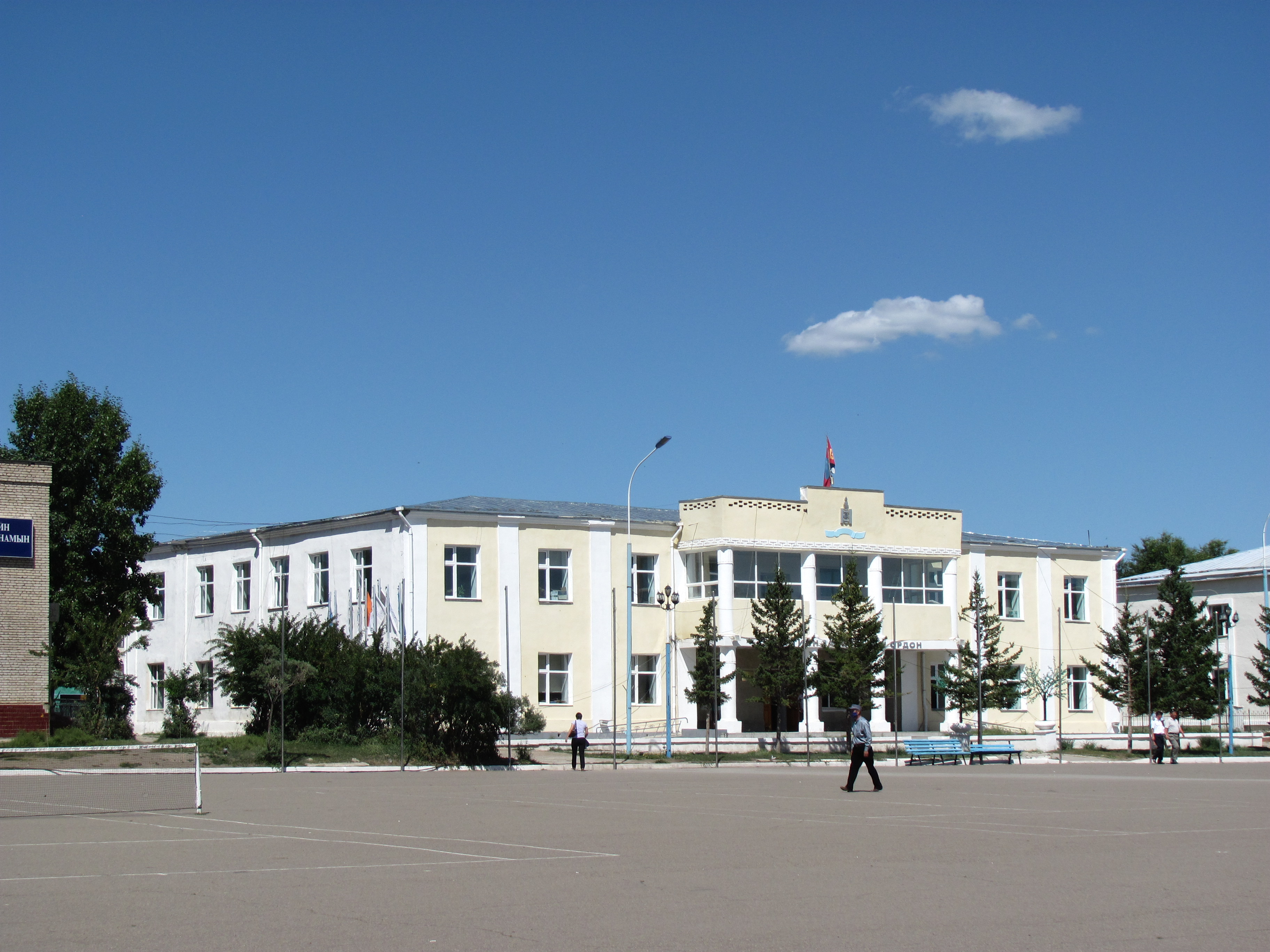
Zuunmod Town Hall

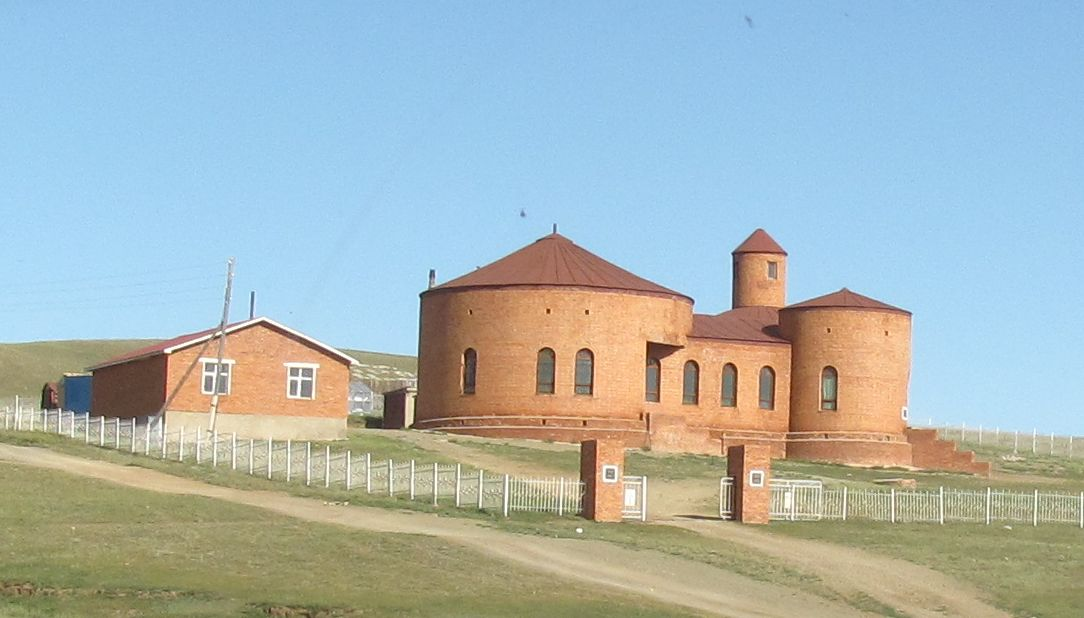
Zuunmod church
