= Khalkhgol =

District in Dornod Province, Mongolia

Khalkhgol District Халхгол сум ᠬᠠᠯᠬ᠎ᠠᠭᠣᠣᠯᠰᠤᠮᠤ
- District
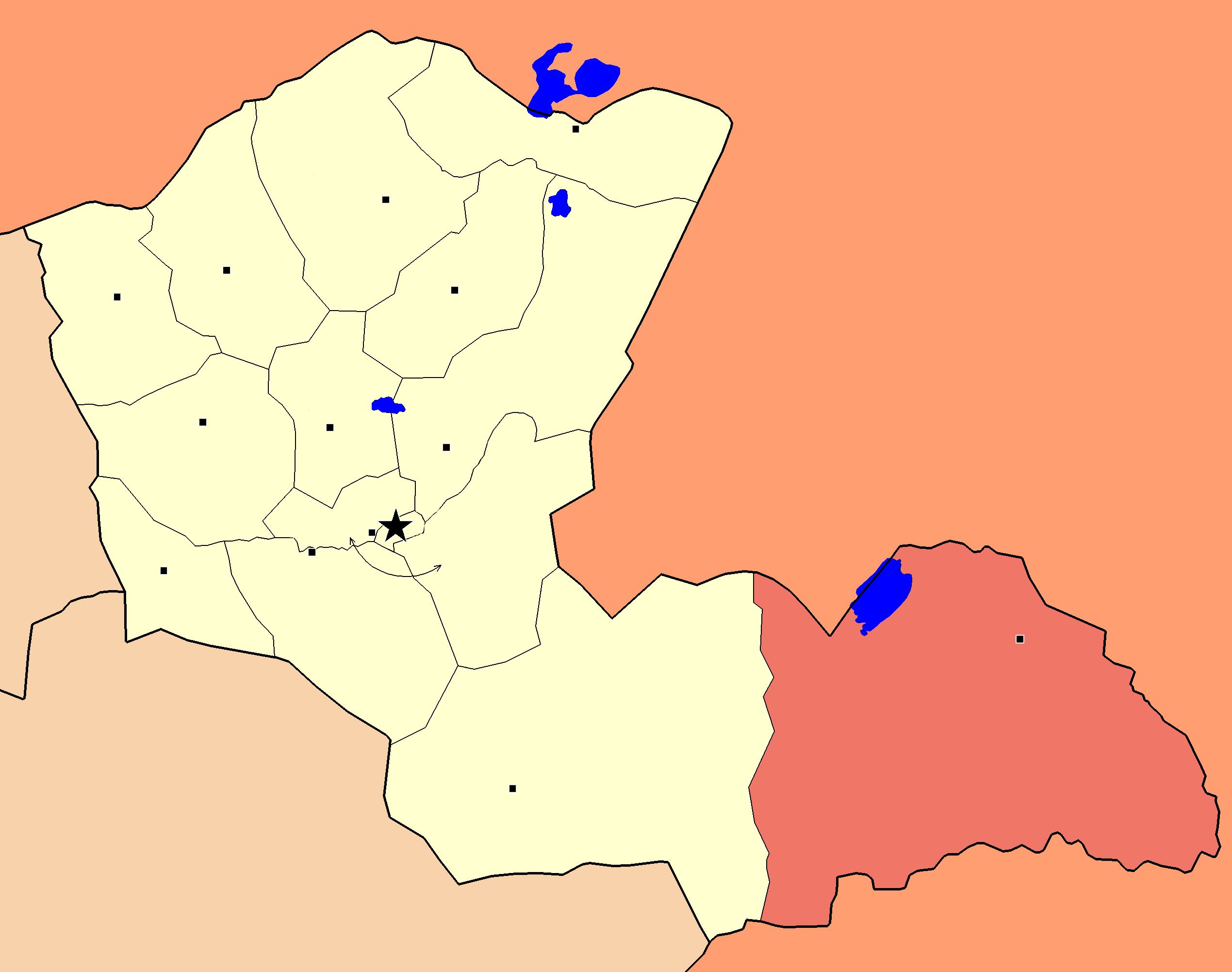
- Khalkhgol District in Dornod Province
- Coordinates: 47°37′53″N 118°37′3″E
- Country: Mongolia
- Province: Dornod Province
- Sum Center: Tsagaanbulag

Area
  - Total: 28,093 km^{2} (10,847 sq mi)

Population
  - Total: 3,203
  - Density: 0.11/km^{2} (0.28/sq mi)
- Time zone: UTC+8 (UTC + 8)
- Postal code: 21010

Khalkhgol (Mongolian: Халхгол, meaning Khalkha river) is a sum (district) of Dornod Province in eastern Mongolia. There are 3,203 people in the sum, including 1,756 in the sum center. The area of the sum is 28,093 km^{2}, with a population density of 0.11 people/km^{2}.

== History ==
In 2018, the district received an €8 million donation from Russia to redevelop the district center. In 2019, the redevelopment project was completed, which consists of the governor's office, cultural center, hospital, secondary school and its students dormitory, kindergarten and a sport hall.

== Geography ==
Khalkhgol is the largest district in Mongolia by land area. It is the easternmost district in both Dornod Province, and Mongolia as a whole.

== Geology ==
- Buir Lake

== Climate ==
Khalkhgol has a continental climate (Köppen climate classification Dwb) with warm summers and severely cold winters. Most precipitation falls in the summer as rain, with some snow in autumn and spring. Winters are quite dry, with occasional light snow.

Climate data for Khalkhgol, elevation 688 m (2,257 ft), (1991–2020 normals, extremes 1961–1990, 2002–2023)
Month	Jan	Feb	Mar	Apr	May	Jun	Jul	Aug	Sep	Oct	Nov	Dec	Year
Record high °C (°F)	−0.6 (30.9)	5.1 (41.2)	21.6 (70.9)	29.5 (85.1)	38.0 (100.4)	40.6 (105.1)	40.4 (104.7)	41.7 (107.1)	34.5 (94.1)	32.1 (89.8)	16.8 (62.2)	5.8 (42.4)	41.7 (107.1)
Mean daily maximum °C (°F)	−17.2 (1.0)	−12.1 (10.2)	−1.7 (28.9)	10.1 (50.2)	19.5 (67.1)	25.6 (78.1)	27.5 (81.5)	25.6 (78.1)	19.4 (66.9)	9.3 (48.7)	−4.1 (24.6)	−15.2 (4.6)	7.2 (45.0)
Daily mean °C (°F)	−23.5 (−10.3)	−19.3 (−2.7)	−8.7 (16.3)	3.6 (38.5)	12.2 (54.0)	18.7 (65.7)	21.2 (70.2)	19.0 (66.2)	12.0 (53.6)	2.1 (35.8)	−10.6 (12.9)	−20.8 (−5.4)	0.5 (32.9)
Mean daily minimum °C (°F)	−29.8 (−21.6)	−26.6 (−15.9)	−16.0 (3.2)	−3.5 (25.7)	4.4 (39.9)	11.3 (52.3)	15.1 (59.2)	12.8 (55.0)	4.9 (40.8)	−4.4 (24.1)	−16.5 (2.3)	−27.0 (−16.6)	−6.3 (20.7)
Record low °C (°F)	−46.7 (−52.1)	−46.0 (−50.8)	−40.5 (−40.9)	−24.1 (−11.4)	−10.3 (13.5)	−3.9 (25.0)	2.0 (35.6)	0.9 (33.6)	−11.9 (10.6)	−24.9 (−12.8)	−38.5 (−37.3)	−45.9 (−50.6)	−46.7 (−52.1)
Average precipitation mm (inches)	2.4 (0.09)	2.6 (0.10)	3.8 (0.15)	10.5 (0.41)	15.0 (0.59)	40.2 (1.58)	95.3 (3.75)	61.1 (2.41)	31.0 (1.22)	11.0 (0.43)	5.0 (0.20)	3.2 (0.13)	281.1 (11.06)
Average precipitation days (≥ 1.0 mm)	0.8	0.8	1.2	1.9	3.5	8.5	14.4	10.9	6.8	2.8	1.3	0.8	53.7
Mean monthly sunshine hours	191.5	208.8	261.7	260.4	292.2	294.4	287.1	286.4	245.7	335.0	185.1	162.7	3,011
Source 1: NOAA (precipitation and sun 1961–1990)
Source 2: Starlings Roost Weather

== Administrative divisions ==
The district is divided into three bags, which are:

- Tashgai
- Tsogtsumber
- Yalalt

== Maps ==
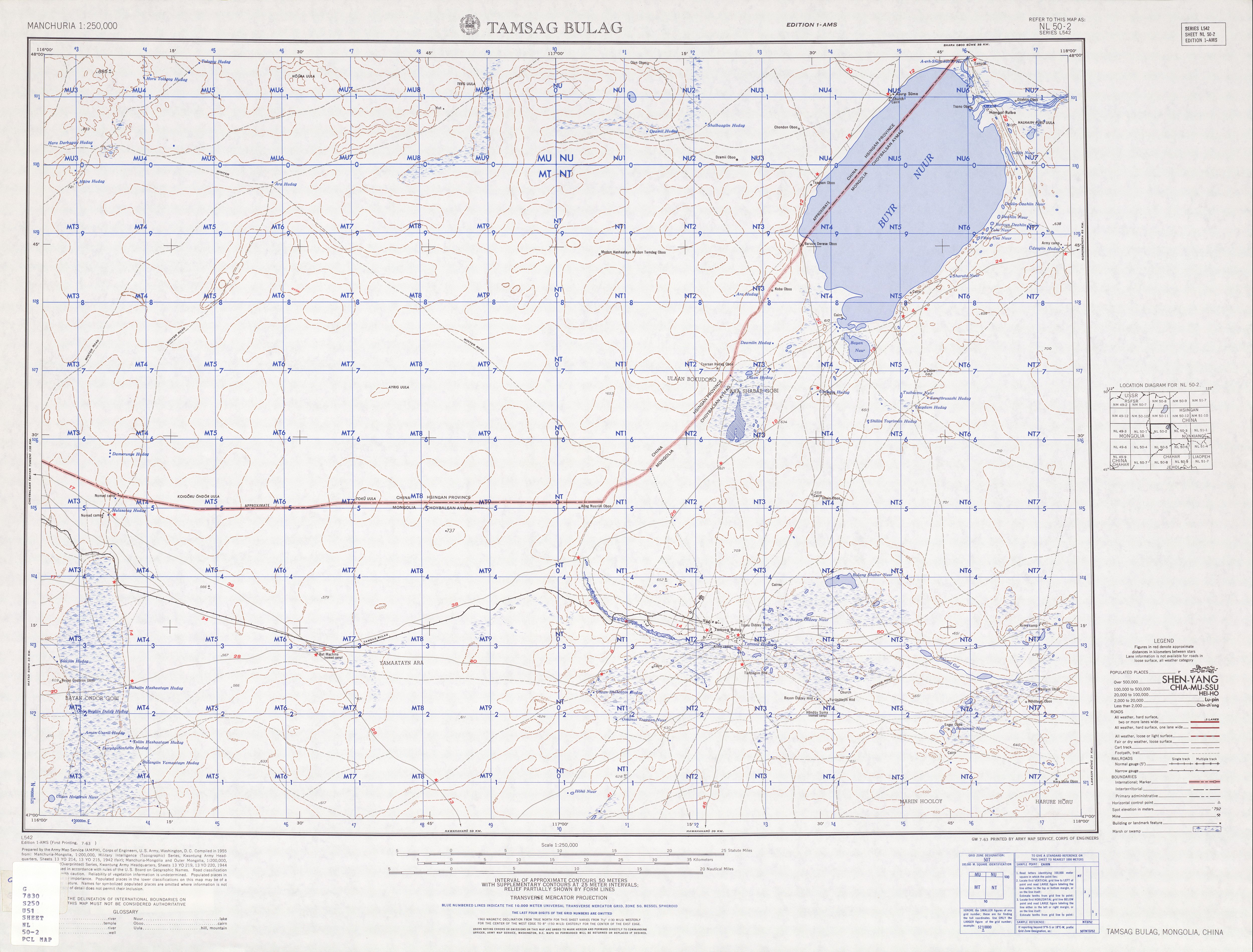
Tamsag Bulag (1955)

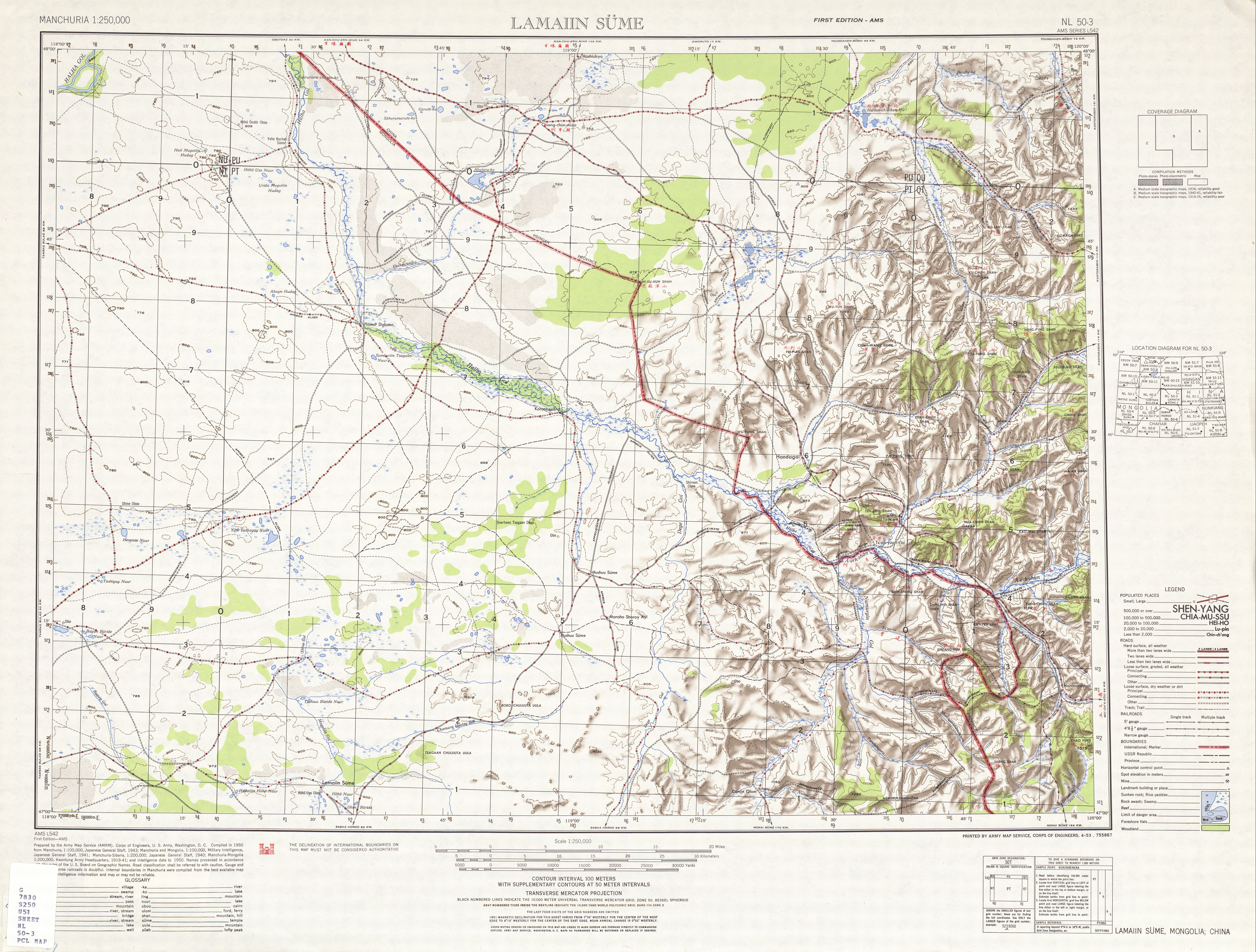
Lamaiin Süme (1955)
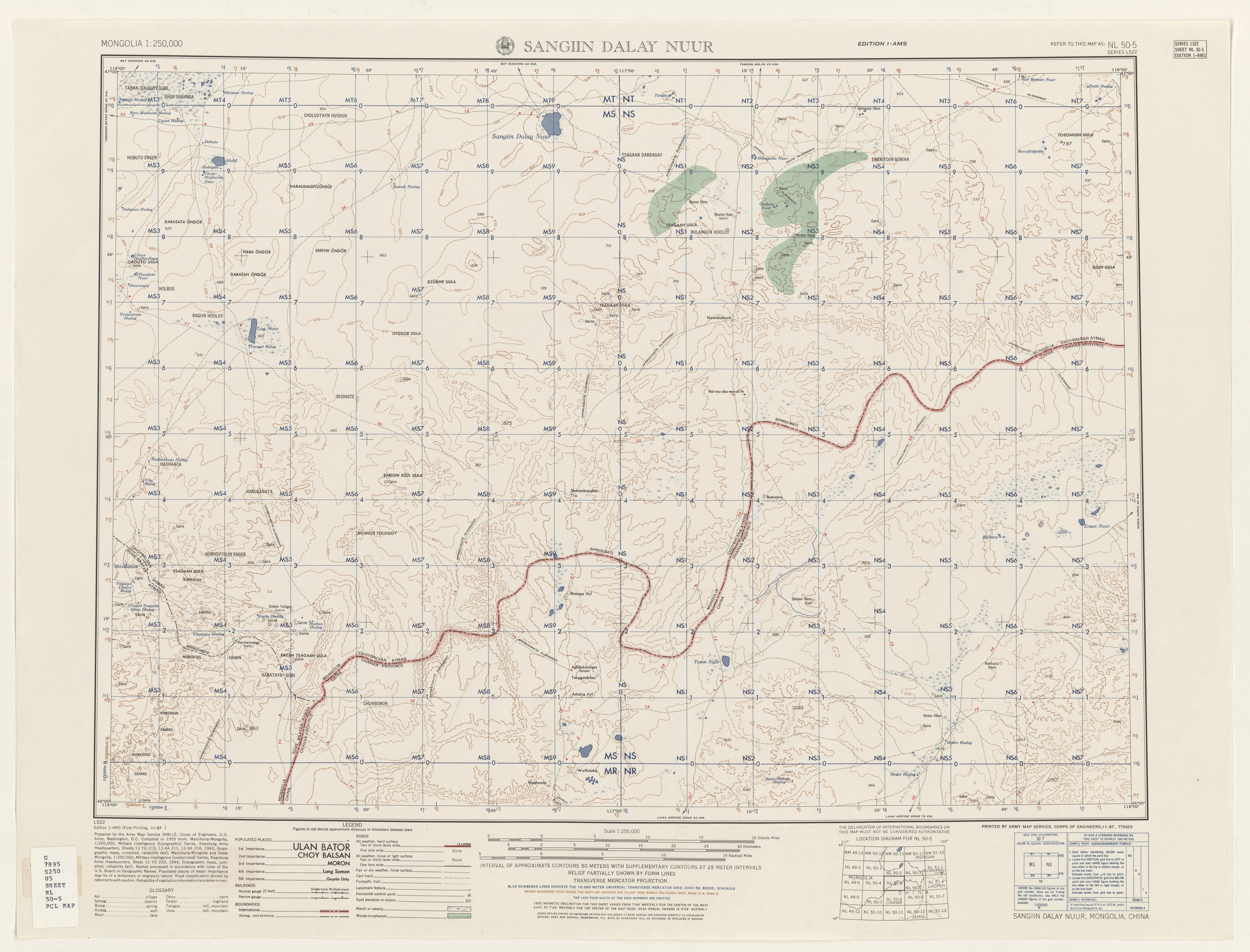
Sangiin Dalay Nurr (1955)

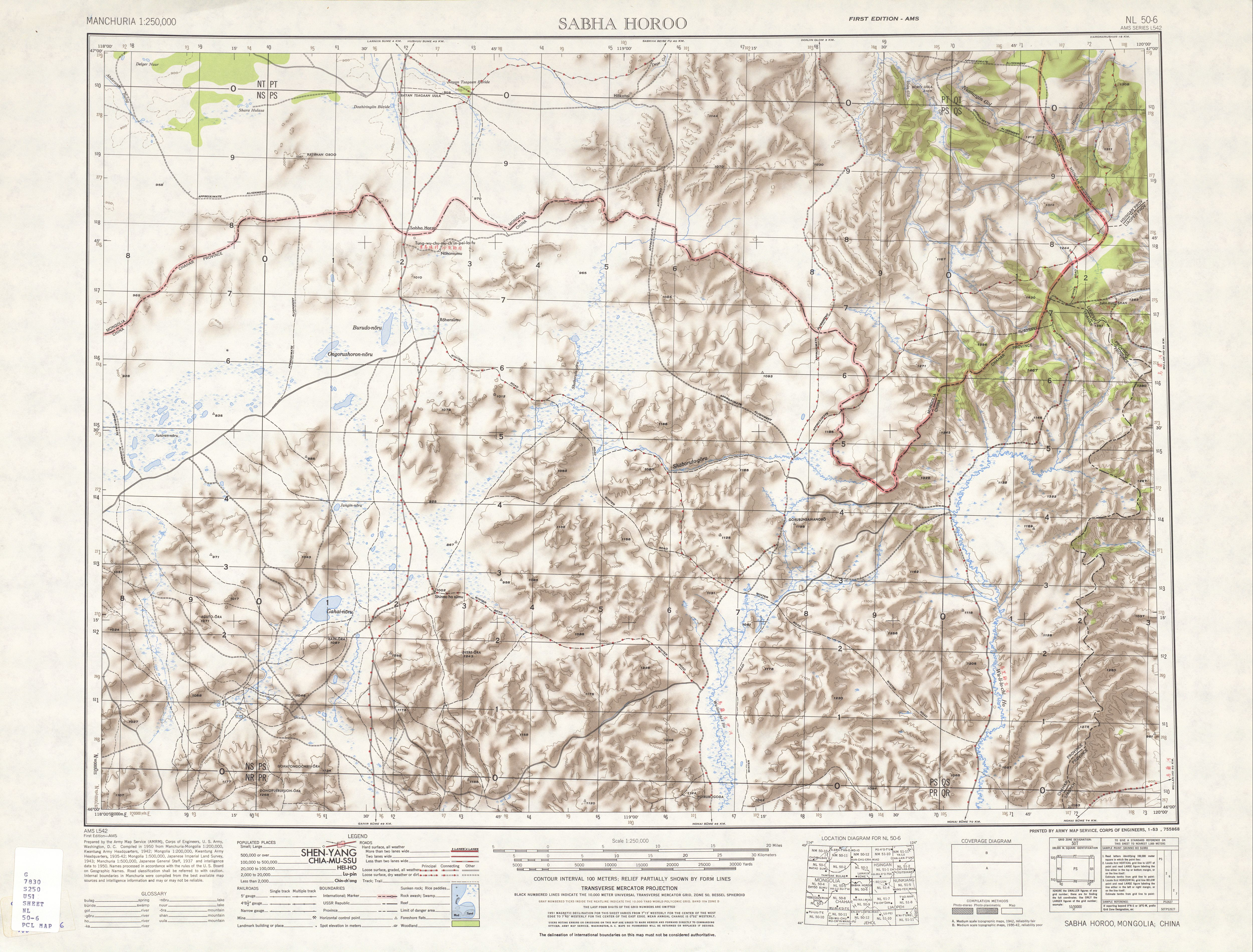
Sabha Horoo (1950)

== Tourist attractions ==
- Khalkhgol Victory Museum
