= Bayankhongor =

Provincial capital of Bayankhongor Province, Mongolia

Bayankhongor Баянхонгор ᠪᠠᠶᠠᠨᠬᠣᠩᠭᠣᠷ
- District
- Bayankhongor District

Official Cyrillic transcription(s)
  - Mongolian Cyrillic: Баянхонгор

Classical Mongolian transcription(s)
  - Mongolian script: ᠪᠠᠶᠠᠨᠬᠣᠩᠭᠣᠷ
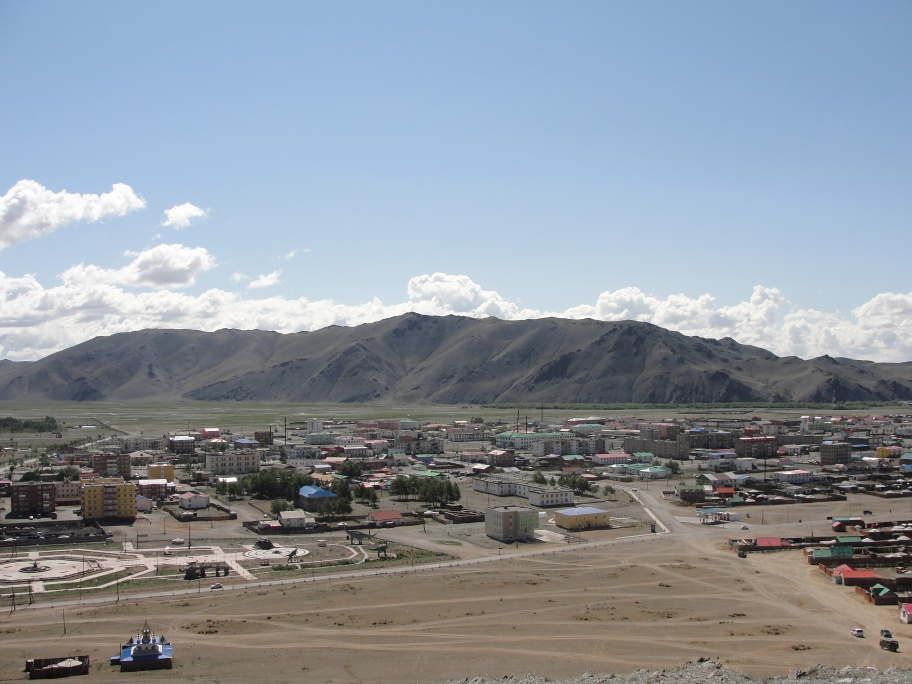

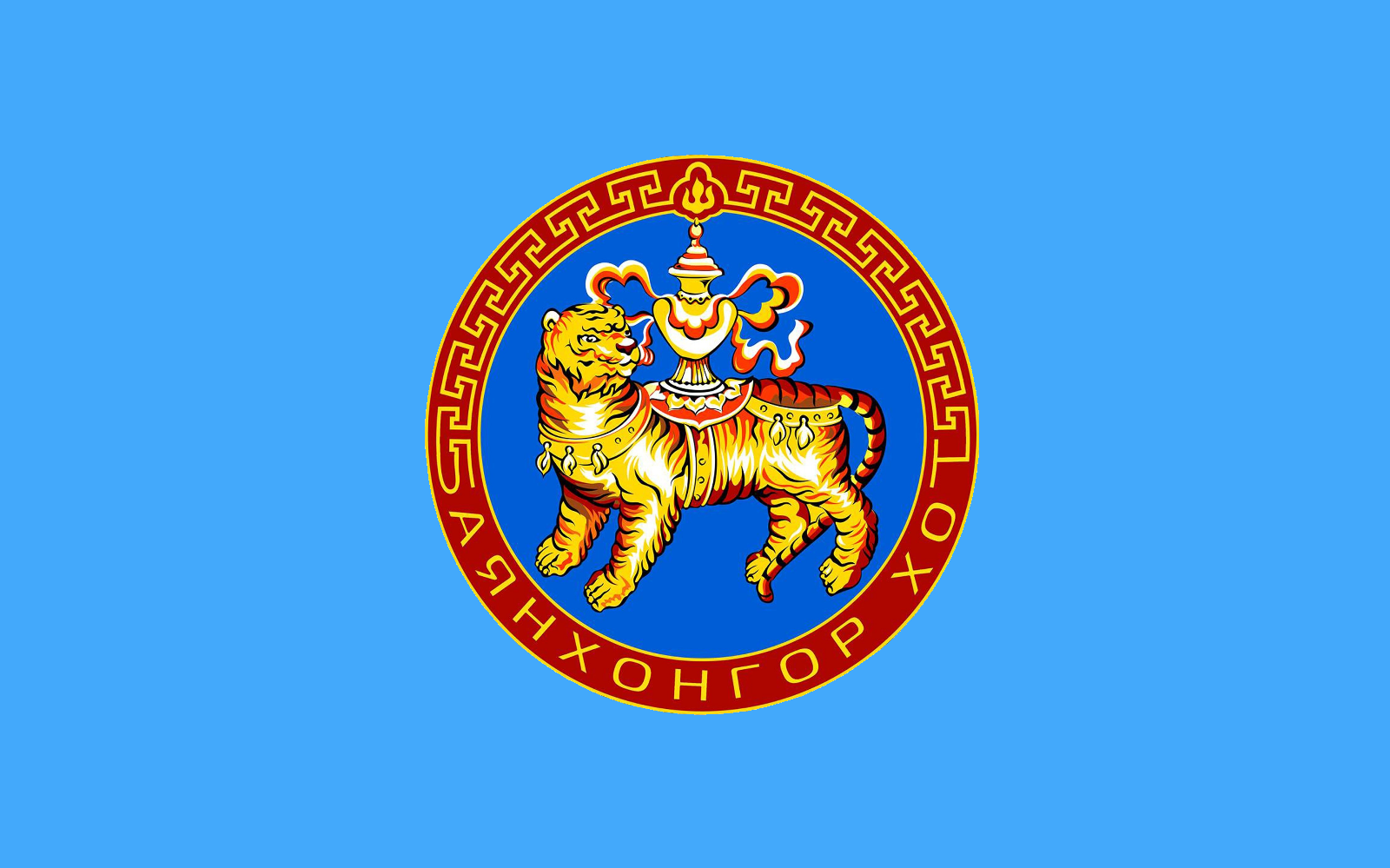
- Flag

- Location in Mongolia
- Coordinates: 46°11′30″N 100°43′04″E
- Country: Mongolia
- Province: Bayankhongor

Area
  - Total: 64.0 km^{2} (24.7 sq mi)
- Elevation: 1,874 m (6,148 ft)

Population (2026)
  - Total: 33,147
  - Density: 518/km^{2} (1,340/sq mi)
- Time zone: UTC+8
- Area code: +976 (0)144
- Climate: BSk
- License plate: БХ_ (_ variable)

Bayankhongor (Mongolian: Баянхонгор, lit. 'rich soft, or rich sweetheart') is the capital of the Bayankhongor Province (aimag) in Mongolia with the administration of the Bayankhongor Sum (district) also located at the same place. The city is at an elevation of 1859 m above sea level, and has a population of 33,147 (2026). Approximately one-third of the aimag's population lives in the city.

== History ==
The original founding of Bayankhongor city coincided with the creation of Bayankhongor Province in 1941 by Resolution No. 115 of the Speakers of the Assembly of Mongolia, Bayankhongor Province, and the Legislative Council of the Mongolian People's Republic. However, in the early years of the city it became apparent that the settlement was not suitable for large-scale human habitation that would befit a provincial capital. This is due to the fact that the land around the city was covered in permafrost. Therefore, the original site of the city was abandoned in 1961 in favour of its current-day location. The 900 families comprising more than 3,500 people were relocated. Since then, the population of Bayankhongor city has increased substantially to comprise more than 33,000 people. More than 38% of the population of Bayankhor Province lives in the capital.

== Geography ==
Bayankhongor is located on the western bank of the Tuin river (ᠲᠦᠢ ᠶᠢᠨ ᠭᠣᠤᠯ). In recent years mining in the region and climate change have had a negative impact on the river's water levels, threatening the city's access to freshwater. The city is connected to the rest of the country by road in the forms of the A0303 and A0302. It experiences a cold semi-arid climate (Köppen: BSk) with long, dry, very cold winters and short, warm summers.

Climate data for Bayankhongor, elevation 1,858 m (6,096 ft), (1991–2020 normals, extremes 1963–present)
Month	Jan	Feb	Mar	Apr	May	Jun	Jul	Aug	Sep	Oct	Nov	Dec	Year
Record high °C (°F)	4.3 (39.7)	9.1 (48.4)	22.9 (73.2)	27.3 (81.1)	30.5 (86.9)	33.0 (91.4)	34.7 (94.5)	34.0 (93.2)	29.0 (84.2)	20.3 (68.5)	13.7 (56.7)	7.0 (44.6)	34.7 (94.5)
Mean daily maximum °C (°F)	−11.1 (12.0)	−6.4 (20.5)	1.3 (34.3)	10.6 (51.1)	17.3 (63.1)	22.9 (73.2)	24.7 (76.5)	23.0 (73.4)	16.8 (62.2)	7.9 (46.2)	−2.0 (28.4)	−9.3 (15.3)	8.0 (46.3)
Daily mean °C (°F)	−18.2 (−0.8)	−14.3 (6.3)	−6.2 (20.8)	3.4 (38.1)	10.1 (50.2)	16.0 (60.8)	18.2 (64.8)	16.2 (61.2)	9.6 (49.3)	0.8 (33.4)	−9.0 (15.8)	−15.9 (3.4)	0.9 (33.6)
Mean daily minimum °C (°F)	−23.3 (−9.9)	−20.2 (−4.4)	−12.6 (9.3)	−3.5 (25.7)	2.9 (37.2)	9.3 (48.7)	12.3 (54.1)	10.1 (50.2)	3.3 (37.9)	−5.2 (22.6)	−14.3 (6.3)	−20.7 (−5.3)	−5.2 (22.7)
Record low °C (°F)	−36.8 (−34.2)	−35.9 (−32.6)	−31.5 (−24.7)	−23.3 (−9.9)	−12.8 (9.0)	−1.2 (29.8)	1.1 (34.0)	−1.1 (30.0)	−9.6 (14.7)	−25.5 (−13.9)	−34.5 (−30.1)	−39.9 (−39.8)	−39.9 (−39.8)
Average precipitation mm (inches)	2 (0.1)	3 (0.1)	5 (0.2)	8 (0.3)	16 (0.6)	33 (1.3)	55 (2.2)	45 (1.8)	17 (0.7)	6 (0.2)	3 (0.1)	3 (0.1)	196 (7.7)
Average precipitation days (≥ 1.0 mm)	1.4	1.9	1.6	2.0	3.0	5.2	8.5	6.1	2.9	2.0	1.9	1.6	38.0
Average relative humidity (%)	62.6	57.6	49.5	41.8	40.7	47.1	53.4	52.6	48.5	50.6	56.2	60.8	51.8
Mean monthly sunshine hours	260.5	223.7	271.5	275.1	320.1	309.6	308.8	293.2	280.8	261.7	220.6	205.4	3,231
Mean daily sunshine hours	8.4	7.9	8.8	9.2	10.3	10.3	10.0	9.5	9.4	8.4	7.4	6.6	8.9
Source 1: Pogoda.ru.net
Source 2: NOAA (sun 1962-1990), Deutscher Wetterdienst (daily sun 1962-1990)

== Administrative divisions ==
The district is divided into ten bags, which are:

- Duursakh
- Erdenemandal
- Gegeen shavi
- Nomgon
- Rashaant
- Shargaljuut*
- Tsagaanchuluut
- Tsakhir
- Ugalz
- Yesunbulag

^{*} Shargaljuut is an urban-type settlement under Bayankhongor sum jurisdiction, but located 54 km NE from Bayankhongor city.

== Tourist attractions ==
- Museum of Bayankhongor Province
- Counter-Strike 2 Professional E-Sports Team Bayankhongor

== Transportation ==
The Bayankhongor Airport (BVN/ZMBH) has two runways, one of them paved.
