= Göktürk Museum =

Museum in Khashaat, Arkhangai, Mongolia

- Хөшөө Цайдам Музей
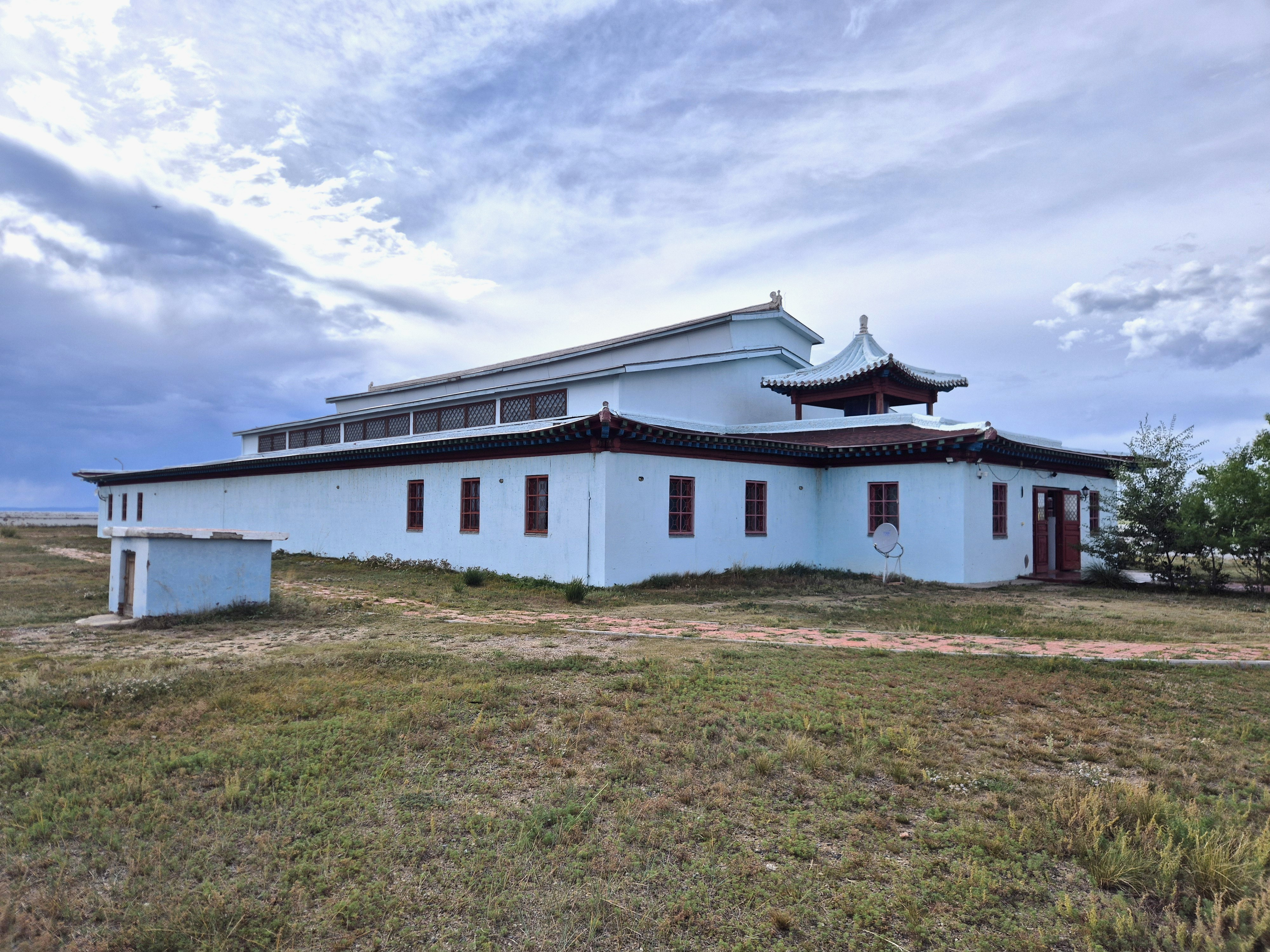
- Established: 2008
- Location: Khashaat, Arkhangai, Mongolia
- Coordinates: 47°33′38.1″N 102°50′28.4″E
- Type: museum

The Göktürk Museum or Khoshoo Tsaidam Museum (Хөшөө Цайдам Музей) is a museum in Khashaat, Arkhangai Province, Mongolia.

== History ==
The museum site is the original location of the Göktürk monuments. The museum was constructed with the help of Turkish Cooperation and Coordination Agency. It was established in 2008.

The Bilge Qaghan and Kul Tigin monuments were found in the Orkhon Valley Cultural Landscape UNESCO world heritage site 47 km to the northwest of here. For better preservation of the monuments, they were brought to the museum, and copies of them were erected on the places where they were originally found.

== See also ==
- List of museums in Mongolia
