= Khalkhgol Victory Museum =

Museum in Khalkhgol, Dornod, Mongolia

Khalkhgol Victory Museum Халхголын Ялалтын Музей
- Established: 18 August 1984; 42 years ago
- Location: Khalkhgol, Dornod, Mongolia
- Coordinates: 47.6334°N 118.6154°E
- Type: War museum

The Khalkhgol Victory Museum (Mongolian: Халхголын Ялалтын Музей) is a military and history museum located in Khalkhgol, Dornod Province, Mongolia.

== History ==
The Political Bureau of the Central Committee of the Mongolian People's Party issued a resolution for the establishment of a museum in 1982. The intention for creating this museum was to make it easier for the public to access the heritage and history of the Mongolian People's Republic. The building was designed by the architect G.Tserendorj The construction of the museum was completed in 1984, in order to commemorate the battle of Khalkgol. In 2019, renovation work began in different parts of the museum.

== Collections ==
The museum stores photographs, historical artifacts and flags of the Mongolian People's Republic. The museum contains more than 1000 exhibits, including weapons and equipment used by Mongolian and Soviet soldiers, also includes certain military uniforms as well as ammunition. The museum contains documents and photographs on the relations between the Mongolian People's Republic and the Soviet Union. The museum also contains exhibits on the Mongolian independence process. The museum has a cafeteria, a meeting room and an audiovisual room.

== See also ==
- List of museums in Mongolia
