= Arvaikheer =

Provincial capital of Övörkhangai Province, Mongolia

Arvaikheer District Арвайхээр сум Arwaiheer sum ᠠᠷᠪᠠᠶᠢᠬᠡᠭᠡᠷᠰᠤᠮᠤ
- District

Official Cyrillic transcription(s)
  - Mongolian Cyrillic: Арвайхээр сум

Classical Mongolian transcription(s)
  - Mongolian script: ᠠᠷᠪᠠᠶᠢᠬᠡᠭᠡᠷᠰᠤᠮᠤ
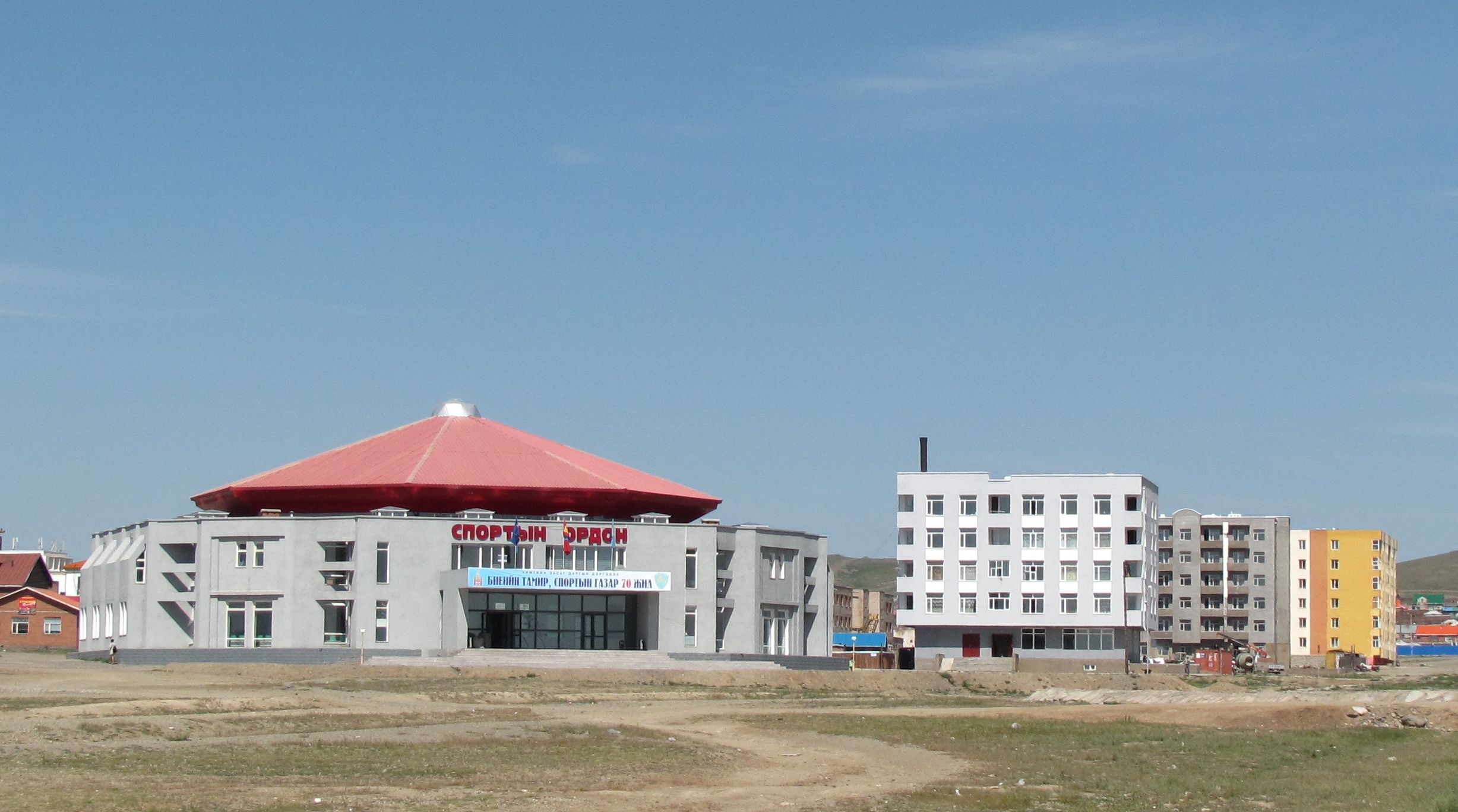
- Sports' Palace

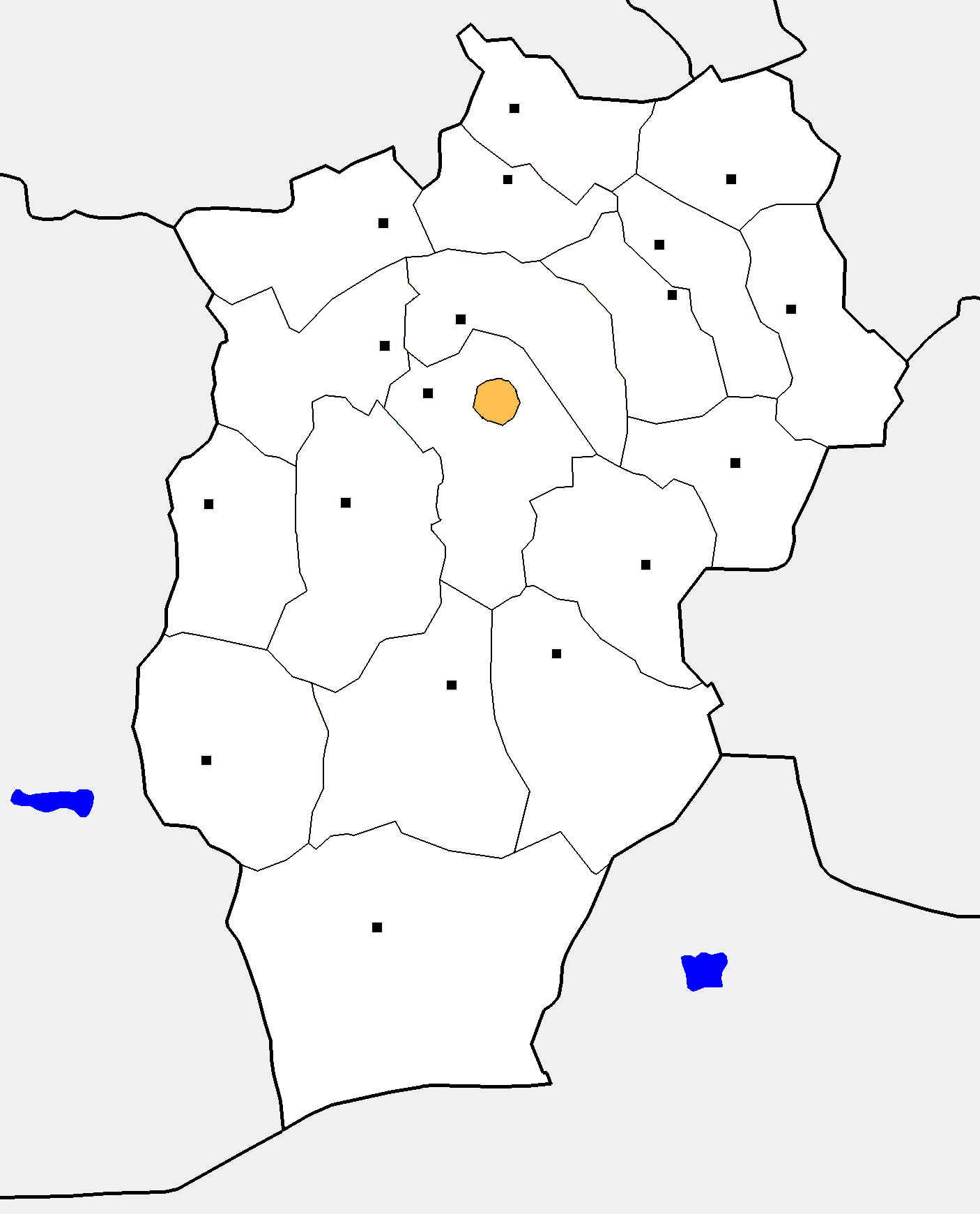
- Arvaikheer City in Övörkhangai Province

- Location within Mongolia
- Coordinates: 46°15′58″N 102°46′40″E
- Country: Mongolia
- Province: Övörkhangai Province

Area
  - Total: 173 km^{2} (67 sq mi)
- Elevation: 1,817 m (5,961 ft)

Population (2017)
  - Total: 29,420
  - Density: 170/km^{2} (440/sq mi)
- Time zone: UTC+8 (UTC + 8)
- Area code: +976 (0) 132
- Vehicle registration: ӨВ_
- Climate: BSk

Arvaikheer, also spelt Arwaiheer (Mongolian: Арвайхээр, [arw̜æˑˈçeːr]; "Barley Steppe") is the capital of Övörkhangai Aimag (province) and one of the most central points of Mongolia.

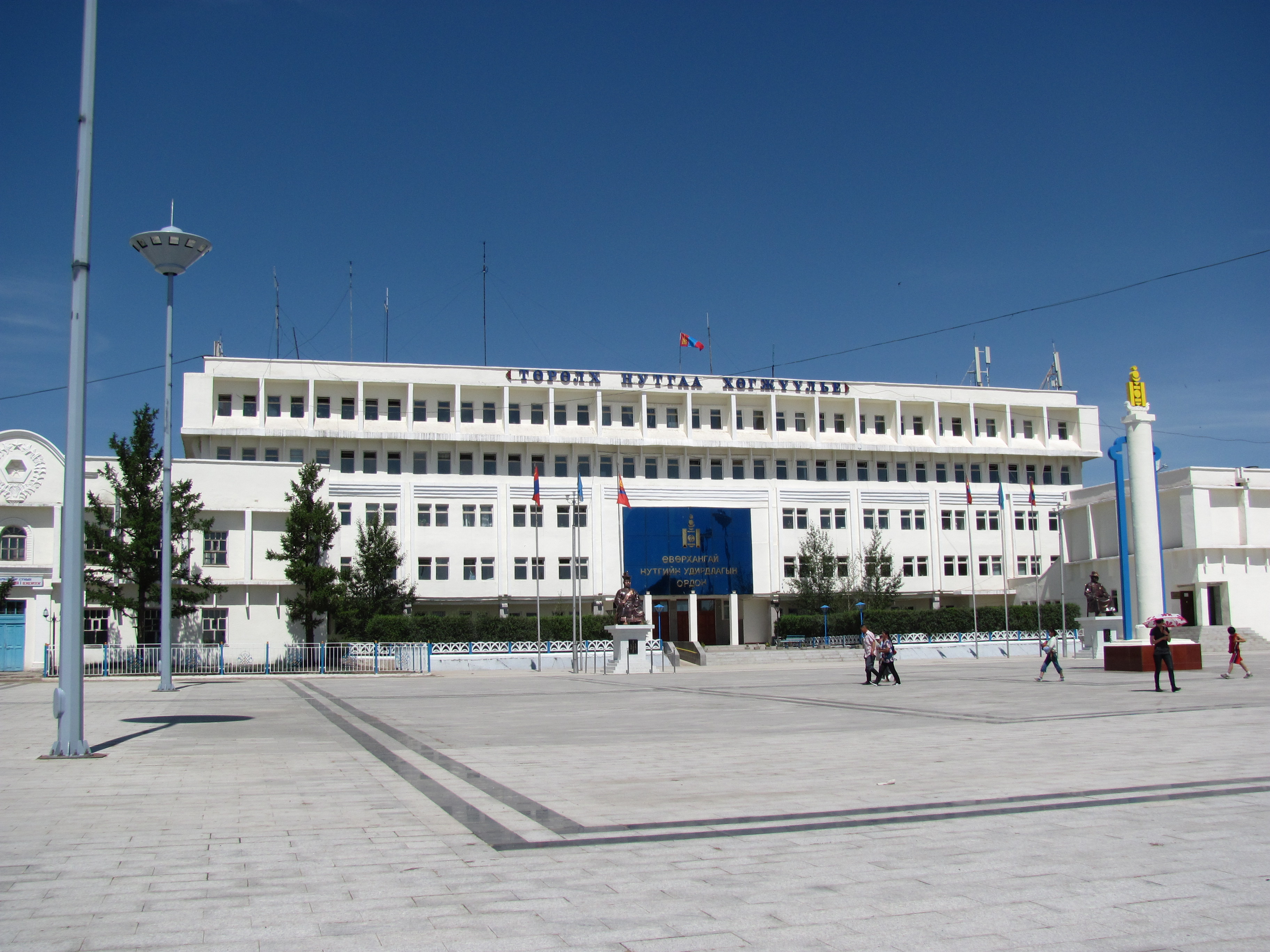
Administration building

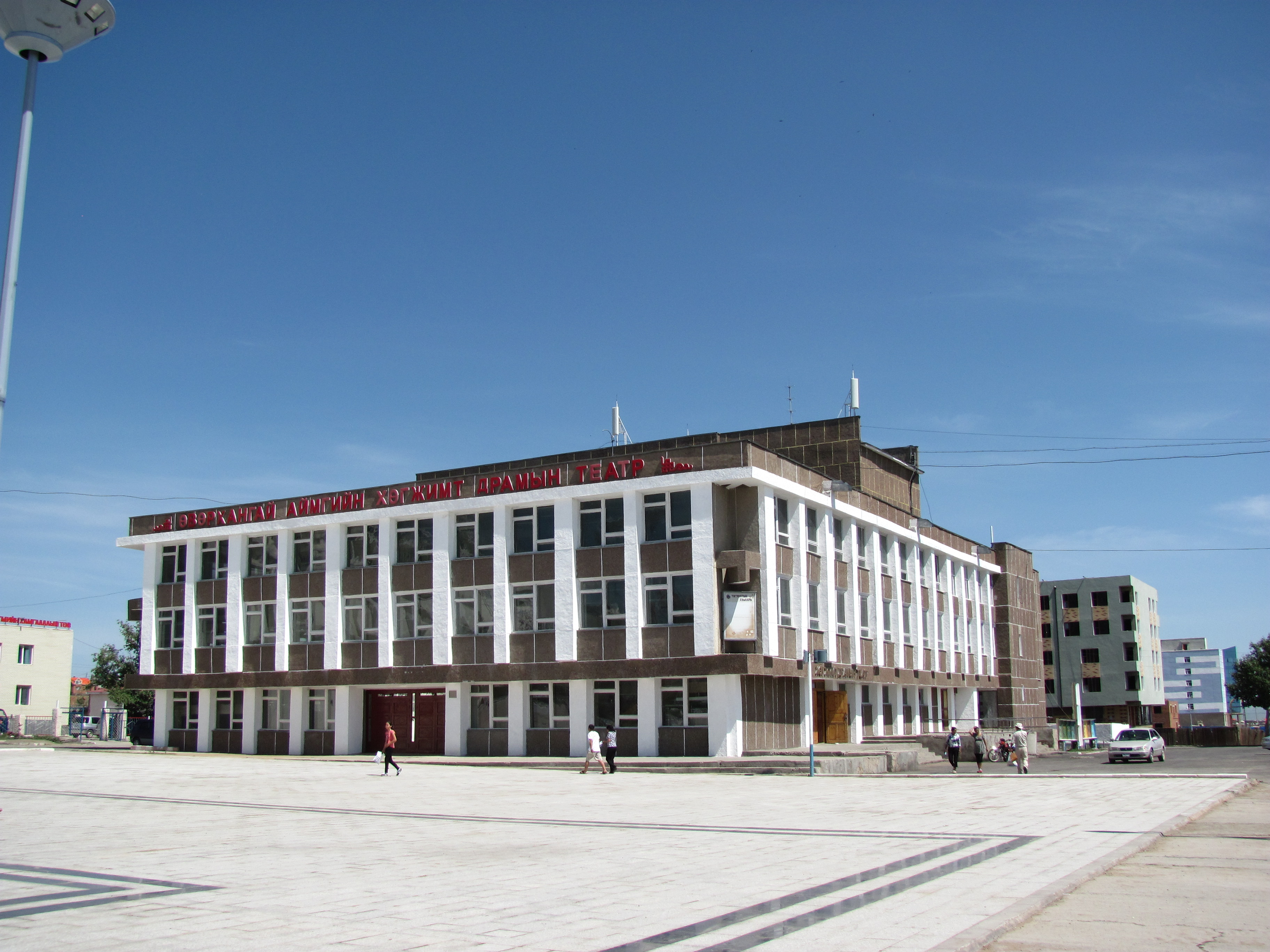
Theatre

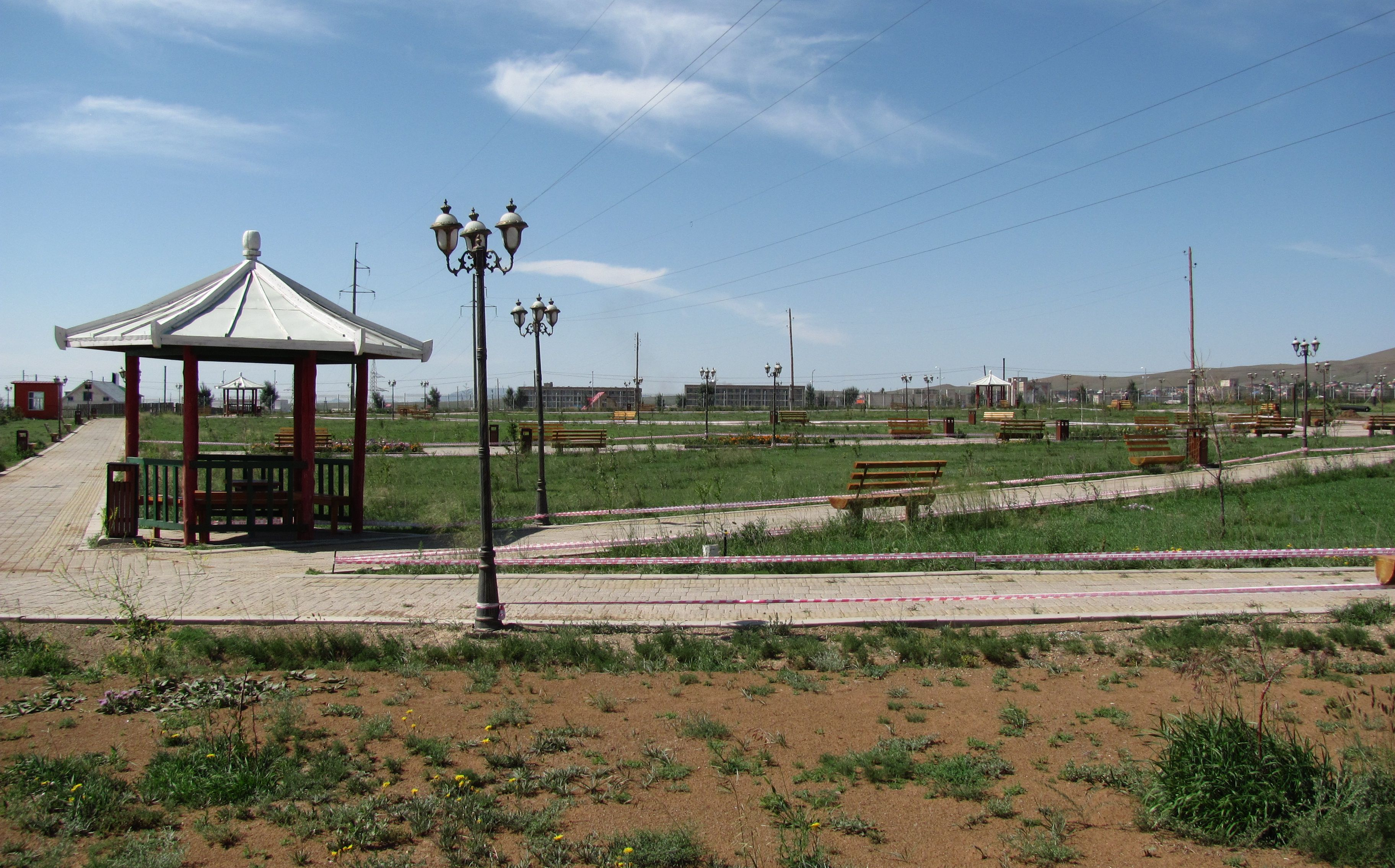
New park

It is a centre for traditional crafts, goat herding and equestrian sports, and hosts a large regional horse festival every year. Arvaikheer has a population of 19,058 (2000 census), 23,298 (2004 est.), 24,954 (2006 est.), 25,622 (2008 est.). Arvaikheer is by far the largest town in the aimag.

== Climate ==
Arvaikheer has a cold semi-arid climate (Köppen climate classification BSk) with mild summers and relatively mild winters by Mongolian standards. The 30 degrees Celsius difference between average January and average July temperature makes it the mildest place in Mongolia, along with Tsetserleg in Arkhangai Province. It is located in a microclimate in the center of Mongolia which sees less harsh winters than the rest of the country. Its 1,813 metres (5,948 ft) elevation at the foot of the eastern hills of the Khangai Mountains augments its mildness by keeping it distant from cold-air pools in low basins. Most precipitation falls in the summer as rain, with some snow in March, April and October. Winters are very dry.

Climate data for Arvaikheer, elevation 1,813 m (5,948 ft), (1991–2020, extremes 1940–present)
Month	Jan	Feb	Mar	Apr	May	Jun	Jul	Aug	Sep	Oct	Nov	Dec	Year
Record high °C (°F)	7.4 (45.3)	12.2 (54.0)	23.8 (74.8)	28.2 (82.8)	31.5 (88.7)	34.0 (93.2)	35.5 (95.9)	32.4 (90.3)	28.1 (82.6)	22.4 (72.3)	15.9 (60.6)	8.8 (47.8)	35.5 (95.9)
Mean daily maximum °C (°F)	−8.8 (16.2)	−5.2 (22.6)	1.8 (35.2)	10.2 (50.4)	16.6 (61.9)	21.7 (71.1)	23.5 (74.3)	21.9 (71.4)	16.6 (61.9)	8.4 (47.1)	−0.7 (30.7)	−7.0 (19.4)	8.2 (46.9)
Daily mean °C (°F)	−14.4 (6.1)	−11.3 (11.7)	−4.7 (23.5)	3.5 (38.3)	10.0 (50.0)	15.3 (59.5)	17.5 (63.5)	15.7 (60.3)	10.2 (50.4)	2.3 (36.1)	−6.5 (20.3)	−12.4 (9.7)	2.1 (35.8)
Mean daily minimum °C (°F)	−18.9 (−2.0)	−16.4 (2.5)	−10.3 (13.5)	−2.4 (27.7)	4.0 (39.2)	9.6 (49.3)	12.5 (54.5)	10.5 (50.9)	4.5 (40.1)	−3.0 (26.6)	−11.4 (11.5)	−16.9 (1.6)	−3.2 (26.3)
Record low °C (°F)	−33.9 (−29.0)	−33.9 (−29.0)	−27.4 (−17.3)	−26.1 (−15.0)	−13.9 (7.0)	−3.9 (25.0)	1.3 (34.3)	−0.1 (31.8)	−10.1 (13.8)	−21.1 (−6.0)	−32.8 (−27.0)	−30.6 (−23.1)	−33.9 (−29.0)
Average precipitation mm (inches)	1 (0.0)	1 (0.0)	2 (0.1)	5 (0.2)	15 (0.6)	36 (1.4)	81 (3.2)	58 (2.3)	16 (0.6)	4 (0.2)	2 (0.1)	1 (0.0)	222 (8.7)
Average precipitation days (≥ 1.0 mm)	1.3	1.3	1.6	2.1	3.0	6.7	10.5	8.3	3.3	1.9	1.7	1.0	42.8
Average relative humidity (%)	57.8	54.3	48.5	43.7	43.4	50.8	59.2	59.1	50.4	48.5	53.8	57.0	52.2
Percentage possible sunshine	59	58	47	40	41	47	58	58	50	44	50	56	51
Source 1: Pogoda.ru.net
Source 2: NOAA, Deutscher Wetterdienst (percent sun 1940-1958)

== Administrative divisions ==
The district is divided into 13 bags, which are:

- Arvaikheer
- Burkhi
- Delgerekh
- Delgerekhiin Denj
- Emt
- Khuis Tolgoi
- Noyon
- Ongi
- Rashaant
- Sogoot
- Ulziit
- Yagaantolgoi
- Zulegt

== Transportation ==
The Arvaykheer Airport has one unpaved runway and is served by regular flights to Ulaanbaatar and Altai. Arvaikheer is linked to Ulaanbaatar by a paved road and can be reached by public buses from the capital.

== Sights and infrastructure ==
Until 1990, Arvaikheer was the headquarters of a large division of the Soviet Army which had a profound influence on daily life in the town. After the fall of Soviet Communism, however, many public buildings were renovated or rebuilt, such as the Sports' Palace in the eastern part of the town. A large park was laid out opposite.

Located about one mile from the central square is Gandan Muntsaglan Khiid, a monastery that was destroyed in 1937 during the purges under Khorloogiin Choibalsan and later reopened in 1991. As of 2008, it housed approximately 60 monks.

Arvaikheer is home to the Museum of Övörkhangai Province, which exhibits fossils and artifacts from the nearby site of Karakorum. Another museum is dedicated to the artist Zanabazar.

Arvaikheer has a large hospital, a kindergarten and various schools and colleges.
