= List of museums in Mongolia =

This is a list of museums in Mongolia.

== Arkhangai ==
- Göktürk Museum
- Museum of Arkhangai Province

== Bayan-Ölgii ==
- Museum of Bayan-Ölgii Province

== Bayankhongor ==
- Museum of Bayankhongor Province

== Darkhan-Uul ==
- Museum of Darkhan-Uul Province
- Museum of Sharyngol

== Dornod ==
- Khalkhgol Victory Museum
- Museum of Dornod Province

== Dornogovi ==
- Danzanravjaa Museum
- Sainshand Natural History Museum

== Khovd ==
- Museum of Khovd Province

== Khentii ==
- Setsenkhaan Palace and Khentii Province museum

== Ömnögovi ==
- Gobi Museum of Nature and History

== Orkhon ==
- Museum of Orkhon Province

== Övörkhangai ==
- Kharakhorum Museum
- Museum of Övörkhangai Province

== Selenge ==
- Museum of Selenge Province

== Sükhbaatar ==
- General Museum of Sükhbaatar Province

== Töv ==
- Museum of Töv Province

== Ulaanbaatar ==
- Chinggis Khaan National Museum
- Choijin Lama Temple Museum
- Hunting and Game Museum
- International Intellectual Museum
- Marshall Zhukov House Museum
- Mongol Costumes Museum
- Museum of Traditional Medicine
- Mongolian Military Museum
- Mongolia Museum of Art
- Mongolian Natural History Museum
- Mongolian Railway History Museum
- Mongolian Theatre Museum
- National Art Gallery of Mongolia
- National Museum of Mongolia
- Green Palace
- The Fine Arts Zanabazar Museum
- Museum of Japanese POW
- Ulaanbaatar City Museum

== Uvs ==
- Museum of Uvs Province

== Former museums ==
- Central Museum of Dinosaurs of Mongolia
- Memorial Museum of Victims of Political Repression

== See also ==
- List of museums
- Tourism in Mongolia
- Culture of Mongolia
