= Shargaljuut Hot Spring =

Hot spring in Shargaljuut, Erdenetsogt, Bayankhongor, Mongolia

- Шаргалжуутын рашаан
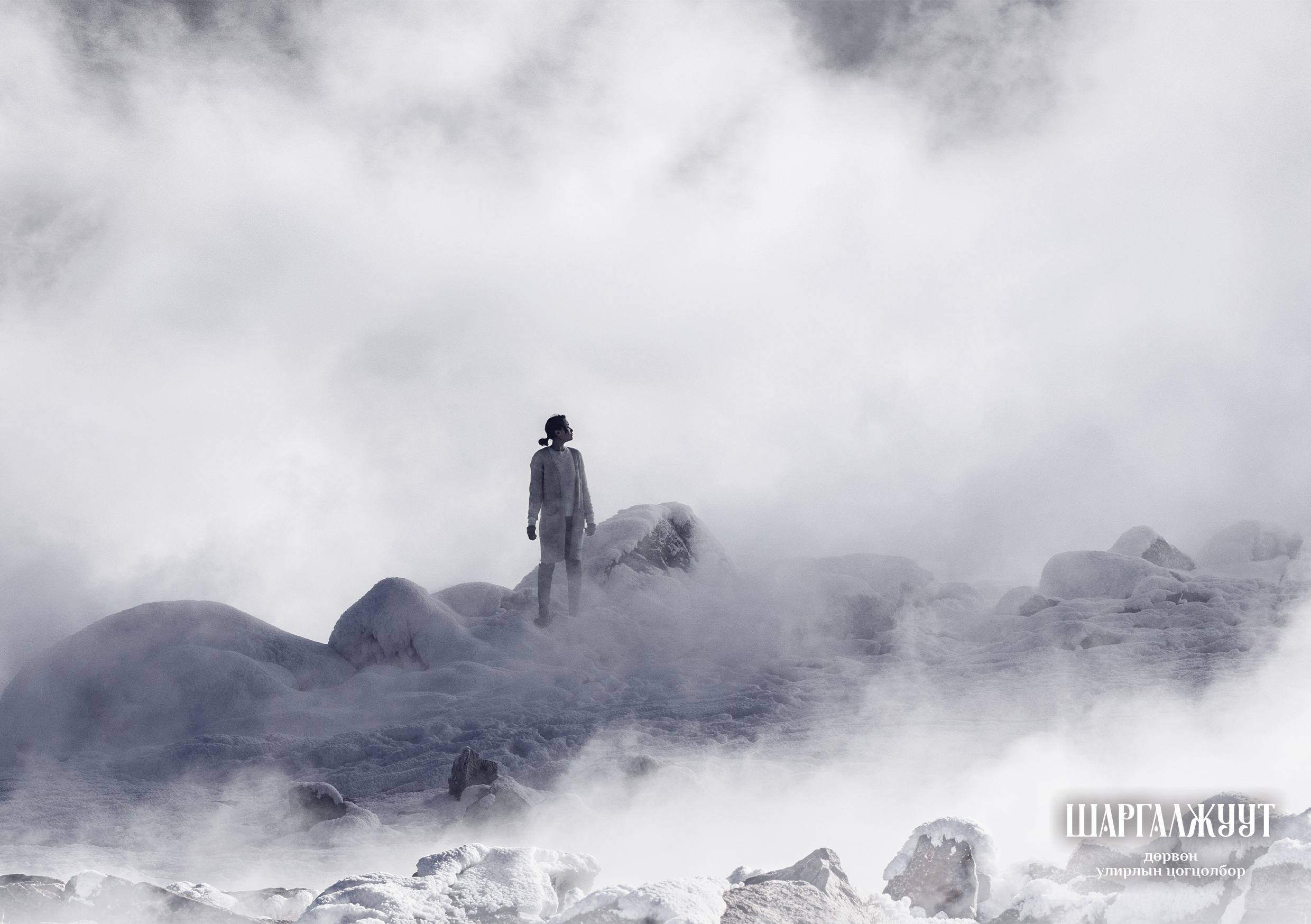
- Interactive map of Shargaljuut Hot Spring
- Location: Shargaljuut, Erdenetsogt, Bayankhongor, Mongolia
- Coordinates: 46°19′56.5″N 101°13′38.8″E
- Elevation: 1,500 m (4,900 ft)
- Type: hot spring
- Temperature: 60 °C (140 °F)

The Shargaljuut Hot Spring (Mongolian: Шаргалжуутын рашаан) is a hot spring in Shargaljuut, Erdenetsogt, Bayankhongor Province, Mongolia.

== History ==
The hot spring was developed into a sanatorium in 1962.

== Geology ==
The hot spring is located at an elevation of 1,500 meters above sea level. The area consists of more than 100 hot springs. The temperature of the spring goes up to 60 °C. There are multiple springs varying from 20°C to 95°C, which are used by tourists from other parts of Mongolia, particularly Ulaanbaatar.

== See also ==
- Geology of Mongolia
