= Museum of Bayankhongor Province =

Museum in Bayankhongor City, Bayankhongor Province, Mongolia

- Баянхонгор Aймгийн Mузей
- Established: 1980
- Location: Bayankhongor City, Bayankhongor Province, Mongolia
- Coordinates: 46°11′45.0″N 100°43′25.1″E
- Type: museum

The Museum of Bayankhongor Province (Mongolian: Баянхонгор Aймгийн Mузей) is a museum in Bayankhongor City, Bayankhongor Province, Mongolia.

== History ==
The museum was established in 1980.

== Architecture ==
The museum is divided into two main sections, which are the History and Ethnographic Museum and the Natural History Museum.

== See also ==
- List of museums in Mongolia
