= Museum of Övörkhangai Province =

Museum in Arvaikheer, Övörkhangai, Mongolia

- Өвөрхангай Aймгийн Mузей
- Established: 1951
- Location: Arvaikheer, Övörkhangai, Mongolia
- Coordinates: 46°15′49.6″N 102°46′46.2″E
- Type: museum

The Museum of Övörkhangai Province (Mongolian: Өвөрхангай Aймгийн Mузей) is a museum in Arvaikheer, Övörkhangai Province, Mongolia.

== History ==
The museum was originally established in 1951. In 1966, it was upgraded into a local history museum. In 1995, the museum also act as a cultural center for promoting the local culture. In 2014, the museum building underwent renovation.

== See also ==
- List of museums in Mongolia
