= Museum of Töv Province =

Museum in Zuunmod, Töv, Mongolia

- Төв Aймгийн Mузей
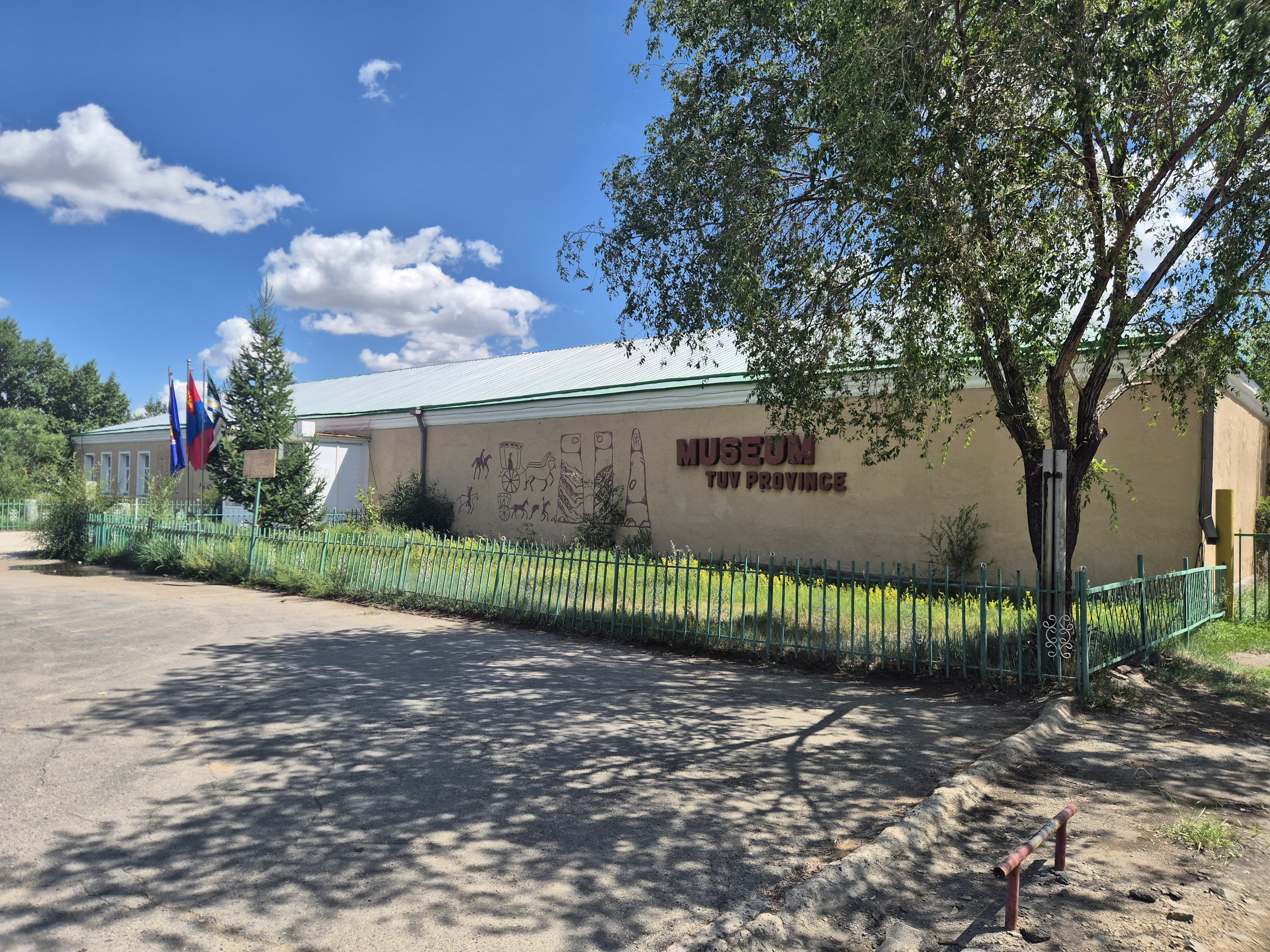
- Established: 1951 (main building); 1972 (Manjusri Monastery branch); 1993 (ethnography branch)
- Location: Zuunmod, Töv, Mongolia
- Coordinates: 47°42′22.1″N 106°57′00.6″E
- Type: museum

The Museum of Töv Province (Mongolian: Төв Aймгийн Mузей) is a museum in Zuunmod, Töv Province, Mongolia.

== History ==
The museum was originally established in 1951. In 1966, the museum was renamed Local Study Museum. In 1972, the museum opened a small branch at the nearby Manjusri Monastery. In 1991, the museum was renamed as Museum of Töv Province. In 1993, another mall branch was established focusing on ethnography.

== Architecture ==
At the front of the museum building stands a tortoise statue. The museum has a total exhibition floor area of 500 m^{2}. The museum is divided into two main section and four exhibition halls. The two main sections are the nature section and historical section. The four exhibition halls are geography, game, history and contemporary history halls.

== Exhibitions ==
The main museum has an exhibition of local history and animals. It also has some photo exhibitions. The ethnography branch of the museum houses around 500 exhibits, such as local traditional clothes, utensils, tools, religious items, toys etc.

== See also ==
- List of museums in Mongolia
