= Mongolian Military Museum =

Museum in Bayanzürkh, Ulaanbaatar, Mongolia

- Mongolian: Монгол Цэргийн Музей
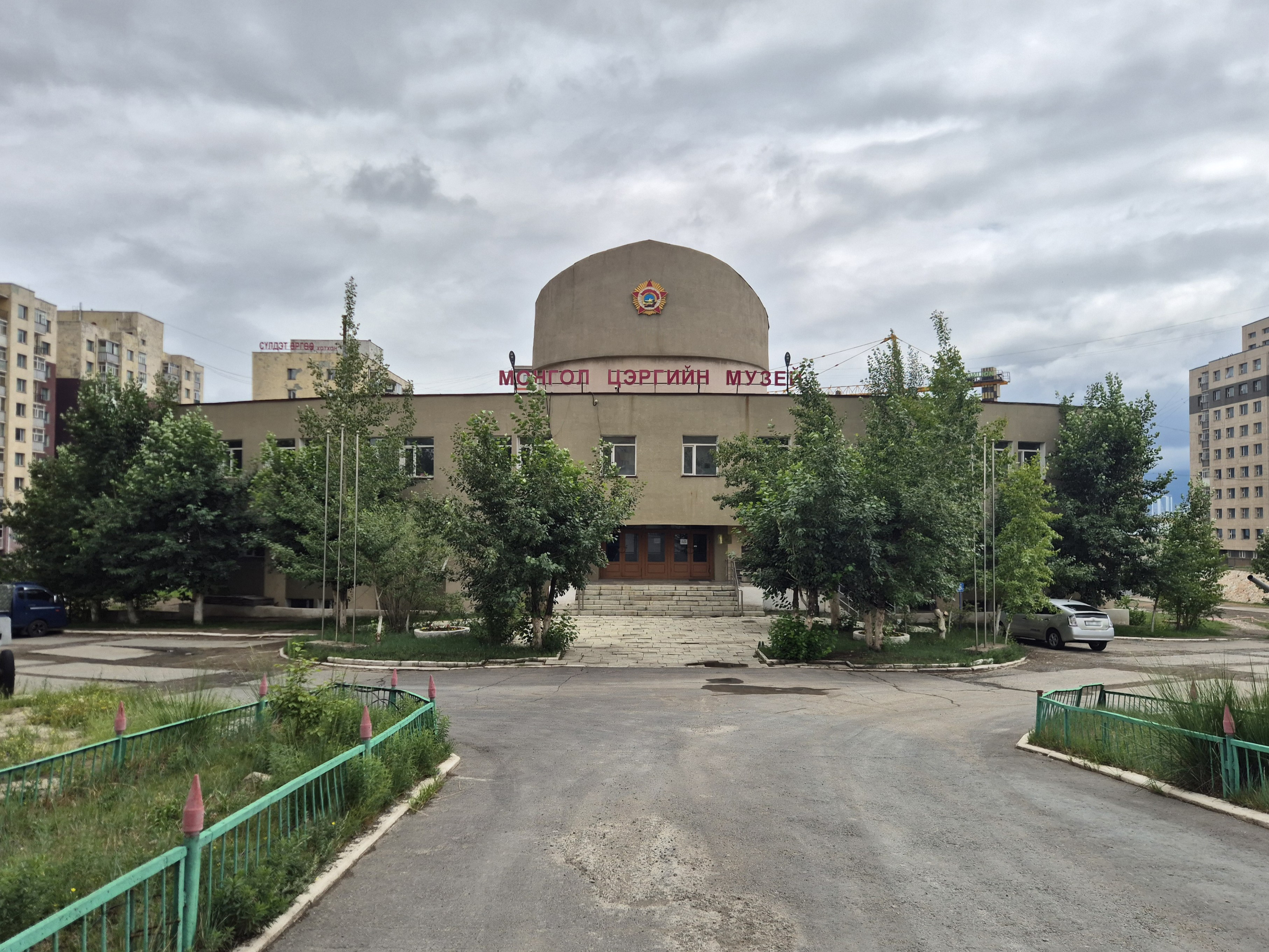
- Established: 21 January 1966
- Location: Bayanzürkh, Ulaanbaatar, Mongolia
- Coordinates: 47.9226°N 106.9533°E
- Type: Museum of military history
- Collection size: 8,000
- Founder: Government of Mongolia

The Mongolian Military Museum (Mongolian: Монгол Цэргийн Музей), also known as the Museum of the Mongolian Armed Forces, is a military museum located in Bayanzürkh District, Ulaanbaatar, Mongolia. It explains Mongolian military history dating back to the Mongol Empire. It is currently located across from an army barracks. The museum is part of the Ministry of Defense.

== History ==
The concept of an all-Mongolian museum of military history was initially proposed by Minister of Military Affairs Marshal Gelegdorjiin Demid (1932-1937), but the museum was not established until years later. On 21 January 1966, The Mongolian People's Revolutionary Party's Central Committee held a meeting to establish The Mongolian Army Museum. The relevant document on its establishment (decree No.2) is itself situated in the modern museum. After over 20 years of research, the museum's groundbreaking ceremony took place on 24 October 1987 in the presence of General Secretary Jambyn Batmönkh, Defence Minister Jamsrangijn Jondon and other party officials. The museum building held its opening ceremony on 15 March 1996 after which it received its first visitors.

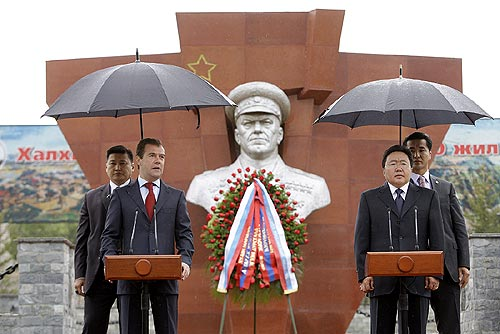
Russian president Dmitry Medvedev and Mongolian president Tsakhiagiin Elbegdorj standing in front of a statue of Zhukov at his house-museum during a ceremony commemorating the 70th anniversary of Khalkhin Gol.

Marshal of the Soviet Union Georgy Zhukov's summer home in Mongolia during the Battles of Khalkhin Gol was a historical building in the capital and independent of the Ministry of Defense prior to 1990 when it was transferred to the Mongolian Military Museum that year.

== Exhibits ==
The museum currently contains 8,000 historical Mongolian army-related possessions. Two halls contain more than 3,000 exhibits specifically related to the structure of the armed forces and interventions made by Mongolia military personnel, including a display from the Mongolian Expeditionary Task Force in Operation Enduring Freedom, its display featuring rocket shrapnel that landed on a Mongolian compound at Al Diwaniyah. The museum also has two rare Russian Mosin–Nagant bolt-action, internal magazine–fed, military sniper rifles in its inventory. Throughout the exhibition halls, military artifacts spanning hundreds of years are displayed, from weapons and military tactics of the Mongol Empire to the Soviet-style uniforms of the Mongolian People's Army.

== See also ==
- Zaisan Memorial
- Sükhbaatar's Mausoleum
- List of museums in Mongolia
- National Museum of Mongolia
