= Erdenetsogt =

District in Bayankhongor Province, Mongolia

Coordinates: 46°25′10″N 100°49′18″E

Erdenetsogt District (Soum) Эрдэнэцогт сум ᠡᠷᠳᠡᠨᠢᠴᠣᠭᠲᠤᠰᠤᠮᠤ
- District
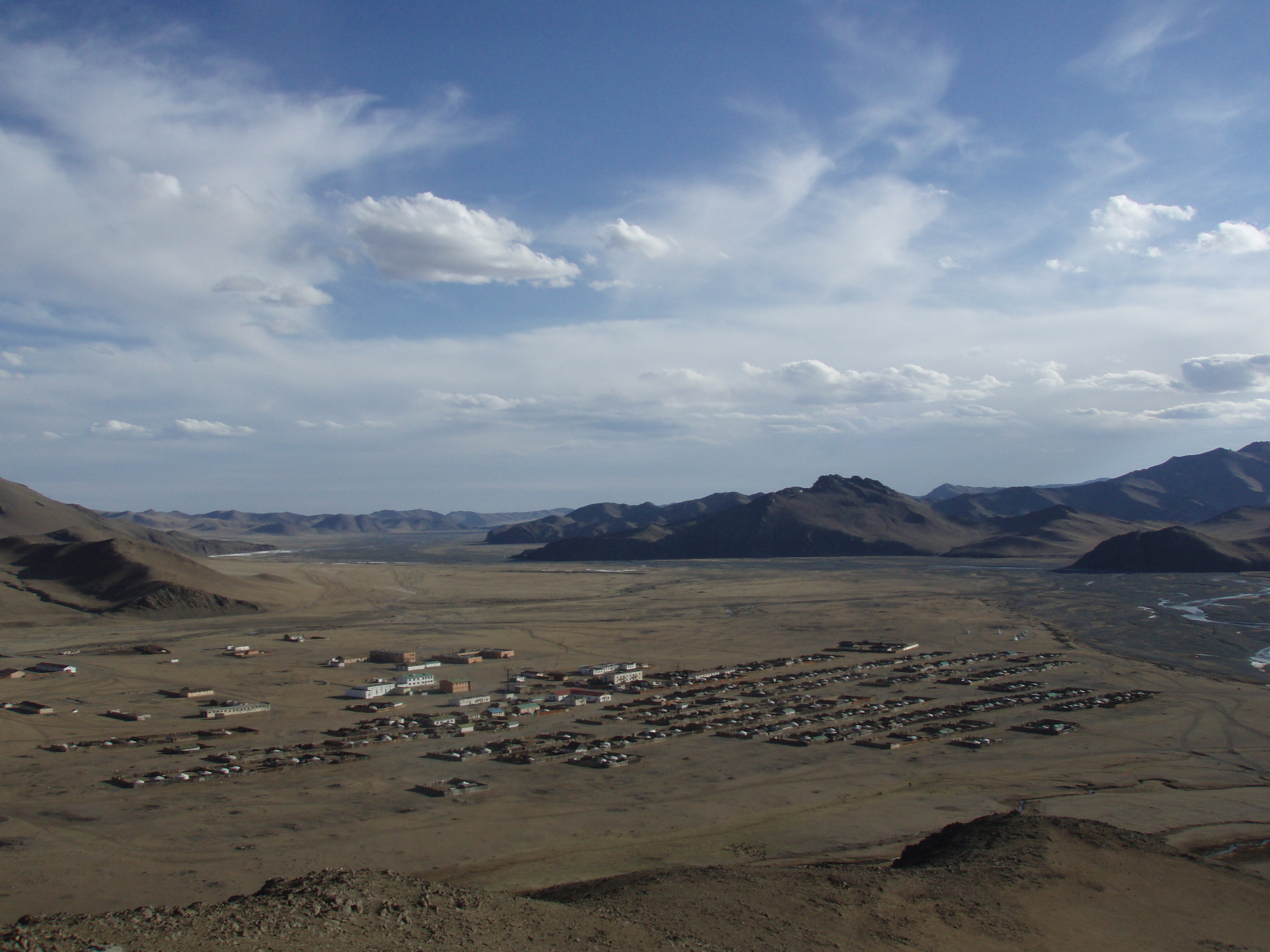

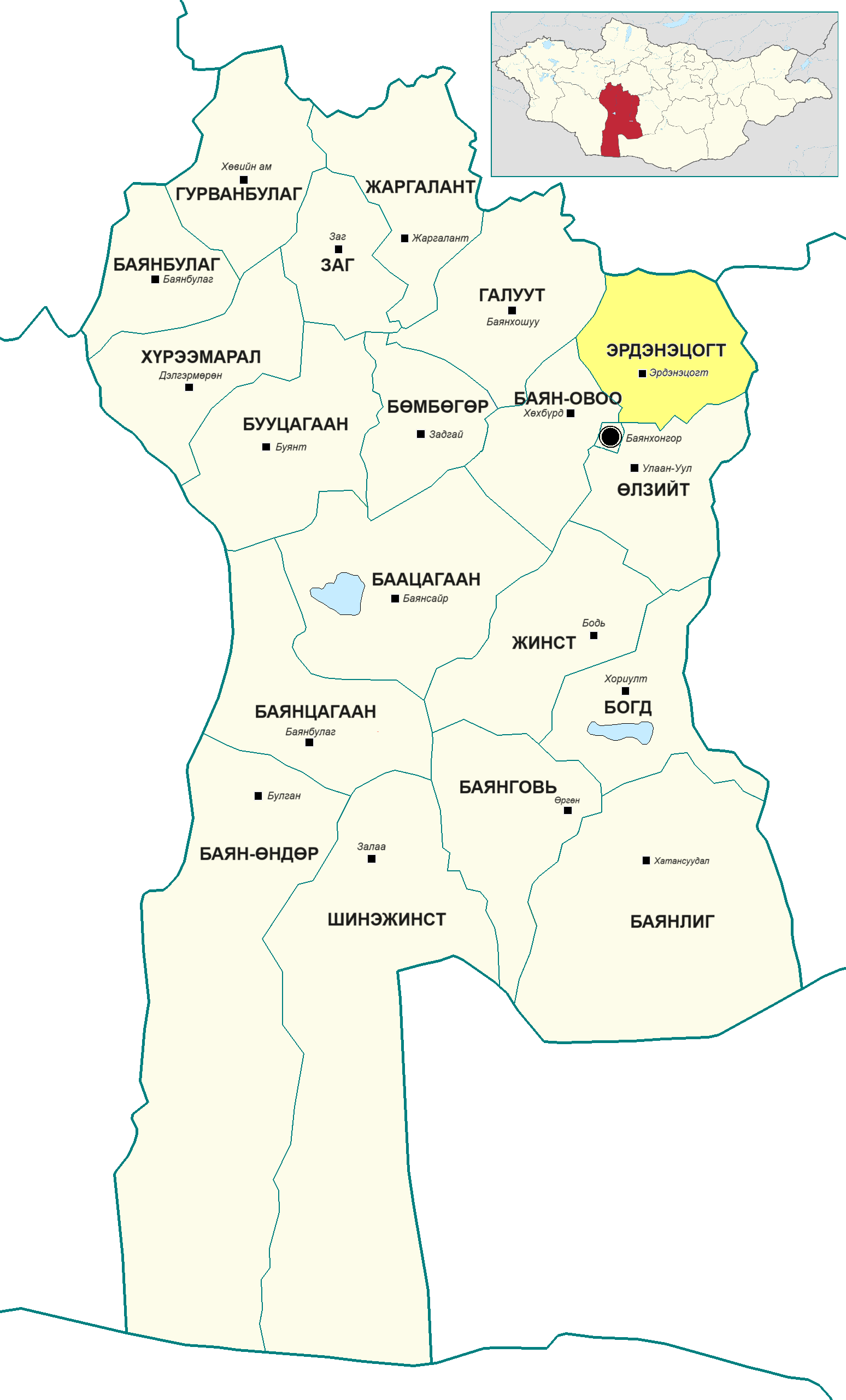
- Erdenetsogt District in Bayankhongor Province
- Country: Mongolia
- Province: Bayankhongor Province

Area
  - Total: 4,100 km^{2} (1,600 sq mi)
- Time zone: UTC+8 (UTC + 8)

Erdenetsogt (Mongolian: Эрдэнэцогт, Jewel tsogt) is a sum (district) of Bayankhongor Province in southern Mongolia. In 2006, its population was 4,235.

== Administrative divisions ==
The district is divided into six bags, which are:

- Erkhet Khairkhan
- Janjin
- Senjit
- Tsagaan Denj
- Uvgunjargalant
- Yamaat

== Tourist attractions ==
- Shargaljuut Hot Spring
