= List of airports by ICAO code: Z =

List of airports by ICAO code: A - B - C - D - EB-EG - EH-EY - FA-FM - FN-FZ - G - H - ~~I~~ - J - KA-KH - KI-KP - KR-KZ - LA-LJ - LK-LZ - M - N - O - P - Q - R - SA-SC - SD-SH - SI - SJ - SK-SM - SN-SP - SQ - SS-SU - SV-SY - T - U - V - W - ~~X~~ - YA-YG - YH-YQ - YR-YZ - Z

The prefix Z is used for the People's Republic of China with three exceptions:

- ZK is used for North Korea
- ZM is used for Mongolia
- ZZZZ is a special code which is used when no ICAO code exists for the airport. It is often used by helicopters not operating at an aerodrome.

== Z (except ZK, ZM and ZZZZ) - Mainland China ==
Also see airport category and list.

=== ZB - Northern China (Beijing, Tianjin, Inner Mongolia, Shanxi, Hebei) ===
ICAO	IATA	Airport name	Community	Coordinates
ZBAA	PEK	Beijing Capital International Airport	Beijing	40°04′21″N 116°35′51″E
ZBAD	PKX	Beijing Daxing International Airport	Beijing	39°30′33″N 116°24′38″E
ZBAL	AXF	Alxa Left Banner Bayanhot Airport	Alxa Left Banner, Inner Mongolia	38°44′54″N 105°35′19″E
ZBAR	RHT	Alxa Right Banner Badanjilin Airport	Alxa Right Banner, Inner Mongolia	39°13′30″N 101°32′46″E
ZBBB		Beijing Xijiao Airport	Beijing	39°57′40″N 116°15′23″E
ZBCD	CDE	Chengde Puning Airport	Chengde, Hebei	41°07′21″N 118°04′26″E
ZBCF	CIF	Chifeng Yulong Airport	Chifeng, Inner Mongolia	42°09′17″N 118°50′05″E
ZBCZ	CIH	Changzhi Wangcun Airport	Changzhi, Shanxi	36°14′51″N 113°07′34″E
ZBDH	BPE	Qinhuangdao Beidaihe Airport	Qinhuangdao, Hebei	39°39′59″N 119°03′32″E
ZBDS	DSN	Ordos Ejin Horo International Airport	Ordos (Dongsheng), Inner Mongolia	39°29′38″N 109°51′44″E
ZBDT	DAT	Datong Yungang International Airport	Datong, Shanxi	40°03′37″N 113°28′55″E
ZBEN	EJN	Ejin Banner Taolai Airport	Ejin Banner, Inner Mongolia	42°00′56″N 101°00′02″E
ZBER	ERL	Erenhot Saiwusu International Airport	Erenhot, Inner Mongolia	43°25′36″N 112°05′54″E
ZBES	YIE	Arxan Yiershi Airport	Arxan, Inner Mongolia	47°18′38″N 119°54′43″E
ZBHD	HDG	Handan Airport	Handan, Hebei	36°31′26″N 114°25′48″E
ZBHH	HET	Hohhot Baita International Airport	Hohhot, Inner Mongolia	40°51′05″N 111°49′27″E
ZBHZ	HUO	Holingol Huolinhe Airport	Holingol, Inner Mongolia	45°29′14″N 119°24′26″E
ZBLA	HLD	Hulunbuir Hailar Airport	Hailar, Inner Mongolia	49°12′18″N 119°49′30″E
ZBLC	LCT	Luancheng Shijiazhuang Airport	Shijiazhuang, Hebei	37°54′46″N 114°35′29″E
ZBLF	LFQ	Linfen Qiaoli Airport	Linfen, Shanxi	36°07′54″N 111°39′29″E
ZBLL	LLV	Lüliang Airport	Lüliang, Shanxi	37°41′00″N 111°08′34″E
ZBMZ	NZH	Manzhouli Xijiao Airport	Manzhouli, Inner Mongolia	49°34′00″N 117°19′48″E
ZBNY	NAY	Beijing Nanyuan Airport	Beijing	39°47′03″N 116°23′39″E
ZBOW	BAV	Baotou Erliban Airport	Baotou, Inner Mongolia	40°33′35″N 109°59′48″E
ZBSG	SZH	Shuozhou Zirun Airport	Shuozhou, Shanxi	39°16′23″N 112°41′28″E
ZBSH		Qinhuangdao Shanhaiguan Airport	Qinhuangdao, Hebei	39°58′05″N 119°43′52″E
ZBSJ	SJW	Shijiazhuang Zhengding International Airport	Shijiazhuang, Hebei	38°16′51″N 114°41′48″E
ZBSN	TVS	Tangshan Sannühe Airport	Tangshan, Hebei	39°43′31″N 117°59′36″E
ZBTJ	TSN	Tianjin Binhai International Airport	Tianjin	39°07′28″N 117°20′46″E
ZBTL	TGO	Tongliao Airport	Tongliao, Inner Mongolia	43°33′25″N 122°11′59″E
ZBTS	TVS	Tangshan Sannühe Airport	Tangshan, Hebei	39°43′31″N 117°59′36″E
ZBUC	UCB	Ulanqab Jining Airport	Ulanqab, Inner Mongolia	41°07′47″N 113°06′29″E
ZBUH	WUA	Wuhai Airport	Wuhai, Inner Mongolia	39°47′31″N 106°48′12″E
ZBUL	HLH	Ulanhot Airport	Ulanhot, Inner Mongolia	46°11′48″N 122°00′18″E
ZBXH	XIL	Xilinhot Airport	Xilinhot, Inner Mongolia	43°55′00″N 115°57′50″E
ZBXT	XNT	Xingtai Dalian Airport	Xingtai, Hebei	36°52′58″N 114°25′45″E
ZBXZ	WUT	Xinzhou Wutaishan Airport	Xinzhou, Shanxi	38°35′57″N 112°58′04″E
ZBYC	YCU	Yuncheng Guangong Airport	Yuncheng, Shanxi	35°07′00″N 111°02′23″E
ZBYN	TYN	Taiyuan Wusu International Airport	Taiyuan, Shanxi	37°44′49″N 112°37′42″E
ZBYZ	RLK	Bayannur Tianjitai Airport	Bayannur, Inner Mongolia	40°55′35″N 107°44′20″E
ZBZJ	ZQZ	Zhangjiakou Ningyuan Airport	Zhangjiakou, Hebei	40°44′19″N 114°55′49″E
ZBZL	NZL	Zhalantun Chengjisihan Airport	Zhalantun, Inner Mongolia	47°51′57″N 122°46′03″E

=== ZG - Southern China (Guangdong, Guangxi, Hunan) ===
ICAO	IATA	Airport name	Community	Coordinates
ZGBH	BHY	Beihai Fucheng Airport	Beihai, Guangxi	21°32′22″N 109°17′38″E
ZGBS	AEB	Baise Bama Airport	Baise, Guangxi	23°43′10″N 106°57′33″E
ZGCD	CGD	Changde Taohuayuan Airport	Changde, Hunan	28°55′08″N 111°38′24″E
ZGCJ	HJJ	Huaihua Zhijiang Airport	Huaihua, Hunan	27°26′29″N 109°41′59″E
ZGCS		Changsha Datuopu Airport	Changsha, Hunan	28°04′09″N 112°57′26″E
ZGCZ	HCZ	Chenzhou Beihu Airport	Chenzhou, Hunan	25°45′02″N 112°50′45″E
ZGDY	DYG	Zhangjiajie Hehua Airport	Zhangjiajie (Dayong), Hunan	29°06′11″N 110°26′36″E
ZGFS	FUO	Foshan Shadi Airport	Foshan, Guangdong	23°04′57″N 113°04′15″E
ZGGG	CAN	Guangzhou Baiyun International Airport	Guangzhou, Guangdong	23°23′33″N 113°17′56″E
ZGHA	CSX	Changsha Huanghua International Airport	Changsha, Hunan	28°11′48″N 113°13′15″E
ZGHC	HCJ	Hechi Jinchengjiang Airport	Hechi, Guangxi	24°47′02″N 107°41′59″E
ZGHY	HNY	Hengyang Nanyue Airport	Hengyang, Hunan	26°43′26″N 112°37′06″E
ZGHZ	HUZ	Huizhou Airport	Huizhou, Guangdong	23°02′54″N 114°36′01″E
ZGKL	KWL	Guilin Liangjiang International Airport	Guilin, Guangxi	25°13′10″N 110°02′22″E
ZGLG	LLF	Yongzhou Lingling Airport	Yongzhou, Hunan	26°20′44″N 111°36′44″E
ZGMX	MXZ	Meixian Airport	Meizhou, Guangdong	24°15′59″N 116°06′16″E
ZGNN	NNG	Nanning Wuxu International Airport	Nanning, Guangxi	22°36′30″N 108°10′21″E
ZGOW	SWA	Jieyang Chaoshan International Airport	Jieyang/Shantou, Guangdong	23°33′09″N 116°30′21″E
ZGSD	ZUH	Zhuhai Jinwan Airport	Zhuhai, Guangdong	22°00′25″N 113°22′34″E
ZGSG	HSC	Shaoguan Danxia Airport	Shaoguan, Guangdong	24°58′43″N 113°25′16″E
ZGSY	WGN	Shaoyang Wugang Airport	Shaoyang, Hunan	26°48′07″N 110°38′31″E
ZGSZ	SZX	Shenzhen Bao'an International Airport	Shenzhen, Guangdong	22°38′22″N 113°48′39″E
ZGWZ	WUZ	Wuzhou Xijiang Airport	Wuzhou, Guangxi	23°24′05″N 111°05′55″E
ZGXX	DXJ	Xiangxi Biancheng Airport	Xiangxi, Hunan	28°29′50″N 109°31′18″E
ZGYL	YLX	Yulin Fumian Airport	Yulin, Guangxi	22°26′17″N 110°07′15″E
ZGYY	YYA	Yueyang Sanhe Airport	Yueyang, Hunan	29°18′50″N 113°16′41″E
ZGZH	LZH	Liuzhou Bailian Airport	Liuzhou, Guangxi	24°12′27″N 109°23′28″E
ZGZJ	ZHA	Zhanjiang Wuchuan Airport	Zhanjiang, Guangdong	21°28′54″N 110°35′25″E

=== ZH - Central China (Henan, Hubei) ===
ICAO	IATA	Airport name	Community	Coordinates	Notes
ZHAY	AYN	Anyang Airport	Anyang, Henan	36°08′02″N 114°20′38″E	Military
ZHCC	CGO	Zhengzhou Xinzheng International Airport	Zhengzhou, Henan	34°31′11″N 113°50′27″E	
ZHEC	EHU	Ezhou Huahu Airport	Ezhou, Hubei	30°20′34″N 115°01′47″E	
ZHES	ENH	Enshi Xujiaping Airport	Enshi, Hubei	30°19′13″N 109°29′06″E	
ZHGH	LHK	Laohekou Guanghua Airport	Laohekou, Hubei	32°23′22″N 111°41′41″E	Military
ZHHH	WUH	Wuhan Tianhe Airport	Wuhan, Hubei	30°47′06″N 114°12′24″E	
ZHJZ	SHS	Jingzhou Shashi Airport	Jingzhou, Hubei	30°17′00″N 112°27′00″E	
ZHLY	LYA	Luoyang Beijiao Airport	Luoyang, Henan	34°44′28″N 112°23′18″E	
ZHNY	NNY	Nanyang Jiangying Airport	Nanyang, Henan	32°58′42″N 112°36′48″E	
ZHQQ	HQQ	Anyang Hongqiqu Airport	Anyang, Henan	35°52′15″N 114°27′43″E	
ZHSN	HPG	Shennongjia Hongping Airport	Shennongjia, Hubei	31°38′01″N 110°20′17″E	
ZHSS	SHS	Shashi Airport	Jingzhou, Hubei	30°19′20″N 112°16′46″E	
ZHSY	WDS	Shiyan Wudangshan Airport	Shiyan, Hubei	32°35′30″N 110°54′28″E	
ZHWT		Hankou Wangjiaddun Airport	Wuhan, Hubei	30°36′00″N 114°14′00″E	Closed
ZHXF	XFN	Xiangyang Liuji Airport	Xiangyang, Hubei	32°09′00″N 112°17′26″E	
ZHXY	XAI	Xinyang Minggang Airport	Xinyang, Henan	32°32′29″N 114°04′40″E	
ZHYC	YIH	Yichang Sanxia Airport	Yichang, Hubei	30°33′23″N 111°28′48″E	

=== ZJ - Hainan Island ===
ICAO	IATA	Airport name	Community	Coordinates
ZJHK	HAK	Haikou Meilan International Airport	Haikou, Hainan	19°56′05″N 110°27′32″E
ZJQH	BAR	Qionghai Bo'ao International Airport	Qionghai, Hainan	19°08′26″N 110°27′32″E
ZJSY	SYX	Sanya Phoenix International Airport	Sanya, Hainan	18°18′10″N 109°24′44″E
ZJYX	XYI	Yongxing Island Airport	Sansha, Hainan	16°50′01″N 112°20′42″E

=== ZL - Northwest China (Gansu, Ningxia, Qinghai, Shaanxi) ===
ICAO	IATA	Airport name	Community	Coordinates	Notes
ZLAK	AKA	Ankang Wulipu Airport	Ankang, Shaanxi	32°42′29″N 108°55′52″E	
ZLDH	DNH	Dunhuang Airport	Dunhuang, Gansu	40°09′43″N 094°48′44″E	
ZLDL	HXD	Delingha Airport	Delingha, Qinghai	37°07′30″N 097°16′07″E	
ZLGL	GMQ	Golog Maqin Airport	Golog, Qinghai	34°25′18″N 100°18′05″E	
ZLGM	GOQ	Golmud Airport	Golmud, Qinghai	36°24′02″N 094°47′10″E	
ZLGY	GYU	Guyuan Liupanshan Airport	Guyuan, Ningxia	36°04′34″N 106°13′05″E	
ZLHB	HBQ	Haibei Qilian Airport	Qilian, Qinghai	38°00′43″N 100°38′38″E	
ZLHX	HTT	Haixi Mangnai Airport	Mangnai, Qinghai	38°11′51″N 090°50′30″E	
ZLHZ	HZG	Hanzhong Chenggu Airport	Hanzhong, Shaanxi	33°08′12″N 107°12′08″E	
ZLIC	INC	Yinchuan Hedong International Airport	Yinchuan, Ningxia	38°19′18″N 106°23′33″E	
ZLJC	JIC	Jinchang Jinchuan Airport	Jinchang, Gansu	38°32′31″N 102°20′52″E	
ZLJQ	JGN	Jiayuguan Jiuquan Airport	Jiayuguan City, Gansu	39°51′25″N 098°20′29″E	
ZLLL	LHW	Lanzhou Zhongchuan International Airport	Lanzhou, Gansu	36°30′54″N 103°37′12″E	
ZLLN	LNL	Longnan Chengxian Airport	Longnan, Gansu	33°47′17″N 105°47′49″E	
ZLLT		Huxian Airport	Xi'an, Shaanxi	34°09′10″N 108°35′59″E	Military
ZLQY	IQN	Qingyang Airport	Qingyang, Gansu	35°47′59″N 107°36′10″E	
ZLSN	SIA	Xi'an Xiguan Airport	Xi'an, Shaanxi	34°14′56″N 108°53′42″E	Closed
ZLTS	THQ	Tianshui Maijishan Airport	Tianshui, Gansu	34°33′30″N 105°51′40″E	
ZLWW		Nanning Wuwei Airport	Wuwei, Gansu	37°59′24″N 102°33′59″E	Military
ZLXH	GXH	Gannan Xiahe Airport	Xiahe and Hezuo, Gansu	34°48′38″N 102°38′41″E	
ZLXN	XNN	Xining Caojiapu International Airport	Xining, Qinghai	36°31′39″N 102°02′34″E	
ZLXY	XIY	Xi'an Xianyang International Airport	Xi'an, Shaanxi	34°26′16″N 108°45′24″E	
ZLYA	ENY	Yan'an Nanniwan Airport	Yan'an, Shaanxi	36°28′35″N 109°27′55″E	
ZLYL	UYN	Yulin Yuyang Airport	Yulin, Shaanxi	38°21′40″N 109°35′47″E	
ZLYN		Yanliang Air Base	Xi'an, Shaanxi	34°38′35″N 109°14′29″E	
ZLYS	YUS	Yushu Batang Airport	Gyêgu, Yushu County, Qinghai	32°50′21″N 097°02′20″E	
ZLZW	ZHY	Zhongwei Shapotou Airport	Zhongwei, Ningxia	37°34′22″N 105°09′16″E	
ZLZY	YZY	Zhangye Ganzhou Airport	Zhangye, Gansu	38°48′07″N 100°40′30″E	

=== ZP - Yunnan ===
ICAO	IATA	Airport name	Community	Coordinates	Notes
ZPBS	BSD	Baoshan Yunrui Airport	Baoshan, Yunnan	25°03′12″N 099°10′06″E	
ZPCW	CWJ	Cangyuan Washan Airport	Cangyuan, Yunnan	23°16′17″N 099°22′05″E	
ZPDL	DLU	Dali Airport	Dali, Yunnan	25°39′04″N 100°19′06″E	
ZPDQ	DIG	Diqing Shangri-La Airport	Shangri-La County, Yunnan	27°47′36″N 099°40′38″E	
ZPJH	JHG	Xishuangbanna Gasa International Airport	Jinghong, Yunnan	21°58′26″N 100°45′35″E	
ZPJM	JMJ	Lancang Jingmai Airport	Lancang, Yunnan	22°24′57″N 099°47′11″E	
ZPLC	LNJ	Lincang Airport	Lincang, Yunnan	23°44′18″N 100°01′30″E	
ZPLJ	LJG	Lijiang Sanyi International Airport	Lijiang, Yunnan	26°40′45″N 100°14′45″E	
ZPMS	LUM	Dehong Mangshi Airport	Mangshi, Yunnan	24°24′00″N 098°32′00″E	Formerly ZPLX
ZPNL	NLH	Ninglang Luguhu Airport	Ninglang, Yunnan	27°32′38″N 100°45′27″E	
ZPPP	KMG	Kunming Changshui International Airport	Kunming, Yunnan	25°06′07″N 102°55′45″E	
ZPSM	SYM	Pu'er Simao Airport	Pu'er, Yunnan	22°47′36″N 100°57′32″E	
ZPTC	TCZ	Tengchong Tuofeng Airport	Tengchong, Yunnan	24°56′18″N 098°29′09″E	
ZPWS	WNH	Wenshan Puzhehei Airport	Wenshan City, Yunnan	23°33′49″N 104°20′01″E	
ZPYM	YUA	Yuanmou Airport	Chuxiong, Yunnan	25°44′16″N 101°52′53″E	Closed
ZPZT	ZAT	Zhaotong Airport	Zhaotong, Yunnan	27°19′40″N 103°45′24″E	

=== ZS - Eastern China (Shanghai, Anhui, Fujian, Jiangsu, Jiangxi, Shandong, Zhejiang) ===
ICAO	IATA	Airport name	Community	Coordinates	Notes
ZSAM	XMN	Xiamen Gaoqi International Airport	Xiamen, Fujian	24°32′39″N 118°07′40″E	
ZSAQ	AQG	Anqing Tianzhushan Airport	Anqing, Anhui	30°34′56″N 117°03′01″E	
ZSBA	BFY	Bengbu Tenghu Airport	Bengbu, Anhui	33°09′58″N 117°03′25″E	
ZSBB	BFU	Bengbu Airport	Bengbu, Anhui	32°50′51″N 117°19′13″E	
ZSBO	BZJ	Bozhou Airport	Bozhou, Anhui	33°33′37″N 115°54′33″E	
ZSCG	CZX	Changzhou Benniu Airport	Changzhou, Jiangsu	31°54′46″N 119°46′56″E	
ZSCN	KHN	Nanchang Changbei International Airport	Nanchang, Jiangxi	28°51′54″N 115°54′00″E	
ZSDY	DOY	Dongying Shengli Airport	Dongying, Shandong	37°30′37″N 118°47′04″E	
ZSFY	FUG	Fuyang Xiguan Airport	Fuyang, Anhui	32°52′55″N 115°44′04″E	
ZSFZ	FOC	Fuzhou Changle International Airport	Fuzhou, Fujian	25°56′06″N 119°39′48″E	
ZSGS	JGS	Ji'an Jinggangshan Airport	Ji'an, Jiangxi	26°51′27″N 114°44′14″E	Formerly ZSJA
ZSGZ	KOW	Ganzhou Huangjin Airport	Ganzhou, Jiangxi	25°51′06″N 114°46′36″E	
ZSHC	HGH	Hangzhou Xiaoshan International Airport	Hangzhou, Zhejiang	30°14′14″N 120°25′55″E	
ZSHZ	HZA	Heze Mudan Airport	Heze, Shandong	35°12′48″N 115°44′12″E	
ZSJD	JDZ	Jingdezhen Luojia Airport	Jingdezhen, Jiangxi	29°20′19″N 117°10′33″E	
ZSJG	JNG	Jining Qufu Airport	Jining, Shandong	35°17′34″N 116°20′48″E	
ZSJH	JUH	Chizhou Jiuhuashan Airport	Chizhou, Anhui	30°44′25″N 117°41′12″E	
ZSJJ	JIU	Jiujiang Lushan Airport	Jiujiang, Jiangxi	29°28′37″N 115°48′04″E	Military operations use code ZSLS
ZSJN	TNA	Jinan Yaoqiang International Airport	Jinan, Shandong	36°51′26″N 117°12′58″E	
ZSJU	JUZ	Quzhou Airport	Quzhou, Zhejiang	28°57′57″N 118°53′58″E	
ZSJX	JNH	Jiaxing Nanhu Airport	Jiaxing, Zhejiang	30°42′24″N 120°40′50″E	
ZSLG	LYG	Lianyungang Baitabu Airport	Lianyungang, Jiangsu	34°34′18″N 118°52′25″E	
ZSLI	LIJ	Lishui Airport	Lishui, Zhejiang	28°22′15″N 119°50′05″E	
ZSLO	LCX	Longyan Guanzhishan Airport	Longyan, Fujian	25°40′27″N 116°44′47″E	Formerly ZSLD; Military operations use code ZBSZ
ZSLQ	HYN	Taizhou Luqiao Airport	Taizhou, Zhejiang	28°33′44″N 121°25′43″E	
ZSLT		Longtien Air Base	Fuzhou, Fujian	25°34′22″N 119°27′41″E	
ZSLY	LYI	Linyi Shubuling Airport	Linyi, Shandong	35°02′46″N 118°24′42″E	
ZSNB	NGB	Ningbo Lishe International Airport	Ningbo, Zhejiang	29°49′36″N 121°27′43″E	
ZSNJ	NKG	Nanjing Lukou International Airport	Nanjing, Jiangsu	31°44′32″N 118°51′43″E	
ZSNT	NTG	Nantong Xingdong International Airport	Nantong, Jiangsu	32°04′15″N 120°58′32″E	
ZSOF	HFE	Hefei Xinqiao International Airport	Hefei, Anhui	31°59′12″N 116°58′30″E	
ZSPD	PVG	Shanghai Pudong International Airport	Shanghai	31°08′36″N 121°48′19″E	
ZSQD	TAO	Qingdao Jiaodong International Airport	Qingdao, Shandong	36°21′43″N 120°05′18″E	
ZSQZ	JJN	Quanzhou Jinjiang Airport	Quanzhou, Fujian	24°47′56″N 118°35′22″E	
ZSRG	RUG	Rugao Air Base	Nantong, Jiangsu	32°15′25″N 120°30′01″E	
ZSRJ	JRJ	Ganzhou Ruijin Airport	Ganzhou, Jiangxi	25°57′39″N 116°04′39″E	
ZSRZ	RIZ	Rizhao Shanzihe Airport	Rizhao, Shandong	35°23′59″N 119°19′00″E	
ZSSH	HIA	Huai'an Lianshui International Airport	Huai'an, Jiangsu	33°47′26″N 119°07′30″E	
ZSSL		Shanghai Longhua Airport	Shanghai	31°10′01″N 121°27′13″E	Closed
ZSSM	SQJ	Sanming Shaxian Airport	Sanming, Fujian	26°25′41″N 117°50′42″E	
ZSSR	SQD	Shangrao Sanqingshan Airport	Shangrao, Jiangxi	28°22′49″N 117°57′41″E	
ZSSS	SHA	Shanghai Hongqiao International Airport	Shanghai	31°11′53″N 121°20′11″E	
ZSSZ	SZV	Suzhou Guangfu Airport	Suzhou, Jiangsu	31°15′47″N 120°24′02″E	
ZSTX	TXN	Huangshan Tunxi International Airport	Huangshan, Anhui	29°43′48″N 118°15′10″E	
ZSWA	WHA	Wuhu Xuanzhou Airport	Wuhu, Anhui	31°06′16″N 118°40′02″E	
ZSWF	WEF	Weifang Airport	Weifang, Shandong	36°38′49″N 119°07′07″E	
ZSWH	WEH	Weihai Dashuibo Airport	Weihai, Shandong	37°11′13″N 122°13′44″E	
ZSWU	WHU	Wuhu Wanli Airport	Wuhu, Anhui	31°23′26″N 118°24′34″E	
ZSWX	WUX	Sunan Shuofang International Airport	Wuxi and Suzhou, Jiangsu	31°29′40″N 120°25′46″E	
ZSWY	WUS	Wuyishan Airport	Wuyishan and Nanping, Fujian	27°42′03″N 118°00′01″E	
ZSWZ	WNZ	Wenzhou Longwan International Airport	Wenzhou, Zhejiang	27°54′43″N 120°51′07″E	
ZSXZ	XUZ	Xuzhou Guanyin Airport	Xuzhou, Jiangsu	34°03′33″N 117°33′19″E	
ZSYA	YTY	Yangzhou Taizhou International Airport	Yangzhou and Taizhou, Jiangsu	32°33′42″N 119°42′54″E	
ZSYC	YIC	Yichun Mingyueshan Airport	Yichun, Jiangxi	27°48′12″N 114°18′29″E	
ZSYN	YNZ	Yancheng Nanyang International Airport	Yancheng, Jiangsu	33°25′33″N 120°12′11″E	
ZSYT	YNT	Yantai Penglai International Airport	Yantai, Shandong	37°39′26″N 120°59′14″E	
ZSYW	YIW	Yiwu Airport	Yiwu, Zhejiang	29°20′41″N 120°01′56″E	
ZSZF	ZZH	Zaozhuang Yiyun Airport	Zaozhuang, Shandong	34°54′27″N 117°24′29″E	
ZSZS	HSN	Zhoushan Putuoshan International Airport	Zhoushan, Zhejiang	29°56′03″N 122°21′44″E	

=== ZU - Southwest China (Chongqing, Guizhou, Sichuan, Tibet) ===
ICAO	IATA	Airport name	Community	Coordinates	Notes
ZUAL	NGQ	Ngari Gunsa Airport	Shiquanhe, Tibet Autonomous Region	32°06′31″N 080°03′10″E	
ZUAS	AVA	Anshun Huangguoshu Airport	Anshun, Guizhou	26°15′38″N 105°52′23″E	
ZUBD	BPX	Qamdo Bamda Airport	Qamdo, Tibet Autonomous Region	30°33′13″N 097°06′31″E	
ZUBJ	BFJ	Bijie Feixiong Airport	Bijie, Guizhou	27°16′00″N 105°28′45″E	
ZUBZ	BZX	Bazhong Enyang Airport	Bazhong, Sichuan	31°44′17″N 106°38′42″E	
ZUCK	CKG	Chongqing Jiangbei International Airport	Chongqing	29°43′09″N 106°38′30″E	
ZUDA	DZH	Dazhou Jinya Airport	Dazhou, Sichuan	31°02′55″N 107°26′10″E	
ZUDC	DCY	Daocheng Yading Airport	Daocheng, Sichuan	29°19′23″N 100°03′12″E	
ZUDJ	DEJ	Tongren Dejiang Airport	Tongren, Guizhou	28°07′16″N 108°09′47″E	
ZUDR	DDR	Shigatse Tingri Airport	Tingri County, Xigazê, Tibet Autonomous Region	28°36′09″N 086°48′37″E	
ZUDX	DAX	Dazhou Heshi Airport	Dazhou, Sichuan	31°07′52″N 107°25′48″E	
ZUDZ	DZU	Dazu Air Base	Dazu, Chongqing	29°38′11″N 105°46′25″E	
ZUGH	GHN	Guanghan Airport	Guanghan, Sichuan	30°56′52″N 104°19′47″E	
ZUGU	GYS	Guangyuan Panlong Airport	Guangyuan, Sichuan	32°23′28″N 105°42′07″E	
ZUGY	KWE	Guiyang Longdongbao International Airport	Guiyang, Guizhou	26°32′19″N 106°48′03″E	
ZUGZ	GZG	Garze Gesar Airport	Garzê, Sichuan	31°45′27″N 099°33′15″E	
ZUHY	AHJ	Ngawa Hongyuan Airport	Hongyuan, Sichuan	32°31′45″N 102°21′25″E	
ZUJZ	JZH	Jiuzhai Huanglong Airport	Jiuzhaigou, Sichuan	32°51′15″N 103°41′07″E	
ZUKD	KGT	Kangding Airport	Kangding, Sichuan	30°09′27″N 101°44′05″E	
ZUKJ	KJH	Kaili Huangping Airport	Kaili, Guizhou	26°58′27″N 107°58′50″E	
ZULA	LZG	Langzhong Gucheng Airport	Langzhong, Sichuan	31°30′13″N 106°02′07″E	
ZULB	LLB	Qiannan Libo Airport	Libo, Guizhou	25°27′09″N 107°57′42″E	
ZULP	LIA	Liangping Airport	Liangping, Chongqing	30°40′46″N 107°47′10″E	
ZULS	LXA	Lhasa Gonggar Airport	Lhasa, Tibet Autonomous Region	29°17′52″N 090°54′43″E	
ZULZ	LZO	Luzhou Yunlong Airport	Luzhou, Sichuan	29°01′48″N 105°28′12″E	
ZUMT	WMT	Zunyi Maotai Airport	Renhuai, Zunyi, Guizhou	27°58′05″N 106°26′20″E	
ZUMY	MIG	Mianyang Nanjiao Airport	Mianyang, Sichuan	31°25′48″N 104°44′23″E	
ZUNC	NAO	Nanchong Gaoping Airport	Nanchong, Sichuan	30°47′38″N 106°09′35″E	
ZUNP	HZH	Liping Airport	Liping, Guizhou	26°19′22″N 109°09′06″E	
ZUNZ	LZY	Nyingchi Mainling Airport	Nyingchi, Tibet Autonomous Region	29°18′12″N 094°20′07″E	
ZUPL	APJ	Ngari Burang Airport	Burang, Tibet Autonomous Region	30°23′51″N 081°08′19″E	
ZUPS	LPF	Liupanshui Yuezhao Airport	Liupanshui, Guizhou	26°36′34″N 104°58′44″E	
ZUQJ	JIQ	Qianjiang Wulingshan Airport	Qianjiang, Chongqing	29°30′42″N 108°50′07″E	
ZURK	RKZ	Shigatse Peace Airport	Shigatse, Tibet Autonomous Region	29°21′06″N 089°18′25″E	
ZUSH	LGZ	Shannan Longzi Airport	Shannan, Tibet Autonomous Region	28°25′21″N 092°20′40″E	
ZUTC	TCZ	Tengchong Tuofeng Airport	Tengchong, Yunnan	24°56′18″N 098°29′09″E	
ZUTF	TFU	Chengdu Tianfu International Airport	Chengdu, Sichuan	30°19′08″N 104°26′42″E	
ZUTR	TEN	Tongren Fenghuang Airport	Tongren, Guizhou	27°53′00″N 109°18′32″E	
ZUUU	CTU	Chengdu Shuangliu International Airport	Chengdu, Sichuan	30°34′42″N 103°56′49″E	
ZUWL	CQW	Chongqing Xiannüshan Airport	Wulong, Chongqing	29°27′57″N 107°41′32″E	
ZUWN	WNJ	Weining Caohai Airport	Bijie, Guizhou	26°51′51″N 104°20′24″E	Not yet open
ZUWS	WSK	Chongqing Wushan Airport	Wushan, Chongqing	31°03′50″N 109°42′22″E	
ZUWX	WXN	Wanzhou Wuqiao Airport	Wanzhou, Chongqing	30°47′52″N 108°25′53″E	
ZUXC	XIC	Xichang Qingshan Airport	Xichang, Sichuan	27°59′21″N 102°11′04″E	
ZUXJ		Xinjin Airport	Xinjin, Sichuan	30°25′13″N 103°50′41″E	
ZUYB	YBP	Yibin Wuliangye Airport	Yibin, Sichuan	28°51′29″N 104°31′30″E	
ZUYI	ACX	Xingyi Wanfenglin Airport	Xingyi, Guizhou	25°05′18″N 104°57′31″E	
ZUZH	PZI	Panzhihua Baoanying Airport	Panzhihua, Sichuan	26°32′32″N 101°47′55″E	
ZUZY	ZYI	Zunyi Xinzhou Airport	Zunyi, Guizhou	27°48′40″N 107°14′46″E	

=== ZW - Xinjiang ===
ICAO	IATA	Airport name	Community	Coordinates	Notes
ZWAK	AKU	Aksu Hongqipo Airport	Aksu, Xinjiang	41°15′45″N 080°17′30″E	
ZWAL	ACF	Aral Talim Airport	Aral, Xinjiang	40°26′06″N 081°15′45″E	
ZWAT	AAT	Altay Xuedu Airport	Altay, Xinjiang	47°45′01″N 088°05′04″E	
ZWBL	BPL	Bole Alashankou Airport	Bole, Xinjiang	44°53′42″N 082°17′59″E	
ZWCM	IQM	Qiemo Yudu Airport	Qiemo, Xinjiang	38°14′01″N 085°27′56″E	
ZWFY	FYN	Fuyun Koktokay Airport	Fuyun, Xinjiang	46°48′04″N 089°32′18″E	
ZWHJ	HJB	Hejing Bayinbuluke Airport	Hejing, Xinjiang	42°58′36″N 083°58′22″E	
ZWHM	HMI	Hami Yizhou Airport	Hami, Xinjiang	42°50′33″N 093°40′10″E	
ZWHZ	SHF	Shihezi Huayuan Airport	Shihezi, Xinjiang	44°14′30″N 085°53′28″E	
ZWKC	KCA	Kuqa Qiuci Airport	Kuqa, Xinjiang	41°43′05″N 082°59′13″E	
ZWKL	KRL	Korla Licheng Airport	Korla, Xinjiang	41°36′59″N 086°08′35″E	
ZWKM	KRY	Karamay Guhai Airport	Karamay, Xinjiang	45°27′59″N 084°57′09″E	
ZWKN	KJI	Burqin Kanas Airport	Burqin County, Xinjiang	48°13′16″N 086°59′53″E	
ZWLK	DHH	Barkol Dahe Airport	Barkol, Xinjiang	43°45′17″N 093°07′52″E	
ZWML		Uxxaktal Air Base	Bayingolin, Xinjiang	42°10′51″N 087°11′11″E	
ZWNL	NLT	Xinyuan Nalati Airport	Xinyuan County, Xinjiang	43°25′59″N 083°22′49″E	
ZWQT	JBK	Qitai Jiangbulake Airport	Changji, Xinjiang	44°10′59″N 089°35′40″E	
ZWRQ	RQA	Ruoqiang Loulan Airport	Ruoqiang County, Xinjiang	38°58′29″N 088°00′30″E	
ZWSC	QSZ	Shache Airport	Yarkant County (Shache), Xinjiang	38°14′42″N 077°03′36″E	
ZWSH	KHG	Kashgar Airport	Kashgar, Xinjiang	39°32′35″N 076°01′12″E	
ZWSS	SXJ	Shanshan Airport	Shanshan, Xinjiang	42°54′42″N 090°14′51″E	
ZWTC	TCG	Tacheng Qianquan Airport	Tacheng, Xinjiang	46°40′21″N 083°20′27″E	
ZWTK	HQL	Tashkurgan Khunjerab Airport	Taxkorgan Tajik Autonomous County, Xinjiang	37°39′46″N 075°17′32″E	
ZWTL	TLQ	Turpan Jiaohe Airport	Turpan, Xinjiang	43°01′50″N 089°06′02″E	Formerly ZWTP
ZWTN	HTN	Hotan Kungang Airport	Hotan, Xinjiang	37°02′19″N 079°51′54″E	
ZWTS	TWC	Tumxuk Tangwangcheng Airport	Tumxuk, Xinjiang	39°53′17″N 079°13′55″E	
ZWWW	URC	Urumqi Diwopu International Airport	Urumqi, Xinjiang	43°54′26″N 087°28′27″E	
ZWYN	YIN	Yining Airport	Yining, Xinjiang	43°57′21″N 081°19′49″E	
ZWYT	YTW	Yutian Wanfang Airport	Yutian County, Xinjiang	36°48′39″N 081°46′51″E	
ZWZS	ZFL	Zhaosu Tianma Airport	Zhaosu County, Xinjiang	43°06′27″N 081°09′38″E	

=== ZY - Inner Manchuria (Heilongjiang, Jilin, Liaoning) ===
ICAO	IATA	Airport name	Community	Coordinates	Notes
ZYAS	AOG	Anshan Teng'ao Airport	Anshan, Liaoning	41°06′17″N 122°51′21″E	
ZYBA	DBC	Baicheng Chang'an Airport	Baicheng, Jilin	45°30′19″N 123°01′11″E	
ZYBS	NBS	Baishan Changbaishan Airport	Baishan, Jilin	42°03′59″N 127°36′24″E	
ZYCC	CGQ	Changchun Longjia International Airport	Changchun, Jilin	43°59′46″N 125°41′07″E	
ZYCH	CNI	Changhai Dachangshandao Airport	Changhai, Liaoning	39°15′59″N 122°40′01″E	
ZYCY	CHG	Chaoyang Airport	Chaoyang, Liaoning	41°32′17″N 120°26′06″E	
ZYDD	DDG	Dandong Langtou Airport	Dandong, Liaoning	40°01′33″N 124°17′13″E	
ZYDQ	DQA	Daqing Sartu Airport	Daqing, Heilongjiang	46°44′47″N 125°07′56″E	
ZYDU	DTU	Wudalianchi Dedu Airport	Wudalianchi, Heilongjiang	48°26′42″N 126°07′59″E	
ZYFY	FYJ	Fuyuan Dongji Airport	Fuyuan, Heilongjiang	45°37′24″N 126°15′01″E	
ZYHB	HRB	Harbin Taiping International Airport	Harbin, Heilongjiang	45°37′24″N 126°15′01″E	
ZYHE	HEK	Heihe Aihui Airport	Heihe, Heilongjiang	50°10′20″N 127°18′31″E	
ZYJD	JGD	Daxing'anling Oroqen Airport	Jiagedaqi, Heilongjiang	50°22′17″N 124°07′03″E	
ZYJL	JIL	Jilin Ertaizi Airport	Jilin City, Jilin	44°00′08″N 126°23′44″E	
ZYJM	JMU	Jiamusi Dongjiao Airport	Jiamusi, Heilongjiang	46°50′36″N 130°27′55″E	
ZYJS	JSJ	Jiansanjiang Shidi Airport	Jiansanjiang, Heilongjiang	47°06′36″N 132°39′37″E	
ZYJX	JXA	Jixi Xingkaihu Airport	Jixi, Heilongjiang	45°17′59″N 131°10′46″E	
ZYJZ	JNZ	Jinzhou Jinzhouwan Airport	Jinzhou, Liaoning	40°55′48″N 121°16′48″E	
ZYLD	LDS	Yichun Lindu Airport	Yichun, Heilongjiang	47°45′07″N 129°01′08″E	
ZYLY		Liaoyang Tiexi Airport	Liaoyang, Liaoning	41°16′41″N 123°04′44″E	Military
ZYMD	MDG	Mudanjiang Hailang Airport	Mudanjiang, Heilongjiang	44°31′27″N 129°34′08″E	
ZYMH	OHE	Mohe Gulian Airport	Mohe, Heilongjiang	52°55′16″N 122°25′14″E	
ZYQQ	NDG	Qiqihar Sanjiazi Airport	Qiqihar, Heilongjiang	47°14′23″N 123°55′05″E	
ZYSD	HSF	Suifenhe Dongning Airport	Suifenhe, Heilongjiang	44°27′14″N 130°50′38″E	
ZYSQ	YSQ	Songyuan Chaganhu Airport	Songyuan, Jilin	44°56′17″N 124°33′01″E	
ZYTL	DLC	Dalian Zhoushuizi International Airport	Dalian, Liaoning	38°57′56″N 121°32′18″E	
ZYTN	TNH	Tonghua Sanyuanpu Airport	Tonghua, Jilin	42°02′52″N 125°44′00″E	
ZYTX	SHE	Shenyang Taoxian International Airport	Shenyang, Liaoning	41°38′24″N 123°29′01″E	
ZYXC	XEN	Xingcheng Airport	Xingcheng, Liaoning	40°34′45″N 120°41′54″E	
ZYYJ	YNJ	Yanji Chaoyangchuan International Airport	Yanji, Jilin	42°52′58″N 129°27′04″E	
ZYYK	YKH	Yingkou Lanqi Airport	Yingkou, Liaoning	40°32′27″N 122°21′26″E	
ZYYY		Dongta Airport	Shenyang, Liaoning	41°47′02″N 123°29′50″E	Military

== ZK - North Korea ==
Also see airport category and list.

ICAO	IATA	Airport name	Community	Coordinates
ZKHM	RGO	Orang Airport	Chongjin	41°25′45″N 129°38′54″E
ZKKK		Pyongyang Heliport Facility	Pyongyang	39°02′58″N 125°48′22″E
ZKPY	FNJ	Pyongyang International Airport	Pyongyang	39°13′26″N 125°40′12″E
ZKSC		Sunchon Airport	Sunchon	39°24′44″N 125°53′26″E
ZKSD	DSO	Sondok Airport	Chongpyong	39°44′50″N 127°28′29″E
ZKSE	YJS	Samjiyon Airport	Samjiyon	41°54′26″N 128°24′36″E
ZKUJ	UJU	Uiju Airfield	Uiju County	40°09′06″N 124°29′55″E
ZKWS	WOS	Kalma Airport	Wonsan	39°09′59″N 127°29′03″E

== ZM - Mongolia ==
Also see airport category and list.

ICAO	IATA	Airport name	Community	Coordinates	Notes
ZMAH	AVK	Arvaikheer Airport	Arvaikheer, Övörkhangai	46°15′09″N 102°47′57″E	
ZMAT	LTI	Altai Airport	Altai, Govi-Altai	46°22′33″N 096°13′09″E	
ZMBH	BYN	Bayankhongor Airport	Bayankhongor, Bayankhongor	46°10′14″N 100°42′00″E	
ZMBK		Bogd Khan Heliport	Khan Uul, Ulaanbataar	47°54′02″N 106°54′37″E	
ZMBN	UGA	Bulgan Airport	Bulgan, Bulgan	48°51′15″N 103°29′03″E	
ZMBR		Bulagtai Airstrip	Khan khongor, Ömnögovi Province	43°44′57″N 104°06′50″E	
ZMBS	HBU	Bulgan Airport (Khovd)	Bulgan, Khovd	46°06′06″N 091°34′55″E	
ZMBU	UUN	Baruun-Urt Airport	Baruun-Urt, Sükhbaatar	46°39′37″N 113°17′07″E	
ZMCD	COQ	Choibalsan Airport	Choibalsan, Dornod	48°08′08″N 114°38′46″E	
ZMCK	UBN	Chinggis Khaan International Airport	Sergelen, Töv	47°39′00″N 106°49′08″E	aka New Ulaanbaatar International Airport
ZMDA		Dadal Airport	Dadal, Khentii	49°00′54″N 111°30′28″E	
ZMDN	ULZ	Donoi Airport	Uliastai, Zavkhan	47°42′46″N 096°31′27″E	
ZMDZ	DLZ	Dalanzadgad Airport	Dalanzadgad, Ömnögovi	43°36′31″N 104°22′01″E	
ZMGT		Ovoot Airport	Ovoot Tolgoi / Nariin Sukhait, Ömnögovi	43°00′42″N 101°20′02″E	
ZMHG	HTM	Khatgal Airport	Khatgal, Khövsgöl	50°26′34″N 100°07′56″E	
ZMHH	KHR	Kharkhorin Airport	Kharkhorin, Övörkhangai	47°14′48″N 102°49′34″E	
ZMHU	HJT	Khujirt Airport	Khujirt, Övörkhangai	46°55′31″N 102°46′29″E	
ZMKB		Khanbumbat Airport	Oyuu Tolgoi, Ömnögovi	43°08′05″N 106°50′47″E	
ZMKD	HVD	Khovd Airport	Khovd, Khovd	47°57′41″N 091°37′33″E	
ZMMG	MXW	Mandalgovi Airport	Mandalgovi, Dundgovi	45°44′08″N 106°16′10″E	
ZMMN	MXV	Mörön Airport	Mörön, Khövsgöl	49°39′47″N 100°05′57″E	
ZMSF		Nalaikh Airstrip	Nalaikh, Ulaanbataar	47°46′23″N 107°26′16″E	
ZMSH		Sainshand Airport	Sainshand, Dornogovi	44°59′13″N 110°10′29″E	Military
ZMTG	TSZ	Tsetserleg Airport	Tsetserleg, Arkhangai	47°27′50″N 101°28′54″E	
ZMTL		Tosontsengel Airport	Tosontsengel, Zavkhan	48°44′21″N 098°17′24″E	
ZMTT		Tavan Tolgoi Airport	Tavan Tolgoi, Ömnögovi	43°46′25″N 105°34′44″E	
ZMUB	ULN	Buyant-Ukhaa International Airport (formerly Buyant Ukhaa Airport)	Ulaanbaatar	47°50′35″N 106°45′59″E	
ZMUG	ULO	Ulaangom Airport	Ulaangom, Uvs	50°04′02″N 091°56′16″E	
ZMUH	UNR	Öndörkhaan Airport	Öndörkhaan, Khentii	47°18′15″N 110°36′27″E	
ZMUL	ULG	Ölgii Airport	Ölgii, Bayan Ölgii	48°59′40″N 089°55′11″E	

== ZZ - Special ==
- ZZZZ – Used when no ICAO code exists

== See also ==
- List of airports in China
- List of the busiest airports in China
