= Hangard Airlines =

Mongolian charter airline

IATA	ICAO	Call sign
—	HGD	HANGARD
- Founded: 1992
- Ceased operations: 2001
- Hubs: Buyant-Ukhaa International Airport (ULN)
- Alliance: None
- Fleet size: 1
- Destinations: 5
- Parent company: Hangard Travel Agency
- Headquarters: Ulaanbaatar, Mongolia
- Key people: Unknown
- Website: unknown

Hangard Airlines was a privately owned Mongolian airline based in Ulaanbaatar. It operated charter flights inside Mongolia from its main base at Buyant-Ukhaa International Airport (ULN). It ceased all operations in 2001.

== History ==
The airline was established in 1992 by Hangard Travel Agency and started operations on 1 January 1993 using the Antonov 24. The airline ceased all operations in 2001. Their main base was Ulaanbaatar Chinggis Khaan International Airport.

== Destinations ==
Hangard operated the following services (as of February 2000):

- Mongolia
  - Altai (Altai Airport)
  - Arvaikheer (Arvaikheer Airport)
  - Baruun-Urt (Baruun-Urt Airport)
  - Dalanzadgad (Dalanzadgad Airport)
  - Khovd (Khovd Airport)
  - Bulgan, Khovd (Bulgan Airport, Khovd)
  - Mörön (Mörön Airport)
  - Tosontzengel, Zavkhan (Tosontsengel Airport)
  - Ölgii (Ölgii Airport)
  - Ulaanbaatar - Buyant-Ukhaa International Airport
  - Ulaangom (Ulaangom Airport)
  - Uliastai (Uliastai Airport)

== Fleet ==
The Hangard fleet consisted of a single Antonov 24B aircraft (MT-7048). The aircraft paint scheme suggests the aircraft is either an ex-Aeroflot or ex-MIAT Mongolian Airlines aircraft.
