= Khujirt Airport =

Airport in Khujirt, Övörkhangai, Mongolia

- IATA: HJT; ICAO: ZMHU

Summary
- Serves: Khujirt
- Location: Mongolia
- Coordinates: 46°55′31″N 102°46′29″E

Map
- Location in Mongolia

Runways
Direction	Length		Surface
Direction	m	ft	Surface
09/27	2,200	7,218	Grass

Khujirt Airport (IATA: HJT, ICAO: ZMHU) is an airport in Mongolia. The airport is located in Khujirt, capital of the province of Övörkhangai. It has a grass runway 09/27 2,200 m × 60 m (7,218 ft × 197 ft).

== Flights ==
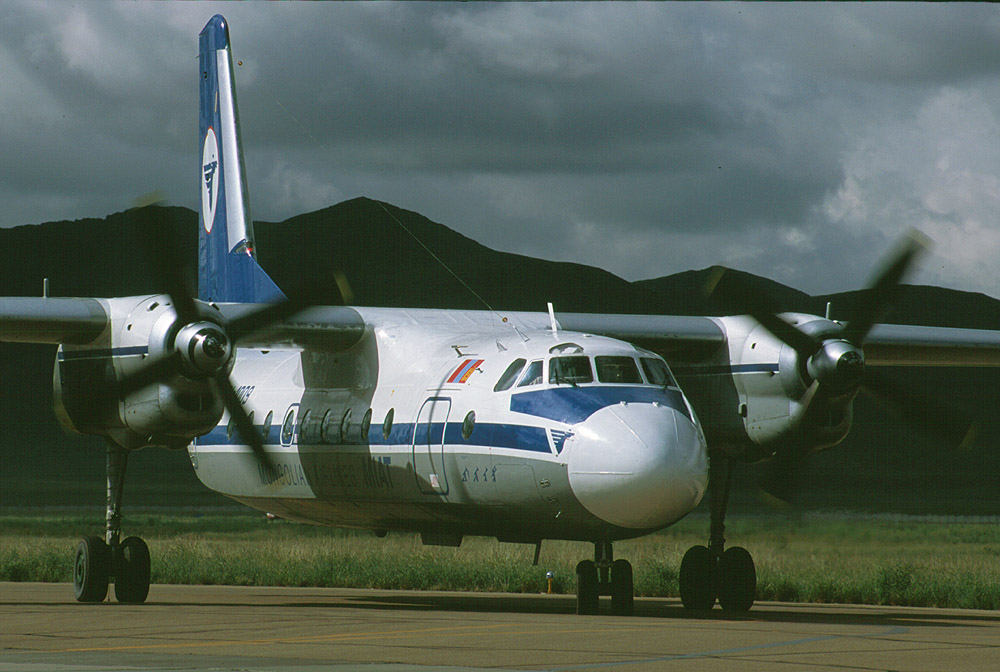
Antonov An-24 at Khujirt Airport

Since 2005 MIAT Mongolian Airlines stopped flying and gradually retiring their Antonov An-24 and Antonov An-26. After MIAT Mongolian Airlines Retired their An-24 and An-26's in mid-late 2008 Khujirt Airport had no official passenger flights. In early 2010 a Mongolian airline named Aero Mongolia made charter flights from Ulaanbaatar to 3 airports in Üvürkhangai these include Khujirt Airport, Kharkhorin Airport and Arvaikheer Airport. All flights were performed by an Fokker 50. In August 2010 the 3 flights were performed by 2 Fokker 50. From late August 2010 to April 2011 Aero Mongolia carried out almost 300 flights with 7.800 passengers from Buyant Ukhaa International Airport to the 3 charter routes in Üvürkhangai. In April 2012 Aero Mongolia halted all flights due to an incident that happened at Oyu-Tolgoi Airport. since 2012 Eznis Airways made flights to almost every airport in Mongolia with their Avro RJ-85 and Saab 340's. The airline carried over 9000 passengers from Ulaanbaatar to Khujirt Airport and almost 9100 passengers back to Ulaanbaatar. In mid-late 2014 Eznis Airways ceased all operations.

Since August 2023 there has been no scheduled flights operating to the airport. But there are 4 charter flights flying every month for medical purposes or a wildfire in the winter which the Dzud happens aid are delivered 7 flights are performed from December, January and February each respectively with Airbus H145 Mil Mi-8 helicopters and to be delivered to nearby provinces. Mongolian Air Force sometimes uses the airfield as an emergency fuel supply just in case this was proven effective as their Mi-171 are fueled low to fly with 1 stopover at Kharkhorin Airport or Khurjirt Airport to fly and train at Khovd Airport the Air Force's MiG-29 are preferred to Mürün Airport or Bulgan Airport as stopovers.

== See also ==
- List of airports in Mongolia
- MIAT Mongolian Airlines
- Eznis Airways
- Aero Mongolia
