= HJT =

HJT may refer to:

- Al Rais Cargo, an Emirati airline
- HijackThis, a malicious software removal tool
- Khujirt Airport, in Mongolia
- Heterojunction Technology, technology based on interface between dissimilar semiconductors
