= HGD =

HGD, or hgd, may refer to:

== Medical science ==
- Hymenoptera Genome Database, a resource supporting the genomics of Hymenoptera
- Homogentisate 1,2-dioxygenase, an enzyme which catalyzes the conversion of homogentisate to 4-maleylacetoacetate
- 2-hydroxymethylglutarate dehydrogenase (HgD), an enzyme belonging to the family of oxidoreductases

== Transport ==
- HGD, the Amtrak code for Huntingdon (Amtrak station), Pennsylvania, United States
- HGD, the IATA code for Hughenden Airport, Queensland, Australia
- HGD, the ICAO code for Hangard Airlines, a defunct Mongolian airline
- HGD, the National Rail code for Hungerford railway station in the county of Berkshire, UK
