= HBU =

HBU may refer to:

== Universities ==
- Hebei University, in China
- Hong Bang University. in Ho Chi Minh City, Vietnam
- Houston Baptist University, former name of the institution in Texas, United States now known as Houston Christian University

== Other uses ==
- Bulgan Airport, Khovd, in Mongolia
- Habun language, spoken in East Timor
- Hawke's Bay United FC, a New Zealand football club
- Herne Bay United, an English roller hockey club
- Highest and best use
- Hollandsche Bank-Unie, a defunct Dutch bank
