= BYN =

BYN may refer to:

- Bayankhongor Airport, Mongolia: IATA airport code BYN
- Belarusian ruble, by ISO 4217 currency code
- Bilen language: ISO language code BYN
- Bryan (Amtrak station), Ohio, United States: Amtrak station code BYN
- Bryn railway station, England, United Kingdom: National Rail station code BYN
