= List of airports in Mongolia =

Map

This is a list of airports in Mongolia, grouped by type and sorted by location.

== Airports ==
Airport names shown in bold indicate the airport has scheduled service on commercial airlines.

Airport name	City served	Type	Province	ICAO	IATA	Runway(s)	Coordinates
**Altai Airport**	Altai	Domestic	Govi-Altai	ZMAT	LTI	10/28: 2290m x 60m, grass	46°22′33″N 096°13′09″E
Arvaikheer Airport	Arvaikheer	Domestic	Övörhkangai	ZMAH	AVK	14/32: 2300m x 50m, grass	46°15′09″N 102°47′57″E
Baruun-Urt Airport	Baruun-Urt	Domestic	Sükhbaatar	ZMBU	UUN	18/36: 2200m x 50m, grass	46°39′37″N 113°17′07″E
Baruunturuun Airport	Baruunturuun	Domestic	Uvs			01/19: 2200m x 50m, grass	49°40′20.64″N 94°22′21″E
Bayankhongor Airport	Bayankhongor	Domestic	Bayankhongor	ZMBH	BYN	16L/34R: 2800m x 35m, asphalt/concrete 16R/34L: 2100m x 50m, grass	46°10′14″N 100°42′00″E
Bulgan Airport	Bulgan	Domestic	Bulgan	ZMBN	UGA	13/31: 1900m x 50m, grass	48°51′15″N 103°29′03″E
Bulgan Airport, Khovd	Bulgan, Khovd	Domestic	Khovd	ZMBS	HBU	17/35: 1800m x 40m, grass	46°06′06″N 091°34′55″E
Buyant-Ukhaa International Airport (formerly Chingis Khaan International Airport)	Ulaanbaatar	International	(capital)	ZMUB	ULN	14/32: 3100m x 60m, asphalt 15/33: 2000m x 40m, grass	47°50′35″N 106°45′59″E
**Chinggis Khaan International Airport**	Ulaanbaatar	International	Töv	ZMCK	UBN	3600 m x 45 m, concrete	47°39′00″N 106°49′08″E
Choibalsan Airport	Choibalsan	Domestic	Dornod	ZMCD	COQ	12/30: 2600m x 40m, concrete	48°08′08″N 114°38′46″E
Dadal Airport	Dadal	Domestic	Khentii	ZMDA		14/32: 1600m x 40m, unpaved	49°00′54″N 111°30′28″E
**Dalanzadgad Airport**	Dalanzadgad	Domestic	Ömnögovi	ZMDZ	DLZ	03/21: 2300m x 50m, concrete	43°36′31″N 104°22′01″E
**Donoi Airport**	Uliastai	Domestic	Zavkhan	ZMDN	ULZ	03/21: 2300m x 50m, concrete	47°42′46″N 96°31′27″E
**Khanbumbat Airport**	Oyuu Tolgoi	Domestic	Ömnögovi	ZMKB	n.a.	15/33: 3250m x 45m, concrete	43°08′05″N 106°50′47″E
Kharkhorin Airport	Kharkhorin	Domestic	Övörkhangai	ZMHH	KHR	01/19: 1800x x 50m, grass	47°14′48″N 102°49′34″E
Khatgal Airport	Khatgal	Domestic	Khövsgöl	ZMHG	HTM	15/33: 2400m x 30m, unpaved	50°26′33.72″N 100°07′56.28″E
**Khovd Airport**	Khovd	Domestic	Khovd	ZMKD	HVD	16L/34R: 2850m x 49m, asphalt/concrete 16R/34L: 2000m x 50m, grass	47°57′41″N 91°37′33″E
Khujirt Airport	Khujirt	Domestic	Övörkhangai	ZMHU	HJT	09/27: 2200m x 60m, grass	46°55′31″N 102°46′29″E
Mandalgovi Airport	Mandalgovi	Domestic	Dundgovi	ZMMG	MXW	18/36: 1800m x 40m, grass	45°44′08″N 106°16′10″E
**Mörön Airport**	Mörön	International	Khövsgöl	ZMMN	MXV	10L/28R: 2440m x 42m, asphalt/concrete 10R/28L: 2000m x 40m, gravel	49°39′47″N 100°05′57″E
**Ölgii Airport**	Ölgii	International	Bayan-Ölgii	ZMUL	ULG	13/31: 2850m x 30m, concrete	48°59′40″N 89°55′11″E
Öndörkhaan Airport	Öndörkhaan	Domestic	Khentii	ZMUH	UNR	06/24: 1800m x 50m, grass	47°18′15″N 110°36′27″E
**Ovoot Airport**	Ovoot Tolgoi / Nariin Sukhait	Domestic	Ömnögovi	ZMGT	n.a.	2220m x 30m, concrete	43°0′41.76″N 101°20′1.68″E
**Tavan Tolgoi Airport**	Tavan Tolgoi	Domestic	Ömnögovi	ZMTT	n.a.	2350m x 30m, grass	43°46′25″N 105°34′44″E
Tosontsengel Airport	Tosontsengel	Domestic	Zavkhaan	ZMTL	n.a.	10/28: 2400m x 50m, grass	48°44′21″N 98°17′24″E
Tsetserleg Airport	Tsetserleg	Domestic	Arkhangai	ZMTG	TSZ	14/32: 1650m x 35m, grass	47°27′50″N 101°28′54″E
**Ulaangom Airport**	Ulaangom	Domestic	Uvs	ZMUG	ULO	15/19: 2697m x 30m, concrete	50°04′02″N 91°56′16″E

== See also ==
- Transport in Mongolia
- List of airports by ICAO code: Z#ZM - Mongolia
- Wikipedia:WikiProject Aviation/Airline destination lists: Asia#Mongolia
