= Tavan Tolgoi Airport =

Airport in Ömnögovi, Mongolia

Tavan Tolgoi Airport Таван толгой нисэх буудал нисэх буудал
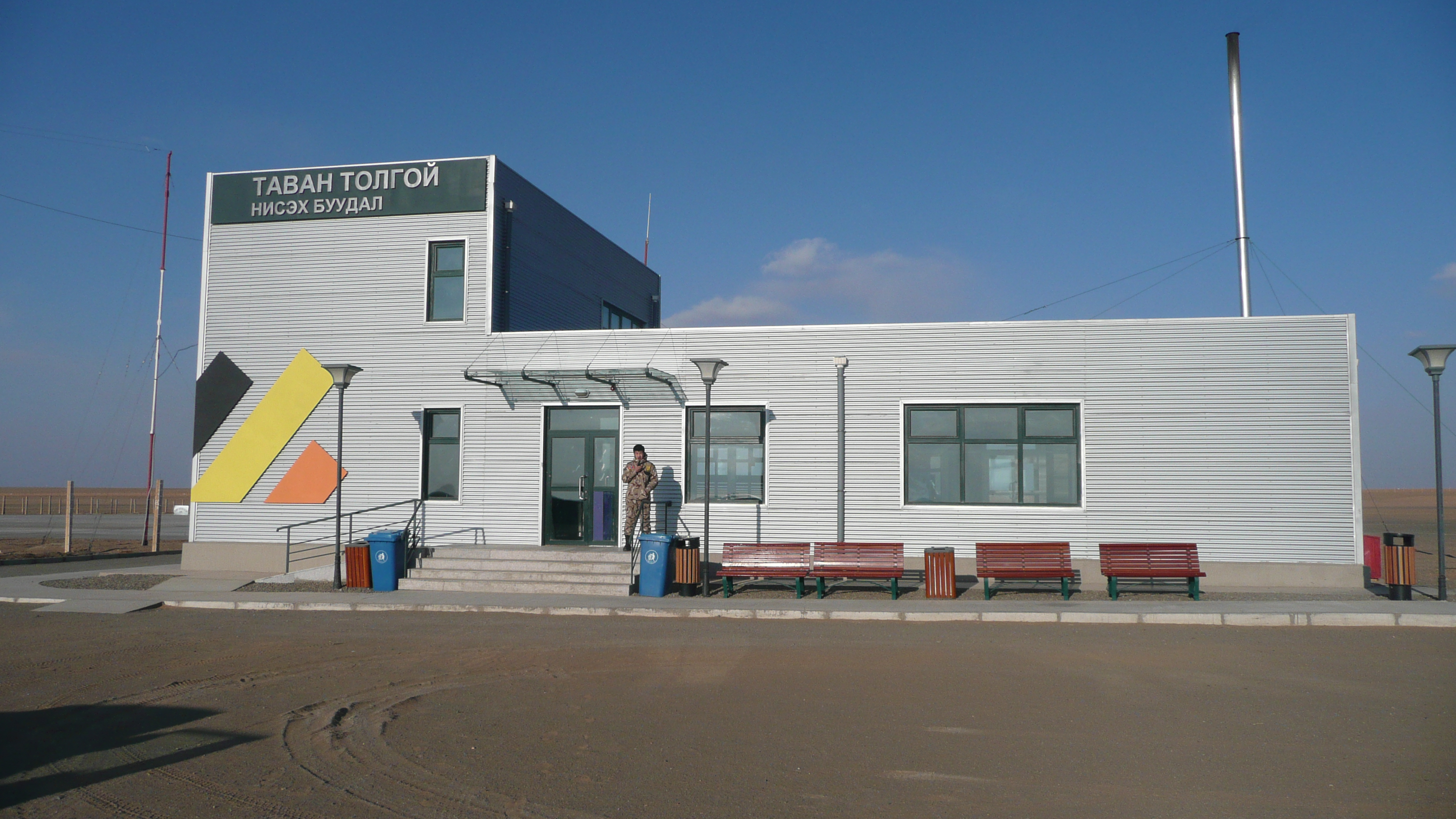
- IATA: none; ICAO: ZMTT

Summary
- Owner: Mongolian Mining Corporation
- Operator: Tavan Tolgoi Airport LLC
- Serves: Tavan Tolgoi
- Location: Tsogttsetsii, Ömnögovi, Mongolia
- Coordinates: 43°46′25″N 105°34′44″E
- Website: http://www.mmc.mn

Map
- Location in Mongolia ZMTT (Asia) ZMTT (Earth)

Runways
| Direction | Length | | Surface |
| Direction | m | ft | Surface |
|---|---|---|---|
| 14/32 | 2,350 | 7,710 | Asphalt |

Statistics (2013)
- Passengers: 18,600
- Sources: Civil Aviation Authority of Mongolia, MCS Group

Tavan Tolgoi Airport (Mongolian: Таван толгой нисэх буудал, Tavan tolgoi nisekh buudal) is an airport serving the Tavan Tolgoi mine in Tsogttsetsii, Ömnögovi, Mongolia. It was built in 2009 by Energy Resources LLC.

== Information ==
Tavan Tolgoi Airport is located 100 kilometers northeast of the regional capital of the Dalanzadgad, and 462 kilometers south of the national capital of Ulan Bator.

== See also ==
- List of airports in Mongolia
- List of airlines of Mongolia
