= Ovoot Airport =

Airport in Ömnögovi, Mongolia

Ovoot Airport Овоот нисэх буудал
- IATA: none; ICAO: ZMGT

Summary
- Airport type: Public
- Owner: SouthGobi Resources Ltd.
- Operator: SouthGobi Resources Ltd.
- Serves: Ovoot Tolgoi / Nariin Sukhait
- Location: Gurvan tes, Ömnögovi, Mongolia
- Elevation AMSL: 5,171 ft (1,576 m)
- Coordinates: 43°1′35″N 101°20′10″E
- Website: http://www.southgobi.com/s/home.asp

Map
- Location in Mongolia ZMGT (Asia) ZMGT (Earth)

Runways
Direction	Length		Surface
Direction	ft	m	Surface
18/36	7,283	2,219	Paved

Statistics (2013)
- Passengers: 10,100
- Sources: Civil Aviation Administration of Mongolia and the MCAA

Ovoot Airport (Mongolian: Овоот нисэх буудал) is an airport located at Ovoot Tolgoi / Nariin Sukhait, Ömnögovi Province, Mongolia. It handles domestic scheduled air traffic for the mining complex, and is served by several domestic scheduled passenger flights every week.

== Information ==
Ovoot Airport is located 320 kilometers southwest of the regional capital of the Dalanzadgad, and 950 kilometers south of the national capital of Ulan Bator.

== See also ==
- List of airports in Mongolia
- List of airlines of Mongolia
