= Aero Mongolia =

Mongolian airline

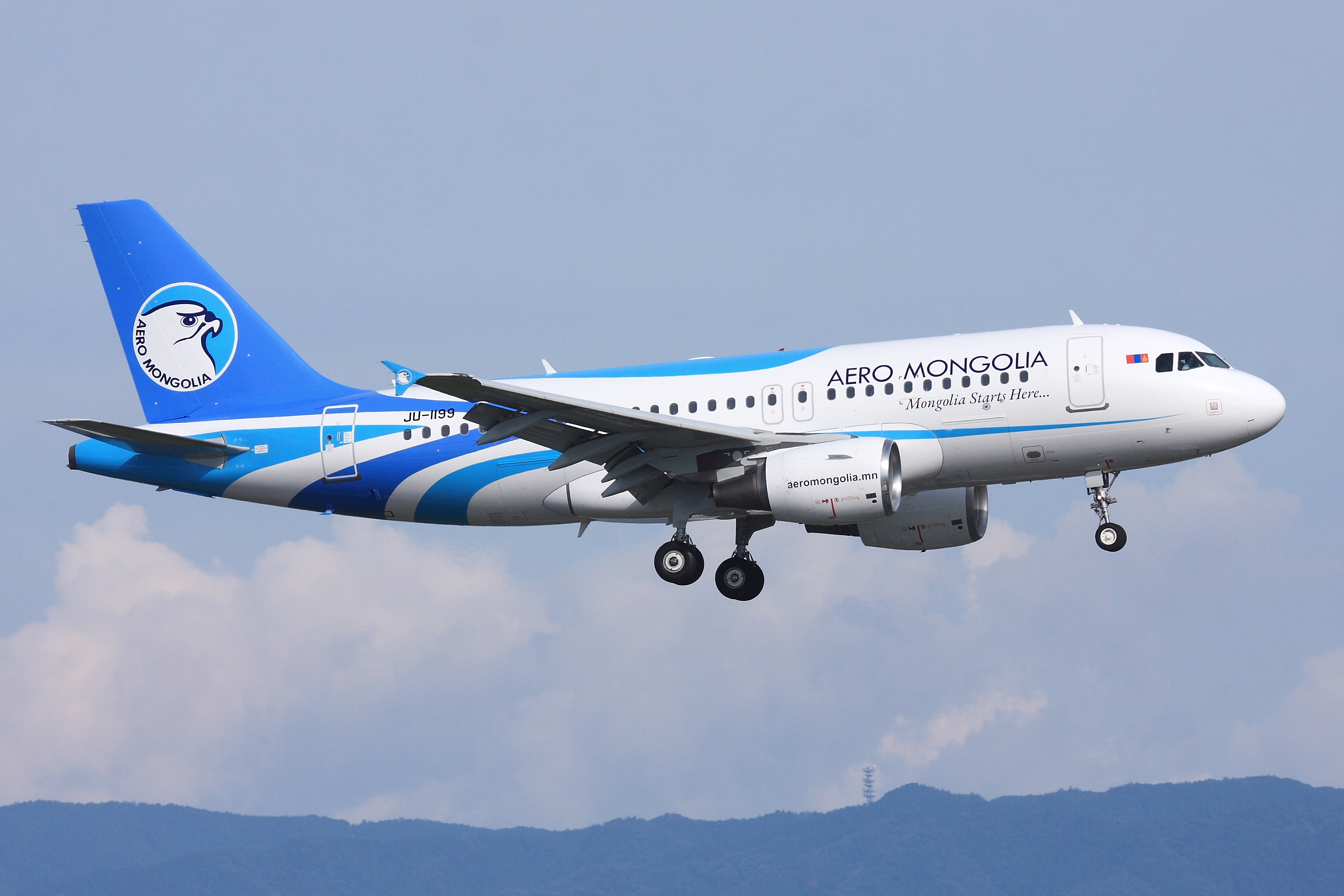
- Aero Mongolia A319
IATA	ICAO	Call sign
M0	MNG	AERO MONGOLIA
- Founded: 2001; 25 years ago
- Hubs: Chinggis Khaan International Airport
- Fleet size: 3
- Destinations: 3
- Parent company: Monnis Group
- Headquarters: 4F, Monnis Building, 18th khoroo, Khan-Uul district, Ulaanbaatar, Mongolia
- Key people: Chuluunbaatar Baz (CEO)
- Employees: 210
- Website: https://www.aeromongolia.com/

Aero Mongolia (Note: Mongolian: Аэро Монголиа, pronounced [áɪɾɞ mɔ́ɴɢɞɮʲə]) is one of the three national airlines of Mongolia. Its head office is on the fourth floor of Monnis Building in Ulaanbaatar. It operates international scheduled services to Tokyo, Japan and Seoul, Korea. Its main base is Chinggis Khaan International Airport.

== History ==
The airline was established in 2001 and operated its first domestic flight on 25 May 2003. As of December 2024, it employs over 200 staff members and operates scheduled flights to four international destinations, including Seoul, Tokyo, Hohhot, and Hanoi. It also provides charter flights to Jeju, Yangyang (South Korea), Phu Quoc, Da Nang, and Nha Trang. As of 2024, the airline's fleet consists of two Airbus A319 aircraft.

As part of its fleet modernization plan, it retired its Fokker 50 and Fokker 100 aircraft in 2018, followed by the retirement of two Embraer ERJ 145 in 2023. After merging with the Monnis Group in June 2007, Aero Mongolia undertook significant measures to strengthen its management, stabilize its financial position, and enhance flight safety. These efforts have supported the airline's continued growth and expansion into new markets.

== Destinations ==
As of May 2025, Aero Mongolia operated the following services:

Country	City	Airport	Notes	Refs
China	Hohhot	Hohhot Baita International Airport		
Japan	Tokyo	Narita International Airport		
Mongolia	Ulaanbaatar	Chinggis Khaan International Airport	Hub	
Philippines	Manila	Ninoy Aquino International Airport	Terminated	
Russia	Irkutsk	International Airport Irkutsk	Terminated	
South Korea	Jeju	Jeju International Airport	Terminated	
South Korea	Seoul	Incheon International Airport		
South Korea	Yangyang	Yangyang International Airport	Terminated	
Vietnam	Da Nang	Da Nang International Airport	Terminated	
Vietnam	Hanoi	Noi Bai International Airport	Terminated	
Vietnam	Nha Trang	Cam Ranh International Airport	Terminated	
Vietnam	Phu Quoc	Phu Quoc International Airport	Terminated	

== Fleet ==
=== Current fleet ===
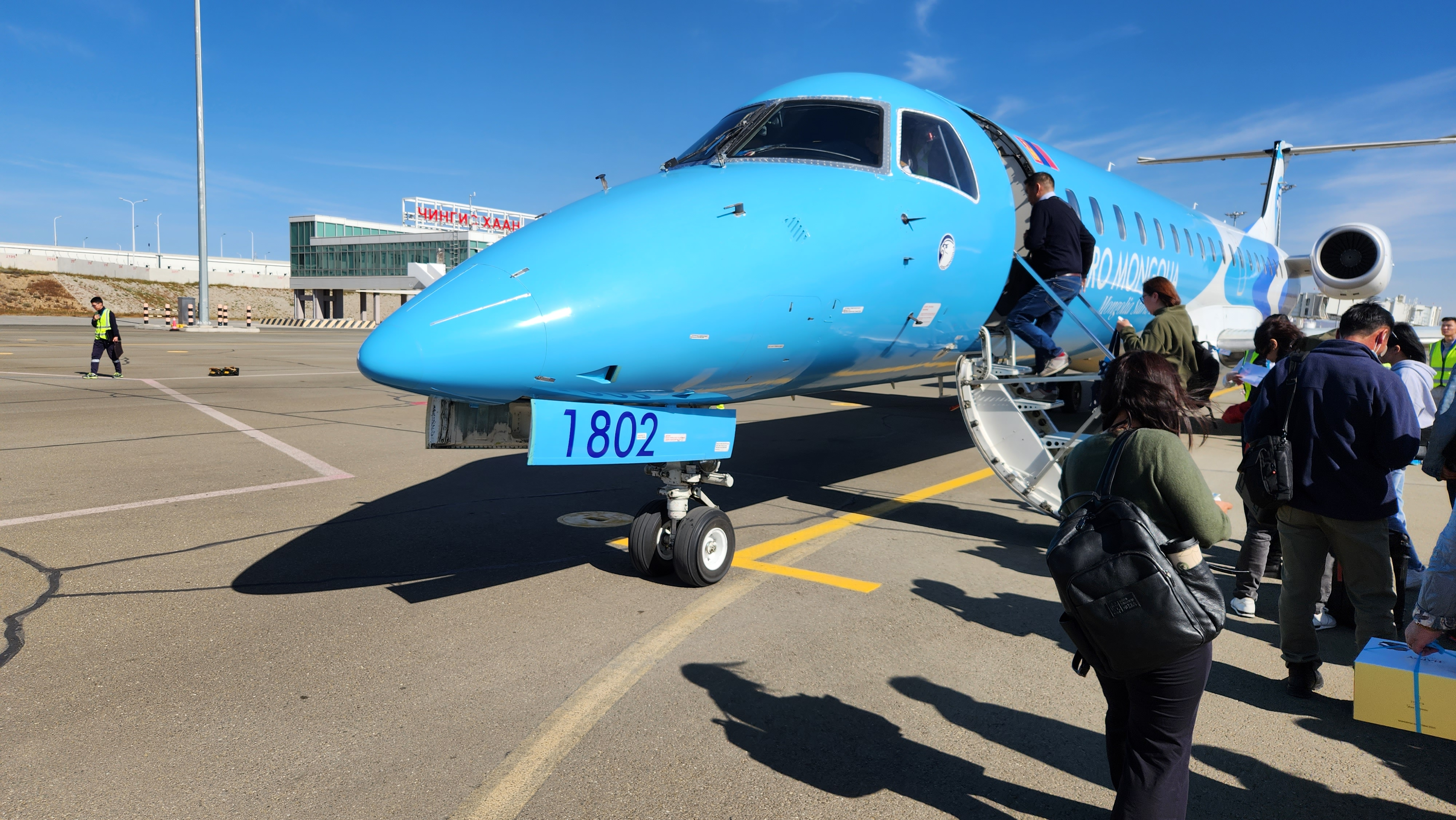
Embraer ERJ 145 at Chinggis Khaan International Airport

As of August 2025, Aero Mongolia operates the following aircraft:

Aero Mongolia fleet
Aircraft	In service	Order	Passengers			Notes
Aircraft	In service	Order	C	Y	Total	Notes
Airbus A319-100	2	—		143	143	
Total	2	0				

=== Former fleet ===
The airline fleet previously included the following aircraft:

Aero Mongolia retired fleet
Aircraft	Total	Year introduced	Year retired	Notes
Fokker 50	4	2003	2018	
Fokker 100	2	2005	2011	

== Frequent flyer program ==
SKYMILES is the frequent-flyer program of Aero Mongolia. "SKYMILES" also refers to the bonus card which Aero Mongolia's frequent flyers are given. The program enables passengers to collect 10 tugriks (MNT) from each km they fly. Savings will be automatically calculated (based on flight distance) and collected to passenger’s bonus card. Passengers can make use of their savings whenever they want.

== Incidents and accidents ==
On 31 October 2007, Mongolian aviation authorities suspended Aero Mongolia flights after the airline failed safety checks. In the first quarter of 2008, Aero Mongolia received the license to fly on domestic routes.

The airline's operations were suspended from January to May 2009 due to the Mongolian Civil Aviation's doubt of flight safety.

On 30 March 2012, a Fokker 50 (JU-8257) skidded off the runway during takeoff in Khanbumbat Airport, the right engine propeller was damaged due to colliding with the side runway lights. There were no injuries but the aircraft was written off.

== See also ==
- Transportation in Mongolia
- List of companies of Mongolia
- List of airlines of Mongolia
- List of airports in Mongolia
