= Dalanzadgad Airport =

Airport serving Dalanzadgad, Mongolia

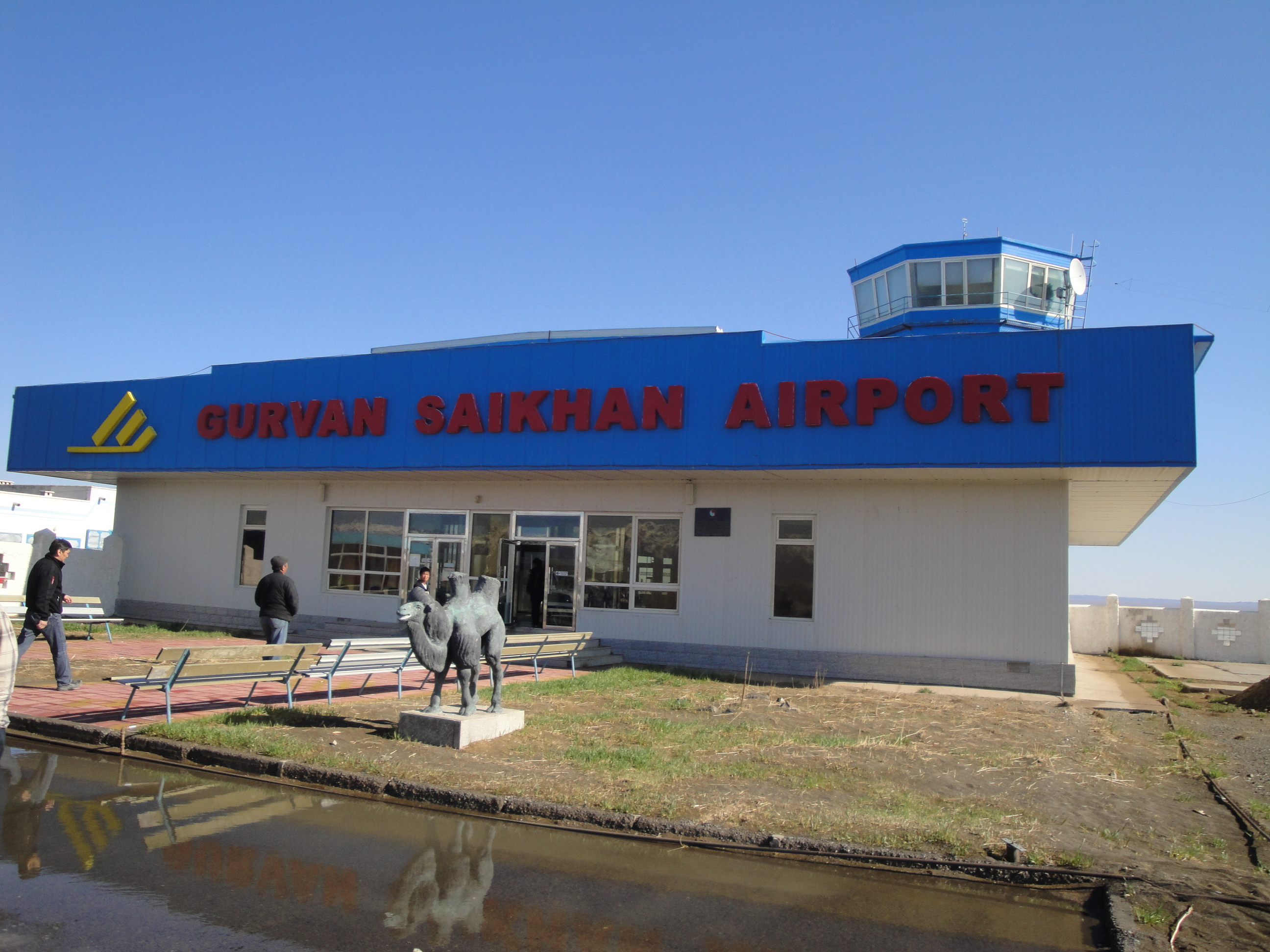
- IATA: DLZ; ICAO: ZMDZ

Summary
- Airport type: Joint (Civil and Military)
- Operator: Civil Aviation Authority of Mongolia
- Serves: Dalanzadgad, Ömnögovi Province, Mongolia
- Elevation AMSL: 1,457.9 m (4,783 ft)
- Coordinates: 43°36′31″N 104°22′01″E

Map
- Location of the airport in Mongolia DLZ (Asia) DLZ (Earth)

Runways
Direction	Length		Surface
Direction	m	ft	Surface
03/21	2,300	7,546	Asphalt

Statistics (2012 DLZ)
- Passengers: 40,000
- Sources: Civil Aviation Administration of Mongolia, GCM, STV

Dalanzadgad Airport (IATA: DLZ, ICAO: ZMDZ) is a public airport located in Dalanzadgad, the capital of Ömnögovi Province in Mongolia.

Although Dalanzadgad Airport is classified as an international airport, there are no scheduled flights outside Mongolia.

== Airlines and destinations ==
Airlines	Destinations
MIAT Mongolian Airlines	Ulaanbaatar

== See also ==
- List of airports in Mongolia
- List of airlines of Mongolia
