= Dadal Airport =

Airport in Dadal, Khenti, Mongolia

- The new Dadal Airport, with the old, wooden, building to the right
- IATA: none; ICAO: ZMDA

Summary
- Serves: Dadal
- Location: Mongolia
- Coordinates: 49°00′54″N 111°30′28″E

Map
- Location in Mongolia

Runways
Direction	Length		Surface
Direction	m	ft	Surface
14/32	1,600	5,249	unpaved

Dadal Airport (ICAO: ZMDA) is an airport in Mongolia. The airport is in Dadal, capital of the province of Khentii. It has an unpaved runway 14/32 1,600 m × 40 m (5,249 ft × 131 ft).

== See also ==
- List of airports in Mongolia
