= Altai Airport =

Airport in Altai, Govi-Altai, Mongolia

Altai Airport Алтай нисэх буудал ᠠᠯᠲᠠᠢ ᠨᠢᠰᠬᠦ ᠪᠠᠭᠤᠳᠠᠯ
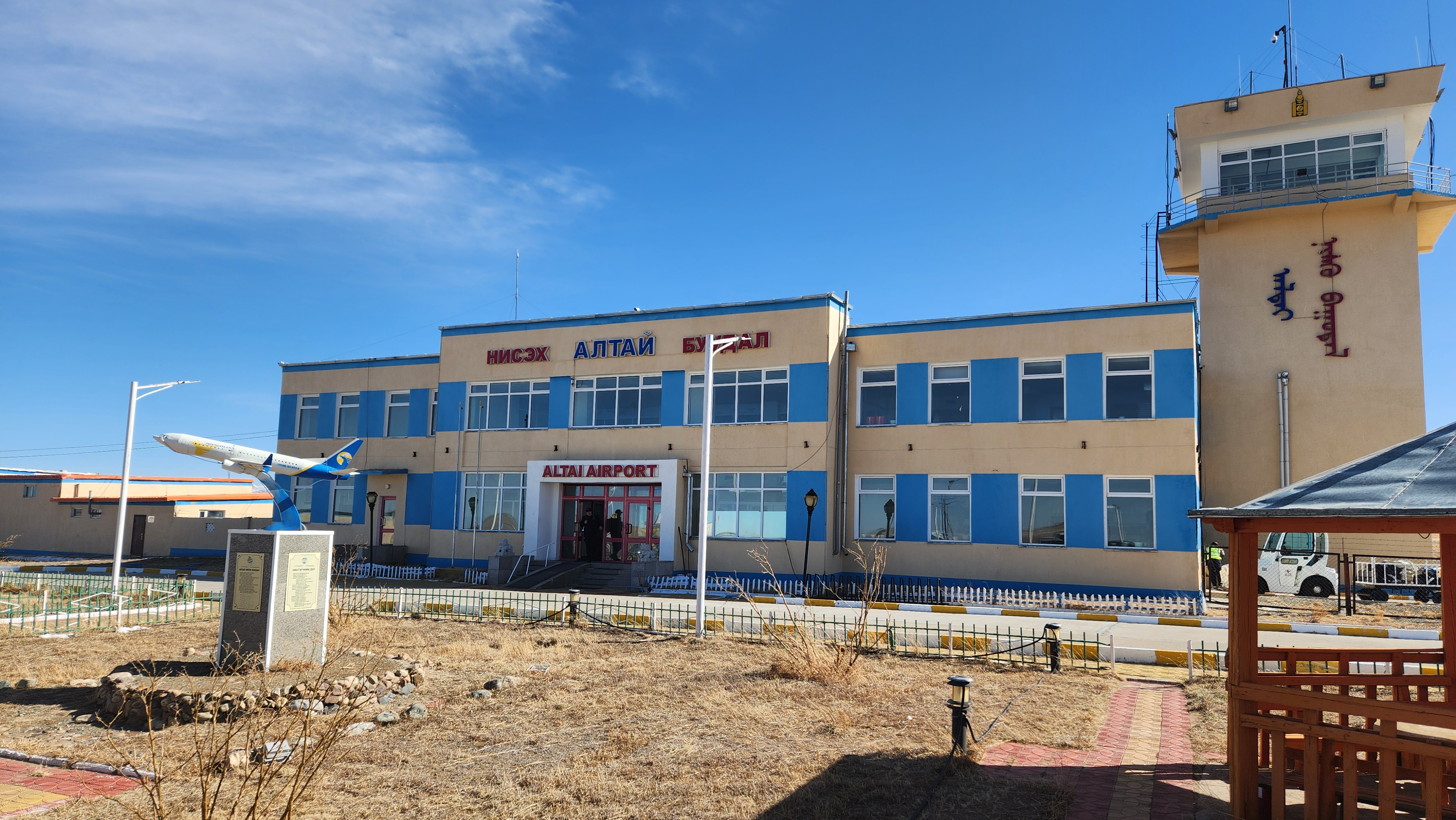
- Airport in 2025
- IATA: LTI; ICAO: ZMAT

Summary
- Airport type: Public / military
- Operator: Mongolian Civil Aviation Authority
- Serves: Altai City, Govi-Altai, Mongolia
- Elevation AMSL: 2,213 m / 7,260 ft
- Coordinates: 46°22′33″N 096°13′09″E

Map
- Location of airport in Mongolia LTI (Asia) LTI (Earth)

Runways
| Direction | Length | | Surface |
| Direction | m | ft | Surface |
|---|---|---|---|
| 10/28 | 2,880 | 9,449 | Asphalt |

Statistics (2013 LTI)
- Passengers: 11,000
- Sources: Civil Aviation Administration of Mongolia and the MCAA

Altai Airport (IATA: LTI, ICAO: ZMAT) is a public airport serving Altai City, which is the capital of the Govi-Altai province (aimag) in western Mongolia. The airport is located 2 km (1.2 mi) west of Altai City. It is capable of handling An-24 type aircraft, including Fokker 50, Dash 8 and ATR 42.

== Airlines and destinations ==
| Airlines | Destinations |
|---|---|
| MIAT Mongolian Airlines | Ulaanbaatar |

== See also ==
- List of airports in Mongolia
- List of airlines of Mongolia
