= Al Rais Cargo =

Al Rais Cargo الريس للشحن
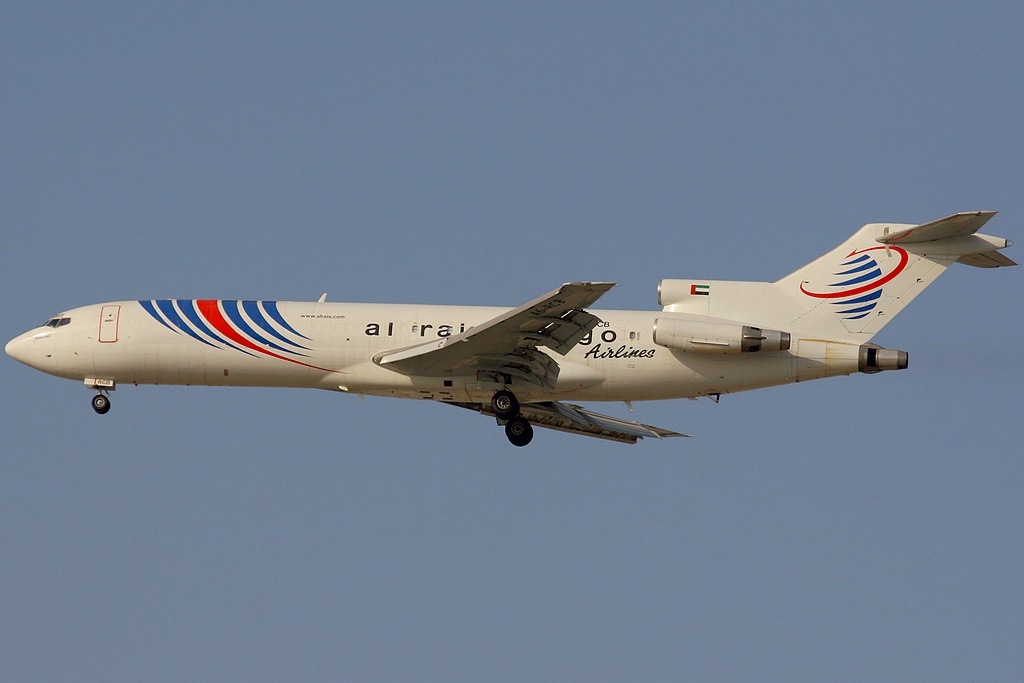
IATA	ICAO	Call sign
-	HJT	AL-RAIS CARGO
- Founded: 1983
- Ceased operations: 2008
- Hubs: Dubai International Airport
- Fleet size: 2
- Headquarters: Dubai, United Arab Emirates
- Key people: Abdul Rahman Mohammed Taher (Managing Director); Jassim Ahmed Al Rais (Director)
- Website: www.alraiscargo.co.ae

Al Rais Cargo was a cargo airline based in Dubai, United Arab Emirates. It was established in 1983 and its main base was Dubai International Airport.

== History ==
Al Rais Cargo launched its airline division in 2004 with an investment of $9 million with a fleet of two Boeing 727-200F's. Its first flight commenced on 1 December 2004 to Tehran, Iran with 20 tonnes of cargo.

The airline ceased operations in 2008.

== Fleet ==
Al Rais Cargo operated the following aircraft (at March 2007):

Al Rais Cargo Fleet
Aircraft	Total	Introduced	Retired	Notes
Boeing 727-200F	2	2004	2008	Both went to Payam Air
