= Tsetserleg Airport =

Airport in Tsetserleg, Arkhangai, Mongolia

- IATA: TSZ; ICAO: ZMTG

Summary
- Serves: Tsetserleg
- Location: Mongolia
- Coordinates: 47°27′56″N 101°28′40″E

Map
- Location in Mongolia

Runways
Direction	Length		Surface
Direction	m	ft	Surface
14/32	1,650	5,413	Grass

Tsetserleg Airport (IATA: TSZ, ICAO: ZMTG) is an airport in Mongolia. The airport is located in Tsetserleg, capital of the province of Arkhangai. It has a grass runway 14/32 1,650 m × 35 m (5,413 ft × 115 ft).

== See also ==
- List of airports in Mongolia
