= Choibalsan Airport =

Airport in Dornod, Mongolia

Choibalsan Airport Чойбалсан нисэх буудал
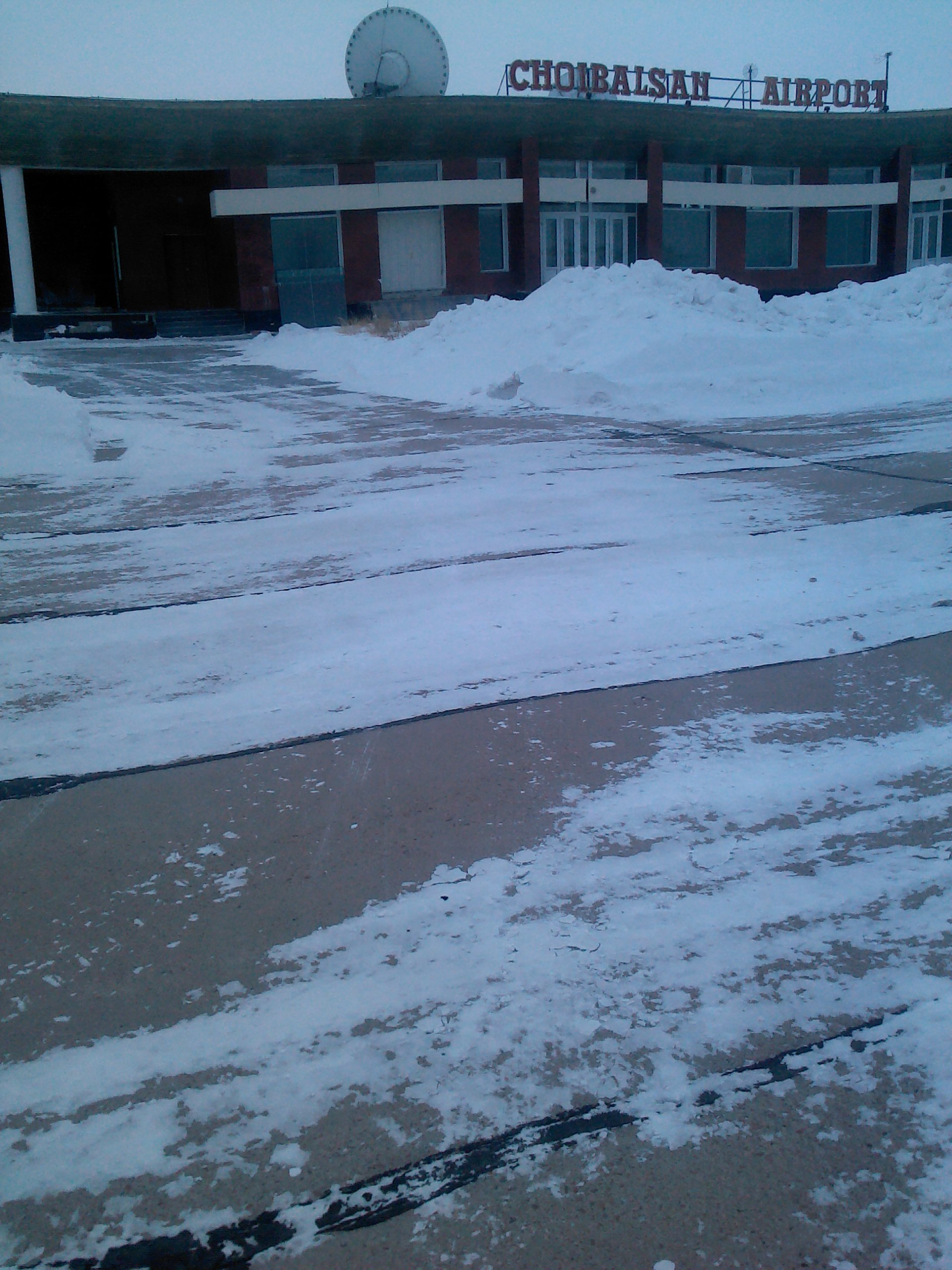
- IATA: COQ; ICAO: ZMCD

Summary
- Airport type: Public / Military
- Operator: Civil Aviation Authority of Mongolia
- Serves: Choibalsan, Mongolia
- Elevation AMSL: 2,454 ft / 748 m
- Coordinates: 48°08′08″N 114°38′46″E
- Website: http://choibalsannisekh.mn

Map
- Location of airport in Mongolia COQ (Asia) COQ (Earth)

Runways
Direction	Length		Surface
Direction	m	ft	Surface
12/30	2,600	8,530	Concrete

Statistics (2013 COQ)
- Passengers: 18,803
- Sources: Civil Aviation Administration of Mongolia

Choibalsan Airport
- Simplified Chinese: 乔巴山机场
Transcriptions

Choibalsan Airport (Mongolian: Чойбалсан нисэх буудал, IATA: COQ, ICAO: ZMCD) is a public airport located in Choibalsan, the capital of Dornod Province in Mongolia. A new passenger building was completed in 2001.

The Soviet 43rd Fighter-Bomber Aviation Regiment was located here from 1968 to 1990. It principally flew Sukhoi Su-7s and Sukhoi Su-17s. In June 1990 it moved to Hvardiiske, Simferopol Raion, in Ukraine.

== See also ==
- List of airports in Mongolia
