= Pyongyang Heliport Facility =

Heliport in North Korea

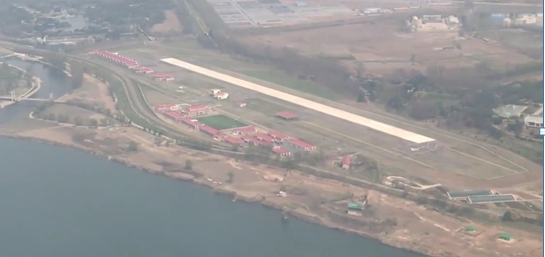
- IATA: none; ICAO: ZKKK

Summary
- Opened: 2015
- Closed: 2022
- Time zone: Pyongyang Time (UTC +09:00)
- Elevation AMSL: 75 ft / 23 m
- Coordinates: 39°2′57.71″N 125°48′22.49″E

Map
- Location within Pyongyang

Runways
Direction	Length		Surface
Direction	ft	m	Surface
17/35	2,600	800

Pyongyang Heliport Facility(평양헬기장) (ICAO:ZKKK) is a large heliport located next to the Taedong River in Pyongyang, North Korea.

== Early years ==
Before the construction of the current heliport a smaller heliport sat roughly 100 metres (330 ft) from the heliport's current site, as recently as early 2014. This site was much smaller the current site and although it is not known exactly when the original heliport was constructed, it had been on the site since at least the year 2000.

== Current heliport ==
=== Construction ===
Construction began on the current heliport, roughly 100 m (330 ft) from the previous one, in late 2014, with the site being usable from mid-2015 and completely finished by late 2015.

=== Design ===
The current heliport has a much larger runway, than the previous one, measuring approximately 800 m (2,600 ft) in length, which is long enough to accommodate many light aircraft, which have been seen to visit the site and also the heliport has the notable feature of a large walled compound, 360 m (1,180 ft) in length, featuring a football pitch and a basketball court, added in October 2015.
