= Bayankhongor Airport =

Airport in Bayankhongor, Mongolia

Bayankhongor Airport Баянхонгор нисэх буудал ᠪᠠᠶᠠᠨ ᠬᠣᠩᠭᠣᠷ ᠨᠢᠰᠬᠦ ᠪᠠᠭᠤᠳᠠᠯ
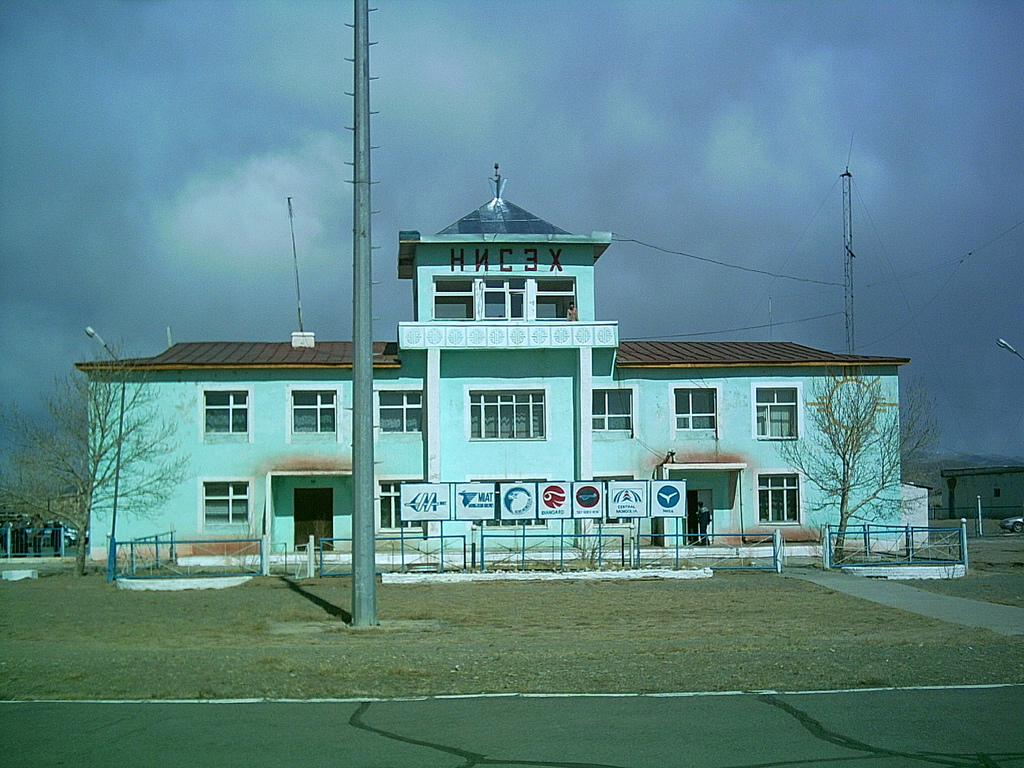
- IATA: BYN; ICAO: ZMBH

Summary
- Airport type: Joint (civil and military)
- Operator: Civil Aviation Authority of Mongolia
- Location: Bayankhongor
- Elevation AMSL: 6,119 ft / 1,865 m
- Coordinates: 46°10′14″N 100°42′00″E

Map
- Location of airport in Mongolia BYN (Asia) BYN (Earth)

Runways
Direction	Length		Surface
Direction	ft	m	Surface
16L/34R	9,186	2,800	Asphalt/concrete

Statistics (2013 BYN)
- Passengers: 10,300
- Sources: Civil Aviation Administration of Mongolia and the MCAA

Bayankhongor Airport (IATA: BYN, ICAO: ZMBH) is a public airport located in Bayankhongor, the capital of Bayankhongor Province in Mongolia.

== See also ==
- List of airports in Mongolia
- List of airlines of Mongolia
