= Baruun-Urt Airport =

Airport in Baruun-Urt, Sükhbaatar, Mongolia

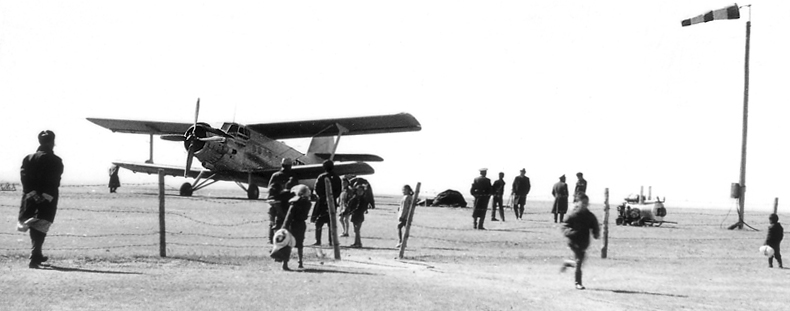
- Baruun-Urt Airport in 1972
- IATA: UUN; ICAO: ZMBU

Summary
- Airport type: Joint (civil and military)
- Operator: Civil Aviation Authority of Mongolia
- Location: Baruun-Urt
- Elevation AMSL: 3,205 ft / 977 m
- Coordinates: 46°39′37″N 113°17′07″E

Map
- Location in Mongolia

Runways
Direction	Length		Surface
Direction	ft	m	Surface
18/36	7,217	2,200	Grass

Statistics (2005 UUN)
- Passengers: 2,600
- Sources: Civil Aviation Administration of Mongolia and the MCAA

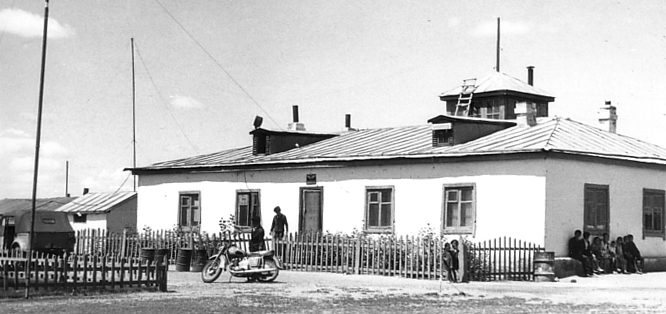
The airport building in 1972

Baruun-Urt Airport (IATA: UUN, ICAO: ZMBU) is a public airport located in Baruun-Urt, the capital of Sükhbaatar Province in Mongolia.

== See also ==
- List of airports in Mongolia
- List of airlines of Mongolia
