= Kharkhorin Airport =

Airport in Kharkhorin, Övörkhangai, Mongolia

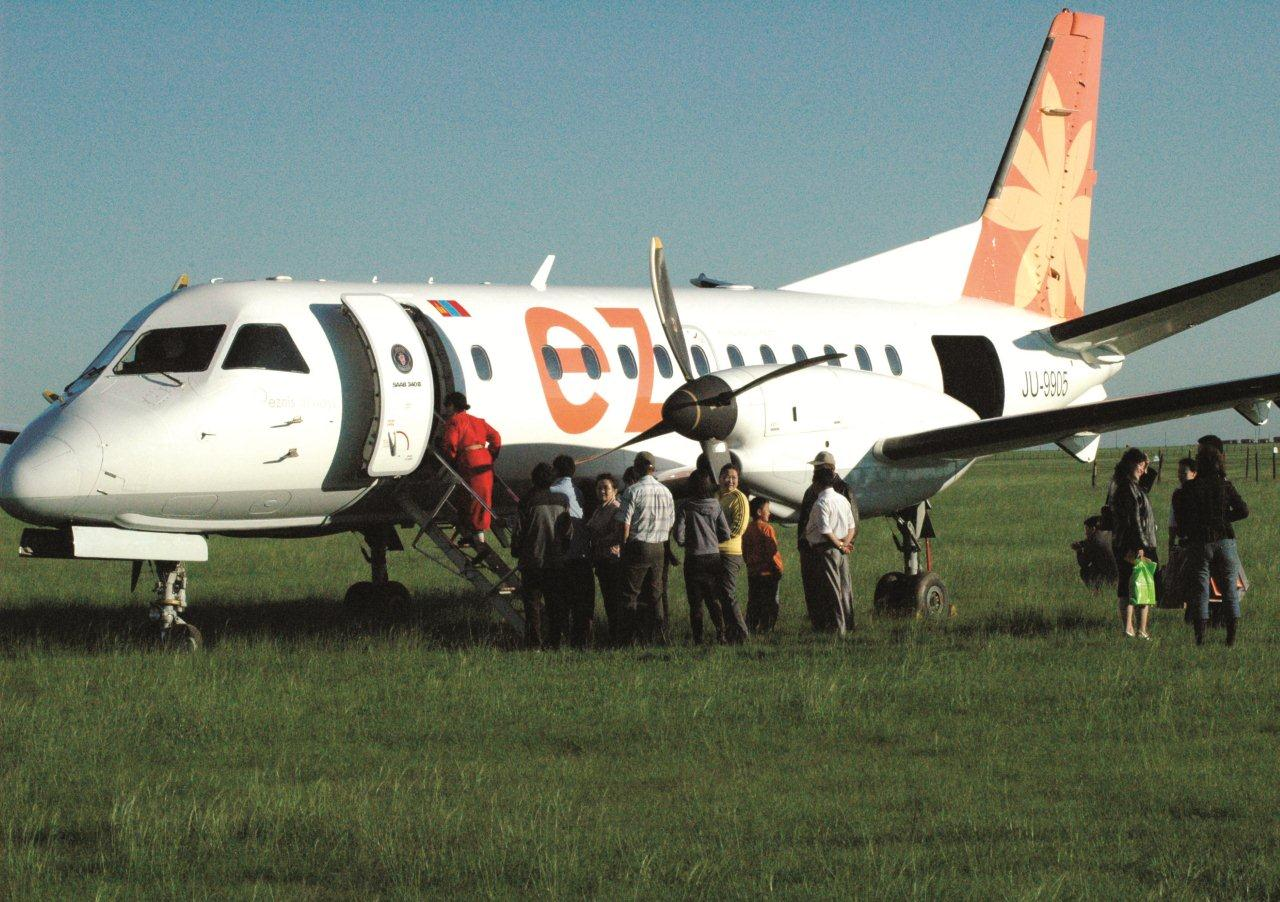
- Saab 340 at the airport
- IATA: KHR; ICAO: ZMHH

Summary
- Airport type: Joint (Civil and Military)
- Operator: Civil Aviation Authority of Mongolia
- Location: Kharkhorin
- Elevation AMSL: 4,759 ft / 1,450 m
- Coordinates: 47°14′48″N 102°49′34″E

Map
- Location in Mongolia

Runways
Direction	Length		Surface
Direction	ft	m	Surface
01/19	5,905	1,800	Grass

Kharkhorin Airport (IATA: KHR, ICAO: ZMHH) is a public airport located in Kharkhorin, a sum (district) center in the Övörkhangai Province of Mongolia.

== Overview ==
The airport is located 4 km north of the town. There is a small passenger terminal building at the northeast side of apron but it is reported that there are virtually no passenger or cargo handling facilities.

== See also ==
- List of airports in Mongolia
