= Ulaangom Airport =

Airport in Uvs, Mongolia

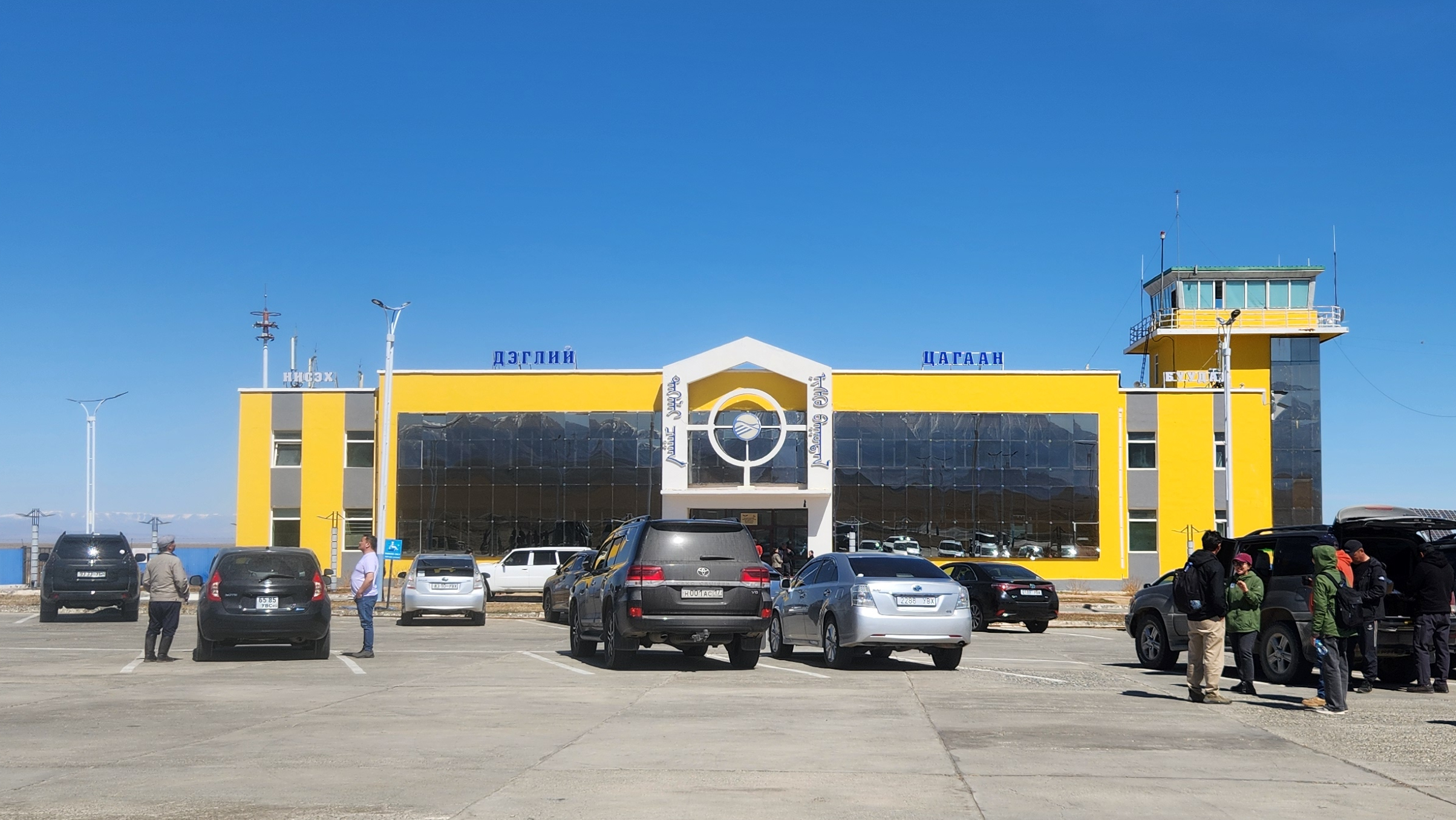
- IATA: ULO; ICAO: ZMUG

Summary
- Airport type: Public
- Operator: Civil Aviation Authority of Mongolia
- Location: Ulaangom
- Coordinates: 50°04′02″N 91°56′16″E

Map
- Location of airport in Mongolia ULO (Asia) ULO (Earth)

Runways
Direction	Length		Surface
Direction	ft	m	Surface
13/31	8,815	2,697 x 30(W)	Concrete

Statistics (2016 ULO)
- Passengers: 13,602
- Sources: Civil Aviation Administration of Mongolia

Ulaangom Airport (IATA: ULO, ICAO: ZMUG) is a public airport located 13 km northwest of Ulaangom, a city in the Uvs Province of Mongolia. It handled 14,669 passengers in 2001. The construction of the new airport with a paved runway started in February 2007. It was completed in 2009.

== Airlines and destinations ==
Airlines	Destinations
MIAT Mongolian Airlines	Ulaanbaatar

== Accidents and incidents ==
26 January 1990: Antonov An-24RV BNMAU-10208 force-landed near Ulaangom Airport after the pilot failed to locate the airport at night; all 41 on board survived.

== See also ==
- List of airports in Mongolia
