= Bulgan Airport (Khovd) =

Airport in Khovd, Mongolia

Bulgan Airport Булган Нисэх Буудал
- IATA: HBU; ICAO: ZMBS

Summary
- Serves: Bulgan, Khovd, Mongolia
- Coordinates: 46°06′06″N 091°34′55″E

Map
- Location in Mongolia

Runways
Direction	Length		Surface
Direction	m	ft	Surface
17/35	1,800	5,906	Grass

Bulgan Airport, Khovd (IATA: HBU, ICAO: ZMBS) serves the city of Bulgan, in the Khovd Province of Mongolia. It has a grass runway 17/35 1,800 m × 30 m (5,906 ft × 98 ft).

== See also ==
- List of airports in Mongolia
