= Arvaikheer Airport =

Airport in Arvaikheer, Övörkhangai, Mongolia

Arvaykheer Airport Арвайхээр нисэх буудал ᠠᠷᠪᠠᠶ ᠬᠡᠭᠡᠷ᠎ᠡ ᠨᠢᠰᠬᠦ ᠪᠠᠭᠤᠳᠠᠯ
- IATA: AVK; ICAO: ZMAH

Summary
- Airport type: Joint (civil and military)
- Operator: Civil Aviation Authority of Mongolia
- Location: Arvaikheer
- Elevation AMSL: 5,932 ft / 1,809 m
- Coordinates: 46°15′09″N 102°47′57″E

Map
- Location in Mongolia

Runways
Direction	Length		Surface
Direction	ft	m	Surface
14/32	8,202.1	2,500	Gravel

Statistics (2010 AVK)
- Passengers: 8,900
- Sources: Civil Aviation Administration of Mongolia and the MCAA

Arvaikheer Airport (IATA: AVK, ICAO: ZMAH) is a public airport located in Arvaikheer, the capital of Övörkhangai Province in Mongolia. The official name in accordance with Mongolian AIP is UVURKHANGAI/Arvaikheer (Aug 2022).

== See also ==
- List of airports in Mongolia
- List of airlines of Mongolia
