= Khujirt =

District in Övörkhangai Province, Mongolia

Khujirt District Хужирт сум ᠬᠤᠵᠢᠷᠲᠤᠰᠤᠮᠤ
- District
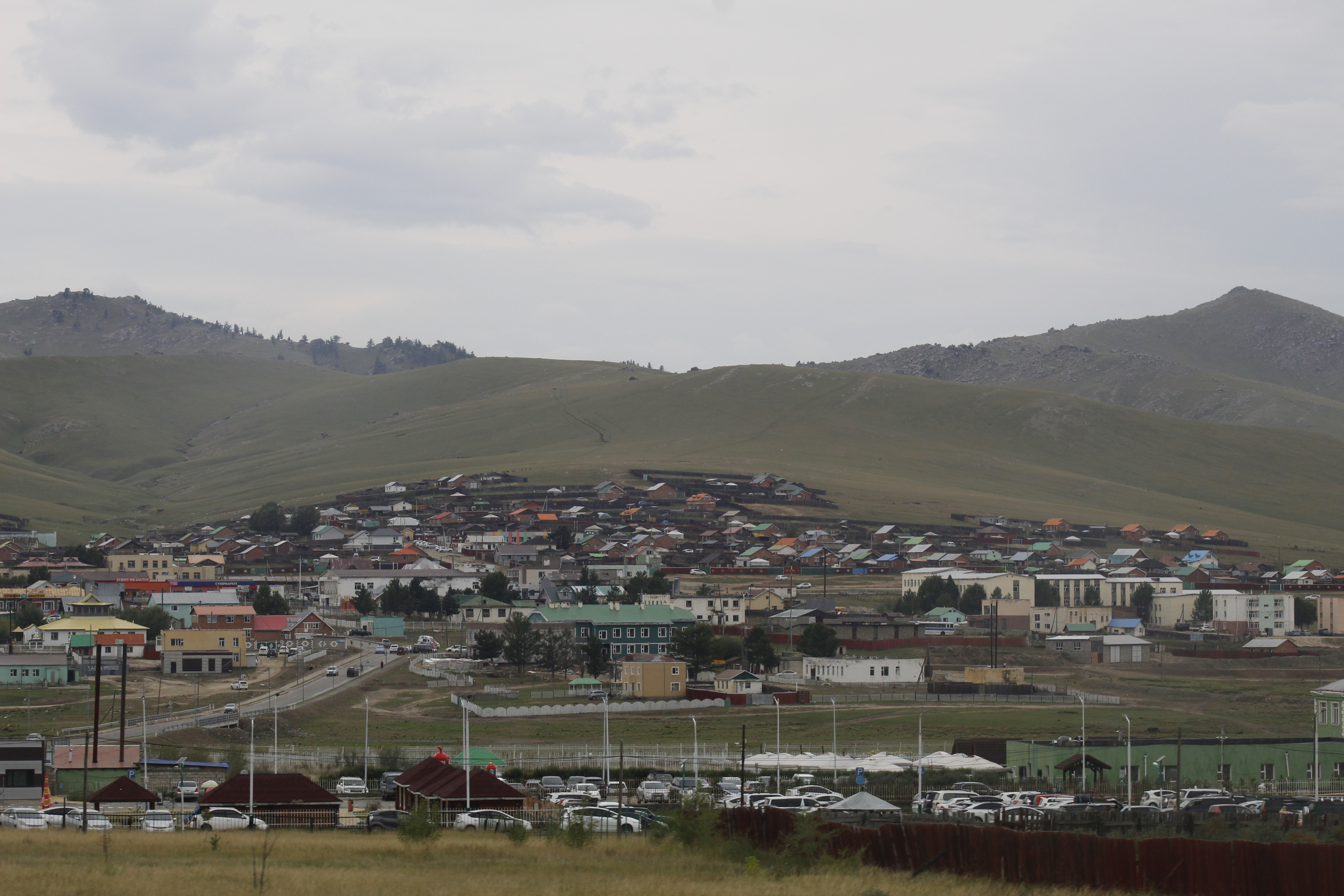
- A view of Khujirt, August 2024.

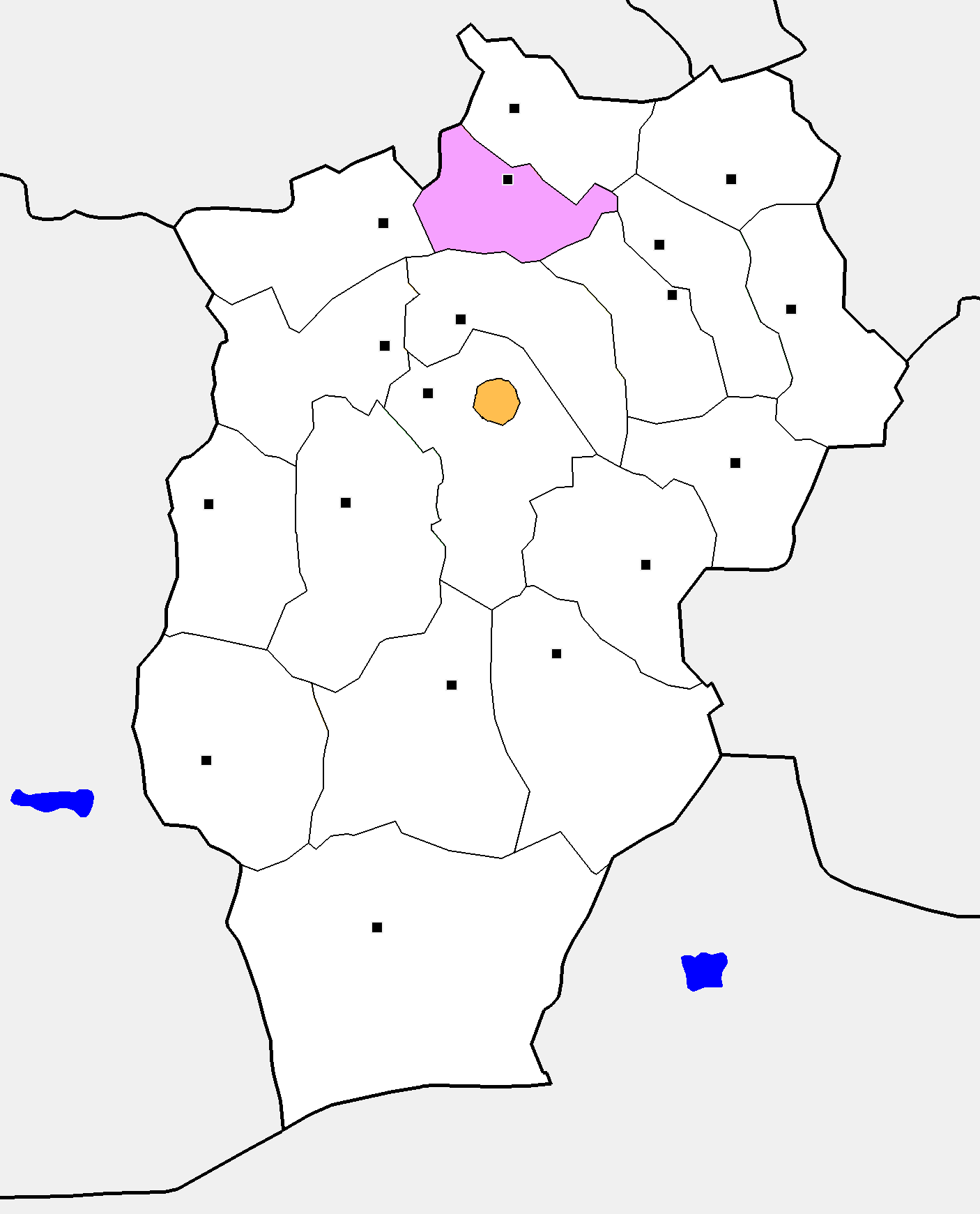
- Khujirt District in Övörkhangai Province

- Location within Mongolia
- Coordinates: 46°53′51″N 102°46′0″E
- Country: Mongolia
- Province: Övörkhangai Province
- Established: 1931

Government
  - Governor: Dorji Batbayar

Area
  - Total: 1,718 km^{2} (663 sq mi)

Population (2023)
  - Total: 6,568
  - Density: 3.823/km^{2} (9.902/sq mi)
- Time zone: UTC+8 (UTC + 8)

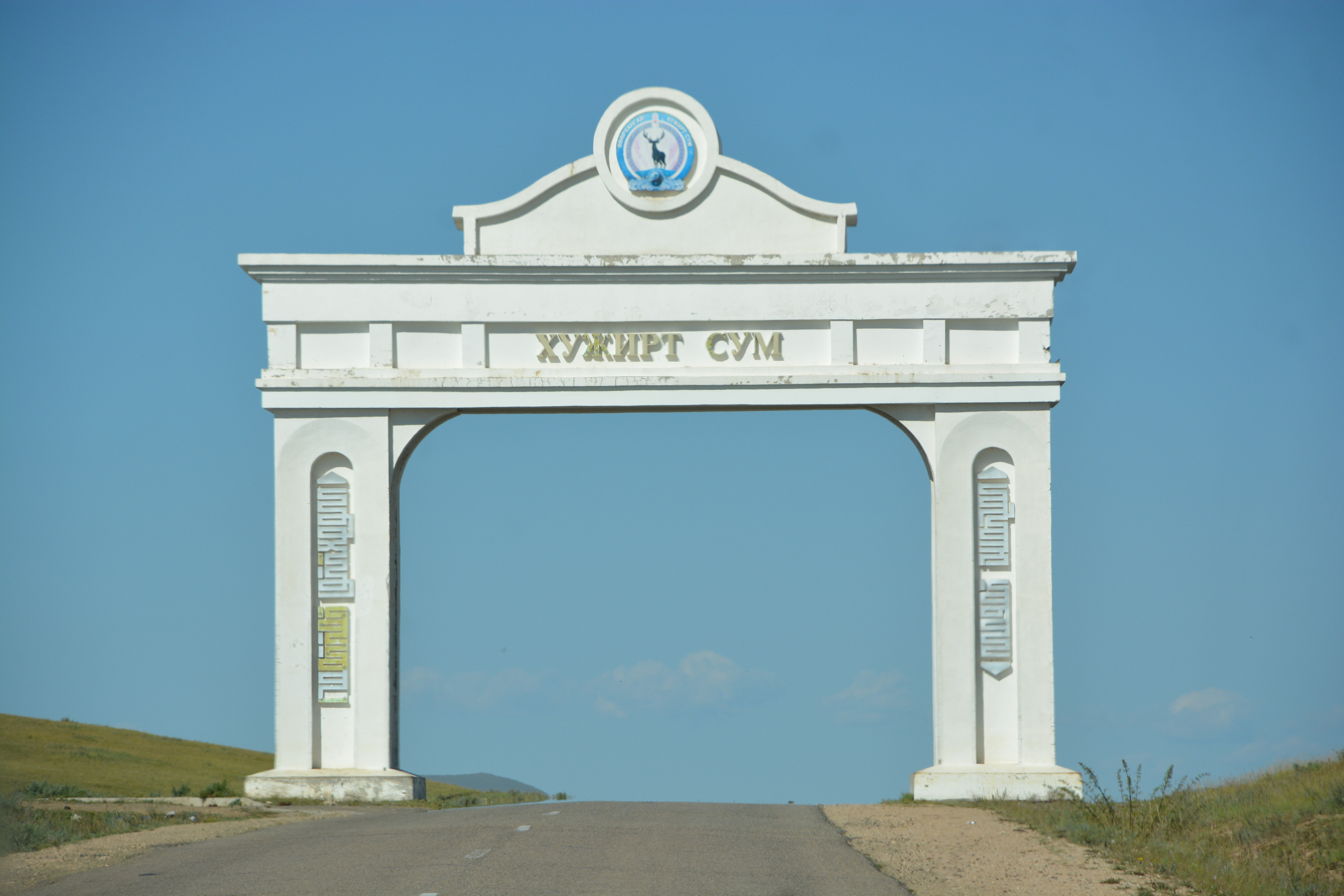
A gate marking the boundary of Khujirt.

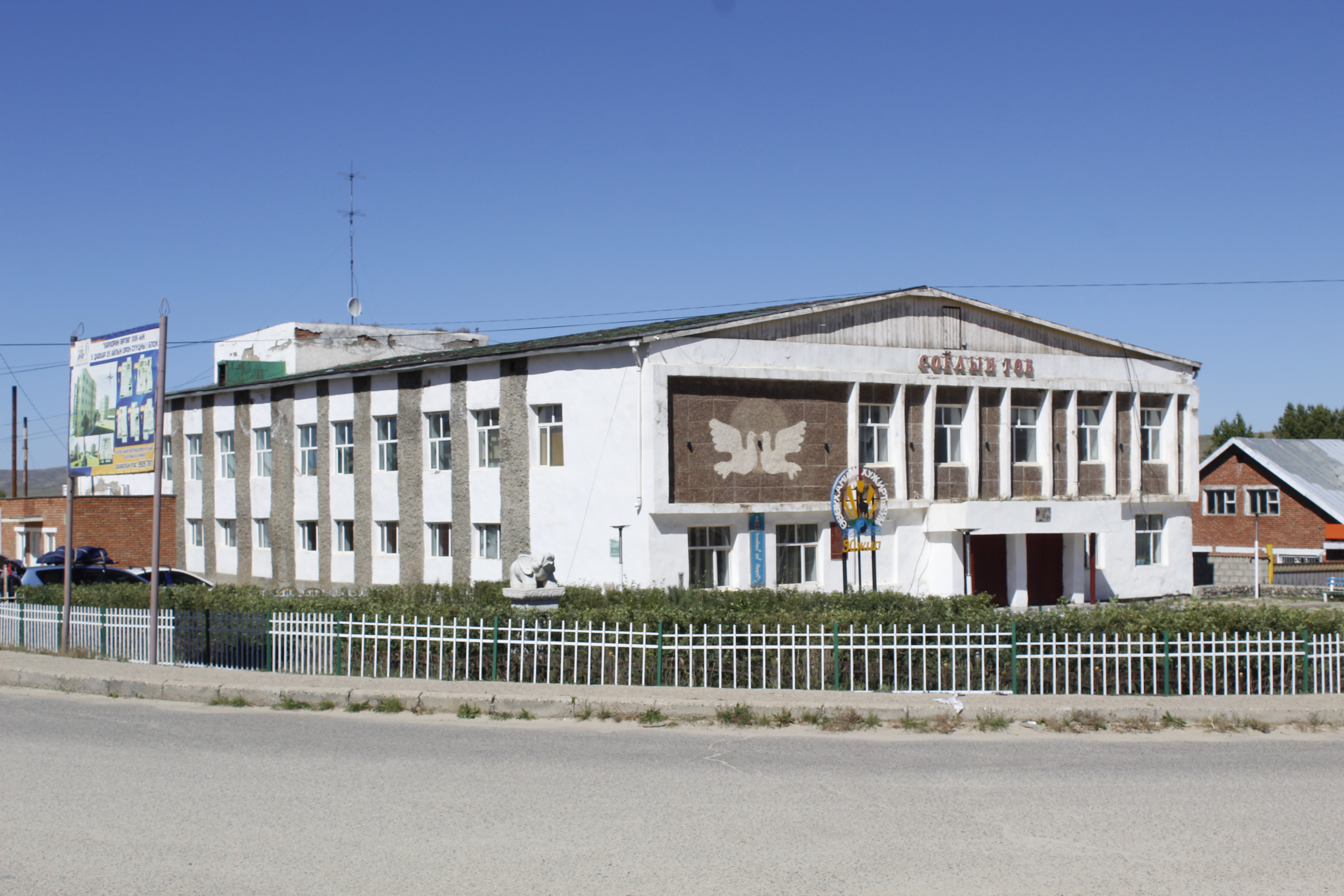
Khujirt Cultural Center

Khujirt (Mongolian: Хужирт) is a sum (district) of Övörkhangai Province in central Mongolia.

Established in 1931 under the name of Khaluun-Us under the jurisdiction of Arkhangai Province, it was transferred to its current province and renamed to Khujirt in 1934. Situated at around 380 km from Ulaanbaatar, the district varies in altitude from 1700m to 2360m. While there have been significant developments in both small industries and the tourism sector, 37.9% of households still rely on herding. The town also features a school, a hospital, and several kindergartens.

== Climate ==
Khujirt has a subarctic climate (Köppen climate classification Dwc) with mild summers and severely cold winters. Most precipitation falls in the summer as rain, with some snow in the adjacent months of May and September. Winters are very dry.

Climate data for Khujirt, elevation 1,662 m (5,453 ft), (1991–2020 normals, extremes 1961–1990)
Month	Jan	Feb	Mar	Apr	May	Jun	Jul	Aug	Sep	Oct	Nov	Dec	Year
Record high °C (°F)	6.0 (42.8)	11.0 (51.8)	18.0 (64.4)	25.9 (78.6)	28.0 (82.4)	32.0 (89.6)	31.7 (89.1)	32.3 (90.1)	26.7 (80.1)	23.6 (74.5)	15.1 (59.2)	11.7 (53.1)	32.3 (90.1)
Mean daily maximum °C (°F)	−13.2 (8.2)	−7.5 (18.5)	1.6 (34.9)	11.0 (51.8)	16.7 (62.1)	22.1 (71.8)	23.9 (75.0)	22.1 (71.8)	16.8 (62.2)	8.5 (47.3)	−1.8 (28.8)	−10.6 (12.9)	7.5 (45.4)
Daily mean °C (°F)	−21.4 (−6.5)	−16.7 (1.9)	−7.0 (19.4)	3.1 (37.6)	9.2 (48.6)	14.9 (58.8)	17.0 (62.6)	14.8 (58.6)	8.8 (47.8)	0.0 (32.0)	−10.3 (13.5)	−18.3 (−0.9)	−0.5 (31.1)
Mean daily minimum °C (°F)	−27.9 (−18.2)	−24.1 (−11.4)	−14.5 (5.9)	−4.4 (24.1)	1.5 (34.7)	7.3 (45.1)	10.2 (50.4)	7.8 (46.0)	0.7 (33.3)	−7.3 (18.9)	−16.7 (1.9)	−24.5 (−12.1)	−7.7 (18.2)
Record low °C (°F)	−41.3 (−42.3)	−40.2 (−40.4)	−35.8 (−32.4)	−24.3 (−11.7)	−12.8 (9.0)	−5.1 (22.8)	−1.6 (29.1)	−4.5 (23.9)	−16.7 (1.9)	−26.0 (−14.8)	−36 (−33)	−41.8 (−43.2)	−41.8 (−43.2)
Average precipitation mm (inches)	2.3 (0.09)	2.3 (0.09)	5.5 (0.22)	9.7 (0.38)	20.3 (0.80)	47.3 (1.86)	83.1 (3.27)	60.3 (2.37)	19.0 (0.75)	7.5 (0.30)	4.1 (0.16)	2.3 (0.09)	263.7 (10.38)
Average precipitation days (≥ 1.0 mm)	1.0	0.7	1.7	2.6	3.8	8.4	11.2	9.0	3.9	2.3	1.4	0.7	46.7
Mean monthly sunshine hours	196.4	210.7	261.5	252.9	283.0	272.8	260.2	250.0	250.3	238.5	196.0	176.3	2,848.6
Source 1: NOAA (extremes and sun 1961–1990)
Source 2: Starlings Roost Weather

== Administrative divisions ==
The district is divided into six bags, which are:

- Berkh
- Dulaan
- Shiveet
- Shunkhlai
- Uujim
- Uvur modot

== Infrastructure ==
=== Water supply ===
Water consumption for the district are mainly for resorts, offices and ger districts. Water is sourced from 18 water wells and transported to residents in the ger districts.
