= Khovd Airport =

Airport in Khovd, Mongolia

Khovd Airport Ховд нисэх буудал
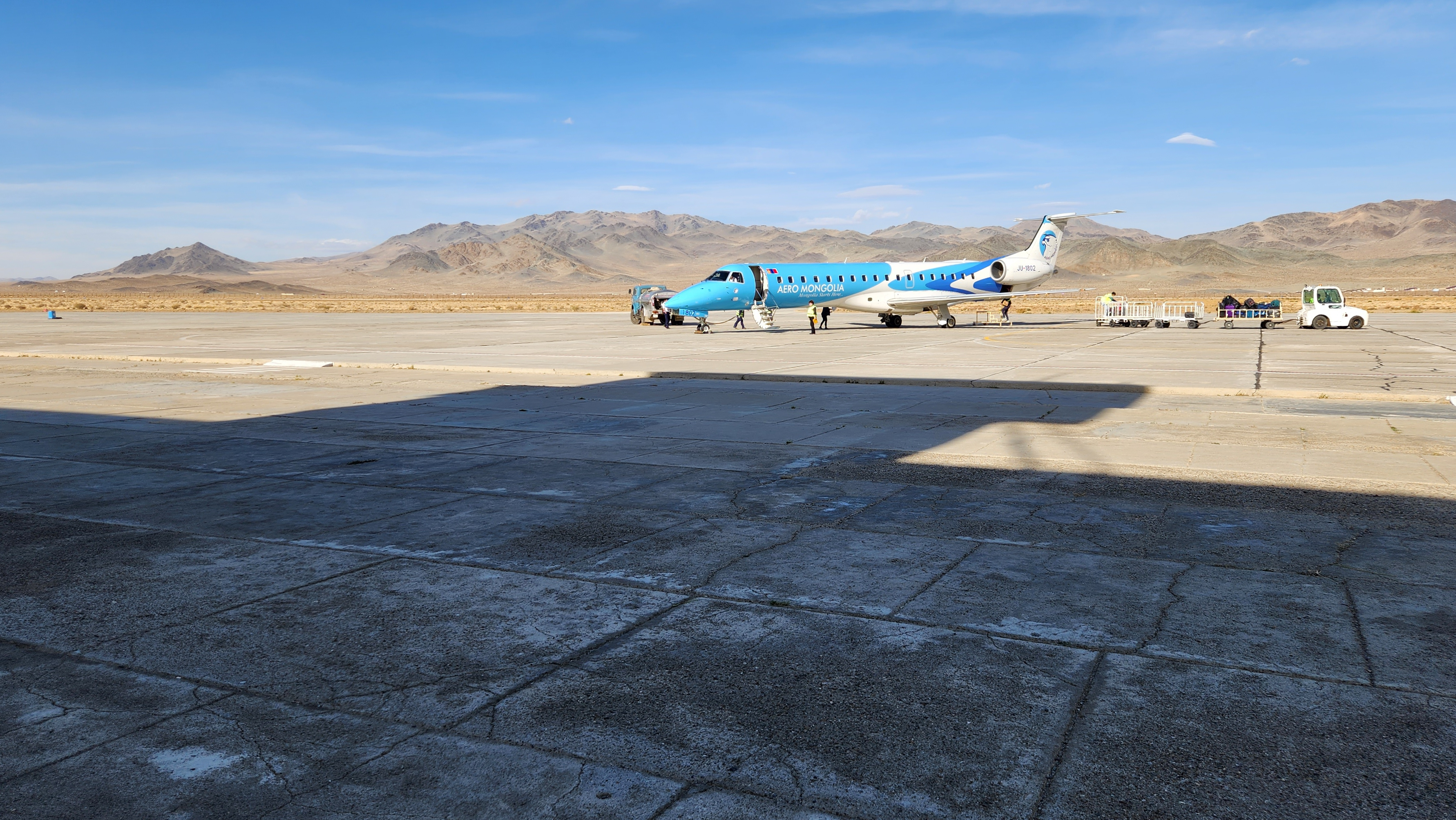
- IATA: HVD; ICAO: ZMKD

Summary
- Airport type: Joint (civil and military)
- Operator: Civil Aviation Authority of Mongolia
- Location: Khovd
- Elevation AMSL: 4,898 ft (1,493 m)
- Coordinates: 47°57′41″N 91°37′33″E

Map
- Location of airport in Mongolia HVD (Asia) HVD (Earth)

Runways
Direction	Length		Surface
Direction	ft	m	Surface
16L/34	9,350	2,850	Asphalt/concrete
16R/34R	6,561	2,000	Grass

Statistics (2012 HVD)
- Passengers: 31926
- Sources: Civil Aviation Administration of Mongolia

Khovd Airport (Mongolian: Ховд нисэх буудал; (IATA: HVD, ICAO: ZMKD)) is a public airport located in Khovd city, Khovd Province, Mongolia.

== Airlines and destinations ==
Airlines	Destinations
MIAT Mongolian Airlines	Ulaanbaatar

== See also ==
- List of airports in Mongolia
