= Bulgan, Khovd =

District in Khovd Province, Mongolia

Coordinates: 45°54′51″N 91°12′34″E

Bulgan District Булган сум ᠪᠤᠯᠠᠭᠠᠨᠰᠤᠮᠤ
- District
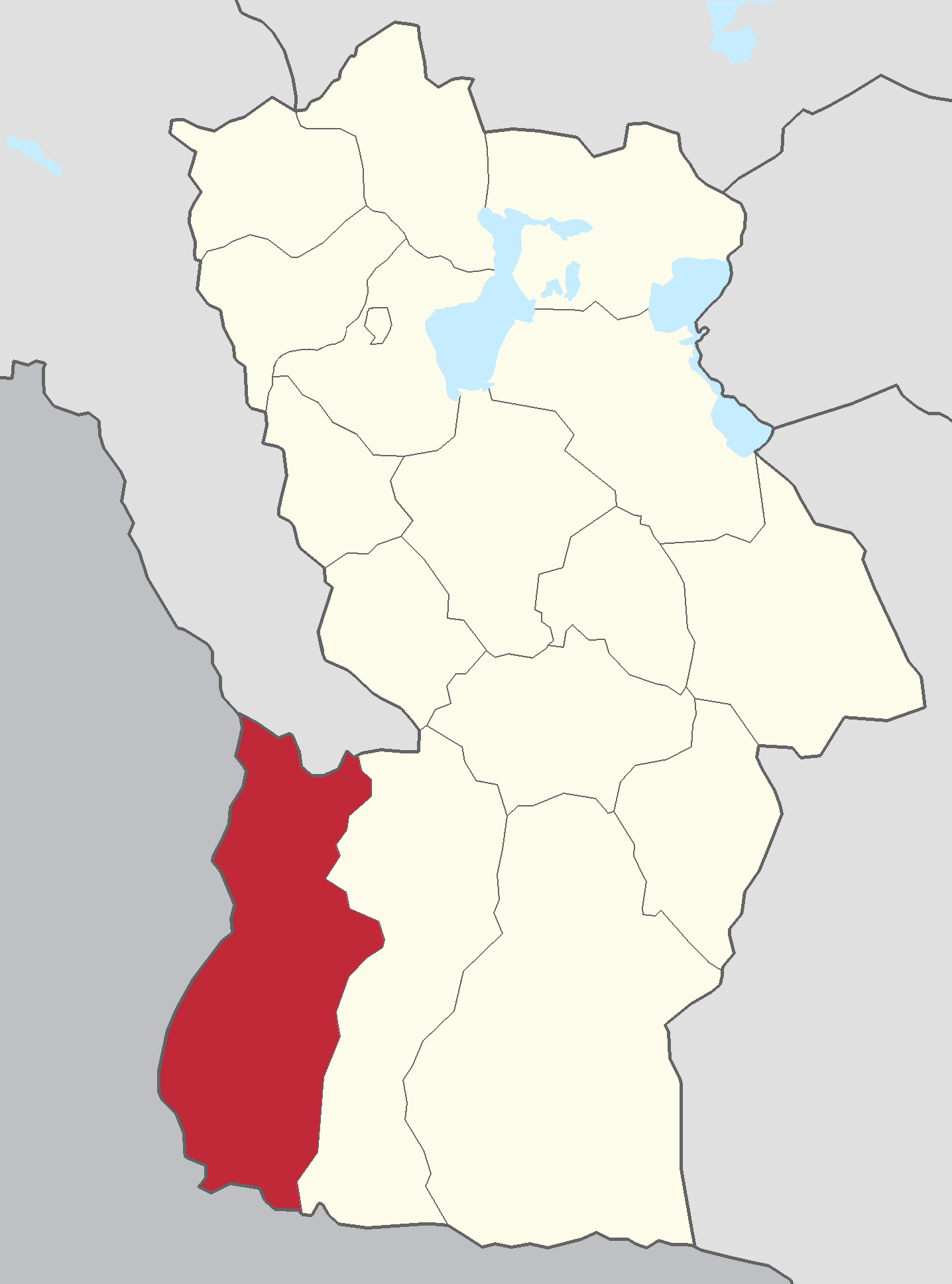
- Bulgan District in Khovd Province
- Country: Mongolia
- Province: Khovd Province

Area
  - Total: 8,104 km^{2} (3,129 sq mi)
- Time zone: UTC+7 (UTC + 7)
- Website: http://bulgan.kho.gov.mn/

Bulgan (Mongolian: Булган) is a sum (district) of Khovd Province in western Mongolia. It is 335 km away from the city of Khovd.

== Climate ==
Climate data for Bulgan, Khovd (Burenkhairkhan), elevation 1,184 m (3,885 ft), (1991–2020, extremes 1963–present)
Month	Jan	Feb	Mar	Apr	May	Jun	Jul	Aug	Sep	Oct	Nov	Dec	Year
Record high °C (°F)	3.1 (37.6)	8.8 (47.8)	22.2 (72.0)	30.9 (87.6)	32.8 (91.0)	37.8 (100.0)	39.0 (102.2)	38.0 (100.4)	32.4 (90.3)	26.4 (79.5)	16.8 (62.2)	7.8 (46.0)	39.0 (102.2)
Mean daily maximum °C (°F)	−12.3 (9.9)	−6.2 (20.8)	4.3 (39.7)	15.2 (59.4)	21.6 (70.9)	27.0 (80.6)	28.8 (83.8)	27.2 (81.0)	21.1 (70.0)	12.1 (53.8)	0.2 (32.4)	−9.8 (14.4)	10.8 (51.4)
Daily mean °C (°F)	−21.0 (−5.8)	−15.1 (4.8)	−3.4 (25.9)	7.8 (46.0)	14.4 (57.9)	20.1 (68.2)	21.9 (71.4)	19.6 (67.3)	13.1 (55.6)	4.3 (39.7)	−7.2 (19.0)	−17.6 (0.3)	3.1 (37.5)
Mean daily minimum °C (°F)	−27.3 (−17.1)	−22.7 (−8.9)	−10.7 (12.7)	0.1 (32.2)	6.6 (43.9)	12.5 (54.5)	14.4 (57.9)	11.5 (52.7)	4.8 (40.6)	−3.1 (26.4)	−13.3 (8.1)	−23.3 (−9.9)	−4.2 (24.4)
Record low °C (°F)	−47.5 (−53.5)	−40.6 (−41.1)	−37.7 (−35.9)	−22.8 (−9.0)	−7.2 (19.0)	0.0 (32.0)	4.2 (39.6)	0.3 (32.5)	−8.4 (16.9)	−19.4 (−2.9)	−40.3 (−40.5)	−43.4 (−46.1)	−47.5 (−53.5)
Average precipitation mm (inches)	4 (0.2)	3 (0.1)	4 (0.2)	5 (0.2)	7 (0.3)	7 (0.3)	13 (0.5)	13 (0.5)	4 (0.2)	4 (0.2)	8 (0.3)	5 (0.2)	77 (3.2)
Average precipitation days (≥ 1.0 mm)	1.7	1.8	1.9	1.5	2.2	2.6	2.7	2.4	2.1	2.0	2.4	2.1	25.3
Average relative humidity (%)	77.9	75.1	63.1	47.3	44.2	46.4	48.9	49.5	50.5	56.5	69.3	76.4	58.8
Source 1: Pogoda.ru.net
Source 2: NOAA

== Administrative divisions ==
The district is divided into six bags, which are:

- Alagtolgoi
- Baitag
- Bayangol
- Bayansudal
- Burenkhairkhan
- Dalt
