= List of airlines of Mongolia =

This is a list of airlines which have a current air operator's certificate issued by the Civil Aviation Authority of Mongolia (Mongolian: Иргэний Нисэхийн Ерөнхий Газар).

== Scheduled airlines ==
Airline	Image	IATA	ICAO	Callsign	Commenced operations
Aero Mongolia		M0	MNG	AERO MONGOLIA	2003
Hunnu Air		MR	MML	TRANS MONGOLIA	2012
MIAT Mongolian Airlines		OM	MGL	MONGOL AIR	1956

== Suspended airlines ==
Airline	Image	IATA	ICAO	Callsign	Commenced operations
Eznis Airways		MG	EZA	EZNIS	2019

== Charter airlines ==
Airline	Image	IATA	ICAO	Callsign	Commenced operations
Sky Horse Aviation			TNL	SKY HORSE	
Mongolian Airways		XF	MGW	GREAT MONGOLIAN	2011

== Cargo airlines ==
Airline	Image	IATA	ICAO	Callsign	Commenced operations

== See also ==
- List of defunct airlines of Mongolia
- List of airlines of Asia
- List of defunct airlines of Asia
- List of airports in Mongolia
- Buyant-Ukhaa International Airport
