= Mongolian Airlines (disambiguation) =

Mongolian Airlines can refer to multiple airlines based in Mongolia:

- MIAT Mongolian Airlines, the largest airline and flag carrier
- Mongolian Airlines, a smaller airline, now called Hunnu Air
