= MIAT Flight 557 =

1995 aviation accident in Mongolia

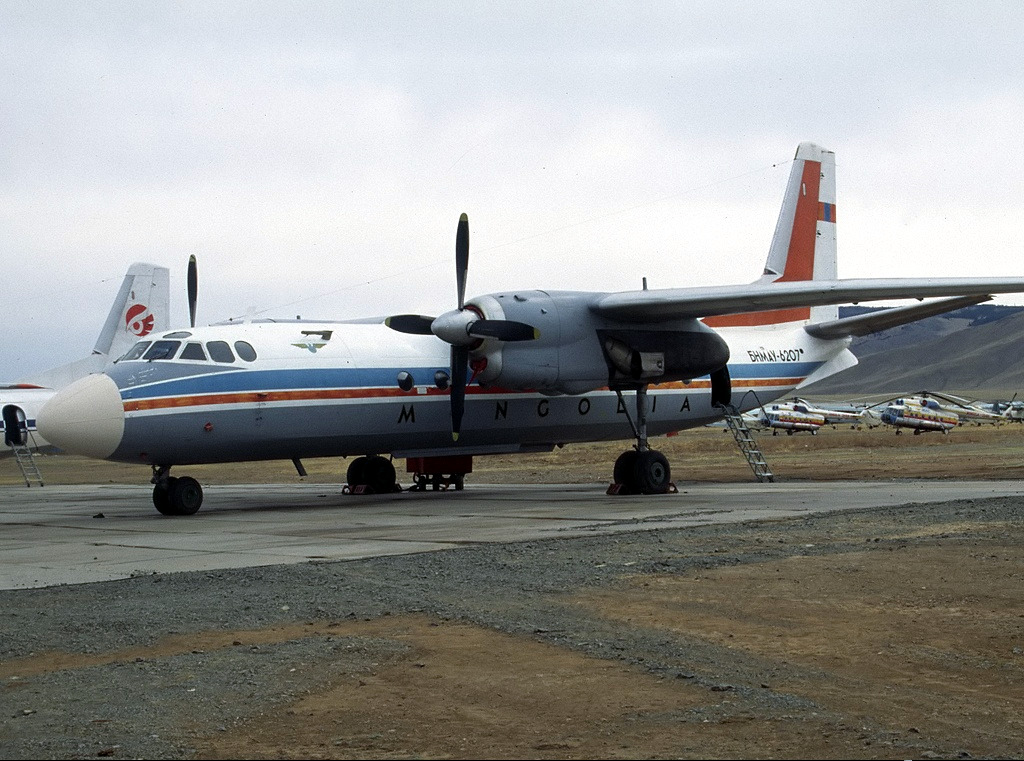
- A MIAT Mongolian Airlines Antonov An-24 similar to the aircraft involved

Accident
- Date: 21 September 1995
- Summary: Controlled flight into terrain due to pilot error
- Site: Choho Geologloh Uul, Mongolia

Aircraft
- Aircraft type: Antonov An-24RV
- Operator: MIAT Mongolian Airlines
- Registration: BNMAU-10103
- Flight origin: Buyant-Ukhaa International Airport, Ulaanbaatar, Mongolia
- Destination: Mörön Airport, Mörön, Mongolia
- Occupants: 43
- Passengers: 37
- Crew: 6
- Fatalities: 42
- Injuries: 1
- Survivors: 1

On 21 September 1995, MIAT Mongolian Airlines Flight 557, a scheduled domestic passenger flight from Ulaanbaatar to Mörön in Mongolia crashed into a mountain whilst on approach to Mörön, killing 42 out of the 43 people on board. The crash remains the deadliest aviation accident in Mongolia.

== Aircraft and crew ==
The aircraft involved was an Antonov An-24RV registered as BNMAU-10103. It was manufactured in 1975 and purchased by MIAT Mongolian Airlines the same year. It was powered by two Ivchenko AI-24VT. On board the flight were 43 occupants consisting of 37 passengers and 6 crew members.

== Accident ==
On 21 September 1995, the aircraft was operating a scheduled domestic passenger flight from Buyant-Ukhaa International Airport in Ulaanbaatar to Mörön Airport in Mörön. On approach to Mörön Airport, the pilots initiated a descent, considering the visibility to be adequate. At around 12:30 local time, the aircraft crashed into the slope of the Baishint Mountain 12 kilometres (7.5 mi) away from the airport, killing all six crew members and 36 of the 37 passengers. The only survivor of the crash was a 27-year-old man named Sanjaagiin Ulziibayar. The crash remains the deadliest aviation accident in Mongolia.

== Aftermath ==
Ulziibayar was seriously injured in the crash and was hospitalized, having suffered a spinal cord injury and a stroke. According to Ulziibayar's sister, the airline had given orders to his family to not interact with the press nor provide them with information. Reportedly, Japanese journalists had told her: "Please send your younger brother to our country with us, we will be happy to cure and treat this rare lucky person." Although the airline gave Ulziibayar a one-room apartment, according to her, Erdeniin Bat-Üül had been the one who was behind the offer.

The Mongolian government established a commission of inquiry to investigate the crash. The investigation subsequently blamed the crash on pilot error. The crew had gone against standard operating procedures by prematurely initiating the descent, believing that a visual approach was possible. Also cited as contributing factors were a lack of cockpit discipline and the low visibility present in the area. The crash led to concerns regarding the state of Mongolia's "ageing aviation equipment". Following the accident, the Civil Aviation Authority of Mongolia decided to equip MIAT's fleet with ground position indicators.
