= 1998 MIAT Harbin Y-12 crash =

1998 passenger plane crash near Erdenet, Orkhon, Mongolia

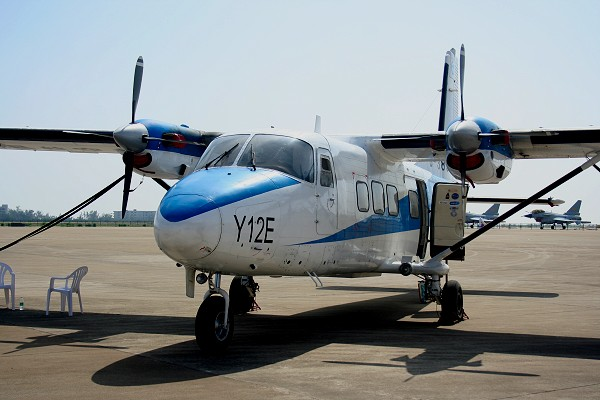
- A Harbin Y-12 similar to the one involved.

Accident
- Date: 26 May 1998
- Summary: Controlled flight into terrain due to pilot error
- Site: Near Erdenet, Orkhon, Mongolia

Aircraft
- Aircraft type: Harbin Y-12 II
- Operator: MIAT Mongolian Airlines
- Registration: JU-1017
- Flight origin: Erdenet Airport, Erdenet, Mongolia
- Destination: Mörön Airport, Mörön, Mongolia
- Passengers: 26
- Crew: 2
- Fatalities: 28
- Survivors: 0

The 1998 MIAT Mongolian Airlines crash was a domestic flight operated by MIAT Mongolian Airlines that crashed on 26 May 1998, killing all on board. The flight departed Erdenet Airport at approximately 09:17 on a flight to Mörön, with 26 passengers and 2 crew. Approximately 13 minutes after departure, while the plane was climbing to cruising altitude, it struck the top of a 6,500 ft mountain, killing all passengers and crew. Of the 26 passengers, 14 were adults and 12 were children.

== The aircraft ==
The Harbin Y-12, registration JU-1017 (cn 0064), first flew in 1992. The aircraft was designed to hold only 19 passengers, but a government representative said the plane was not overloaded.
