= Ulg (disambiguation) =

Ulg may refer to:

- Ulg, album by Estonian folk metal group Metsatöll.

ULG is an abbreviation that can also mean:

- University of Liège
- IATA code of Ölgii Airport, Mongolia
