= Tuul Highway =

Highway in Ulaanbaatar, Mongolia

- Native name: Aвтомагистрали Туул (Mongolian)
- Type: highway
- Length: 32 km (20 mi)
- Location: Ulaanbaatar, Mongolia
- From: Bayanzurkh Bridge
- To: Safety Circle of Songino Khairkhan

Construction
- Construction start: April 2025 (planned)
- Completion: 2027 (planned)

The Tuul Highway (Mongolian: Aвтомагистрали Туул) is a planned highway in Ulaanbaatar, Mongolia.

== History ==
The project bidding to construct the highway will be announced on 25 January 2025. The construction work will start in April 2025 and is expected to be completed by 2027.

== Technical specifications ==
The highway will have a total length of 32 km. The highway will cover the distance from Bayanzurkh Bridge in Bayanzürkh on the eastern end to Safety Circle in Songino Khairkhan on the western end.

== See also ==
- Transport in Mongolia
