= Transport in Mongolia =

Transportation networks and infrastructure in Mongolia

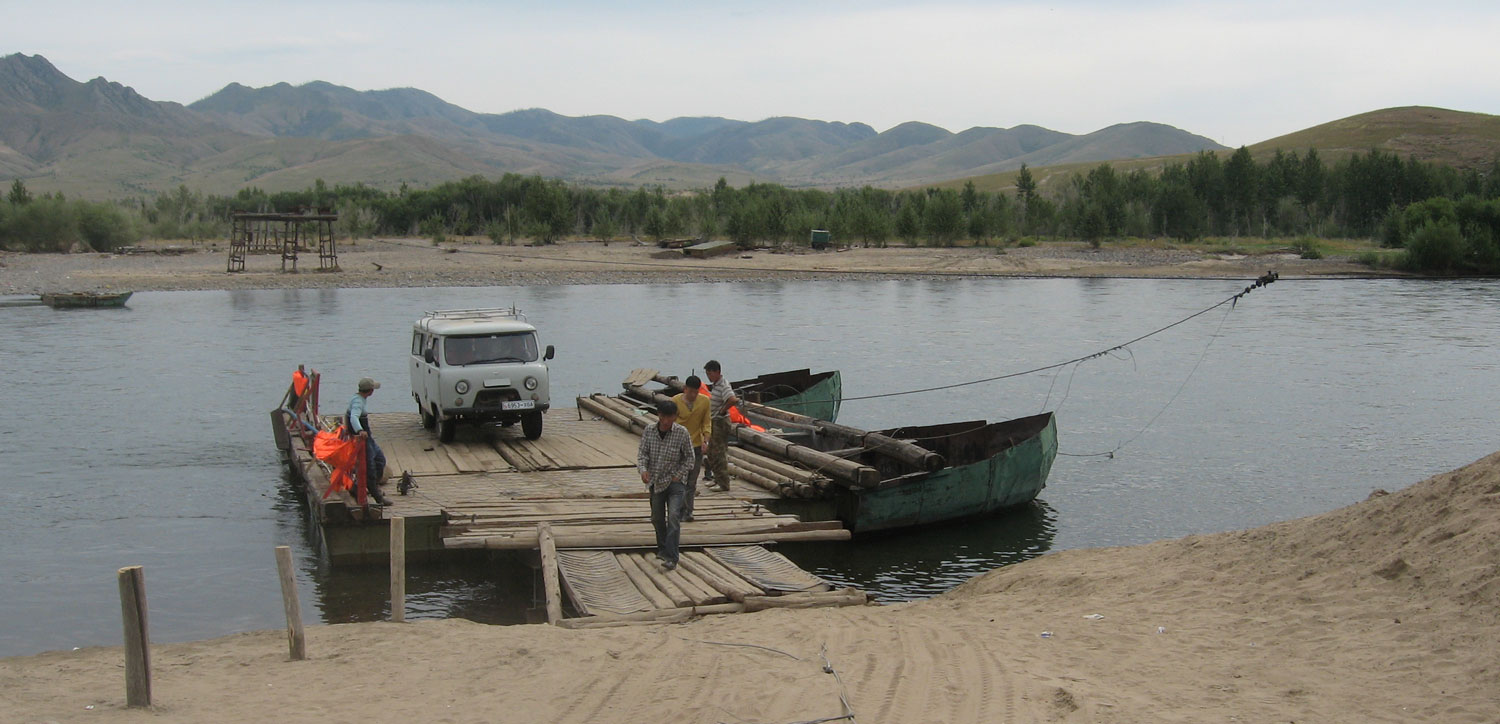
Cable ferry across the Selenge river, in Khövsgöl aimag

Transportation in Mongolia comprises rail, road, air, and limited water transport systems that support movement across the country's vast and sparsely populated territory. Railways form the backbone of freight transport, while roads and buses provide domestic and urban connectivity. Air transport plays a key role in linking remote regions, and inland waterways are used only to a limited extent.

== Railways ==
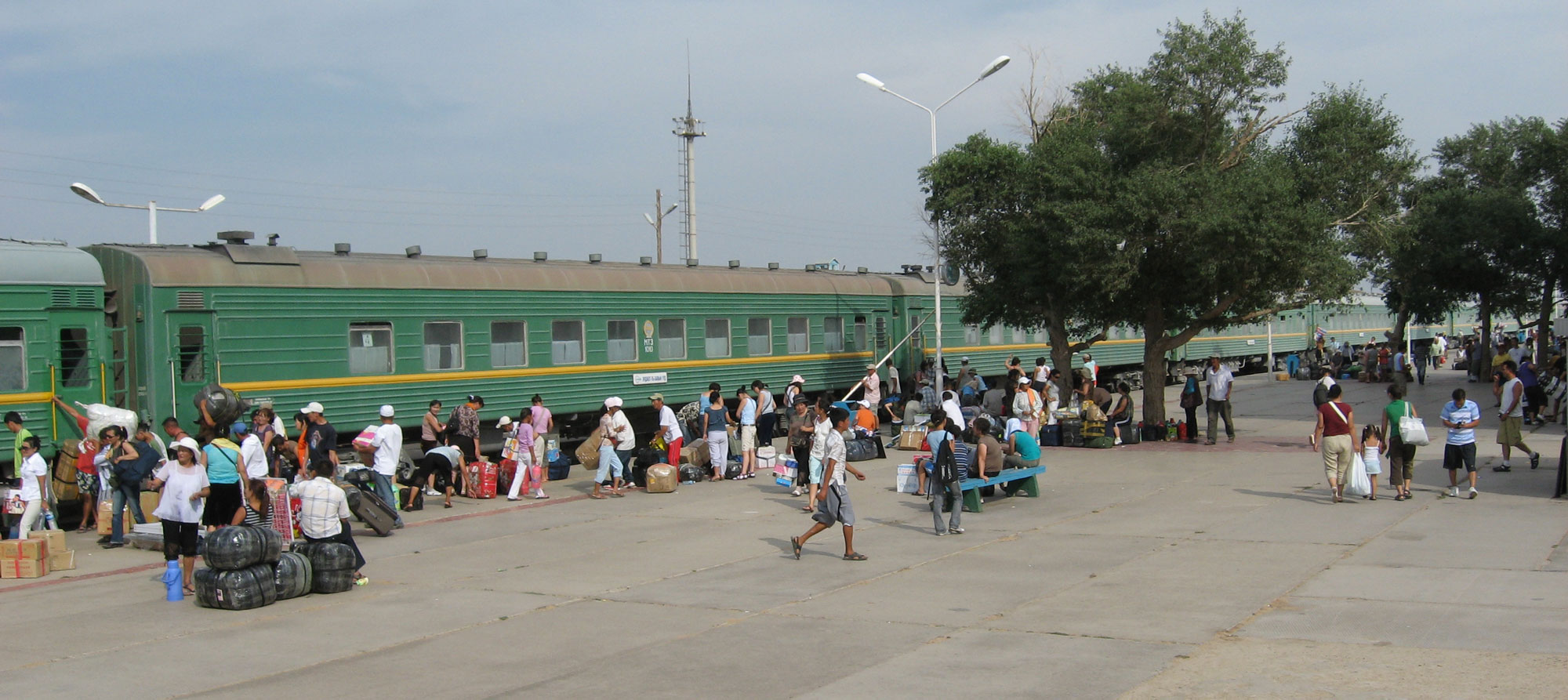
Traders in Zamyn-Üüd station, Dornogovi aimag

The Trans-Mongolian Railway connects the Trans-Siberian Railway from Ulan Ude in Russia to Erenhot and Beijing in China through the capital Ulaanbaatar. The Mongolian section of this line runs for 1110 km. A spur line connects Darkhan to the copper mines of Erdenet; another spur line connects Ulaanbaatar with the coal mines of Baganuur. A separate railway line is in the east of the country between Choibalsan and the Trans-Siberian at Borzya; however, that line is closed to passengers beyond the Mongolian town of Chuluunkhoroot.

For domestic transport, daily trains run from Ulaanbaatar to Darkhan, Sukhbaatar, and Erdenet, as well as Zamiin-Üüd, Choir and Sainshand. Mongolia uses the 1,520 mm (4 ft 11 27/32 in) (Russian gauge) track system. The total length of the system is 1,810 km. In 2007, rail transport carried 93% of Mongolian freight and 43% of passenger turnover (in tons*km and passenger*km, respectively).

During the 2022–2023 period, three railway lines — Tavantolgoi–Zuunbayan, Tavantolgoi–Gashuunsuhut, and Zuunbayan–Khangi — with a total length of nearly 900 kilometers, were put into operation.

In October 2026, the new 127-kilometer railway line connecting Bagakhangai, Khushig, and Emeelt was put into service.

== Roadways ==
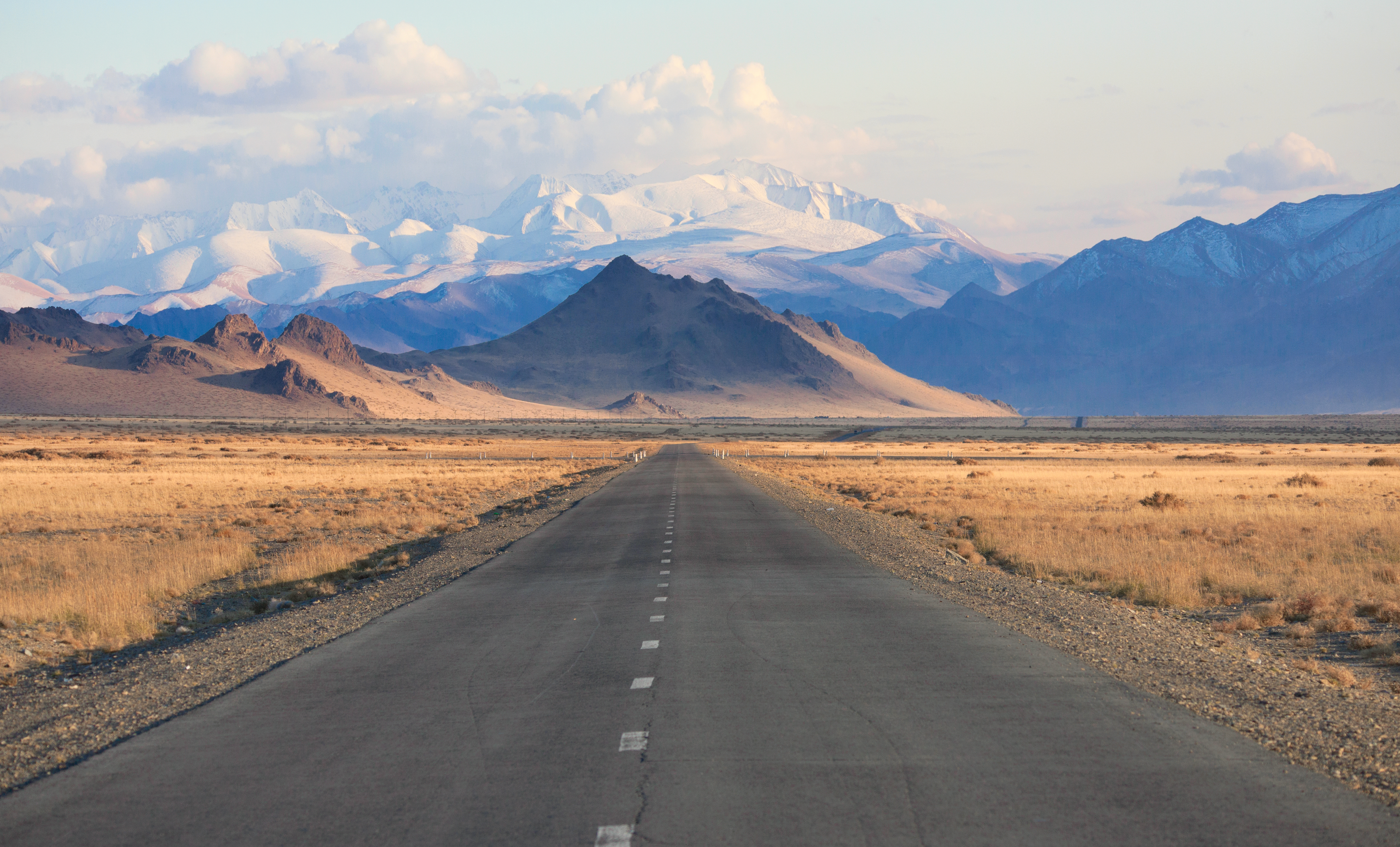
A0306 National Highway in Bayan-Ölgii Province

In 2007, only about 2600 km of Mongolia's road network were paved. Another 3900 km are graveled or otherwise improved. This network of paved roads was expanded to 4,800 km in 2013, with 1,800 km completed in 2014 alone. This included the roads from Ulaanbaatar to the Russian and Chinese borders, paved road from Ulaanbaatar to Kharkhorin and Bayankhongor, another going south to Mandalgovi, and a partly parallel road from Lün to Dashinchilen, as well as the road from Darkhan to Bulgan via Erdenet. The vast majority of Mongolia's official road network, some 40,000 km, are simple cross-country tracks.

Construction is underway on an east–west road (the so-called Millennium Road) that incorporates the road from Ulaanbaatar to Arvaikheer and on the extension of the Darkhan-Bulgan road beyond Bulgan. In 2022, the "Millennium Road" highway was completed, stretching approximately 2,668 km, connecting all 21 of the country's aimags from west to east with Ulaanbaatar and providing through-passage across the entire country. Private bus and minibus companies offer service from Ulaanbaatar to most aimag centers.

In September and December 2014 roads connecting Dalanzadgad town of Ömnögovi Province and Mörön town of Khuvsgul province with capital city of Ulaanbaatar were completed.

In 2019, the first expressway in Mongolia opened, the Ulaanbaatar Airport Expressway.

On October 17, 2026, Mongolia commissioned a new 240.3-kilometer highway connecting the Tavan Tolgoi mining deposit group (Tsogtsetsii soum, Umnugovi aimag) to the Gashuun Sukhait border checkpoint on the border with China.

=== Buses ===
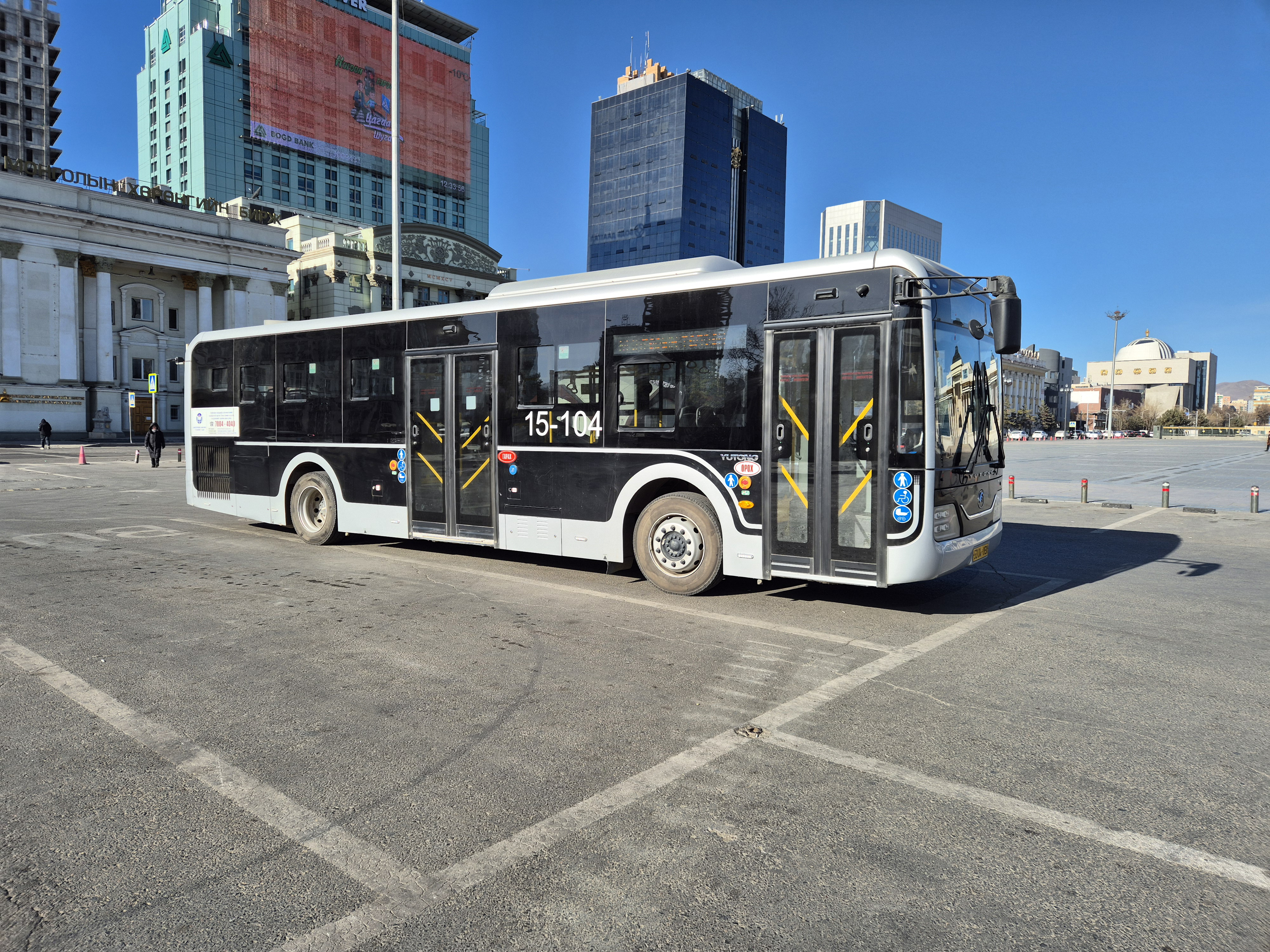
Bus in Ulaanbaatar

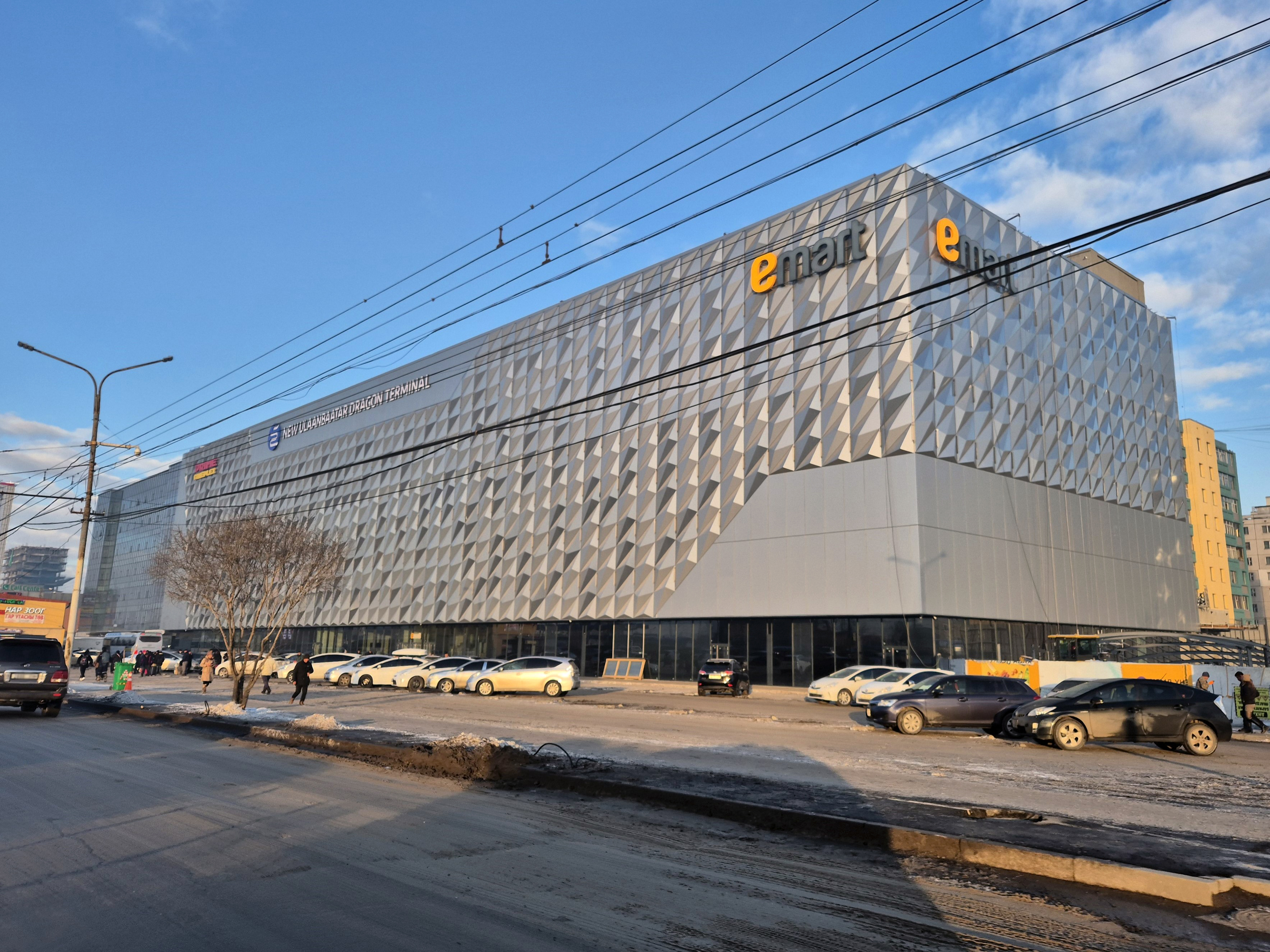
Main bus terminal of Ulaanbaatar

The history of public transport in Mongolia starts with the creation of <<Mongoltrans>> council in 1929. The first public bus route was between Ulaanbaatar city and then-city Amgalan with 5 rides a day. Currently, buses are the main mode of public transportation in Ulaanbaatar. Buses pass stops at approximately 15-minute intervals. Buses runs between 7:00am and 10:00pm. The 1,200 daily buses of 21 companies serve the people on 79 routes in the capital city.

There is a daily international bus service between Ulan-Ude, Russia and Ulaanbaatar, Mongolia.

There is relatively developed bus transport between cities of Mongolia from minivans to large coach buses (usually up to 45 seats). The national and municipal governments regulate a wide system of private transit providers which operate numerous bus lines around the city. Ulaanbaatar trolleybus system is defunct as of 2025, however, the electric lines are still intact on some parts. Tenuun Ogoo LLC, Erdem Trans LLC and Sutain buyant LLC are major bus operators.

=== Taxis ===
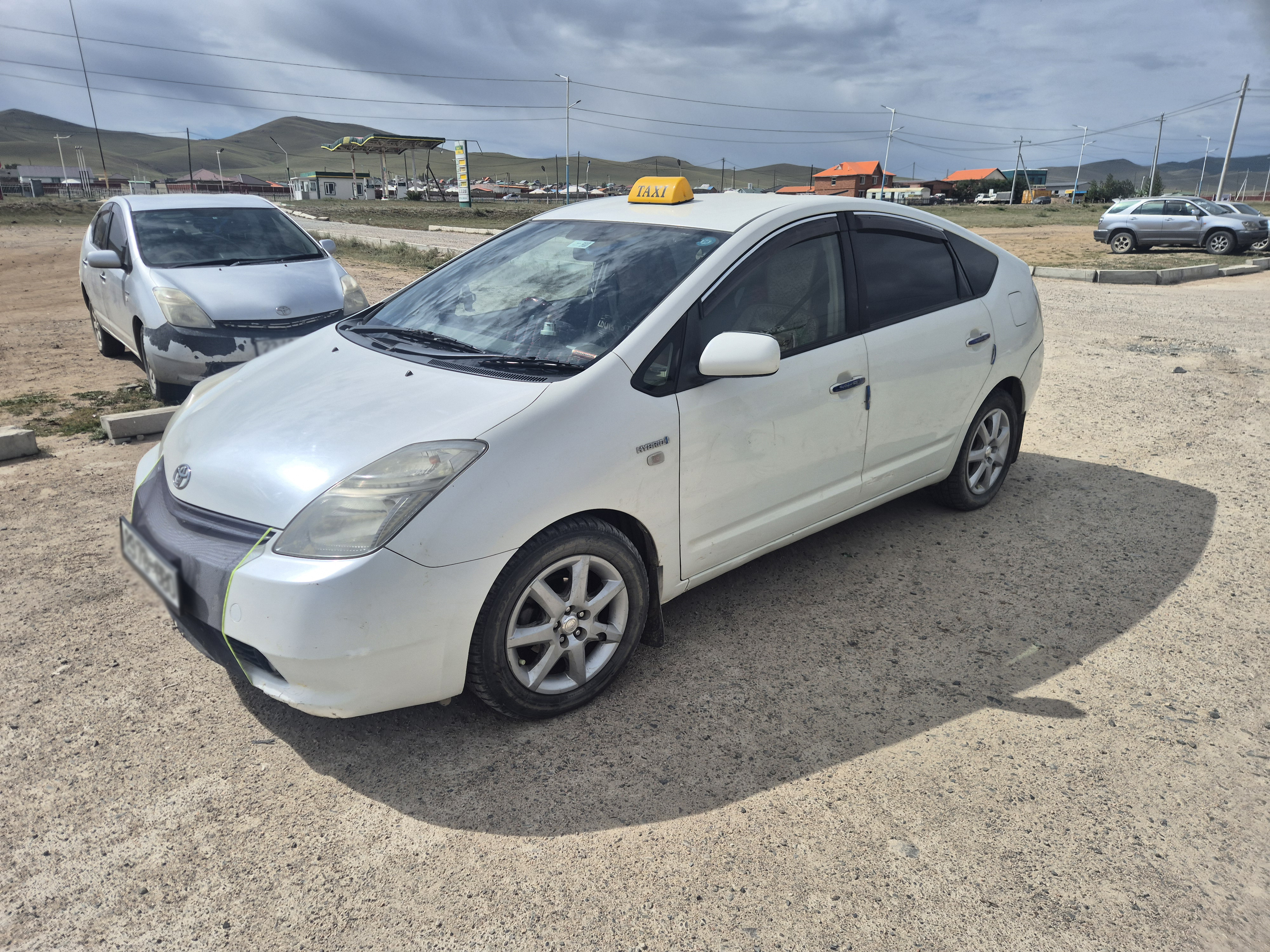
Taxi in Kharkhorin

There are about 10 licensed taxi companies such as Get Airport Taxi (UbShuttle) Noyon taxi (1950), Telecom taxi (1109), 1616 taxi (1616) with about 600 cars operating in Ulaanbaatar. There are a few local taxi companies in smaller cities such as Darkhan, Erdenet, Baganuur and Zuunmod. And there are many drivers with private unlicensed cars who act as taxis.

A typical fare is MNT 1,500 per kilometer; taxi drivers tend to ask for more especially if the client is a foreign national. Official taxis with proper markings are allowed to drive without plate number restrictions on the first lane of Ulaanbaatar's central road usually reserved for large public transports such as buses and trolleybuses since October 2013.

=== Ride-hailing ===
Several app-based taxi services operate in Mongolia. TinoGo, UBCab, ABA and other platforms. These services typically GPS-based and support both cash, cashless payments.

== Waterways ==
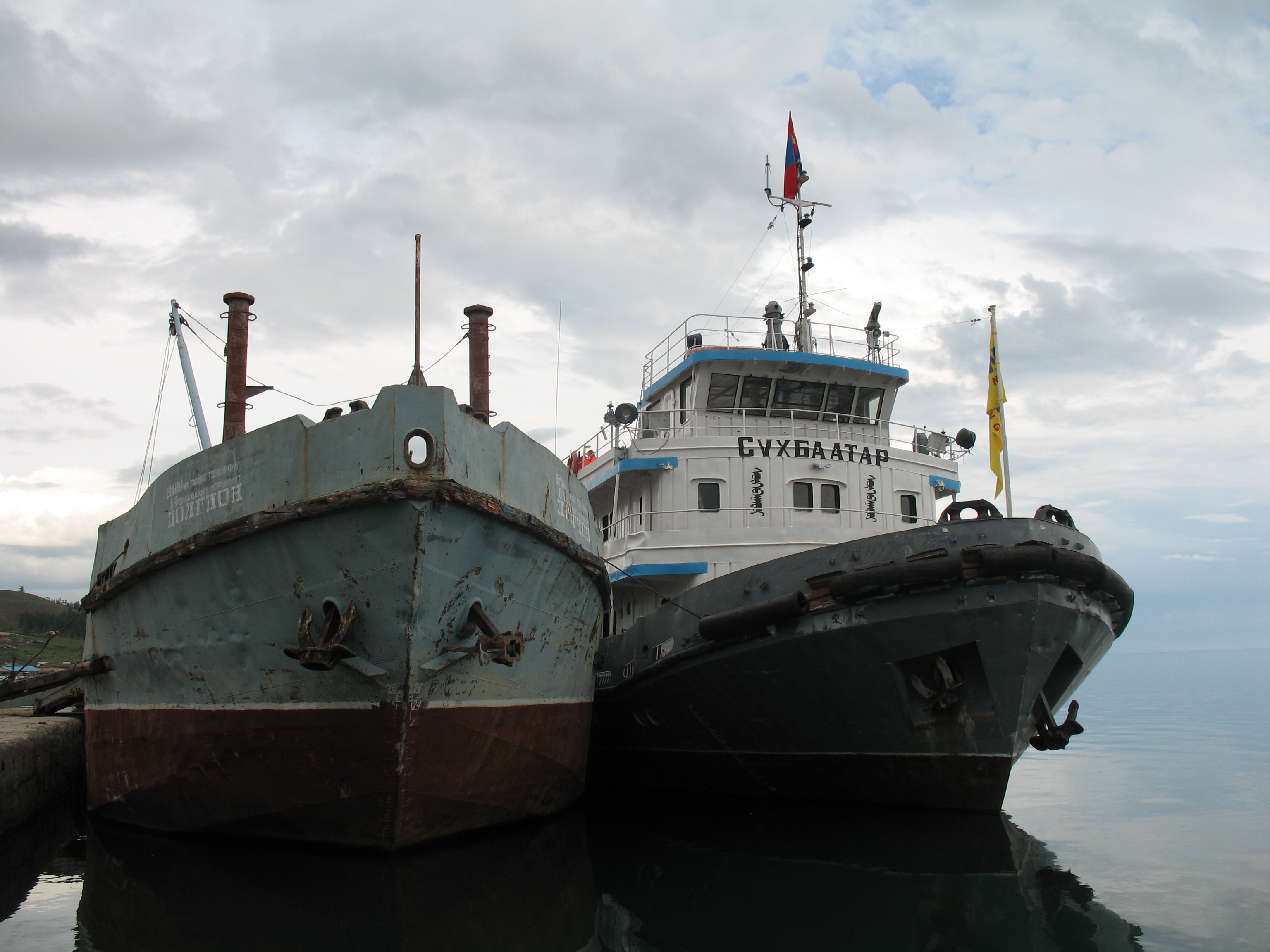
Ships in Lake Khövsgöl

Mongolia has 580 km of waterways, but only Lake Khövsgöl has ever been heavily used. The Selenge (270 km) and Orkhon (175 km) rivers are navigable but carry little traffic, although a customs boat patrols the Selenge to the Russian border. Lake Khovsgol has charter boats for tourists. The lakes and rivers freeze over in the winter and are usually open between May and September.

== Air transport ==
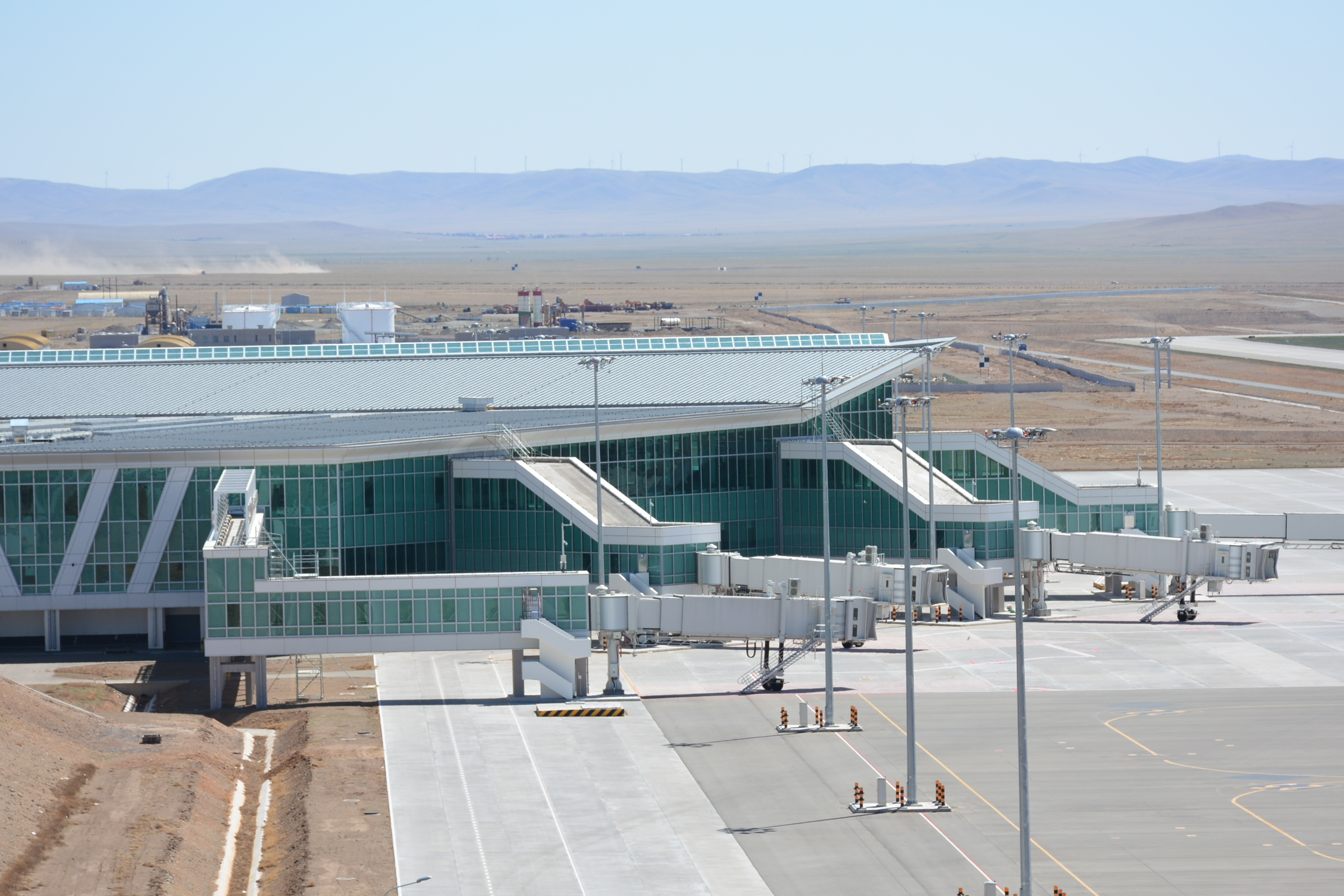
Chinggis Khaan International Airport

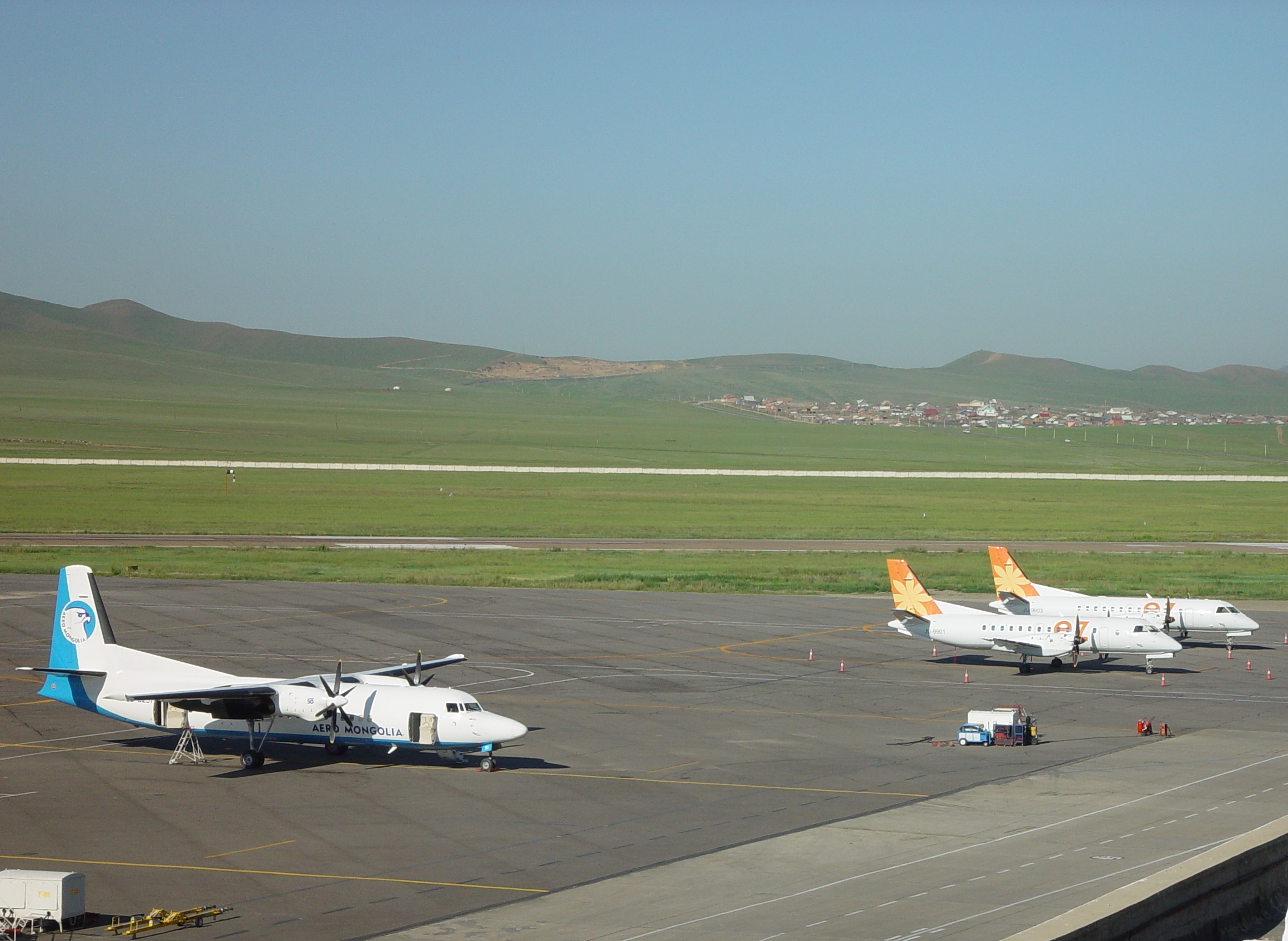
Aircraft of two Mongolian domestic airlines at ULN

MIAT Mongolian Airlines is the country's flag carrier and first airline, operating since 1956. It conducted scheduled domestic flights in the communist era with its hub at Buyant-Ukhaa International Airport (built 1961), and started international routes in 1987. With the onset of the democratic revolution, the airline gradually adopted modern jet airliners and expanded its international operations. Since the 2000s, private operators such as Aero Mongolia, Hunnu Air, and Eznis Airways commenced flights, dominating domestic air routes in the country. In 2023, MIAT Mongolian Airlines resumed domestic flights after 15 years under the brand name MIAT Regional. As of 2026, there are almost two dozen airlines flying in and out of Mongolia on regular or seasonal basis.

Mongolia opened the new Chinggis Khaan International Airport (UBN) in July 2021, located about 50 km from the center of Ulaanbaatar. Replacing Buyant-Ukhaa, it is the country's only international airport. Most airports of the 21 aimag centers of Mongolia have paved runways, but those closest to Ulaanbaatar lack scheduled air service.

Ulaanbaatar can be accessed with direct flights to various locations in Europe and Asia and seasonal flights from the USA.
