= Donoi Airport =

Airport in Zavkhan, Mongolia

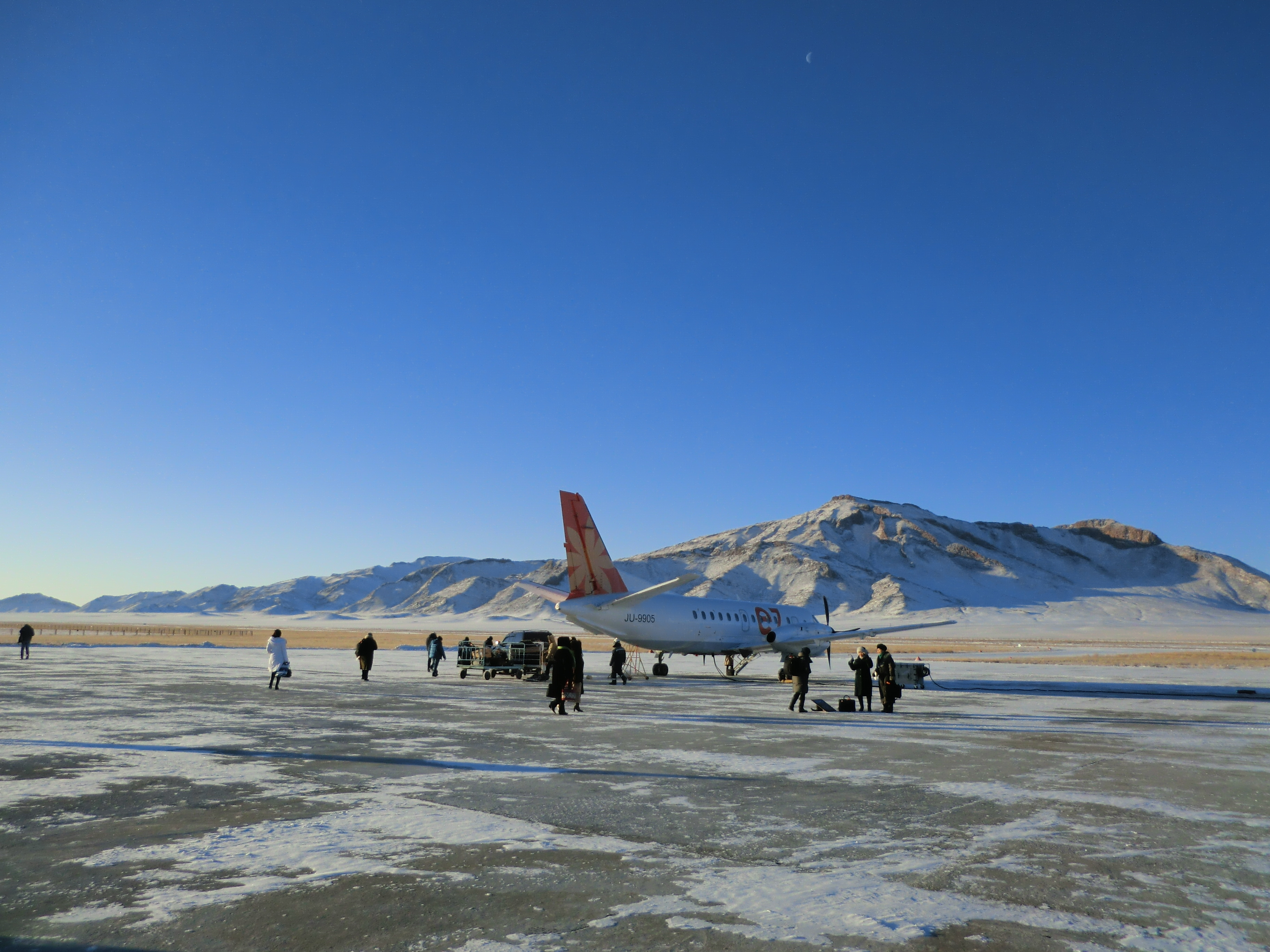
- Passengers boarding a propeller plane to Ulaanbaatar at Donoi Airport
- IATA: ULZ; ICAO: ZMDN

Summary
- Airport type: Joint (civil and military)
- Operator: Civil Aviation Authority of Mongolia
- Location: Uliastai
- Elevation AMSL: 5,800 ft / 1,749 m
- Coordinates: 47°42′46″N 96°31′27″E

Map
- Location of airport in Mongolia ULZ (Asia) ULZ (Earth)

Runways
Direction	Length		Surface
Direction	ft	m	Surface
16/34	10,498	3,200	Grass
16/34	(9,400)	(2,880)	Asphalt

Statistics (2010 ULZ)
- Passengers: 5400
- Sources: Civil Aviation Administration of Mongolia

Donoi Airport (IATA: ULZ, ICAO: ZMDN) is a public airport located about 24 kilometers west of Uliastai, the capital of Zavkhan Province in Mongolia. It is also called New Uliastai Airport.

== Airlines and destinations ==
Airlines	Destinations
MIAT Mongolian Airlines	Ulaanbaatar

== See also ==
- List of airports in Mongolia
