= Chinggis Khaan International Airport =

Main airport of Mongolia

Chinggis Khaan International Airport Чингис хаан олон улсын нисэх онгоцны буудал ᠴᠢᠩᠭᠢᠰ ᠬᠠᠭᠠᠨ ᠣᠯᠠᠨ ᠤᠯᠤᠰ ᠤᠨ ᠨᠢᠰᠬᠦ ᠣᠩᠭᠣᠴᠠᠨ ᠤ ᠪᠠᠭᠤᠳᠠᠯ

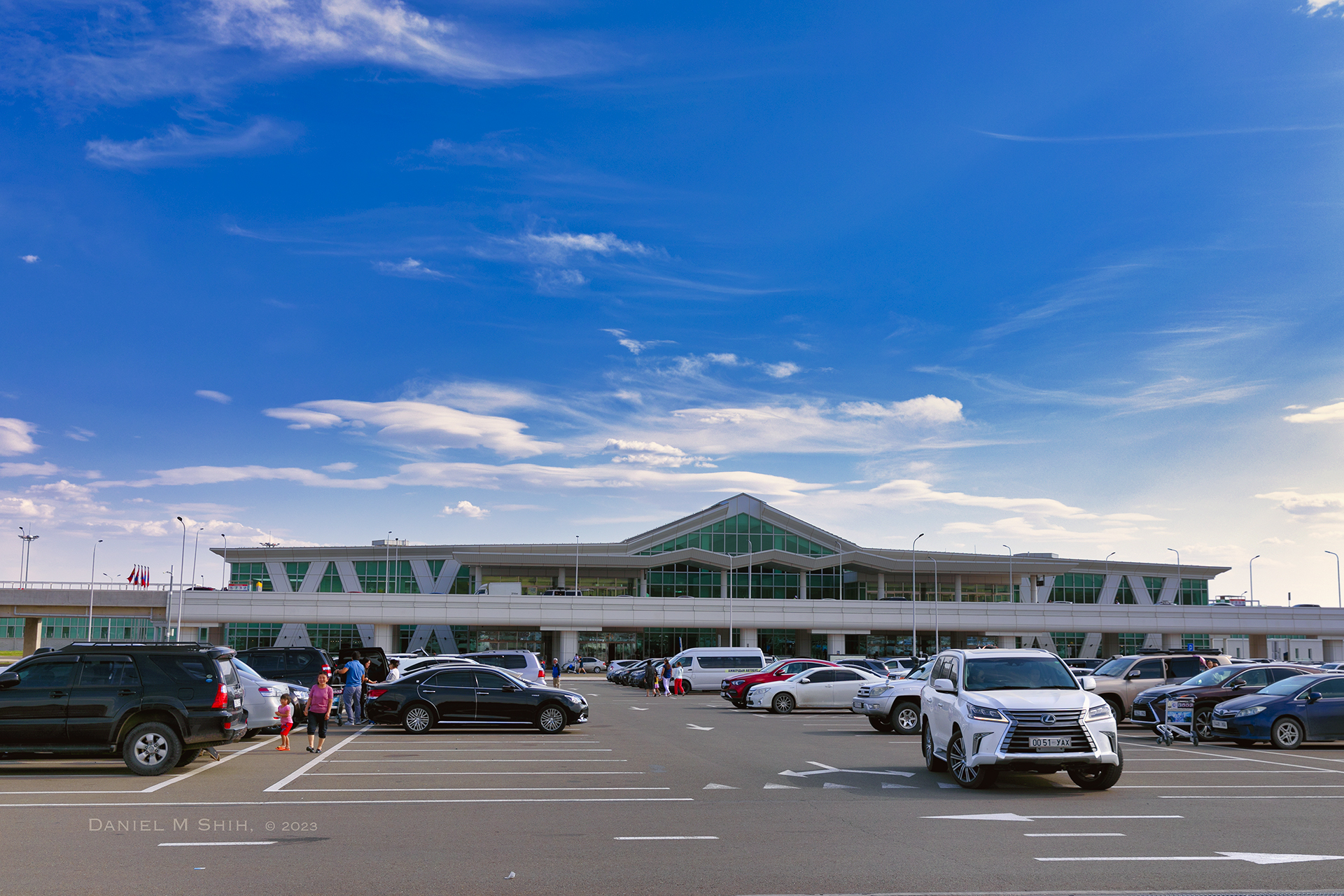
- IATA: UBN; ICAO: ZMCK

Summary
- Airport type: Public
- Owner: Government of Mongolia
- Operator: New Ulaanbaatar International Airport LLC
- Serves: Ulaanbaatar, Mongolia
- Location: Sergelen, Töv, Mongolia
- Opened: 4 July 2021; 5 years ago
- Hub for: Aero Mongolia; Hunnu Air; MIAT Mongolian Airlines
- Elevation AMSL: 1,366 m (4,482 ft)
- Coordinates: 47°39′05″N 106°49′17″E
- Website: ulaanbaatar-airport.mn

Map
- Location within Mongolia UBN (Asia)

Runways
| Direction | Length | | Surface |
| Direction | m | ft | Surface |
|---|---|---|---|
| 11/29 | 3,600 | 11,811 | Concrete |

Chinggis Khaan International Airport (Note: Mongolian: Чингис хаан олон улсын нисэх онгоцны буудал, romanized: Chingis khaan olon ulsiin nisekh ongocnii buudal, pronounced [tɕʰiŋkɪ̆s χaːɴ ɔɮə̆ɴ ʊɮsíːɴ nisɘ̆x ɔɴqə̆tsʰní pʊ́ːtə̆ɮ]) (IATA: UBN, ICAO: ZMCK), also referred to as New Ulaanbaatar International Airport, (Note: Mongolian: Улаанбаатар хотын олон улсын шинэ нисэх онгоцны буудал, romanized: Ulaanbaatar khotiin olon ulsiin shine nisekh ongocnii buudal, pronounced [ʊɮáːmpatʰə̆r χɔtʰíɴ ɔɮə̆ɴ ʊɮsíːɴ ɕinɘ̆ nisɘ̆x pʊ́ːtəɮ]) is the primary airport serving Ulaanbaatar, and is Mongolia's main international airport. It opened on 4 July 2021, replacing Buyant-Ukhaa International Airport.

It is the largest air facility in the country, serving as a hub for all major Mongolian airlines, and is located in the Khöshig Valley of Sergelen, Töv Province, 52 km south of Ulaanbaatar and 20 km southwest of Zuunmod. The airport is connected via highway to Ulaanbaatar, with shuttle bus routes operating to and from various points in the city. It features direct flights to 11 domestic destinations and various international destinations in Asia and Europe.

In 2024, it served over 2.1 million domestic and international passengers.

== History ==
=== Origin ===
Ulaanbaatar's former main airport, Buyant-Ukhaa International Airport, established in 1957, is located in close proximity to two mountains to its south and east, so only one end of its runway was able to be used, and was often adversely affected by weather events. The new airport was designed with a capacity of handling up to 1,100 passengers per hour and three million passengers per year, with cargo capacity set at 11,900 tons. Its development was majority funded by a Japanese government (JICA) soft loan (93%), with the rest provided by the Mongolian government.

=== Development ===
Initial planning for the airport was done in 2006 with Japanese government assistance. In May 2008, a ¥28.8 billion (US$385 million) 40-year soft loan agreement at 0.2% interest was signed between the Government of Mongolia and the Japan Bank for International Cooperation to build a new international airport. The loan required that the project is to be carried out by Japanese consultants and contractors; however, the materials and equipment the contractors use could be up to 70% from any country. Between 2009 and 2011, Azusa Sekkei and Oriental Consultants Joint Venture made the design and bid documentation for the airport. In 2011, a call for bids was announced for the construction of the airport, with the Mitsubishi-Chiyoda Joint Venture (MCJV) successful in the technical bidding. An extended price review and contract negotiation were completed on 10 May 2013 when the main construction contract was signed between MCJV and the Civil Aviation Authority of Mongolia. The final amount of loans from the Japanese Government for the development of the airport totaled ¥65.6 billion (US$600 million), to be paid over forty years.

=== Construction and opening ===
The groundbreaking ceremony was on 22 April 2012, with initial construction starting with a site flood-protection scheme. Other works under way included the construction of the electric power line from Nalaikh. Main construction lasted from May 2013 to April 2020. The concrete pouring work for the control tower started on 13 September 2013. On 29 January 2014, the airport's electric substation construction was completed and connected to the Mongolian central grid. Construction of a six-lane, 30 km-long highway to Ulaanbaatar started in May 2016, and ended in 2019.

While the initial opening date was slated for December 2016, the bulk of construction only ended in 2017. Opening of the airport was repeatedly delayed to 2018, 2019, 2020, and 2021. These delays were related to contract negotiations regarding the operation and ownership of the airport, the construction of the highway to Ulaanbaatar, and the impact of the COVID-19 pandemic in Mongolia.

Operations at the airport started on 4 July 2021, with an inaugural flight to Tokyo operated by MIAT Mongolian Airlines, flying Ulaanbaatar-Narita-Ulaanbaatar with a Boeing 737.

The airport was referred to by various names during its planning and construction phases, including New Ulaanbaatar International Airport and Khöshig (or Khöshigt) Valley Airport. (Note: Mongolian: Хөшигийн (Хөшигтийн) хөндийн нисэх буудал, romanized: Höshigiin (Höshigtiin) höndiin niseh buudal, [xɵɕʲˈgʲin (xɵɕʲkˈtʲin) xɵɲˈtʲiŋ ˈɲisɪç ˈpʊˑtəɮ]) The new airport was given its current name on 2 July 2020, with the former Chinggis Khaan International Airport reverting to its pre-2005 name of Buyant-Ukhaa International Airport. Chinggis Khaan is a transliteration of the modern Mongolian pronunciation of Genghis Khan.

In July 2024, Nippon Koei was contracted to perform an assessment regarding the expansion of the airport.

In May 2025, United Airlines began fifth-freedom flights to Tokyo on a Boeing 737-800 3x weekly.

In September 2026, the Mongolian and Japanese governments signed an agreement to proceed with an expansion of the airport due to constraints in the current facilities. The loan agreement, signed in Tokyo on 29 September 2026 by Mongolia's Minister of Finance and the president of the Japan International Cooperation Agency, provides up to ¥158.3 billion at 1.1% annual interest, repayable over 40 years, for a new passenger terminal, taxiways, aprons, parking facilities and access roads, with the new facilities scheduled to begin operating in December 2033. The expansion is intended to raise the airport's annual passenger capacity to 5.2 million.

== Facilities ==
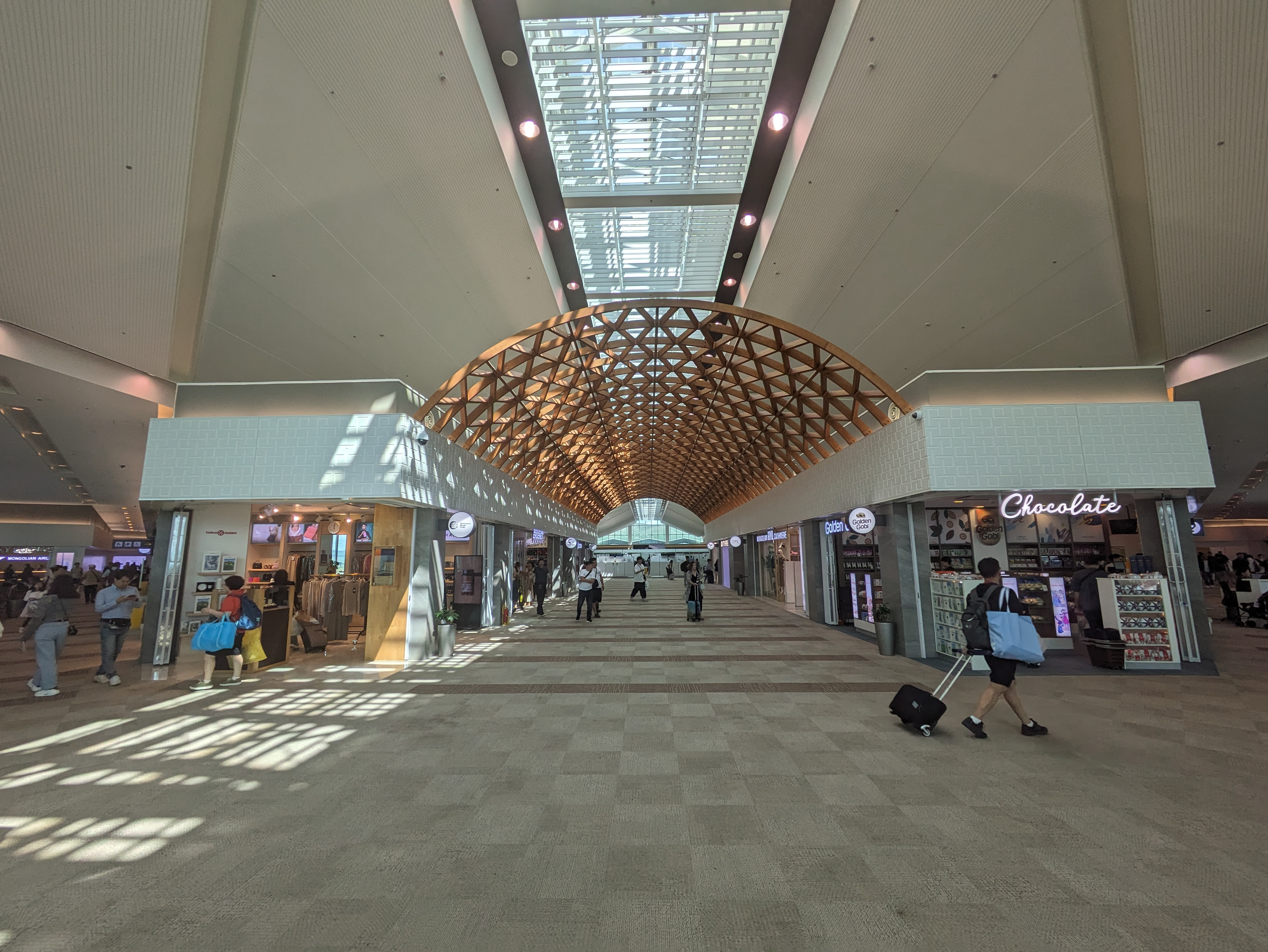
Terminal interior

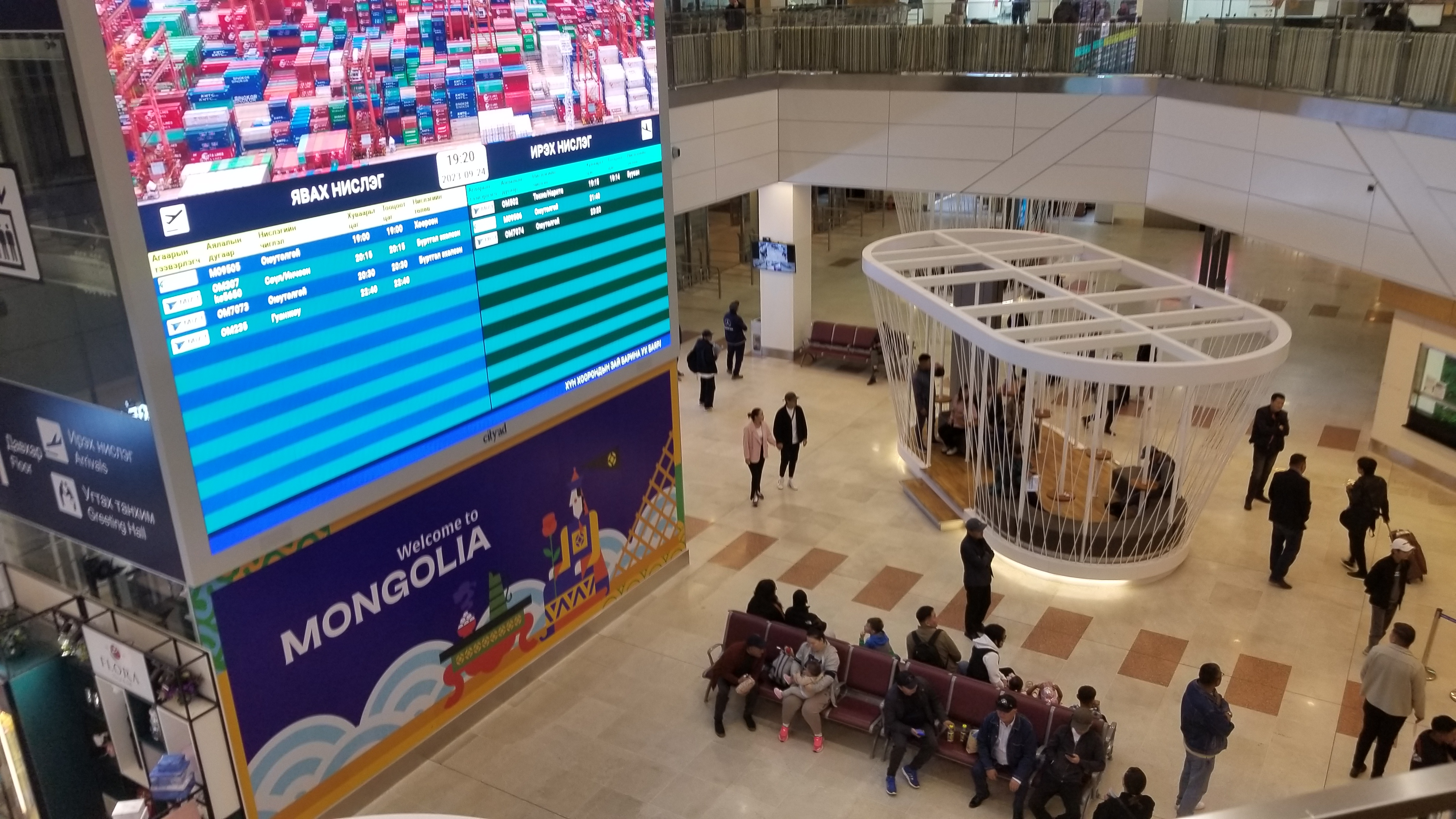
Terminal interior

The airport covers an area of 104,200 m^{2}. It has one runway with a length of 3,600 metres (11,800 ft) and width of 45 metres (148 ft). It also contains a 3,339 metres (10,955 ft) (23 metres (75 ft) wide) parallel taxiway, two rapid taxiways, and three exit taxiways.

=== Terminal ===
The airport's passenger terminals have an area of 25,300 square metres (272,000 sq ft) with arrivals on the first (ground floor) and departures on the second floor.

=== Cargo ===
The cargo terminal has an area of 3,750 square metres (40,400 sq ft), with the airport having a yearly cargo capacity of 11,900 tonnes. It also contains separate facilities for the import/export of dangerous, high-value, and refrigerated goods.

== Ownership ==
Chinggis Khaan International Airport is managed by New Ulaanbaatar International Airport LLC (Mongolian: Нью Улаанбаатар интернэйшнл эйрпорт ХХК), which is responsible for the airport's operations until 2036. It was formed as a partnership between two companies: Japan Airport Management LLC (owned by Mitsubishi Corporation, Narita International Airport Corporation, Japan Airport Terminal, and JALUX), and will hold 51% of the company, while Khushigiin Khundii Airport (Mongolian: Хөшигийн хөндийн нисэх онгоцны буудал ТӨХХК), funded by the Government of Mongolia, owns a 49% stake. JALUX manages the airport's retail businesses.

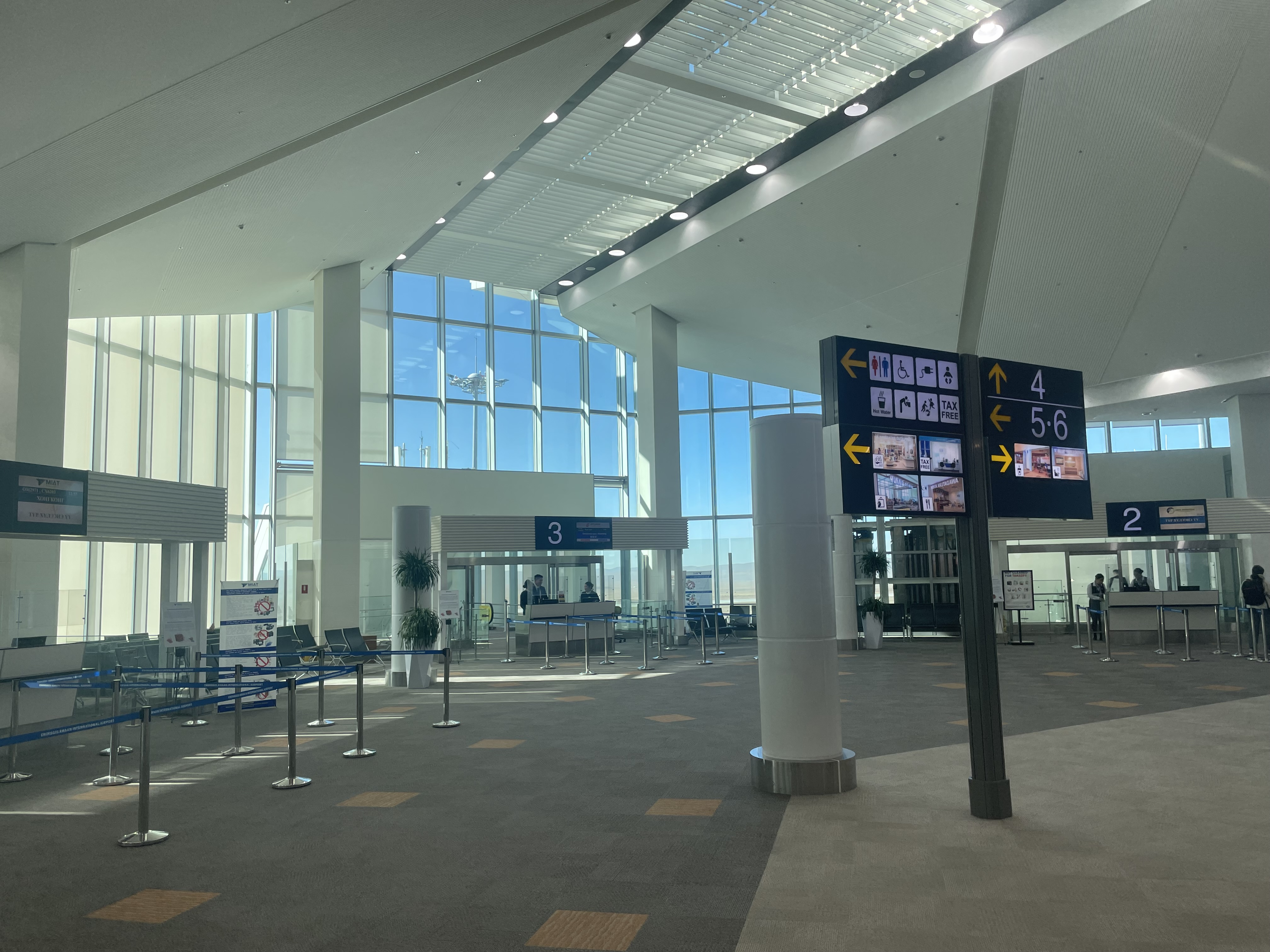
Waiting area

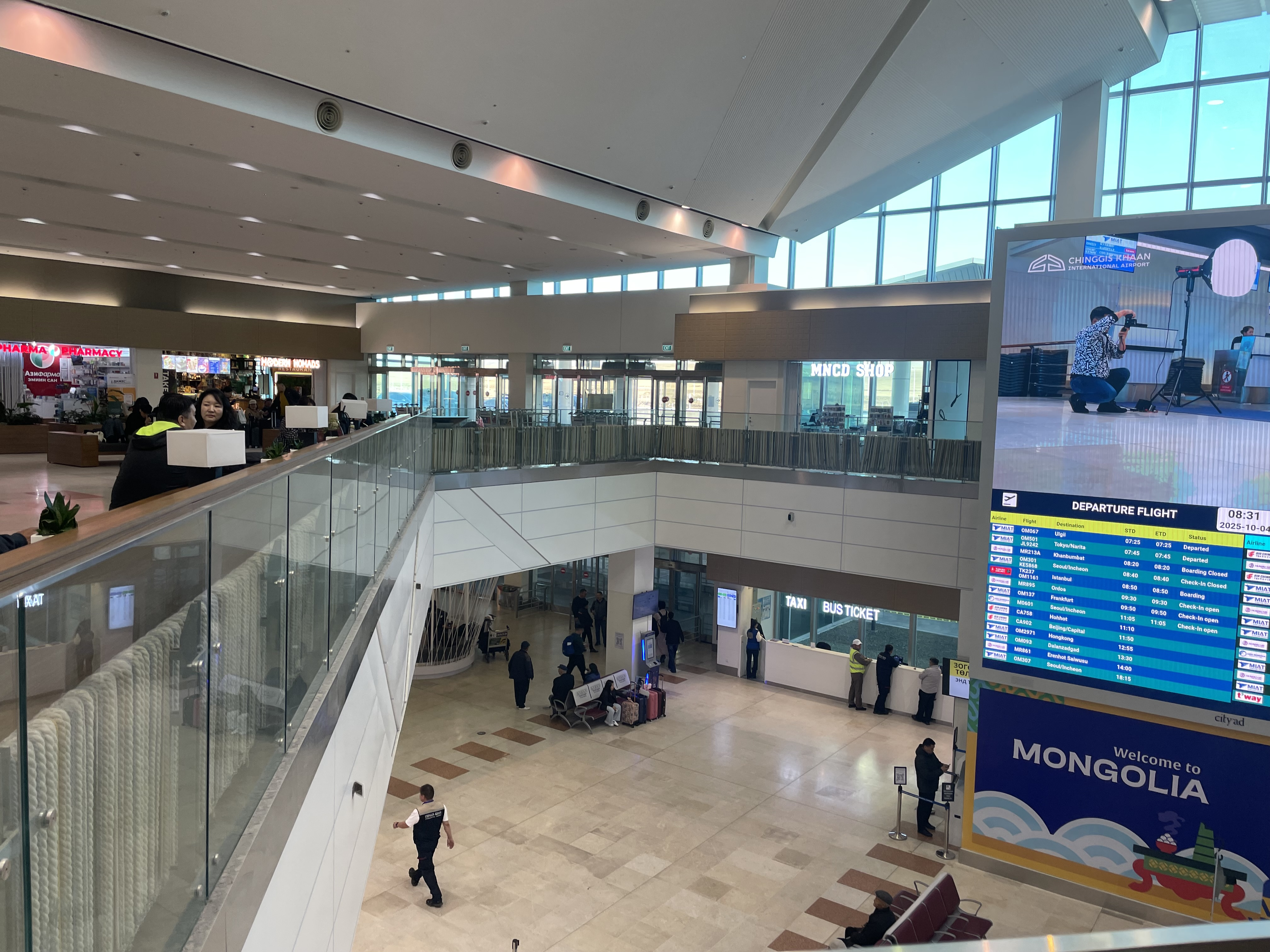
Terminal interior, 2025

== Airlines and destinations ==
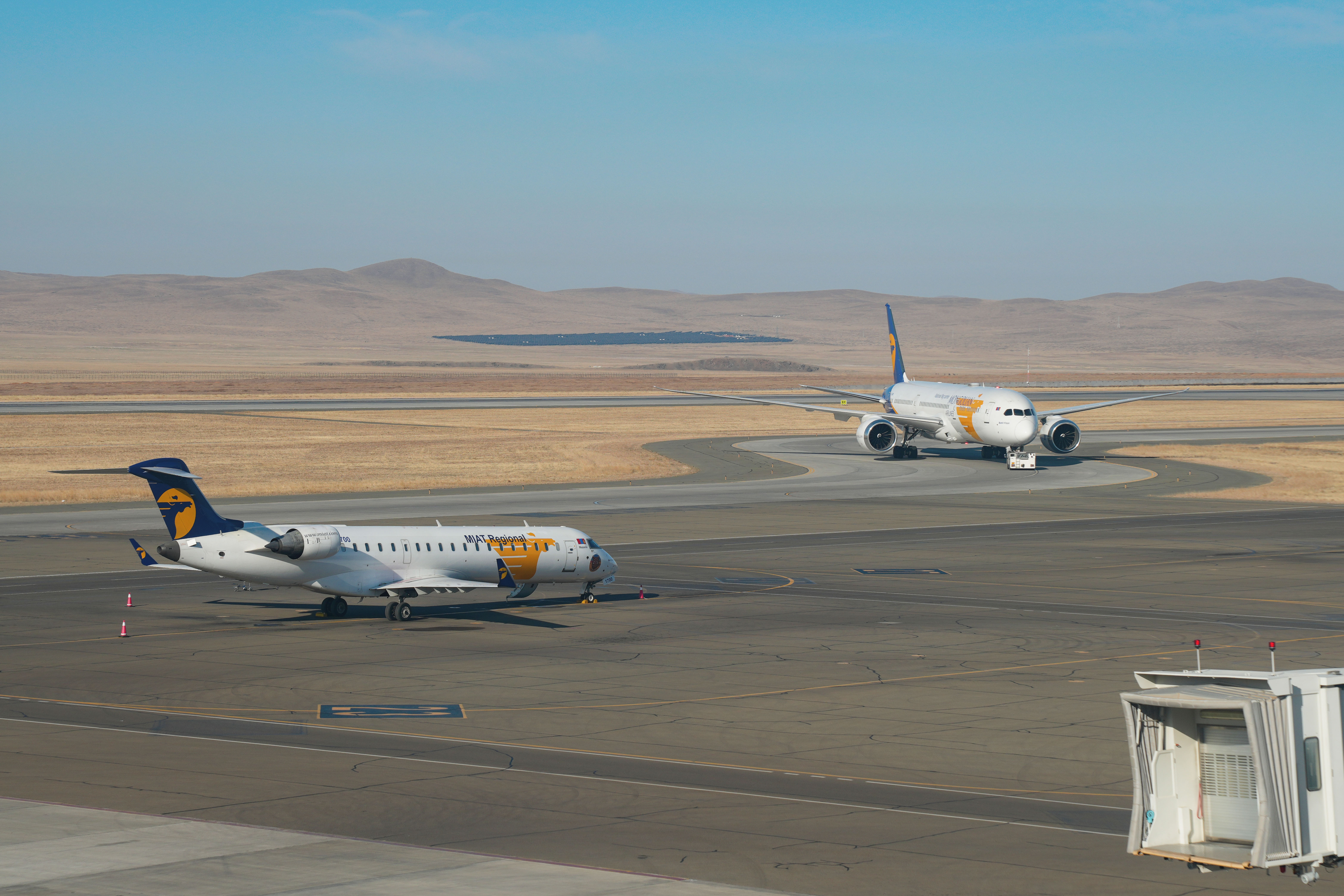
MIAT Mongolian Airlines aircraft at UBN

| Airlines | Destinations |
|---|---|
| Aero K | Cheongju |
| Aero Mongolia | Hohhot, Seoul–Incheon, Tokyo–Narita |
| Air Busan | Busan |
| Air China | Beijing–Capital, Hohhot |
| Asiana Airlines | Seoul–Incheon |
| China United Airlines | Ordos |
| Hunnu Air | Almaty, Beijing–Daxing, Delhi, Erenhot, Manzhouli, Ölgii, Shenzhen; Seasonal charter: Manila, Yangyang |
| IrAero | Irkutsk |
| Jeju Air | Busan, Seoul–Incheon |
| Jin Air | Busan |
| Juneyao Air | Sanya |
| Korean Air | Seoul–Incheon |
| KrasAvia | Krasnoyarsk–International; Seasonal: Kyzyl |
| MIAT Mongolian Airlines | Altai, Beijing–Capital, Busan, Dalanzadgad, Frankfurt, Guangzhou, Hohhot, Hong Kong, Istanbul, Khovd, Mörön, Ölgii, Seoul–Incheon, Shanghai–Pudong, Tokyo–Narita, Ulaangom, Uliastai; Seasonal: Bangkok–Suvarnabhumi, Ho Chi Minh City, Osaka–Kansai, Singapore, Phuket |
| S7 Airlines | Irkutsk (begins 15 December 2026) |
| Spring Airlines | Shanghai–Pudong |
| Trinity Airways | Cheongju; Seasonal: Daegu, Seoul–Incheon |
| Turkish Airlines | Istanbul |
| United Airlines | Seasonal: Tokyo–Narita |
| VietJet Air | Nha Trang; Seasonal charter: Phu Quoc |

== Statistics ==
Annual statistics
| Year | Domestic passengers | International passengers | Domestic aircraft movements | International aircraft movements | Domestic cargo (tonnes) | International cargo (tonnes) |
|---|---|---|---|---|---|---|
| 2022 | 333,805 | 618,960 | 8,819 | 5,334 | 24.2 | 12,869 |
| 2023 | 419,014 | 1,312,173 | 10,310 | 9,654 | 17.9 | 8,555 |
| 2024 | 420,395 | 1,746,875 | 10,967 | 12,990 | 28.3 | 10,366 |
| 2025 | 442,253 | 2,006,162 | 12,228 | 15,352 | 39.7 | 12,466 |

Top international routes by passenger count, 2024
| Destination | Passengers to | Passengers from |
|---|---|---|
| Seoul-Incheon | 319,372 | 314,928 |
| Beijing-Capital | 139,749 | 132,650 |
| Istanbul | 71,151 | 75,486 |
| Tokyo-Narita | 63,619 | 61,470 |
| Hong Kong | 50,760 | 48,366 |

Top domestic routes by passenger count, 2024
| Destination | Passengers to | Passengers from |
|---|---|---|
| Khanbumbat (Oyu Tolgoi) | 170,662 | 171,938 |
| Khovd | 8,370 | 8,897 |
| Mörön | 6,148 | 8,469 |
| Ölgii | 6,920 | 6,776 |
| Dalanzadgad | 4,853 | 4,522 |

== Ground transportation ==
The airport is connected to Ulaanbaatar by highway, and is approximately 50 kilometres (31 mi) from the city center. Shuttle buses, taxis, and private vehicles connect the airport and the city.

== See also ==
- List of airports in Mongolia
