= Ölgii International Airport =

Airport in Ölgii, Bayan-Ölgii, Mongolia

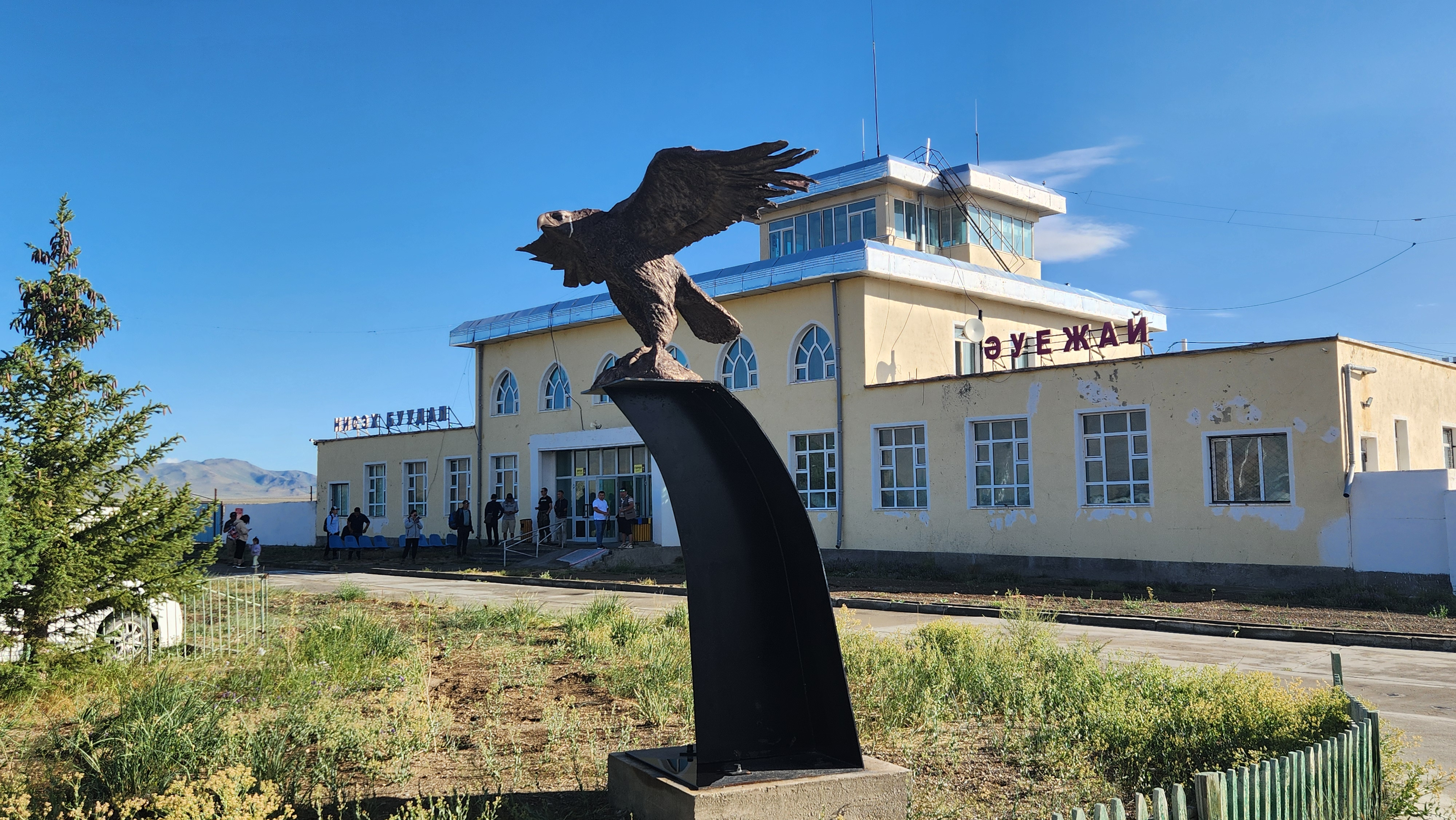
- Airport in 2024
- IATA: ULG; ICAO: ZMUL

Summary
- Airport type: Public / Military
- Owner: Civil Aviation Authority of Mongolia
- Location: Khust Aral, Ölgii, Bayan-Ölgii, Mongolia
- Opened: July 25, 1958; 67 years ago
- Built: 2004
- Time zone: Hovd Time (UTC+7)
- Coordinates: 48°59′30″N 89°55′11″E
- Website: ulgii.mcaa.gov.mn

Map
- Location of airport in Mongolia ULG (Asia) ULG (Earth)

Runways
Direction	Length		Surface
Direction	ft	m	Surface
13/31	9,350	2,850	Concrete

Statistics (2010 ULG)
- Passengers: 13000
- Sources: Civil Aviation Authority of Mongolia Official website

Ölgii International Airport (IATA: ULG, ICAO: ZMUL) is an international airport located in Ölgii, the capital of Bayan-Ölgii Province in Mongolia.

== Airlines and destinations ==
Airlines	Destinations
MIAT Mongolian Airlines	Ulaanbaatar

== See also ==
- List of airports in Mongolia
