= Hunnu Air =

Mongolian airline

- Hunnu Air Embraer 190
IATA	ICAO	Call sign
MR	MML	TRANS MONGOLIA
- Founded: 2011; 15 years ago
- Hubs: Chinggis Khaan International Airport
- Fleet size: 4
- Destinations: 10
- Parent company: Mongolyn Alt MAK LLC
- Headquarters: Sükhbaatar district, Ulaanbaatar, Mongolia
- Key people: Nyamtaishir (Director of Board)
- Website: hunnuair.com

Hunnu Air (Mongolian: Хүннү Эйр, romanized: Hünnü Eir) is a Mongolian airline that began scheduled flights in 2011. The company changed its name from Mongolian Airlines Group (Mongolian: Монголиан Аэрлайнес Групп) in April 2013 to avoid confusion with the similarly named Mongolian international flag carrier MIAT Mongolian Airlines. The company slogan is Wings of Mongolia. The name Hunnu refers to the Mongolian spelling of the Xiongnu.

== History ==
Hunnu Air is backed by the mining company Mongolyn Alt MAK LLC and the Bodi Group. The airline was launched as Mongolian Airlines on 2 December 2011 following the acquisition of Monnis Air Services and its fleet of Antonov An-2 single-engine biplane aircraft. Confusion soon arose over the name and its similarity to that of MIAT Mongolian Airlines and in April 2013, threatened with a legal dispute and possible government intervention, the name was changed to Hunnu Air.

The airline purchased two Fokker 50 aircraft in 2011 and operated its first scheduled domestic flight (from Ulaanbaatar to Bayankhongor) on 2 January 2012. Other domestic routes were later opened from Ulaanbaatar to Mörön, Choibalsan, Khovd and Dalanzadgad. With the leasing of two Airbus A319 aircraft, delivered in January 2012, it was able to launch services to Tokyo and subsequently Bangkok, Shanghai and Hong Kong. In July 2013 a third Fokker 50 was acquired. Hunnu Air also operated charter flights to destinations such as Jeju, Hainan and Shizuoka.

Hunnu Air introduced its first long-haul direct flight from Ulaanbaatar to Paris for the summer period of 2014, with one technical stop, using an Airbus A319. The airline planned to acquire an Airbus A330 aircraft and relaunch long-haul direct flights in 2015 to include Singapore, but this never materialized due to a financial crisis. The two Airbus A319s were repossessed by their owner in late 2014.

In 2019 and 2023, Hunnu Air acquired two Embraer 190 aircraft.

In 2025, it was announced that two Embraer 195-E2 will be added to the fleet from April 2025.

== Destinations ==
As of July 2025, Hunnu Air serves the following scheduled and charter destinations.

Country	City	Airport	Notes	Refs
China	Beijing	Beijing Daxing International Airport		
China	Changsha	Changsha Huanghua International Airport	Terminated	
China	Erenhot (Erlian)	Erenhot Saiwusu International Airport		
China	Haikou	Haikou Meilan International Airport	Terminated	
China	Harbin	Harbin Taiping International Airport	Seasonal Charter	
China	Manzhouli	Manzhouli Xijiao Airport		
China	Shenzhen	Shenzhen Bao'an International Airport	Begins 22 October 2026	
China	Tianjin	Tianjin Binhai International Airport	Terminated	
India	Delhi	Indira Gandhi International Airport		
Japan	Shizuoka	Shizuoka Airport	Seasonal Charter	
Kazakhstan	Almaty	Almaty International Airport		
Mongolia	Mörön	Mörön Airport	Terminated	
Mongolia	Ulaanbaatar	Chinggis Khaan International Airport	Hub	
Philippines	Manila	Ninoy Aquino International Airport	Seasonal Charter	
United Arab Emirates	Dubai	Dubai International Airport	Terminated	

=== Interline agreement ===
Hunnu Air has an interline agreement with MIAT Mongolian Airlines and Hahn Air.

== Fleet ==
=== Current fleet ===
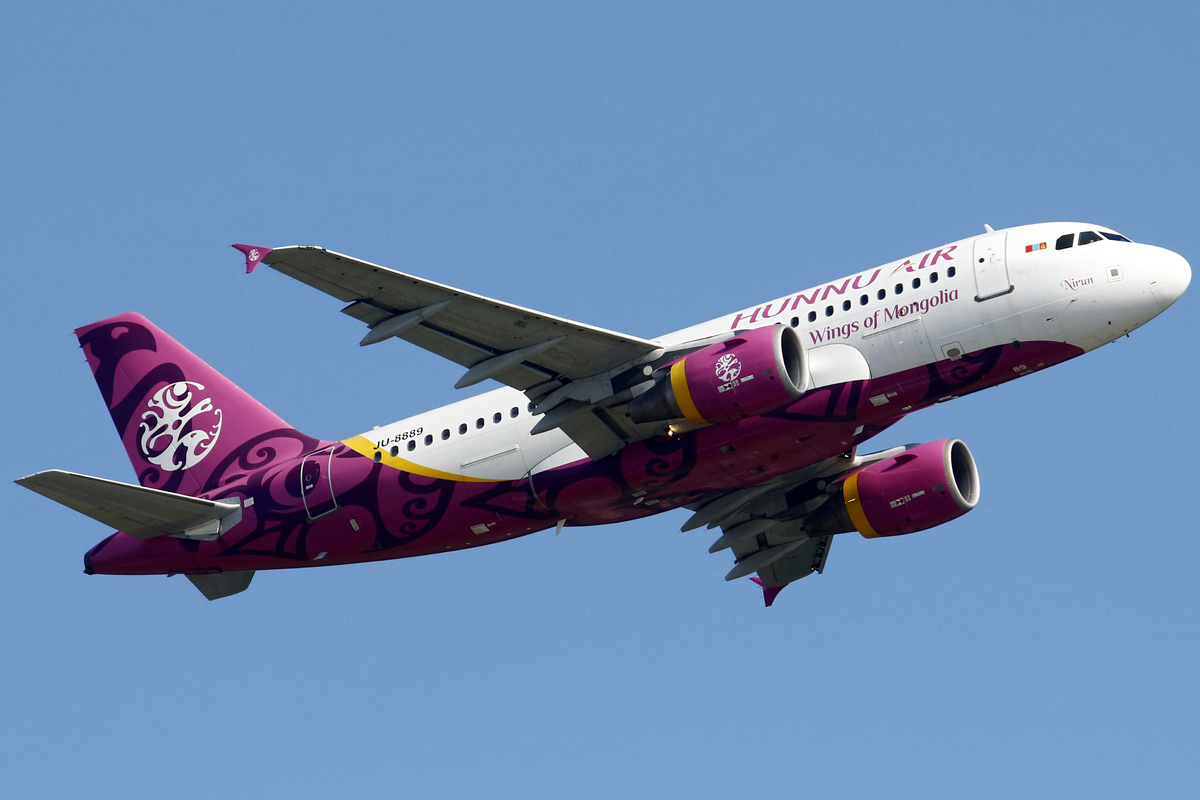
Hunnu Air (Airbus A319)

As of July 2025, the Hunnu Air fleet includes the following aircraft:

Hunnu Air fleet
Aircraft	In service	Orders	Passengers				Notes
Aircraft	In service	Orders	C	W	Y	Total	Notes
Beechcraft Super King Air 360	—	1	TBA				Deliveries begin in 2027.
Cessna 208B Grand Caravan	2	—	—	—	9	9	Delivery of second aircraft in 2026
Cessna 408 SkyCourier	—	2	—	—	19	19	Deliveries begin in 2026
Embraer 190	2	—	6	16	76	98	
Embraer 190	2	—	9	—	88	97	
Embraer 195-E2	2	—	—	16	120	136	
Total	6	3					
