= Mörön Airport =

Airport in Mörön, Khövsgöl, Mongolia

Mörön Airport Мөрөн Нисэх Буудал
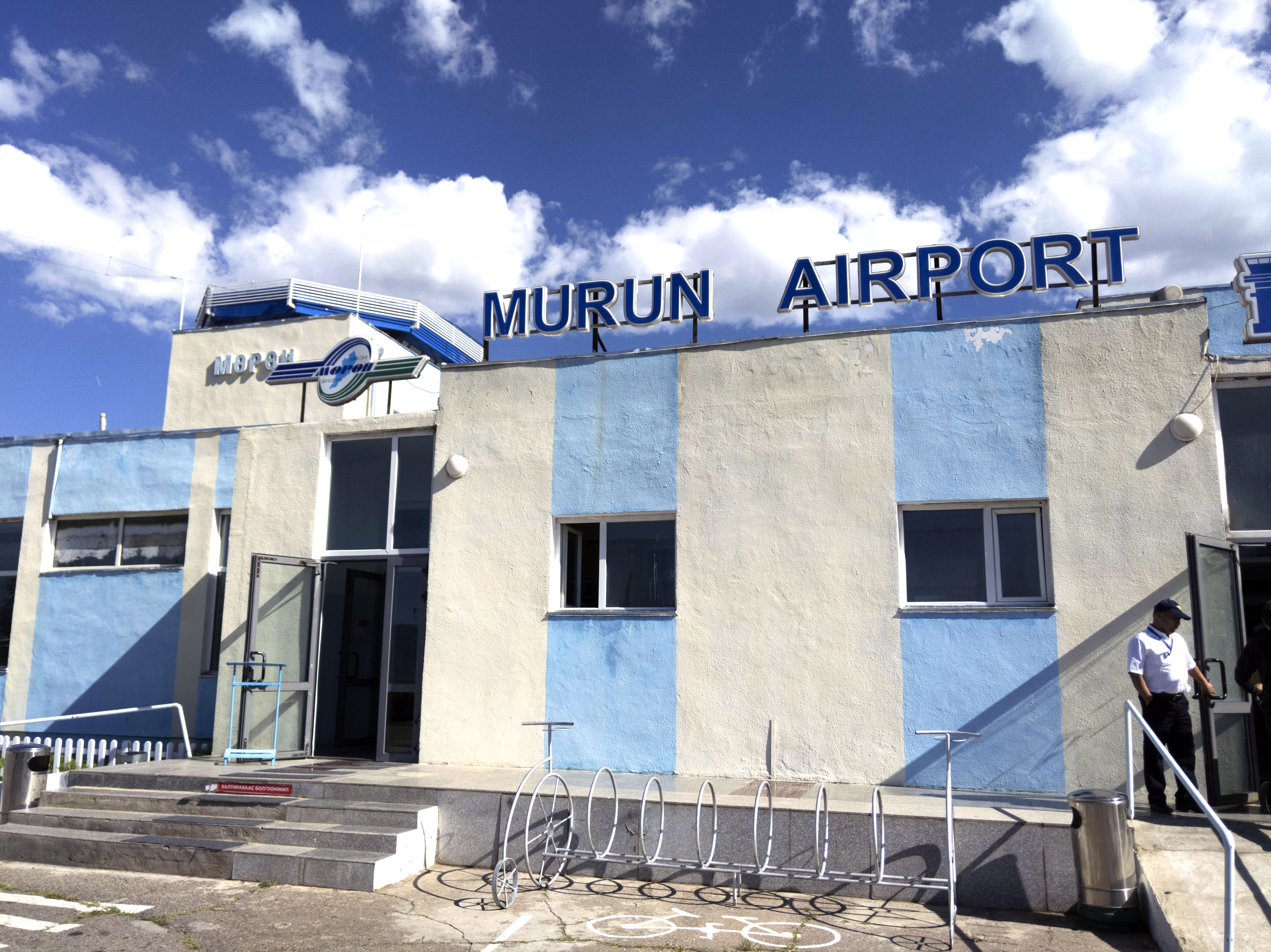
- Airport in 2022
- IATA: MXV; ICAO: ZMMN

Summary
- Airport type: Joint (civil and military)
- Owner: Civil Aviation Authority of Mongolia
- Operator: Mörön (city)
- Elevation AMSL: 4,272 ft (1,302 m)
- Coordinates: 49°39′47″N 100°05′57″E

Map
- Location of airport in Mongolia MXV (Asia) MXV (Earth)

Runways
Direction	Length		Surface
Direction	ft	m	Surface
10L/28R	8,005	2,440	Asphalt/concrete
10R/28L	6,561	2,000	Gravel

Statistics (2010 MXV)
- Passengers: 13,000
- Sources: Civil Aviation Administration of Mongolia

Mörön Airport (Mongolian: Мөрөн Нисэх Буудал), also known as Murun Airport (IATA: MXV, ICAO: ZMMN) is a public airport located in Mörön, the capital of Khövsgöl Province, Mongolia.

Formerly a domestic-only airport, it received its first international flight on July 29, 2025 from Cheongju International Airport in South Korea, which was operated by Hunnu Air.

== Airlines and destinations ==
Airlines	Destinations
Hunnu Air	Cheongju, Ulaanbaatar
MIAT Mongolian Airlines	Ulaanbaatar

== See also ==
- List of airports in Mongolia
- Gelenkhüü
