= MIAT Mongolian Airlines =

National airline of Mongolia

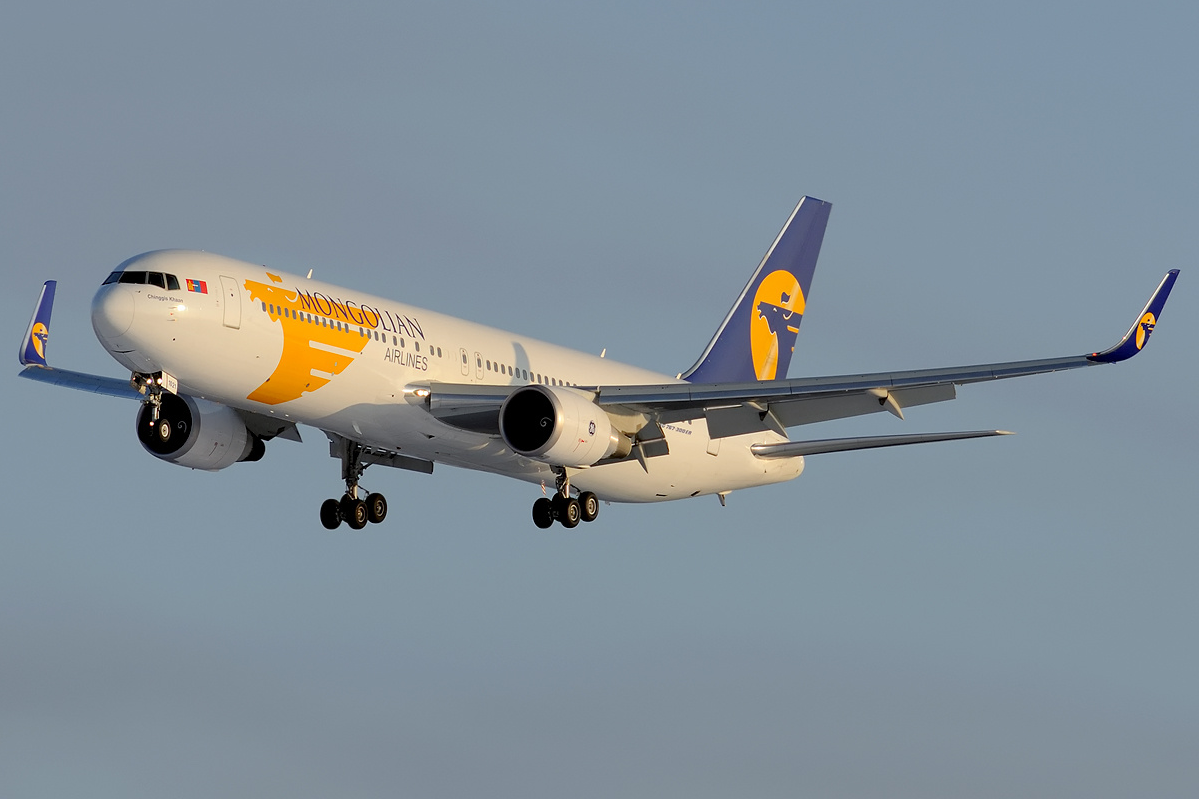
- MIAT Mongolian Airlines 767-300ER
IATA	ICAO	Call sign
OM	MGL	MONGOL AIR
- Founded: 1956; 70 years ago
- Commenced operations: 7 July 1956; 70 years ago
- Hubs: Chinggis Khaan International Airport
- Frequent-flyer program: Blue Sky Mongolia
- Fleet size: 10
- Destinations: 21
- Headquarters: Ulaanbaatar, Mongolia
- Key people: Munkhtamir Batbayar (CEO) & Chairman; Gantulga Baasanjav (COO); Tsegts Narangerel (CFO); Batdari Namhaijantsan (CCO); Munkhmaral Enkhbaatar (CAO)
- Employees: 1593
- Website: www.miat.com

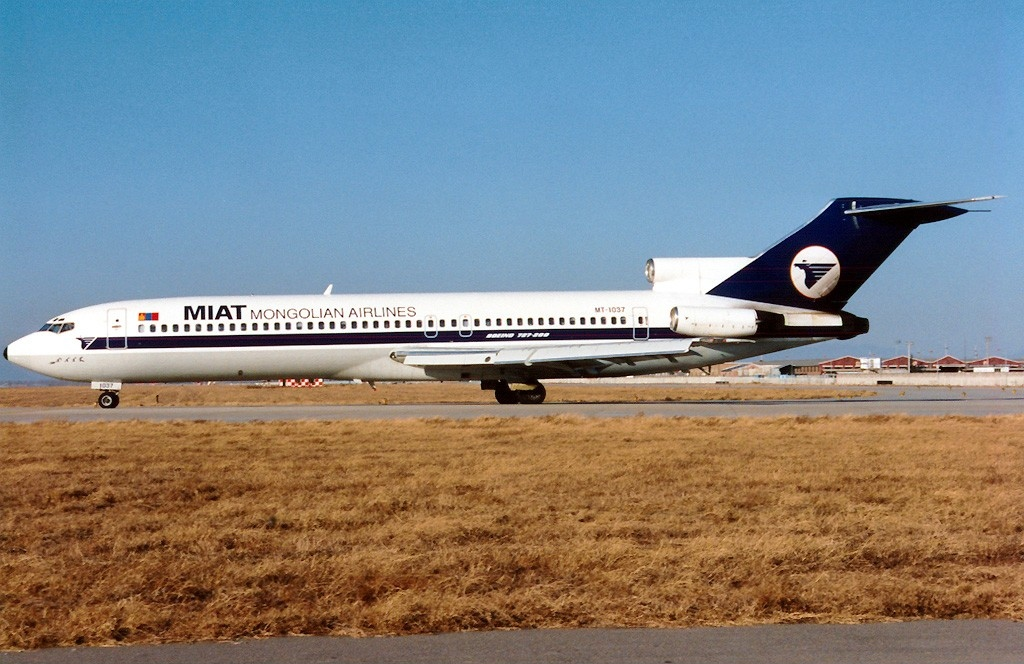
A Boeing 727-200 in 1995

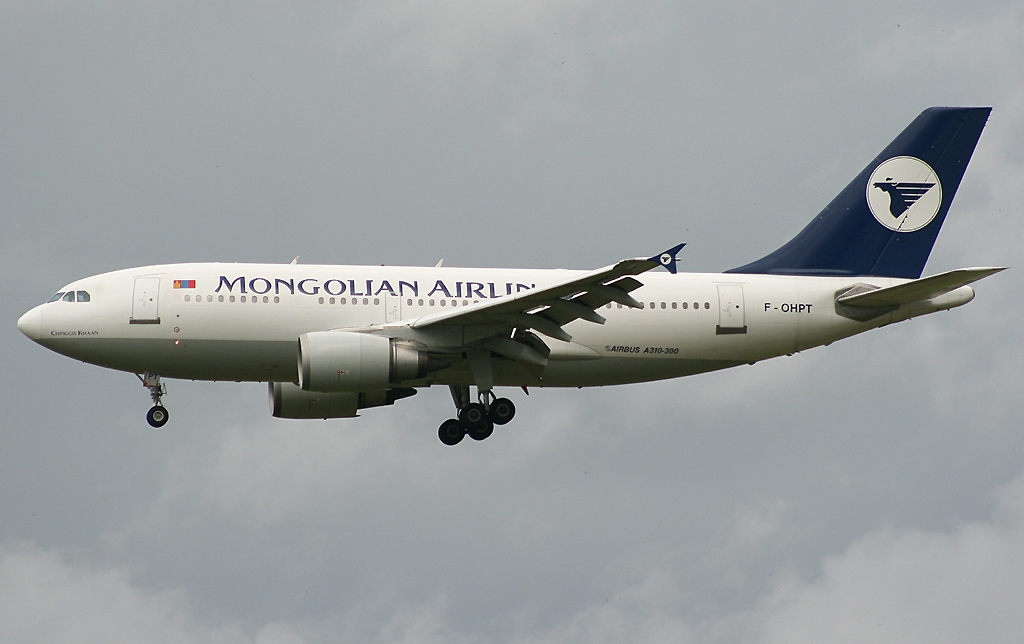
An Airbus A310-300 in 2007

MIAT Mongolian Airlines (Note: /ˈmiːæt/; Mongolian: Монголын Иргэний Агаарын Тээвэр (МИАТ), romanized: Mongoliin Irgenii Agaariin Teebher (MIAT), pronounced [mɔɴɢə̆ɮíːɴ irkɘ̆níː aʁáːriːɴ tʰéːwɘ̆r (mʲɛʰt)]; lit. 'Mongolian Civil Air Transport') is the state-owned flag carrier of Mongolia, headquartered in the MIAT Building in the country's capital of Ulaanbaatar. The airline operates scheduled services from its base at Chinggis Khaan International Airport in Sergelen, near Ulaanbaatar, and is the largest airline in Mongolia by fleet size and destination count. Originally commencing operations in 1956, MIAT exclusively used Soviet aircraft until Mongolia's transition to a market economy in the 1990s, now operating a mix of Boeing and Bombardier jets.

== History ==
=== Foundations ===
The start of aviation in Mongolia is attributed to 25 May 1925, when a Junkers F 13 given by the USSR to the Mongolian People's Republic landed in Ulaanbaatar. In 1946, the Civil Air Transport Department (Mongolian: Иргэний агаарын тээврийн тасаг) started operations with eight aircraft. It conducted direct flights from Ulaanbaatar to nearby provinces Selenge, Bulgan, Arkhangai, Övörkhangai, Khentii, Sükhbaatar, Dornod and performed limited charter and unscheduled airmail flights to the more isolated provinces.

=== Regular services ===
The first batch of Mongolian flight crew for Antonov An-2 operations were sent to Irkutsk for training in 1955, graduating the next year and paving the way for regular domestic services. Regular flights started on 7 July 1956 using an Antonov An-2 from Ulaanbaatar to Irkutsk. The Ilyushin Il-14 was introduced in 1957, and by 1958, MIAT had a fleet of 14 Antonov An-2 and seven Ilyushin Il-14 aircraft.

The first Antonov An-24 turboprop aircraft was received in 1964. An-26 twin turboprops were also obtained in the era.

By 1970, the airline was conducting services to 130 separate airfields in the country, with 4-6 flights a week from Ulaanbaatar to province centers (accounting for 70% of passengers), and 2-3 flights a week from province centers to sum centers.

In 1987, it started regular international operations to Moscow, Irkutsk, and Beijing (opening representative offices in the three cities) with its first jet aircraft, a Tupolev-154B on lease from Aeroflot, followed by a second modern Tupolev Tu-154M lease in 1990.

=== Post-communist era ===
In 1992, MIAT bought five Chinese Harbin Y-12 commuter aircraft for domestic flights. The same year, the president of the Hanjin Group (parent of Korean Air) gave a Boeing 727-200 to the airline, with two more acquired in subsequent years. These three aircraft were used until 2003. In 1993, MIAT was made into an independent state-owned enterprise.

International operations outside of the Soviet Union and China started in 1995 with regular flights to Seoul, followed by flights to Berlin and Osaka in 1996.

An Airbus A310 was leased in 1998, becoming MIAT's first Airbus plane.

The 1990s were a spotty era in MIAT's safety record, with four crashes of An-2, An-24, and Harbin Y-12 aircraft involving 139 fatalities. The last fatal crash was in 1998.

A Boeing 737 was leased in 2002 to replace the ageing 727-200 fleet, and the same year flights to Tokyo were introduced.

Between 2003 and 2008, MIAT's An-24 and An-26 fleet was gradually retired. In April 2008, MIAT received its second Boeing 737-800 aircraft on lease from CIT Aerospace. In July 2008, MIAT ended scheduled domestic flights completely, briefly resuming scheduled domestic flights to Mörön and Khovd in June 2009.

In late 2009, MIAT flew charter flights to Hong Kong and Sanya, a popular resort city in Hainan, China. In June 2010, the airline's flights were brought to a halt due to a mechanics' strike. However, the situation was resolved by replacing the CEO and Technical Director.

In early 2011, MIAT signed an agreement with Air Lease Corporation to lease two former China Eastern Airlines Boeing 767-300ERs until 2013. The first aircraft entered service in May 2011 with the second following in November 2011. In 2014, the Airbus A310 was retired after serving MIAT Mongolian Airlines for 16 years.

=== All-Boeing fleet ===
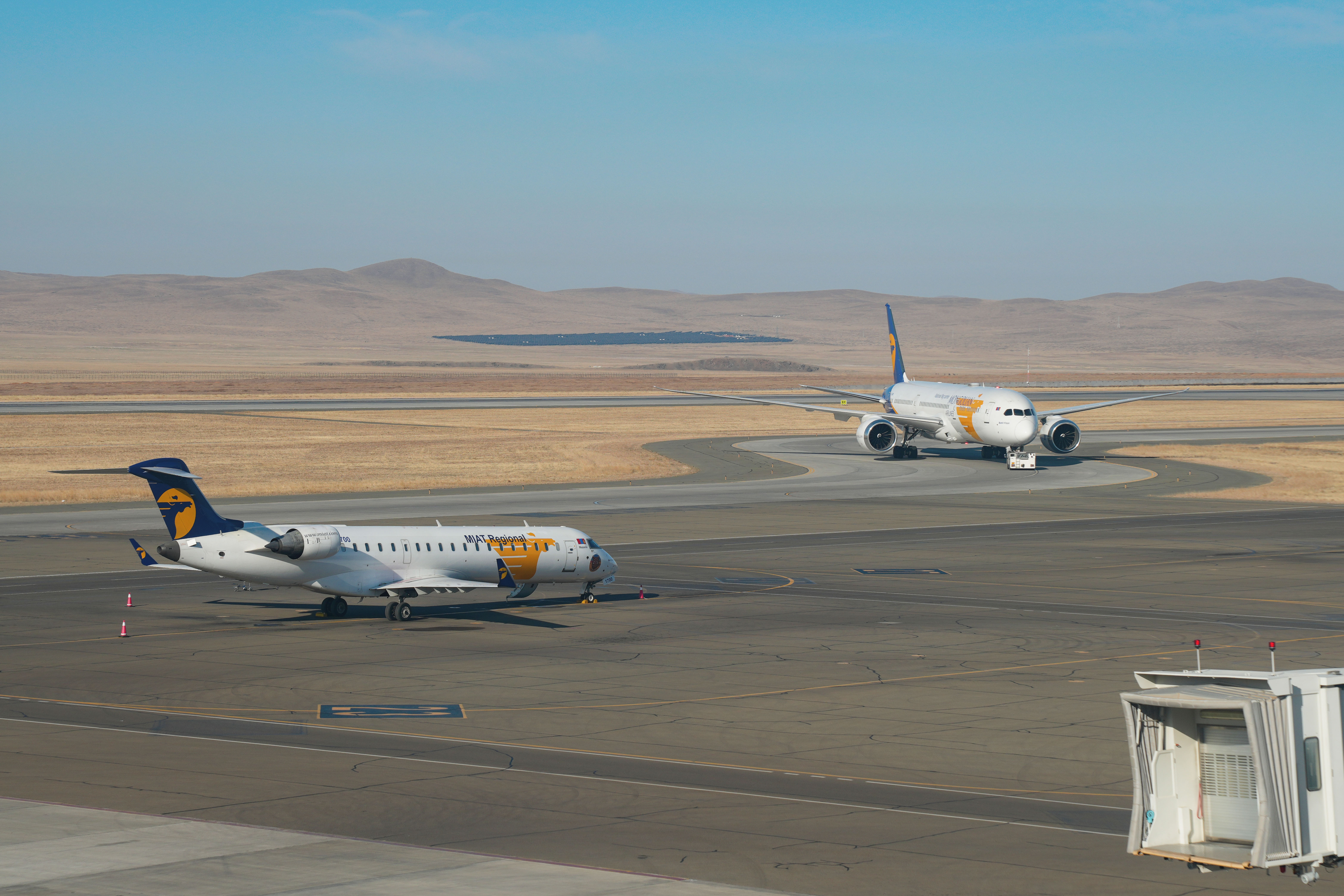
MIAT aircraft at Chinggis Khaan International Airport

In June 2011, MIAT began regular flights to Hong Kong. The company also ordered three aircraft, a Boeing 767-300ER and two Boeing 737-800s, to be delivered in 2013 and 2016, respectively. The order marks the first time in two decades that MIAT has chosen to expand its fleet by purchasing new aircraft straight from the manufacturer rather than leasing them.

In January 2019, MIAT announced flights to Shanghai and Guangzhou in China to start in the summer of 2019. In addition, it announced the leasing of three Boeing 737 Max aircraft to be delivered in January, May, and October 2019, thereby replacing two of its aircraft whose leases were due to expire in 2019, together with the implementation of a self-checking system.

In 2019, it was announced that MIAT had acquired a Boeing 787-9 on lease from Air Lease Corporation, to be delivered in 2021. This was disrupted due to the COVID-19 pandemic, resulting in a modified order of two Boeing 787-9s to be delivered starting in 2023, with flights being planned to Shanghai-Pudong, Ho Chi Minh, Singapore, and San Francisco.

=== Pandemic and post-pandemic ===
During the COVID-19 pandemic on 21 June 2020, MIAT performed the first non-stop flight (for repatriation and aid purposes) between Mongolia and North America in history with a Boeing 767-300ER flown between Ulaanbaatar and Seattle. It performed similar repatriation and charter services during the pandemic to Sydney and Johannesburg, flying to the continents of Australia and Africa for the first time.

In October 2022, MIAT became the first carrier to fly a Boeing 737 Max into China after the latter's flight regulator grounded all 737 Max aircraft in March 2019.

Starting June 2023, MIAT resumed its domestic operations, with flights to seven new destinations in Mongolia as well as restarting flights to Khovd and Mörön after 15 years. This was done in line with the government's program of '2023-2025 – The Years to Visit Mongolia' to promote and support tourism in Mongolia. As part of this change, MIAT wet-leased a Bombardier CRJ-200 and a Boeing 767-300ER to increase capacity.

In August 2023 and April 2024, MIAT announced the arrival of two Boeing 787s, to be used to fly routes to Frankfurt, Istanbul, and Seoul initially.

In April 2024, MIAT received its first Bombardier CRJ700 for use in domestic routes in "MIAT Regional" Branding, increasing its domestic capacity, followed by a second Bombardier CRJ700.

== Destinations ==
As of October 2023, MIAT Mongolian Airlines served the following destinations.

Country	City	Airport	Notes	Refs
China	Beijing	Beijing Capital International Airport		
China	Guangzhou	Guangzhou Baiyun International Airport		
China	Hohhot	Hohhot Baita International Airport		
China	Shanghai	Shanghai Pudong International Airport		
Germany	Frankfurt	Frankfurt Airport		
Hong Kong	Hong Kong	Hong Kong International Airport		
Japan	Osaka	Kansai International Airport	Seasonal	
Japan	Tokyo	Narita International Airport		
Mongolia	Altai	Altai Airport		
Mongolia	Bayankhongor	Bayankhongor Airport	Terminated	
Mongolia	Choibalsan	Choibalsan Airport	Terminated	
Mongolia	Dalanzadgad	Dalanzadgad Airport		
Mongolia	Khovd	Khovd Airport		
Mongolia	Mörön	Mörön Airport		
Mongolia	Ölgii	Ölgii Airport		
Mongolia	Ulaanbaatar	Buyant-Ukhaa International Airport	Airport closed	
Mongolia	Ulaanbaatar	Chinggis Khaan International Airport	Hub	
Mongolia	Ulaangom	Ulaangom Airport		
Mongolia	Uliastai	Donoi Airport		
Singapore	Singapore	Changi Airport		
South Korea	Busan	Gimhae International Airport		
South Korea	Seoul	Incheon International Airport		
Thailand	Bangkok	Suvarnabhumi Airport		
Thailand	Phuket	Phuket International Airport	Seasonal	
Turkey	Istanbul	Istanbul Airport		
Vietnam	Ho Chi Minh City	Tan Son Nhat International Airport	Seasonal	

MIAT Mongolian Airlines plans to transform Mongolia into a major air transit hub, leveraging its strategic geographical location between Europe and Asia. The airline aims to increase its transit passenger numbers significantly, targeting 24,000 passengers in 2024 and projects a revenue boost of 1 trillion MNT ($333 million). This initiative involves significant infrastructure upgrades at Chinggis Khaan International Airport, enhanced marketing strategies, and forming strategic partnerships to offer competitive pricing and high service standards, positioning Mongolia as a viable alternative to established transit hubs.

=== Codeshare agreements ===
MIAT Mongolian Airlines has codeshare agreements with the following airlines:

- Air China
- Cathay Pacific
- Japan Airlines
- Korean Air
- Turkish Airlines

=== Interline agreements ===
MIAT Mongolian Airlines has interline agreements with the following airlines:

- Air Astana
- Air France
- All Nippon Airways
- KLM
- Malaysia Airlines
- Singapore Airlines

== Fleet ==
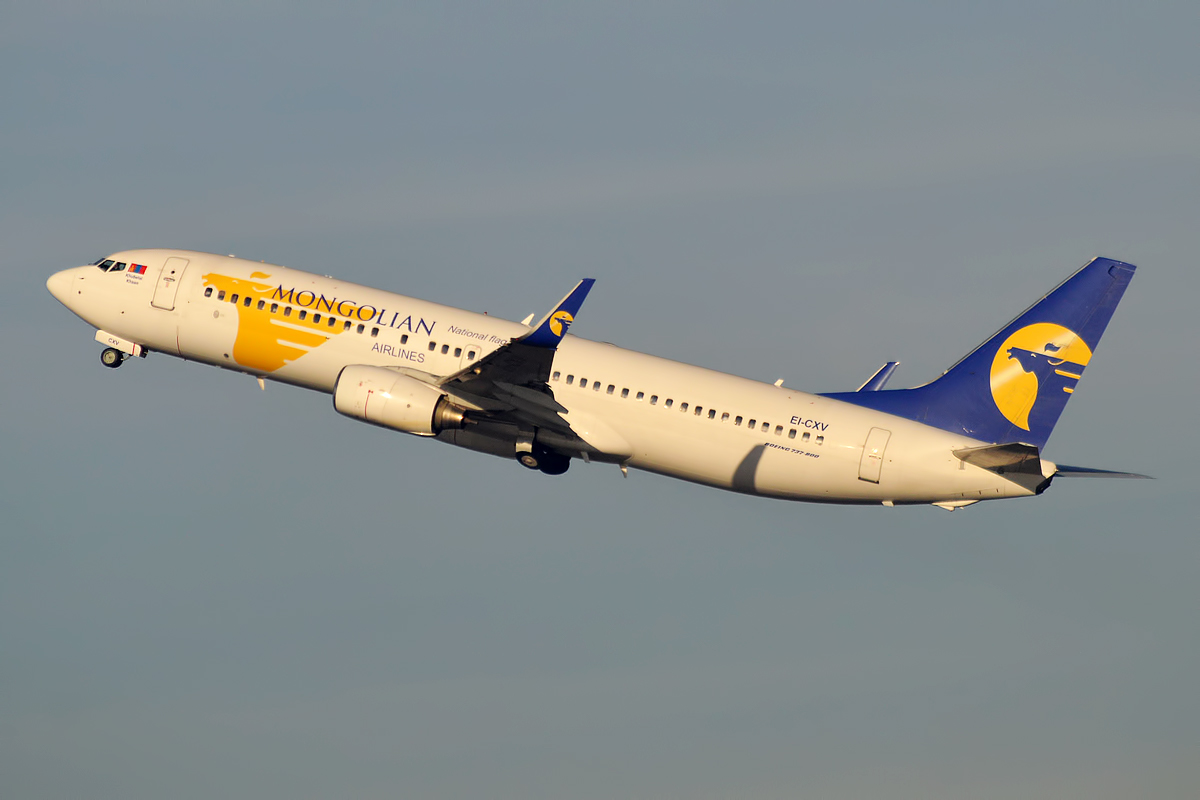
Boeing 737-800

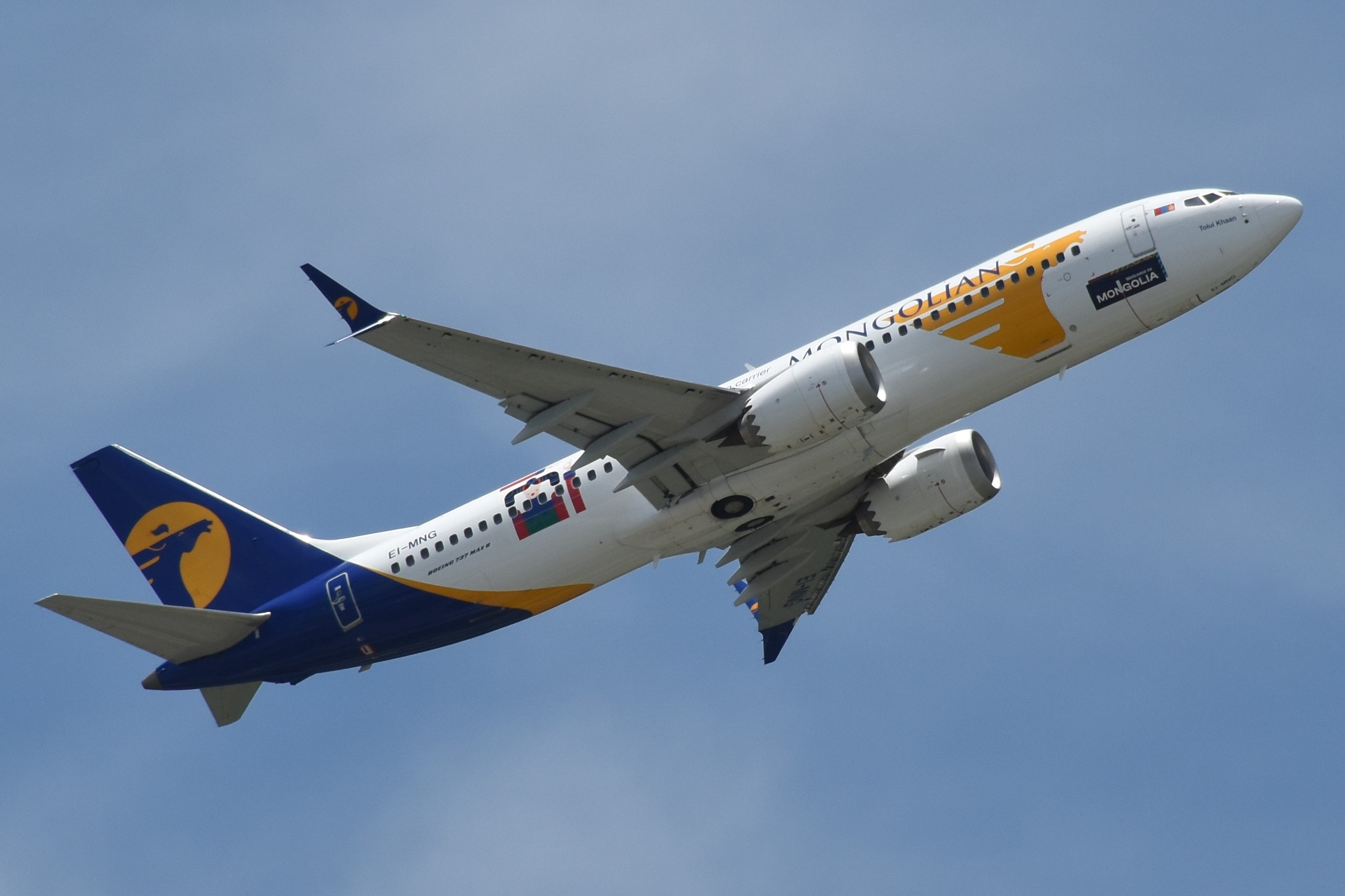
Boeing 737 MAX 8

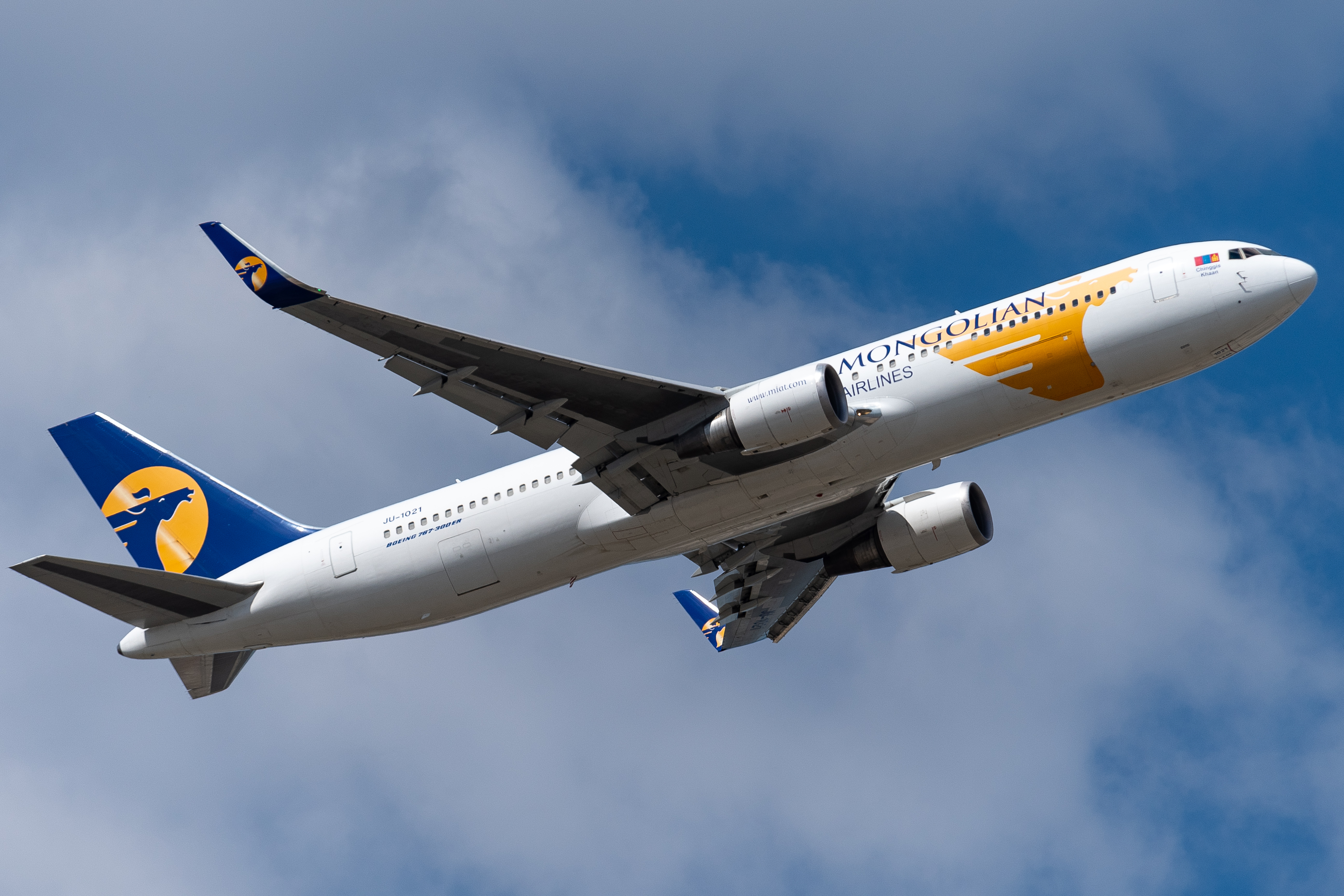
Boeing 767-300ER

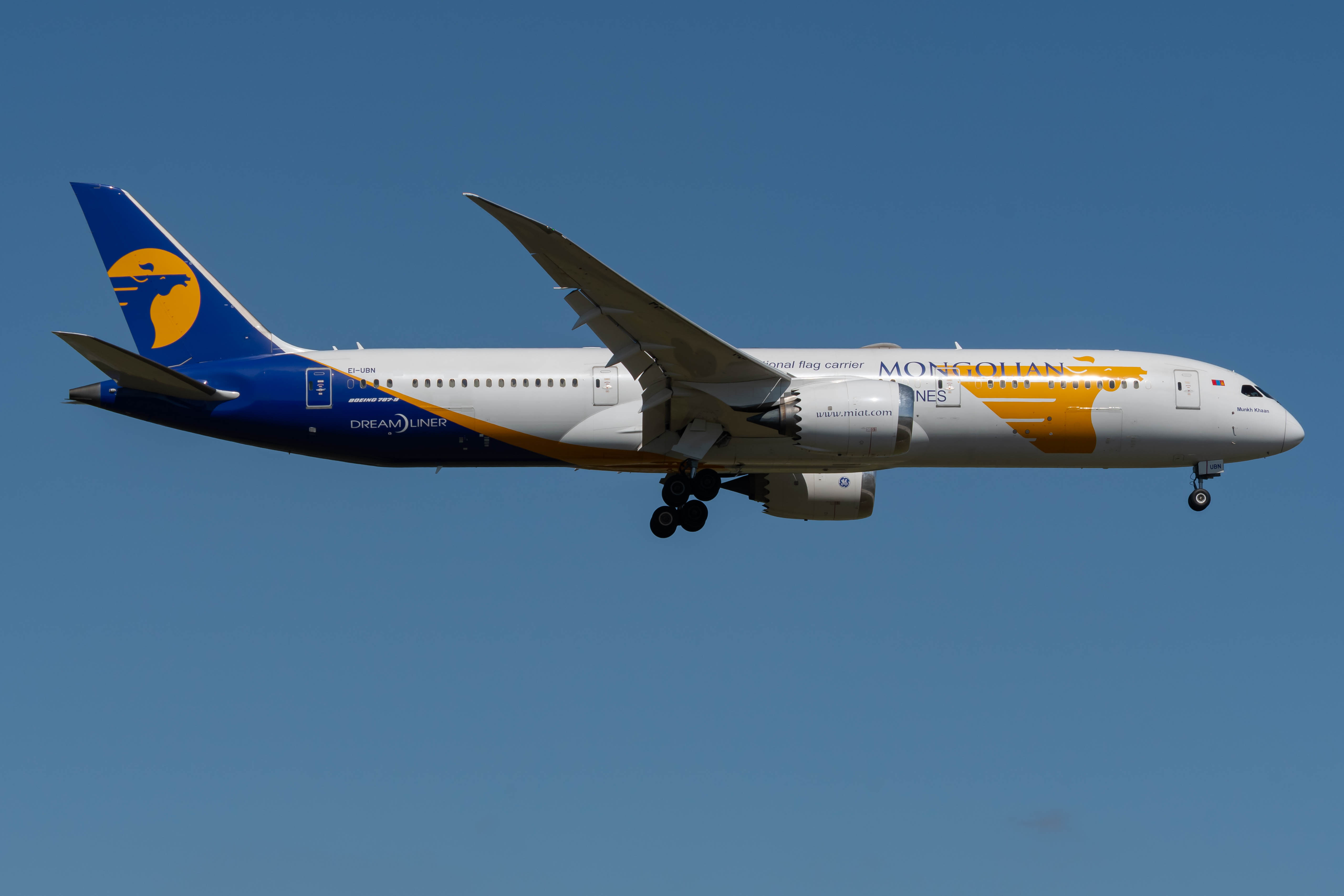
Boeing 787-9

=== Current fleet ===
As of December 2025, MIAT Mongolian Airlines operates the following aircraft:

MIAT Mongolian Airlines fleet
Aircraft	In service	Orders	Passengers				Notes
Aircraft	In service	Orders	J	W	Y	Total	Notes
Boeing 737-800	3	—	12	—	150	162	
Boeing 737-800	3	—	12	—	156	168	
Boeing 737-800	3	—	12	—	162	174	
Boeing 737 MAX 8	1	3	12	—	150	162	2 leased from Avalon and 2 leased from Air Lease Corporation.
Boeing 767-300ER	1	—	15	—	237	252	Soon to be retired.
Boeing 787-9	2	—	30	36	226	292	1 Leased to Air Congo
Bombardier CRJ700	2	—	—	—	70	70	
MIAT Mongolian Airlines Cargo fleet
Boeing 757-200PCF	1	—	Cargo				
Total	10	3					

=== Former fleet ===
MIAT has previously operated a variety of aircraft types, including:

- Boeing 737-700

== Accidents and incidents ==
MIAT Mongolian Airlines has suffered the following incidents and accidents since commencing operations:

- 4 August 1963: Avia 14 Super MONGOL-105 struck the side of Otgontenger mountain, killing at least two. According to a Mongolian journalist, the aircraft had departed Buyant-Ukhaa International Airport for Uvs and Hovd with more than 40 on board. In 2005, the wreckage, which was still in good condition, was removed from the mountain and dragged and slid into a nearby canyon.
- 17 September 1973: Antonov An-24B BNMAU-4206 struck the side of a mountain in Khovd Province during descent.
- 1 May 1979: Antonov An-24B BNMAU-1202 ran off the runway on landing at Erdenet Airport.
- 31 October 1981: PZL-Mielec An-2R MONGOL-613 crashed in Sükhbaatar Province.
- 25 June 1983: Antonov An-24RV BNMAU-8401 landed hard at Buyant-Ukhaa International Airport after the engines failed on final approach, collapsing the landing gear; all 47 on board survived.
- April 1985: Antonov An-24RV BNMAU-10207 reportedly crashed on approach to an airport in Khövsgöl Province; the wreck was reportedly seen at Buyant-Ukhaa International Airport in 1994 and again in 1995.
- April 1985: Antonov An-24RV BNMAU-10210 force-landed in Khövsgöl Province after both engines shut down following a loss of altitude due to icing; all 29 on board survived.
- 23 January 1987: Antonov An-24RV BNMAU-7710 crashed on landing at Buyant-Ukhaa International Airport; there were no casualties.
- 26 January 1990: Antonov An-24RV BNMAU-10208 force-landed near Ulaangom Airport after the pilot failed to locate the airport at night; all 41 on board survived.
- 5 December 1992: Harbin Y-12-II D-0066 crashed on takeoff from Choibalsan Airport.
- 23 April 1993: Antonov An-26 BNMAU-14102 struck the side of Marz Mountain during the descent into Ölgii Airport en route from Ulaanbaatar after the crew began descending too soon, killing all 32 on board; the wreckage was found on 7 May 1993.
- 21 September 1995: Flight 557, an Antonov An-24RV (BNMAU-10103) struck a mountain near Choho Geologoh Uul during approach to Mörön Airport en route from Ulaanbaatar after the crew descended too soon; of the 43 on board, only a passenger survived. The accident remains the deadliest in Mongolia.
- 10 June 1997: Flight 447, a Harbin Y-12-II (JU-1020), lost control and crashed after encountering wind shear while on final approach to Mandalgovi Airport, killing seven of 12 on board.
- 26 May 1998: Harbin Y-12-II JU-1017 crashed into a mountain near Erdenet due to pilot error, killing all 28 passengers and crew on board.
- 14 January 2001: Mil Mi-8T JU-1025 spun into the ground from 165 ft (50 m) and exploded near Hangai Um, Malchin district (600 mi (970 km) west of Ulaanbaatar), killing nine of 23 on board. The helicopter was operating for the United Nations.

== See also ==
- Transport in Mongolia
