= Bayan-Ovoo =

Bayan-Ovoo (Mongolian: Баян Овоо, 'rich shrine') may refer to:

== Mongolia ==
- Bayan-Ovoo, Bayankhongor, a sum (district) in Bayankhongor Province
- Bayan-Ovoo, Khentii, a sum (district) in Khentii Province
- Bayan-Ovoo, Ömnögovi, a sum (district) in Ömnögovi Province

== China ==
- Bayan Obo, Darhan Muminggan, a sum in Darhan Muminggan United Banner, Baotou, Inner Mongolia
- Bayan Obo, Dorbod, a sum in Dorbod Banner, Ulanqab, Inner Mongolia
- Bayan Obo Mining District, a district in Baotou, Inner Mongolia
  - Bayan Obo mine, a deposit in Baotou, Inner Mongolia
- Bayan Ovoo, Hoboksar , a Township in Hoboksar, Tacheng, Xinjiang
