= Ulaan Lake =

Lake in Ömnögovi Province, Mongolia

- Улаан нуур (Mongolian)
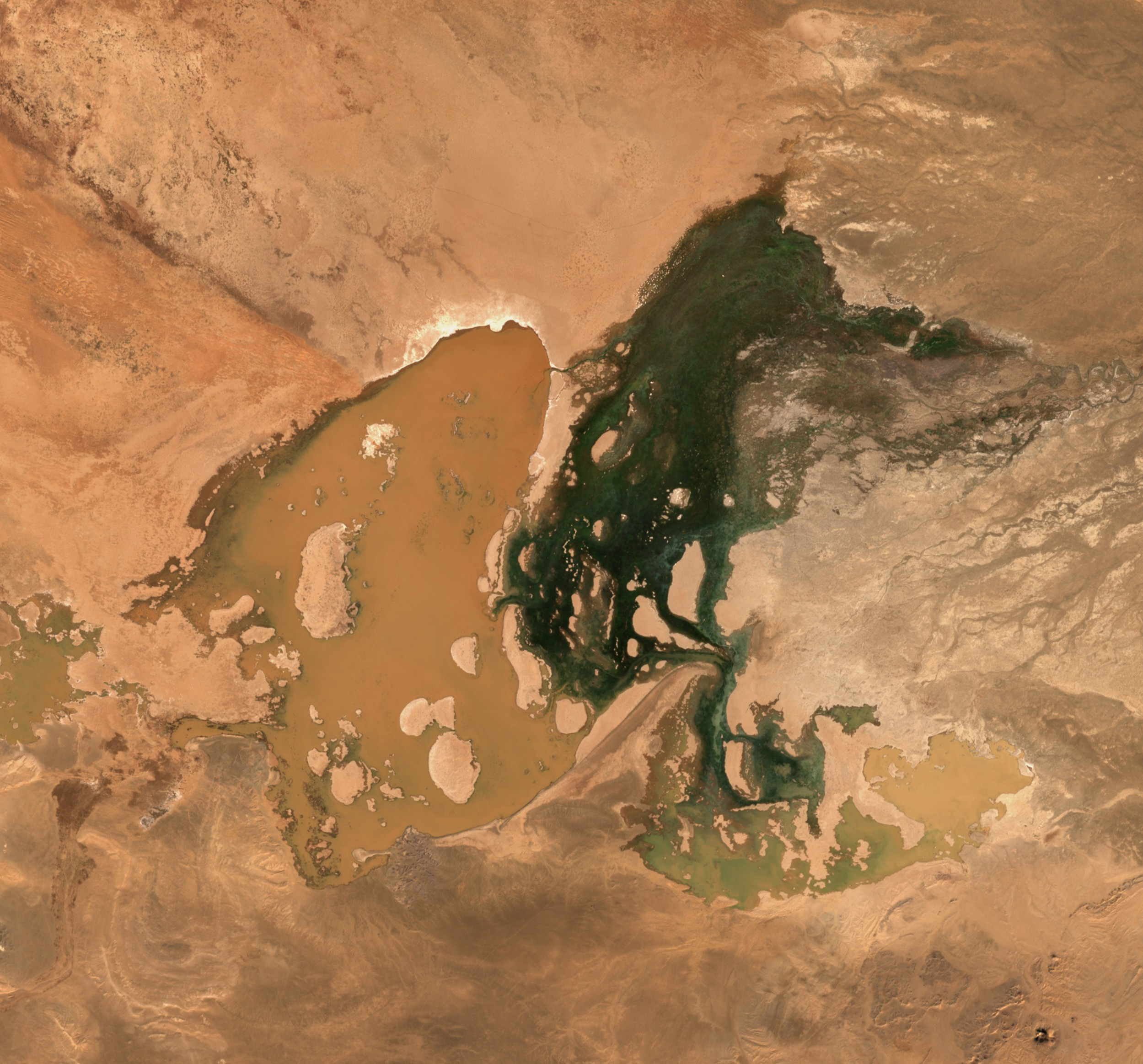

- Location within Mongolia
- Location: Ömnögovi Province
- Coordinates: 44°30′54″N 106°36′58″E
- Basin countries: Mongolia
- Surface area: 175 km^{2} (68 sq mi)
- Surface elevation: 1,008 m (3,307 ft)

Ulaan Lake (Mongolian: Улаан нуур, ᠤᠯᠠᠭᠠᠨ ᠨᠠᠭᠤᠷ) was a lake in the districts of Mandal-Ovoo and Bulgan, in Ömnögovi Province, Mongolia. It completely dried up in 1995.
