= Bayan-Ovoo, Ömnögovi =

District in Ömnögovi Province, Mongolia

Bayan-Ovoo District Баян-Овоо сум ᠪᠠᠶ᠋ᠠᠨᠣᠪᠤᠭ᠎ᠠᠰᠤᠮᠤ
- District
- Location in Mongolia
- Coordinates: 42°58′13″N 106°07′06″E
- Country: Mongolia
- Province: Ömnögovi Province

Area
  - Total: 11,300 km^{2} (4,400 sq mi)

Population (2008)
  - Total: 1,500
- Time zone: UTC+8 (UTC + 8)

Bayan-Ovoo (Mongolian: Баян-Овоо, Rich ovoo) is a sum (district) of Ömnögovi Province in the Gobi Desert of southern Mongolia. The seat lies at Erdenetsogt.

== History ==
The sum was established on May 26, 1924.

== Geography and climate ==
The sum is located in the Gobi Desert of southern Mongolia, 170 kilometres (110 mi) by road southwest of the provincial capital of Dalanzadgad, at an elevation ranging from 2200 to 2700 metres above sea level. It borders China to the south and the sums of Nomgon, Khankhongor, Tsogttsetsii, Manlai and Khanbogd in the northeast. The highest point of the district is Yamaat Uul (1926 m). The Ikh and Baga Khachi mountains are located in the north and Tsagaan Del mountain is in the south.

The climate is generally warm, with little snow in the winter, and it is rare for it to rain during the summer months, with only 63.2-70.9 mm of precipitation falling annually. Dust storms are common in the spring.

== Administrative divisions ==
The district is divided into three bags, which are:

- Kharzag
- Mogoit
- Nalikh

== Plants and animals ==
Ecologically, the district is in a transition zone, with the north of the district in the Eastern Gobi desert-steppe ecoregion, and the south in the Alashan Plateau semi-desert ecoregion. Although technically in a cold desert climate, the district has sufficient precipitation to support sparse plant life, particularly xerophytes (species adapted to low moisture levels) in low-lying areas.

Over 40 species of medicinal plants are found in the district. Shrubs found include red thorn, goat thistle, golden thistle, and alfalfa. There are 22 species of rodents, 14 species of mammals, including two types of Mongolian gazelle, two species of insectivores and three species of amphibians found in Bayan-Ovoo. Birds found include sparrow, eagle, partridge, hawk, owl, raven, and falcon.

== Economy and services ==
The economy is mainly based around livestock. There are reserves of silver, gold and copper in the sum, with silver deposits at Bolgon, gold at Alag Tolgoi and copper at Yamaat. Shale and coal found here are used for fuel. There is a secondary school with 280 students in the seat of the district, a kindergarten with 50 children, a 15-bed hospital and the Association of Meteorology.
