= Tsogt-Ovoo, Ömnögovi =

District in Ömnögovi Province, Mongolia

Tsogt-Ovoo District Цогт-Овоо сум ᠴᠣᠭᠲᠤᠣᠪᠤᠭ᠎ᠠᠰᠤᠮᠤ
- District
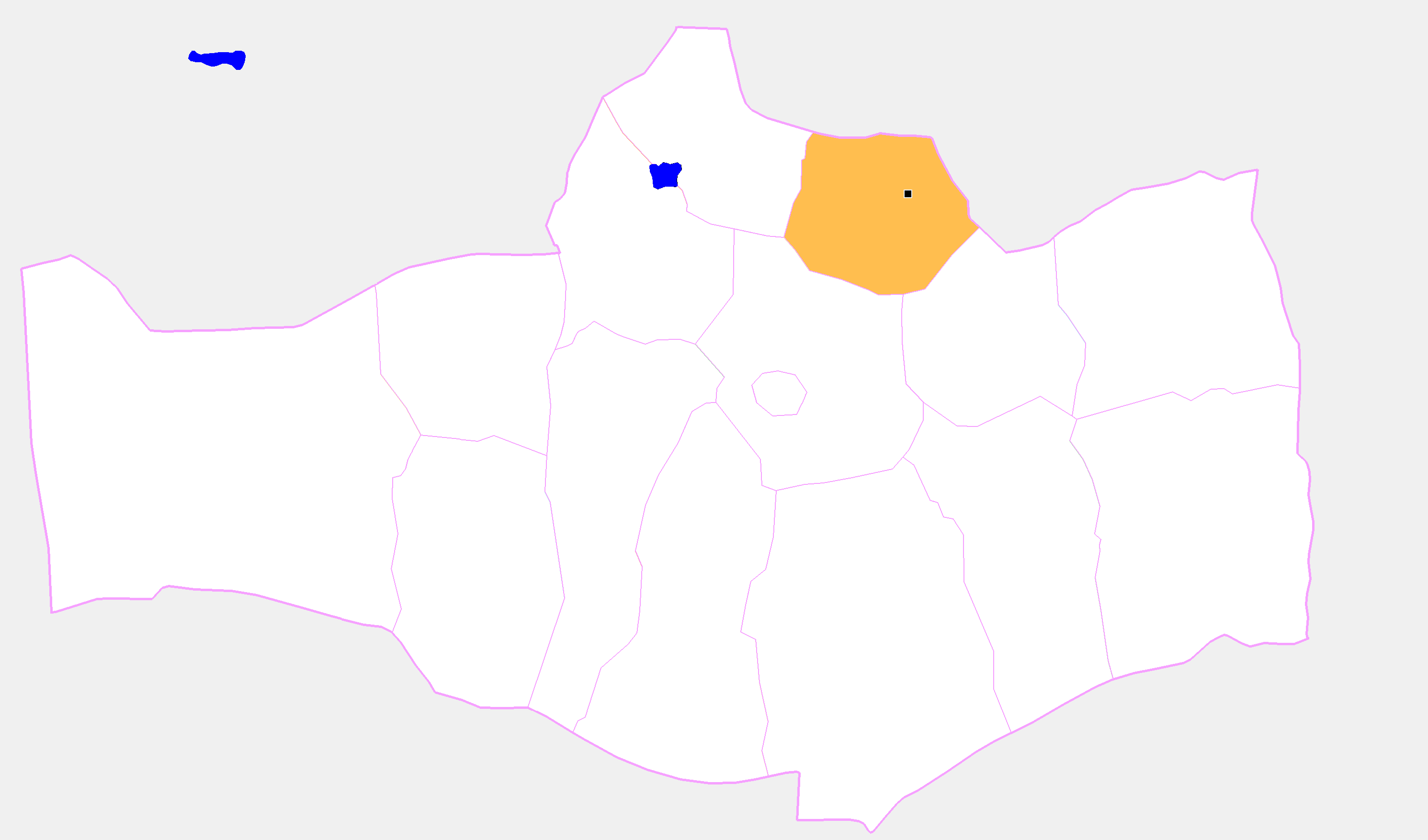
- Tsogt-Ovoo District in Ömnögovi Province

- Location within Mongolia
- Coordinates: 44°25′21″N 105°19′17″E
- Country: Mongolia
- Province: Ömnögovi Province

Area
  - Total: 6,526 km^{2} (2,520 sq mi)
- Time zone: UTC+8 (UTC + 8)

Tsogt-Ovoo (Mongolian: Цогт-Овоо, mighty Ovoo) is a sum (district) of Ömnögovi Province in southern Mongolia. As of 2009 the population of the sum was 1,666, including 619 in the sum center. The area of the sum is 6,526 square kilometres (2,520 sq mi) and its population density is 0.26 people/km^{2}.

== Climate ==
Tsogt-Ovoo has a cold desert climate (Köppen climate classification BWk) with very warm summers and very cold winters. Most precipitation falls in the summer as rain. Winters are very dry.

Climate data for Tsogt-Ovoo, elevation 1,298 m (4,259 ft), (1991–2020 normals, extremes 1962–1990)
Month	Jan	Feb	Mar	Apr	May	Jun	Jul	Aug	Sep	Oct	Nov	Dec	Year
Record high °C (°F)	6.9 (44.4)	13.4 (56.1)	19.8 (67.6)	28.4 (83.1)	34.0 (93.2)	35.8 (96.4)	38.6 (101.5)	39.5 (103.1)	31.8 (89.2)	25.4 (77.7)	17.1 (62.8)	7.6 (45.7)	39.5 (103.1)
Mean daily maximum °C (°F)	−9.2 (15.4)	−3.4 (25.9)	5.4 (41.7)	15.2 (59.4)	21.8 (71.2)	27.5 (81.5)	30.2 (86.4)	27.8 (82.0)	21.7 (71.1)	12.3 (54.1)	1.3 (34.3)	−7.2 (19.0)	12.0 (53.5)
Daily mean °C (°F)	−15.7 (3.7)	−11.1 (12.0)	−2.0 (28.4)	7.6 (45.7)	14.4 (57.9)	20.7 (69.3)	23.6 (74.5)	21.3 (70.3)	14.8 (58.6)	5.2 (41.4)	−5.5 (22.1)	−13.4 (7.9)	5.0 (41.0)
Mean daily minimum °C (°F)	−21.2 (−6.2)	−17.1 (1.2)	−8.9 (16.0)	0.5 (32.9)	7.0 (44.6)	13.7 (56.7)	17.2 (63.0)	15.2 (59.4)	8.2 (46.8)	−1.2 (29.8)	−11.0 (12.2)	−18.8 (−1.8)	−1.4 (29.6)
Record low °C (°F)	−37 (−35)	−35.5 (−31.9)	−28.7 (−19.7)	−17.7 (0.1)	−7.1 (19.2)	0.1 (32.2)	5.0 (41.0)	−0.2 (31.6)	−8.6 (16.5)	−16.7 (1.9)	−28.3 (−18.9)	−34.8 (−30.6)	−37 (−35)
Average precipitation mm (inches)	0.9 (0.04)	1.5 (0.06)	1.9 (0.07)	1.7 (0.07)	9.3 (0.37)	15.0 (0.59)	27.9 (1.10)	21.9 (0.86)	12.3 (0.48)	4.0 (0.16)	1.4 (0.06)	1.1 (0.04)	98.9 (3.9)
Average precipitation days (≥ 1.0 mm)	0.3	0.3	0.6	0.3	2.1	3.2	4.4	4.0	2.0	1.2	0.4	0.3	19.1
Source 1: NOAA
Source 2: Starlings Roost Weather

== Administrative divisions ==
The district is divided into three bags, which are:

- Borteeg
- Naiz
- Zamiin Shand
