= Baruun Naran Coal Mine =

Coal mine in Khan khongor, Ömnögovi, Mongolia

- Location within Mongolia
- Location: Khan khongor, Ömnögovi, Mongolia; 43°35′46.4″N 105°13′26.0″E
- Products: coal
- Production: 500,000 tons (2013)
- Opened: 2012

The Baruun Naran Coal Mine is a coal mine in Khan khongor, Ömnögovi Province, Mongolia.

== History ==
The mine was commissioned in January 2012. In February 2012, the mining operation started.

== Geology ==
The mine covers an area of 45 km^{2}.

== Business ==
The mine produced 500,000 tons of coal in 2013.

== See also ==
- Mining in Mongolia
