= Dulamyn Puntsag =

Judge of the Supreme Court of Mongolia

- Дуламын Пунцаг

Judge of the Supreme Court of Mongolia
- In office 1999–2012

Chief Judge of the Orkhon Province
- In office 1994–1999

Chief Judge of the Darkhan-Uul Province
- In office 1981–1994

Chief Judge of the Sükhbaatar (district), Ulaanbaatar
- In office 1978–1981

Chief Judge of the Dornogovi Province
- In office 1975–1977

Personal details
- Born: Ноён, Өмнөговь аймаг, Монгол Улс
- Education: Хууль Зүйн Сургууль, Монгол Улсын Их Сургууль

Dulamyn Puntsag (Mongolian: Дуламын Пунцаг) is a former judge of the Supreme Court of Mongolia.
