= Sevrei, Ömnögovi =

District in Ömnögovi Province, Mongolia

Coordinates: 43°35′14″N 102°11′06″E

Sevrei District Сэврэй сум ᠰᠡᠪᠡᠷᠡᠢᠰᠤᠮᠤ
- District
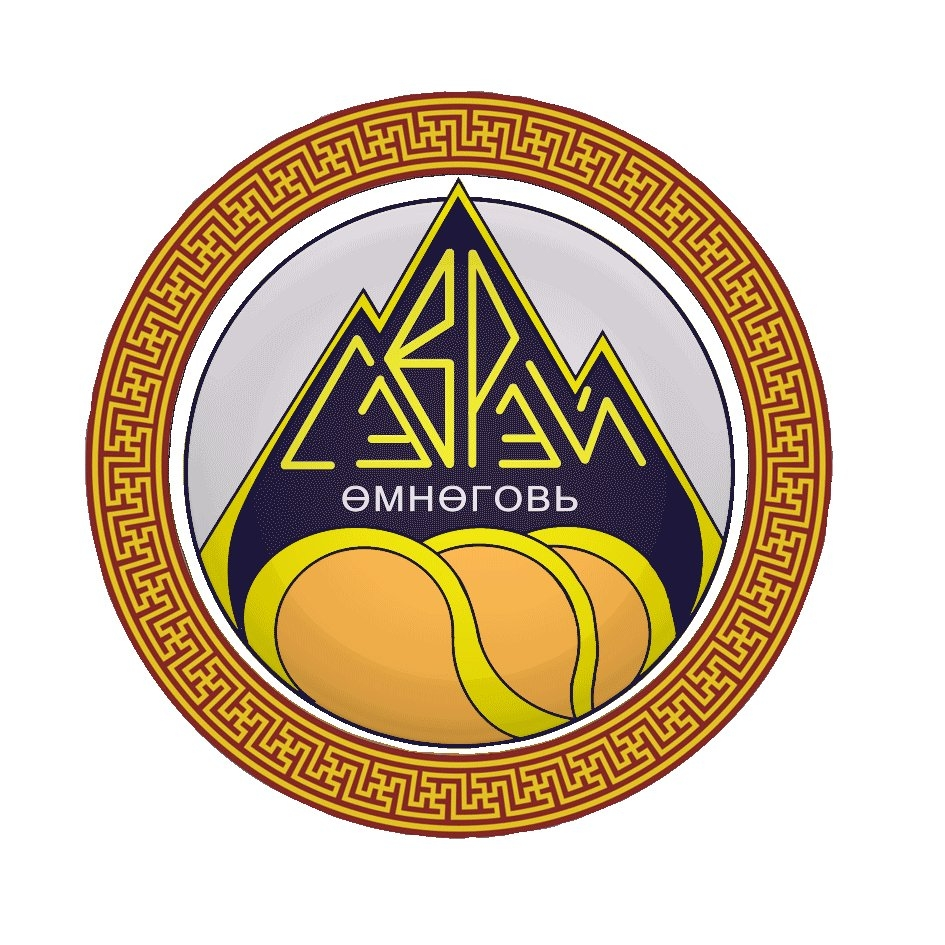
- Seal

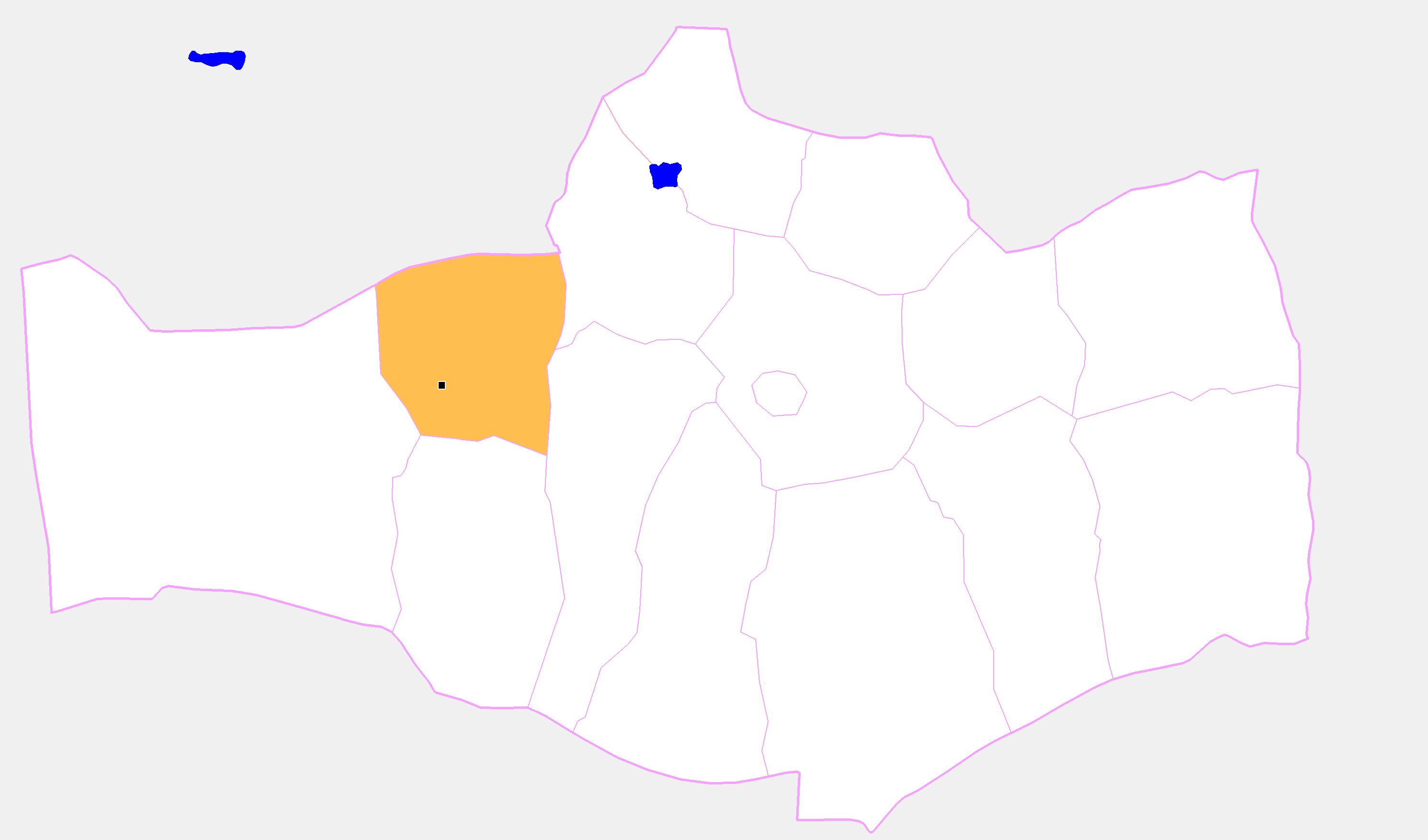
- Sevrei District in Ömnögovi Province
- Country: Mongolia
- Province: Ömnögovi Province

Area
  - Total: 8,095 km^{2} (3,125 sq mi)
- Time zone: UTC+8 (UTC + 8)

Sevrei (Mongolian: Сэврэй "fresh wind") is a sum (district) of Ömnögovi Province in southern Mongolia. In 2009, its population was 2,191.

== Administrative divisions ==
The district is divided into three bags, which are:

- Builsen
- Khoolt
- Sainshand
