= Noyon, Ömnögovi =

District in Ömnögovi Province, Mongolia

Coordinates: 43°08′54″N 102°07′38″E

Noyon District Ноён сум ᠨᠣᠶᠠᠨ ᠰᠤᠮᠤ
- District
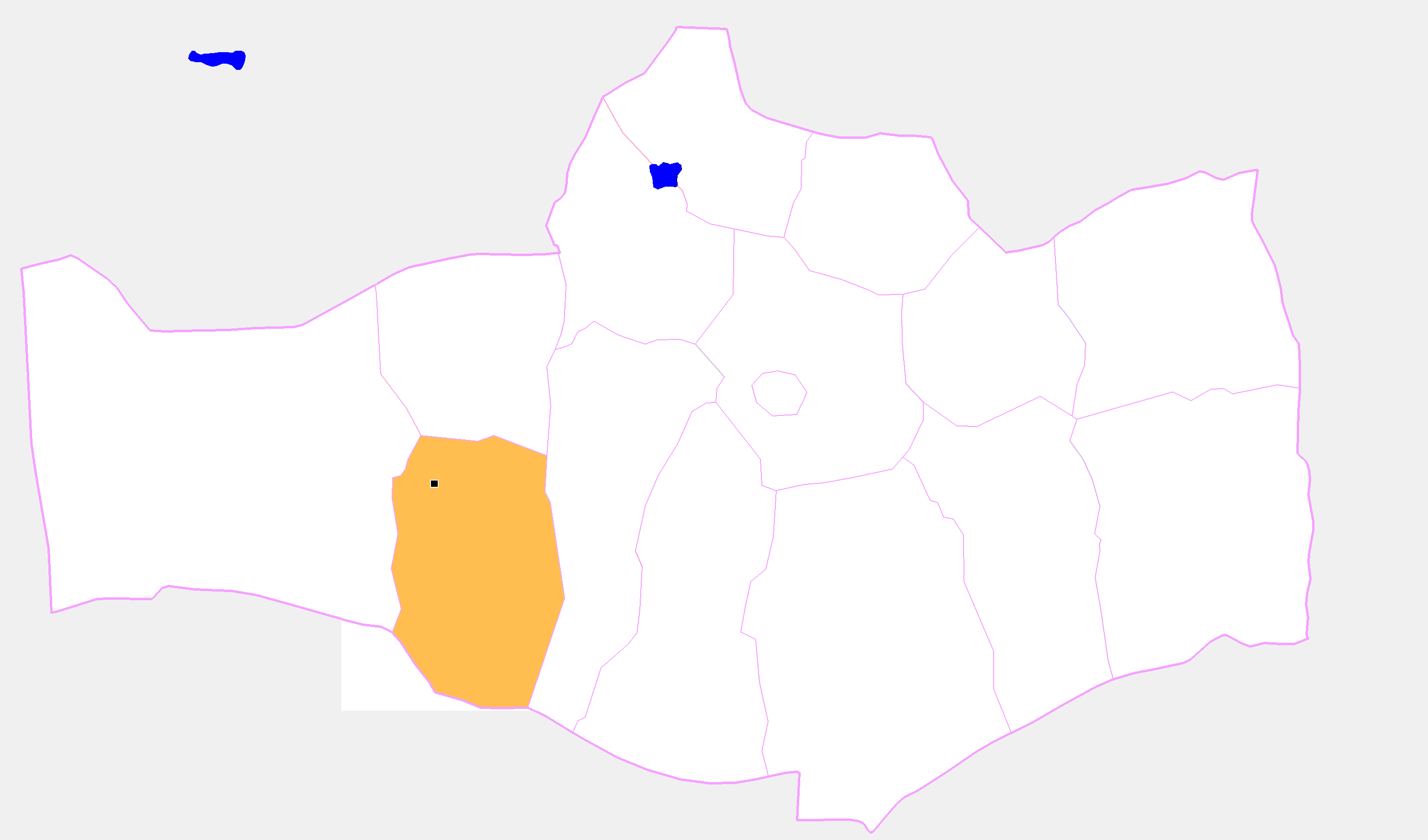
- Noyon District in Ömnögovi Province
- Country: Mongolia
- Province: Ömnögovi Province

Area
  - Total: 10,550 km^{2} (4,070 sq mi)
- Time zone: UTC+8 (UTC + 8)

Noyon (Mongolian: Ноён "lord") is a sum (district) of Ömnögovi Province in southern Mongolia. In 2009, its population was 1,318.

== Administrative divisions ==
The district is divided into two bags, which are:

- Ganzagad
- Sairan

== Notable people ==
- Dulamyn Puntsag, former judge of the Supreme Court of Mongolia
