= Ovoo =

Stone or wooden mounds used in Mongolian culture

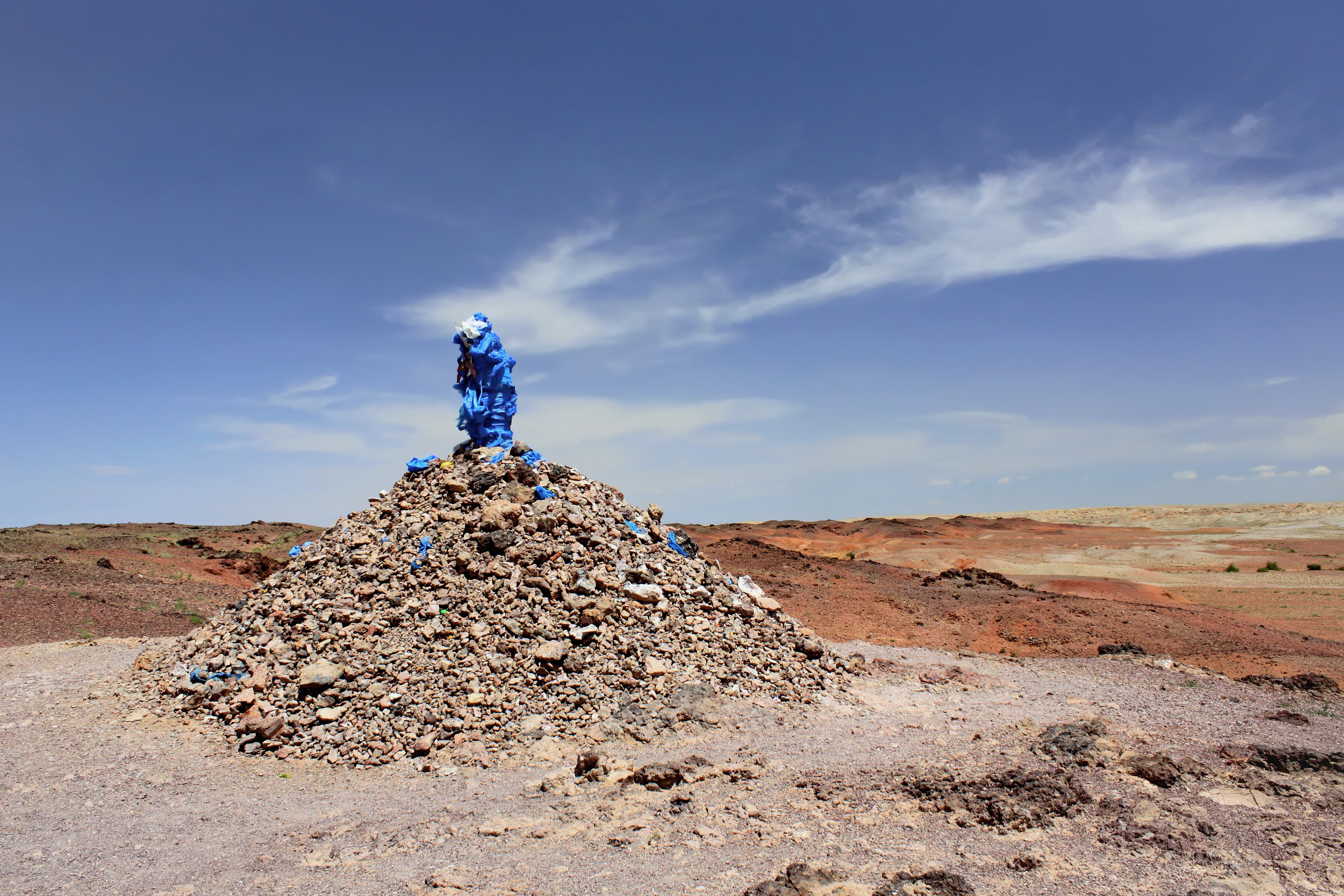
Ovoo in the Gobi desert, Dornogovi, Mongolia

Ovoo, oboo, or obo (Mongolian: овоо, , Buryat: обоо, Khakas: обаа, romanized: obâ, Traditional Mongol: ᠣᠪᠤᠭ᠎ᠠ, 'heap'; Chinese: 敖包 áobāo, lit. 'magnificent bundle' [i.e. 'shrine']) are cairns used as border markers or shrines in Mongolian folk religious practice and in the religious practices of other Mongolic peoples. While some ovoos simply consist of a mound of stones, most have branches and khadag stuck into them. In the absence of stones, ovoos can be made entirely of branches, or even soil or sand.

Ovoos are often found at the top of mountains and in high places like mountain passes. In modern times, some of them have developed into large and elaborate structures, becoming more like temples than simple altars. They serve mainly as sites for the worship of Heaven and lesser gods led by shamans and kins' elders, but also for Buddhist ceremonies.

== Historical background ==
Buddhist ritual surrounding ovoo has been dated back as far as the 16th century, but some scholars believe that the origin of ovoo dates back to prehistory. Texts used by Mongolian lamas to set up and perform offerings to ovoos were written by the third Mergen Gegeen in the 19th century. While the view that ovoos were remnants of Mongolian shamanism within Buddhism was expounded by Buryat scholar Dorzhi Banzarov, ovoos have been found to have only been used as markers instead of sacred sites prior to the rise of Tibetan Buddhism in Mongolia.

Ovoo worship was officially prohibited along with other forms of religion during Mongolia's communist period, but a major revival since 1990 has seen it become one of the most prominent aspects of revived religious practice.

== Hazards to ovoos ==
While Mongolia was under communist rule, ovoo worship was legally barred.

In the modern era, mining operations pose a threat to ovoos.

== Customs ==
Ovoos in Gorkhi Terelj video

Ovoo are most often located on higher ground, like mountain passes and mountain tops. Ovoo can also sometimes be found near rivers or springs or at important crossroads.

When travelling, it is the custom to stop and circle an ovoo three times, moving clockwise, in order to have a safer journey. Usually, rocks are picked up from the ground and added to the pile. Also, one may leave offerings in the form of sweets, money, milk, or vodka. If one is in a hurry while traveling and does not have time to stop at an ovoo, honking of the horn while passing by the ovoo will suffice. Many ovoo also have animal skulls on top of them.

== In ceremony ==
Ovoos are the site for Heaven worship ceremonies that typically take place at the end of summer. Worshippers place a tree branch or stick in the ovoo and tie a blue khadag, a ceremonial silk scarf symbolic of the open sky and the sky spirit Tengri, or Tengger, to the branch. They then light a fire and make food offerings, followed by a ceremonial dance and prayers (worshippers sitting at the northwest side of the ovoo), and a feast with the food left over from the offering.

== In location names ==
A number of placenames have the word Ovoo in their name:

- Mongolia
  - Bayan-Ovoo, Bayankhongor
  - Bayan-Ovoo, Khentii
  - Bayan-Ovoo, Ömnögovi
  - Mandal-Ovoo, Ömnögovi
  - Saikhan-Ovoo, Dundgovi
  - Tsagaan-Ovoo, Dornod
- Inner Mongolia
  - Bayan Obo, in Inner Mongolia

== In popular culture ==
Ovoos are featured in Age of Empires IV as a special building used by the Mongols.

== Gallery ==
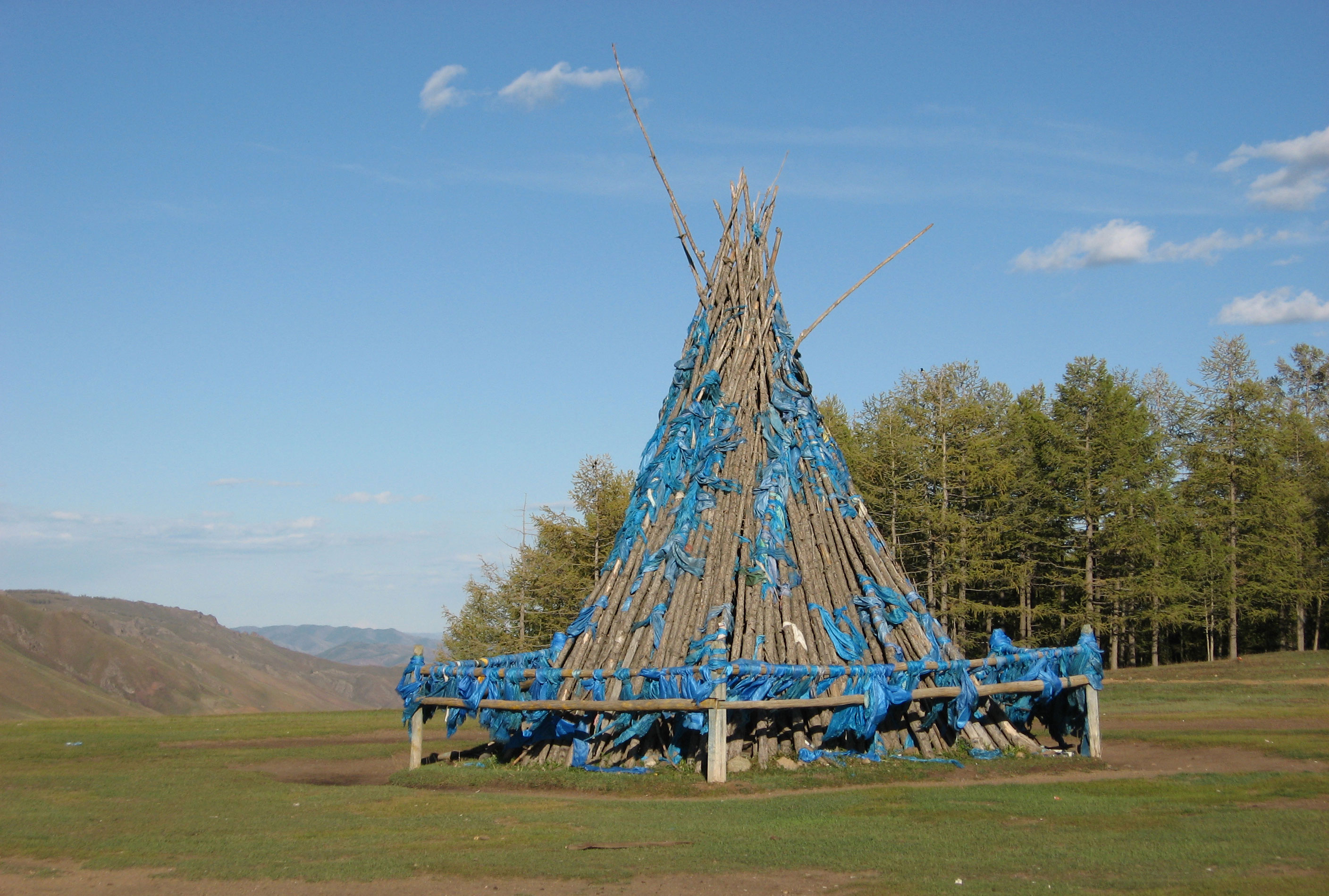
Wooden ovoo in Mörön, Khövsgöl, Mongolia

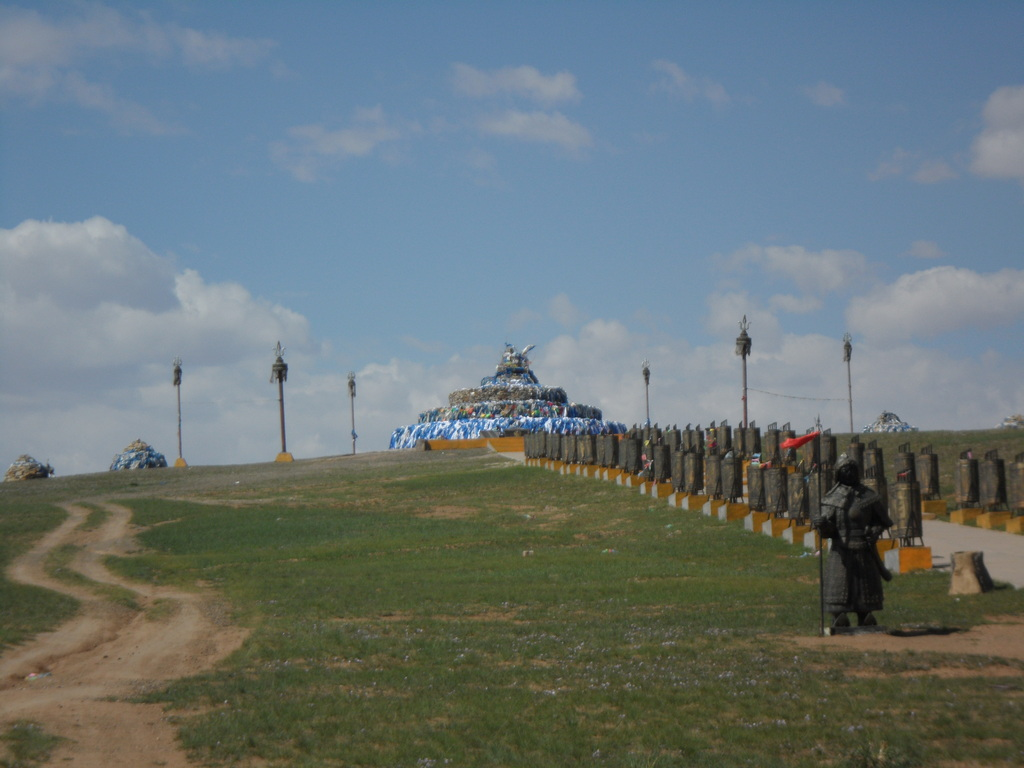
Elaborate ovoo with prayer wheels leading to it in Hohhot, Inner Mongolia, China

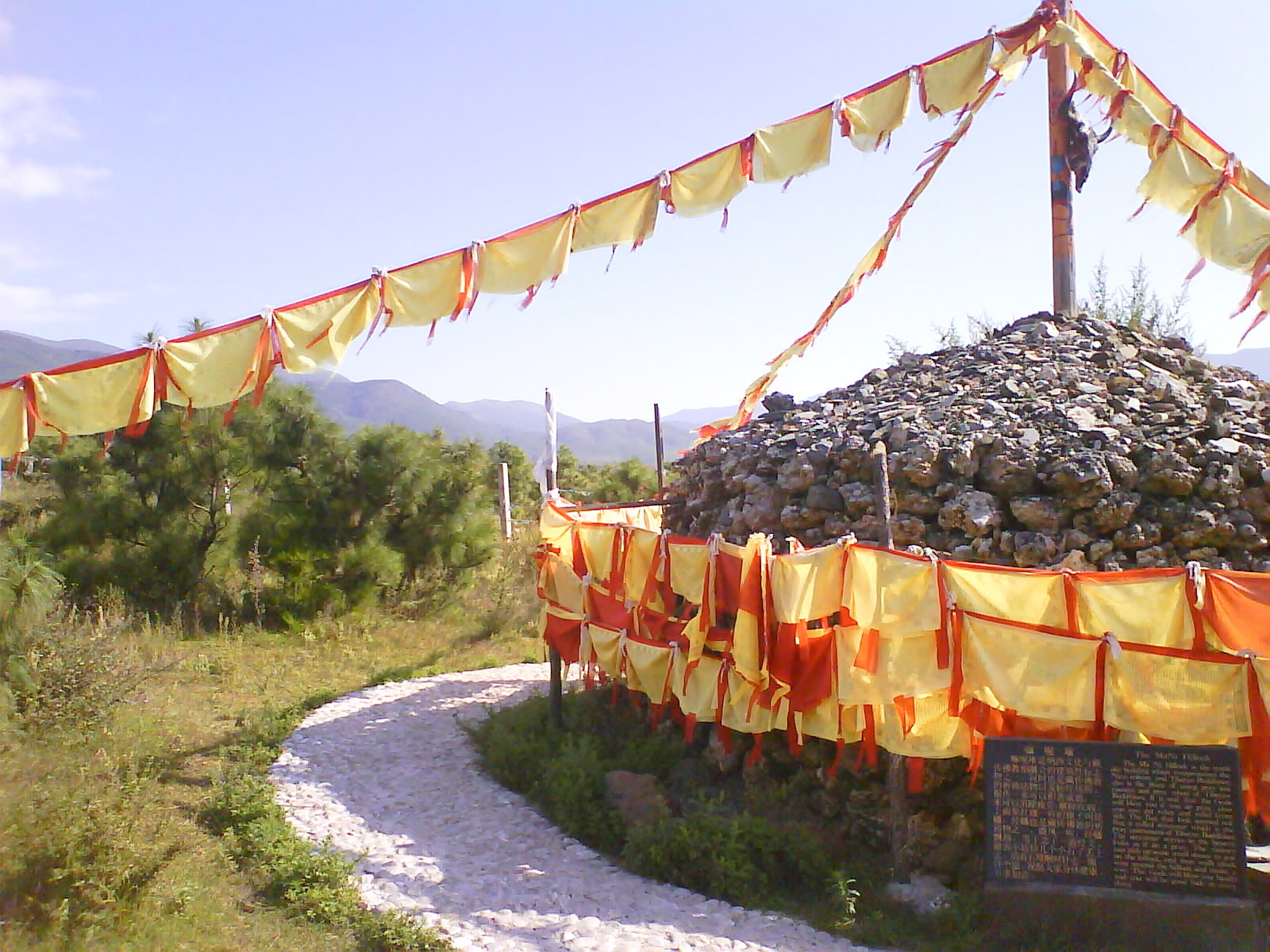
Dongba ovoo in Yunnan, China
