= Khata =

Traditional ceremonial scarf in Tibetan Buddhism

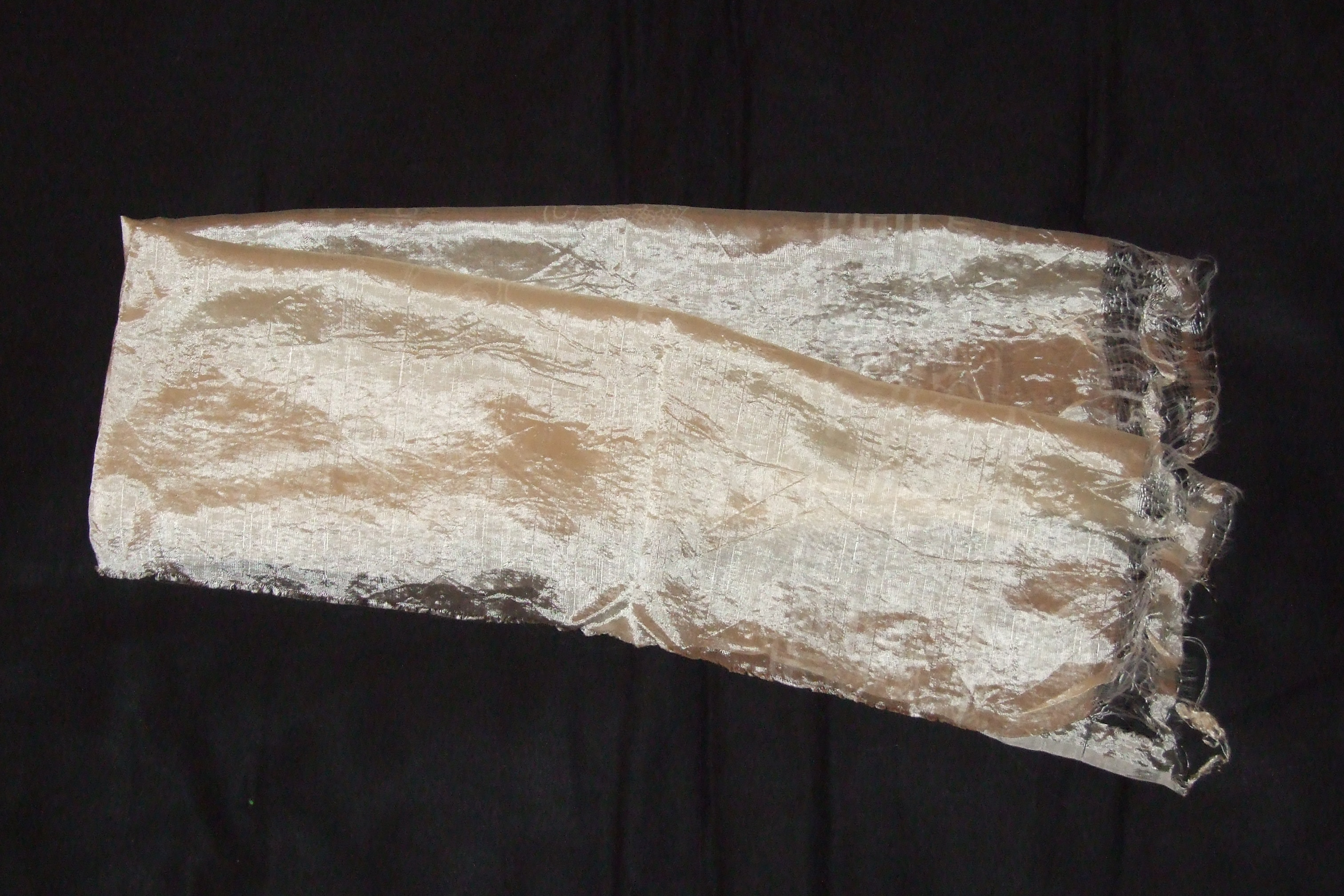
- A Tibetan khata

Chinese name
- Chinese: 哈達
Transcriptions
Standard Mandarin
- Hanyu Pinyin: hādá
other Mandarin
- Dungan: хада
Yue: Cantonese
- Jyutping: haa^{5} daat^{6}

Tibetan name
- Tibetan: ཁ་བཏགས་
Transcriptions
- Wylie: kha-btags
- THL: khatak
- Tibetan Pinyin: katak

Mongolian name
- Mongolian Cyrillic: хадаг
- Mongolian script: ᠬᠠᠳᠠᠭ

Nepali name
- Nepali: खतक khatak

Dzongkha name
- Dzongkha: བཀབ་ནས

Buryat name
- Buryat: хадаг khadag

Tuvan name
- Tuvan: кадак kadak

Kyrgyz name
- Kyrgyz: حاداق хадак hadak

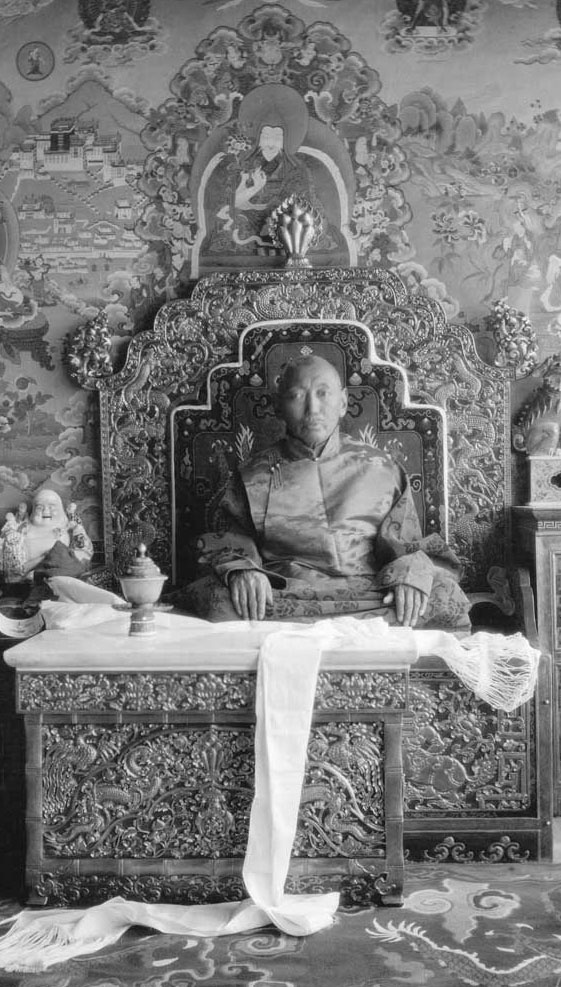
13th Dalai Lama of Tibet (1932)

A khata /ˈkætə/ or khatag (Note: Tibetan: ཁ་བཏགས་; Dzongkha: དར་ dhar; Mongolian and Buryat: ᠬᠠᠳᠠᠭ хадаг, khadag [ˈχatəq]; Tuvan: кадак or хадак, kadak or hadak, [qɐˈtɐq] or [χɐˈtɐq]; Nepali: खतक khatak [ˈkʰʌt̪ʌk]; simplified Chinese: 哈达; traditional Chinese: 哈達; pinyin: hādá/hǎdá.) is a traditional ceremonial scarf in Tibetan Buddhism and in Tengriism. It is widely used by the Tibetan, Nepalese, Bhutanese, Ladakhi, Mongolian, Buryat, and Tuvan peoples on various occasions. It originated in Tibetan culture and is common in cultures and countries where Tibetan Buddhism is practiced or has strong influence. The practice of using khatas has influenced people of other communities too who are in close relation to these communities. It is predominantly used in Tibet, followed by other parts of the world. It is a symbol of honour and respect. It is used in Tibetan religious ceremony and in traditional dances, and is offered in monasteries and in temples.

In Nepal, a khata is used as a gift for various occasions like wedding, graduation, electoral victory, winning an award and several other major lifestones. Generally, the guests or invitees at the reception would put khata on the host of such parties. It is used by both Hindus and Buddhists of Nepal in that manner.

== History ==
Tibetan people used to give animal skins as gifts because there was no silk in Tibet. According to the Bon historical record, people would put sheep wool around their necks during the time of the ninth king, Degong Jayshi, and head for some religious rituals. This tradition was passed down from that moment onwards. People began making scarves and using silk over time. So, the scarf replaced the plain sheep's wool and people put scarves on the neck and head.

== Uses and types ==
The khata symbolizes purity and compassion and is worn or presented with incense at many ceremonial occasions, including births, weddings, funerals, graduations and the arrival or departure of guests. When given as a farewell gesture it symbolizes a safe journey. When given to arriving guests it symbolizes welcome. They were usually made of silk but now much more commonly cotton or polyester. Tibetan khatas are usually white, symbolising the pure heart of the giver, though it is quite common to find yellow-gold khata as well. Tibetan, Nepali, and Bhutanese khatas feature the ashtamangala. There are also special multi-colored khatas. Mongolian khatas are usually blue, symbolizing the blue sky. In Mongolia, khatas are also often tied to ovoos, suvargas, or special trees and rocks.

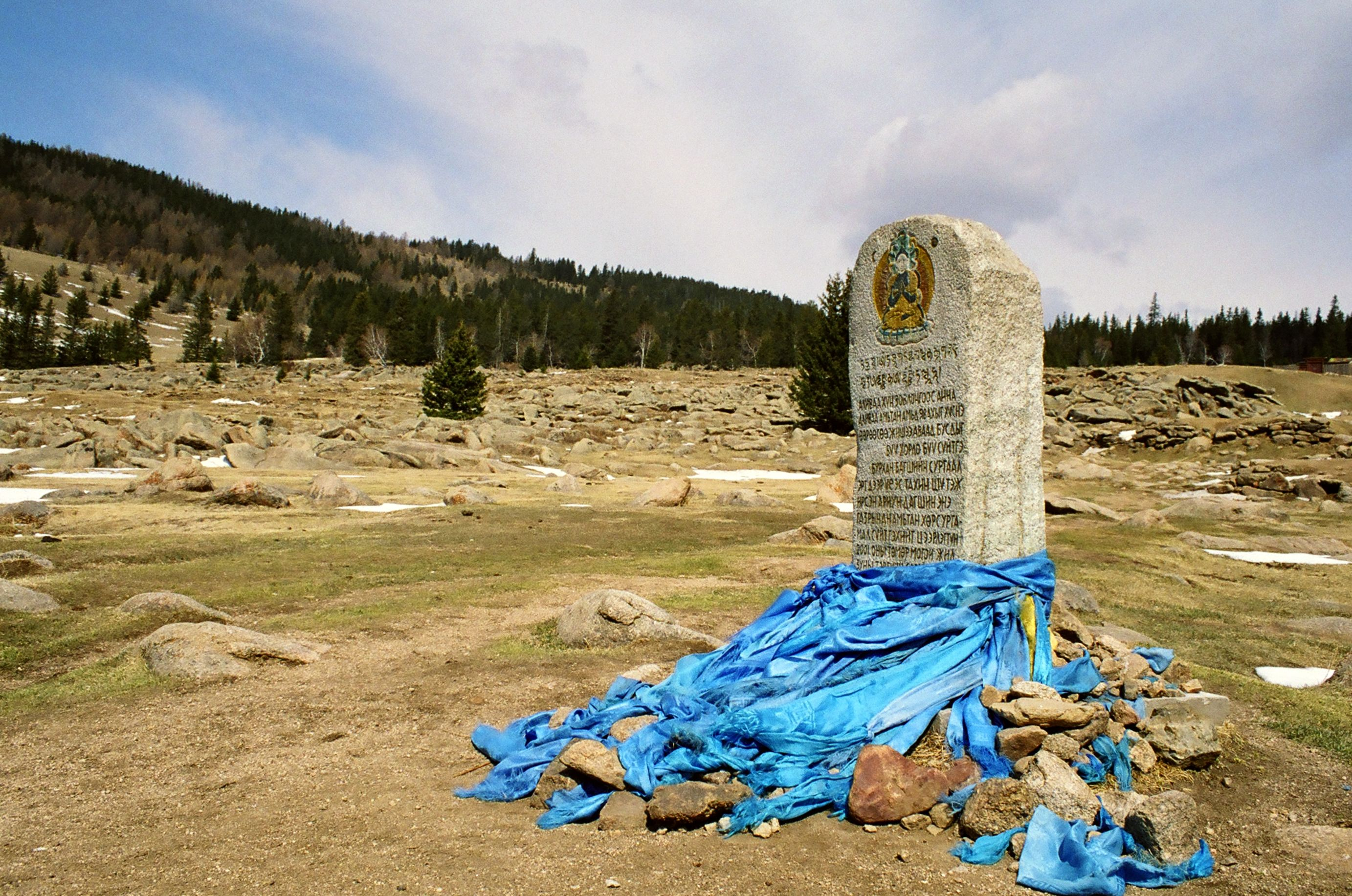
Blue khatas tied to a stone stele at the former Manjusri Monastery, Mongolia, which was destroyed by Mongolian communists in 1937
