= Manlai, Ömnögovi =

District in Ömnögovi Province, Mongolia

Coordinates: 44°04′51″N 106°52′04″E

Manlai District Манлай сум ᠮᠩᠯᠠᠢᠰᠤᠮᠤ
- District
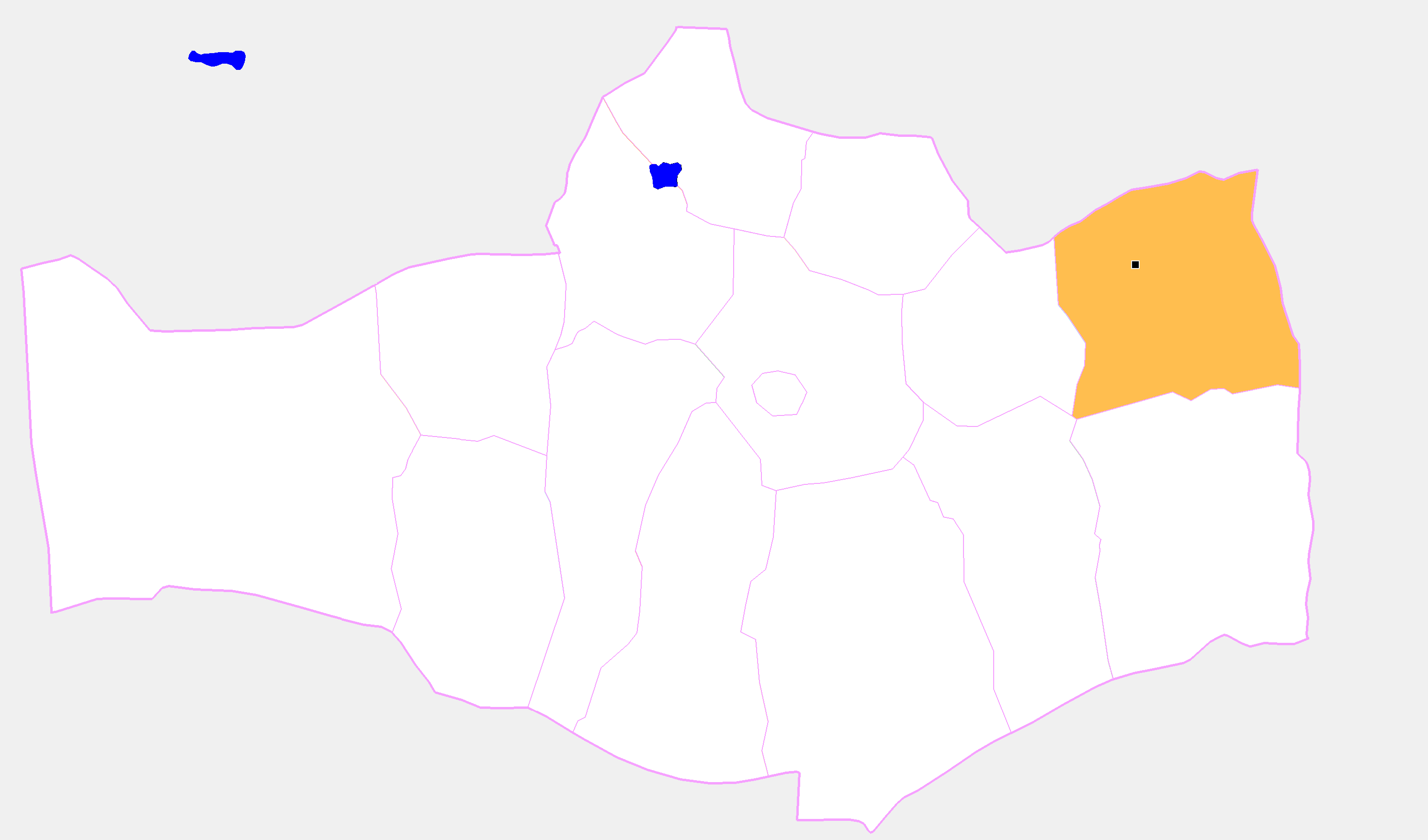
- Manlai District in Ömnögovi Province
- Country: Mongolia
- Province: Ömnögovi Province

Area
  - Total: 12,418 km^{2} (4,795 sq mi)
- Time zone: UTC+8 (UTC + 8)

Manlai (Mongolian: Манлай "vanguard") is a sum (district) of Ömnögovi Province in southern Mongolia. In 2009, its population was 2,450.

== Administrative divisions ==
The district is divided into four bags, which are:

- Dalai
- Jargalant
- Uguumur
- Uyekhii
