= Mandal-Ovoo, Ömnögovi =

District in Ömnögovi Province, Mongolia

Coordinates: 44°39′00″N 104°04′13″E

Mandal-Ovoo District Мандал-Овоо сум ᠮᠠᠨᠳᠠᠯᠣᠪᠤᠭ᠎ᠠᠰᠤᠮᠤ
- District
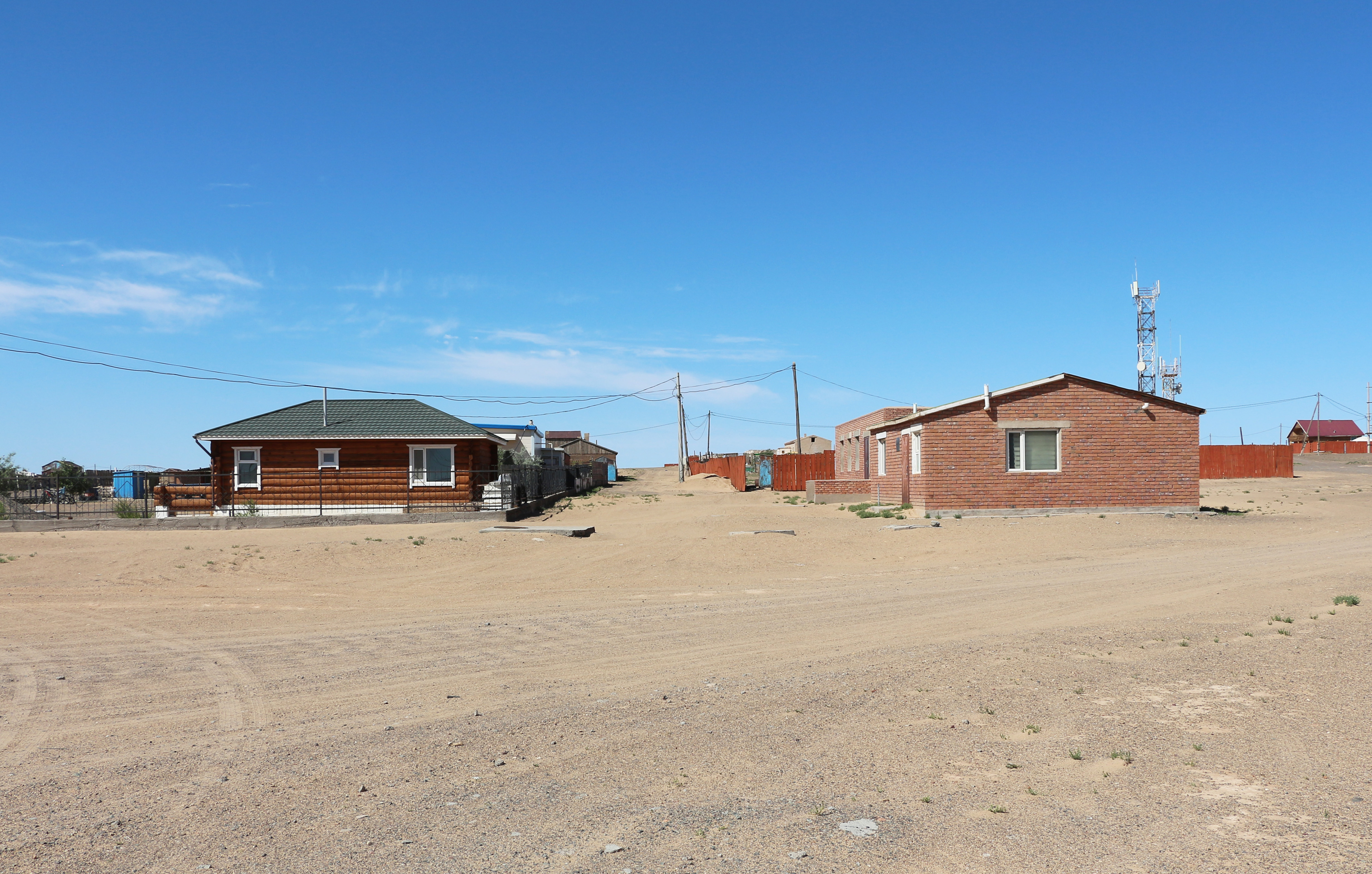

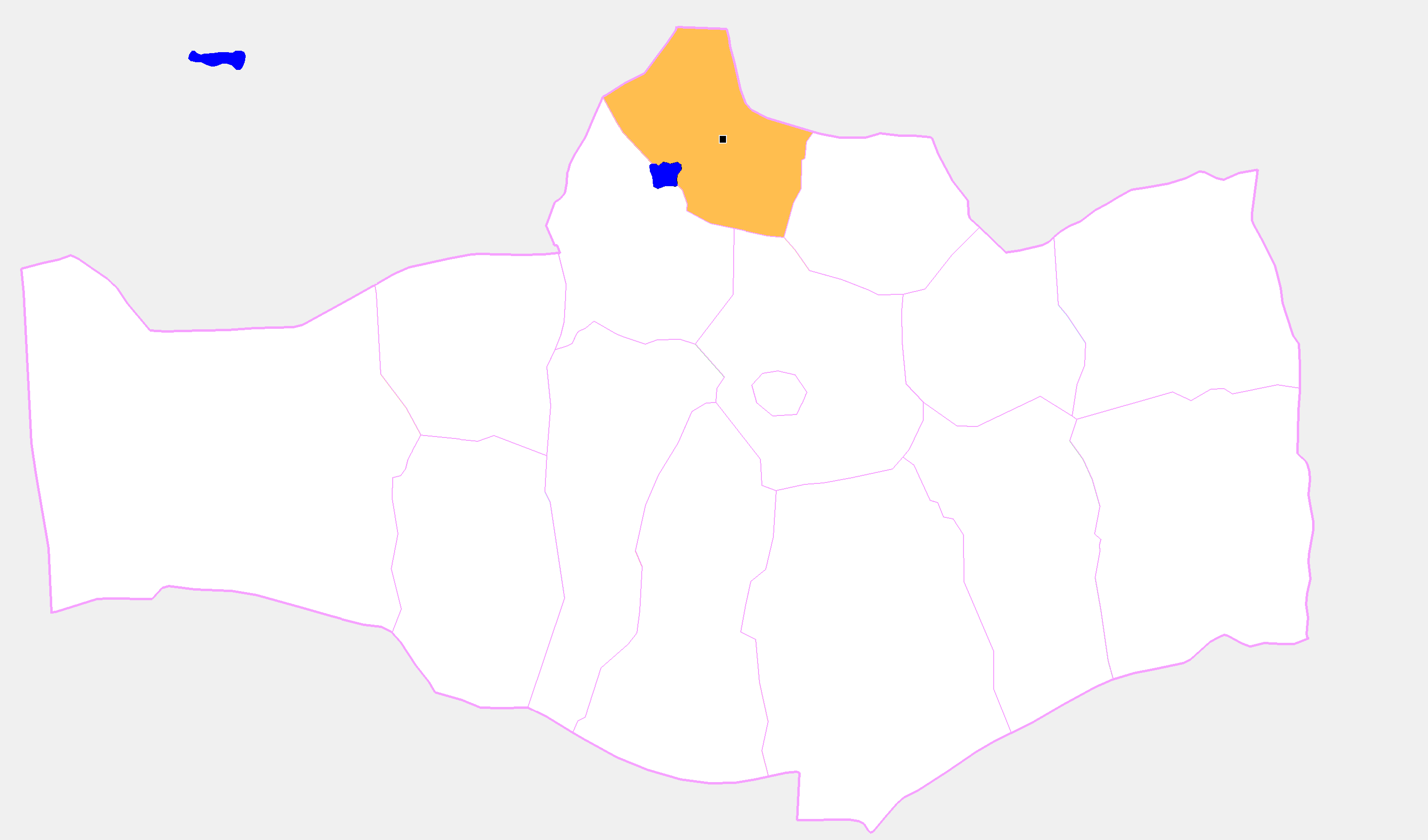
- Mandal-Ovoo District in Ömnögovi Province
- Country: Mongolia
- Province: Ömnögovi Province

Area
  - Total: 6,433 km^{2} (2,484 sq mi)
- Time zone: UTC+8 (UTC + 8)

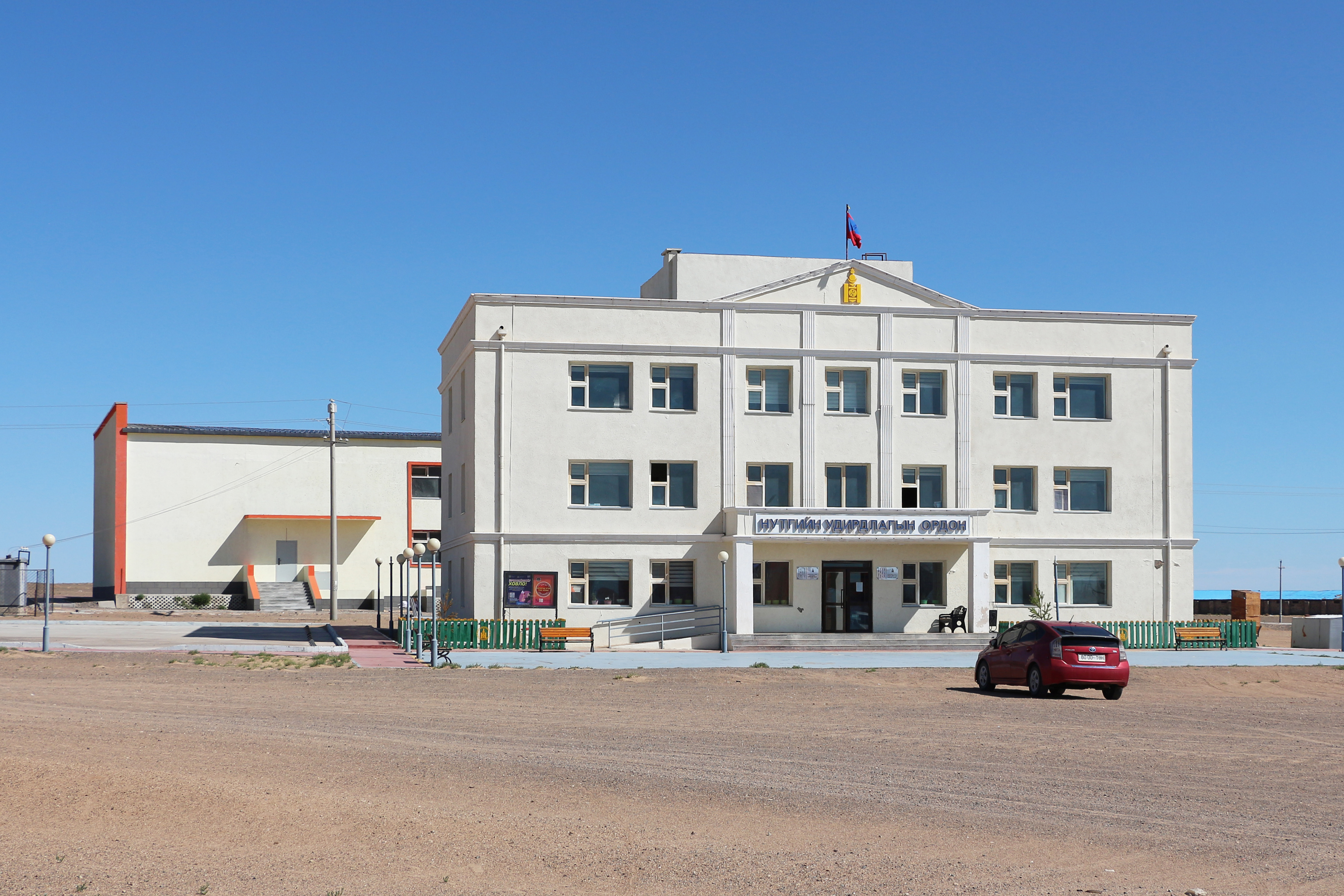
Mandal-Ovoo District government building

Mandal-Ovoo (Mongolian: Мандал-Овоо, Rising ovoo) is a sum (district) of Ömnögovi Province in southern Mongolia. In 2009, its population was 1,954.

== Geography ==
The district has a total area of 6,433 km^{2}. It is the northern most district in Ömnögovi Province.

== Administrative divisions ==
The district is divided into three bags, which are:

- Bayankhoshuu
- Mandal
- Utgun
