= Khan khongor, Ömnögovi =

District in Ömnögovi Province, Mongolia

Coordinates: 43°46′57″N 104°28′52″E

Khan khongor District Ханхонгор сум ᠬᠠᠩᠬᠣᠩᠭ᠋ᠤᠷᠰᠤᠮᠤ
- District
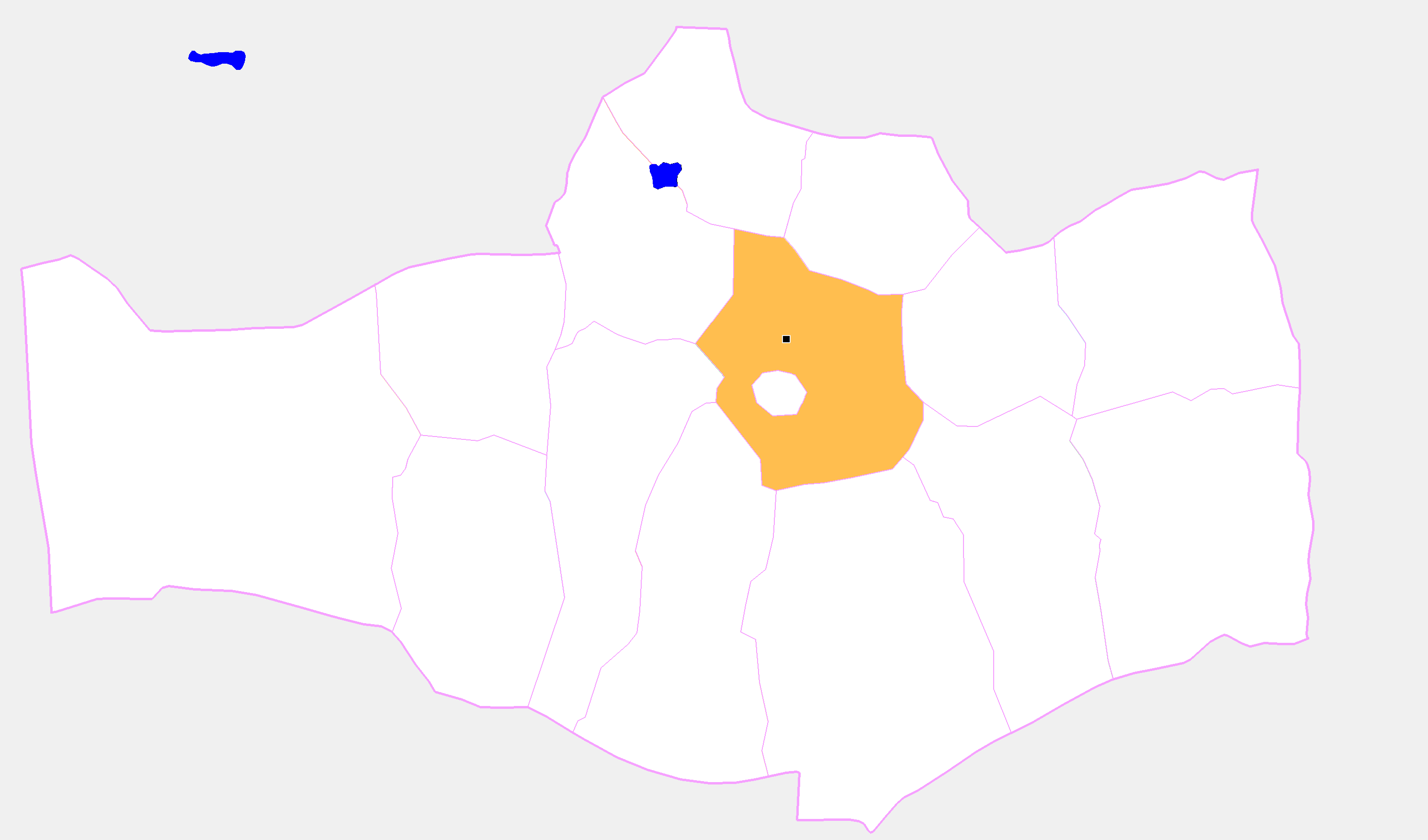
- Khan khongor District in Ömnögovi Province
- Country: Mongolia
- Province: Ömnögovi Province

Area
  - Total: 9,931 km^{2} (3,834 sq mi)
- Time zone: UTC+8 (UTC + 8)

Khan khongor (Mongolian: Хан хонгор) is a sum (district) of Ömnögovi Province in southern Mongolia. In 2009, its population was 2,376.

== Geography ==
The district has a total area of 9,931 km^{2}. The district fully encircles Dalanzadgad, the capital of the province.

== Administrative divisions ==
The district is divided into four bags, which are:

- Jargalant
- Khondot
- Mandakh
- Uguumur

== Economy ==
- Baruun Naran Coal Mine
