= Bayan-Ovoo, Bayankhongor =

District in Bayankhongor Province, Mongolia

Bayan-Ovoo District Баян-Овоо сум ᠪᠠᠶ᠋ᠠᠨᠣᠪᠤᠭ᠎ᠠᠰᠤᠮᠤ
- District
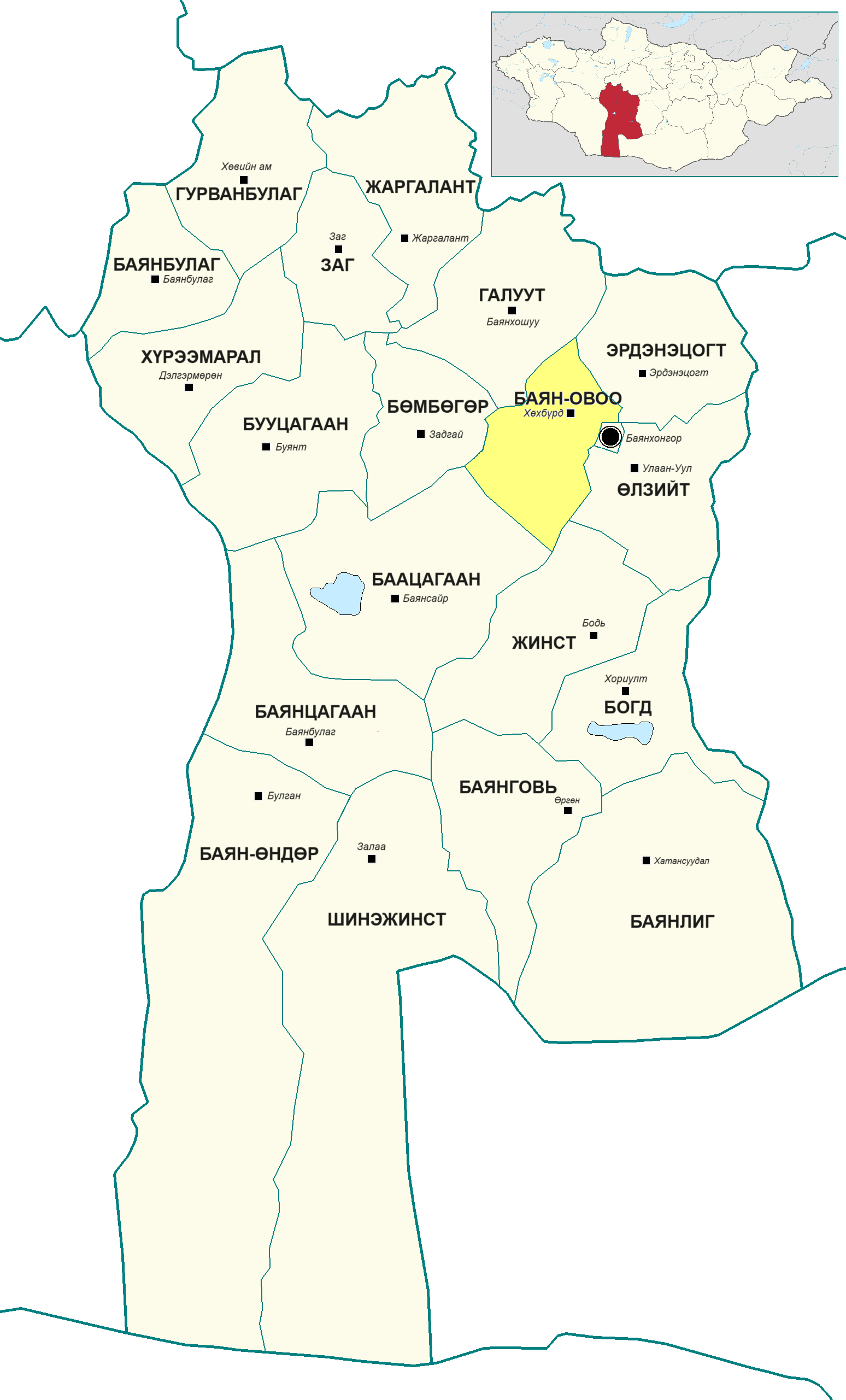
- Bayan-Ovoo District in Bayankhongor Province

- Location in Mongolia
- Coordinates: 46°17′14″N 100°27′06″E
- Country: Mongolia
- Province: Bayankhongor

Area
  - Total: 1,253 sq mi (3,244 km^{2})
- Time zone: UTC+8 (UTC+8)

Bayan-Ovoo (Mongolian: Баян-Овоо, Rich ovoo) is a sum (district) of Bayankhongor Province in Mongolia. In 2006, its population was 2,912.

== Administrative divisions ==
The district is divided into four bags, which are:

- Asgamba
- Mandalkhairkhan
- Mergen
- Urankhairkhan
