= Nomgon, Ömnögovi =

Soum in Ömnögovi Province, Mongolia

Coordinates: 42°50′26″N 105°08′18″E

Nomgon District Номгон сум ᠨᠣᠮᠭᠤᠨᠰᠤᠮᠤ
- District
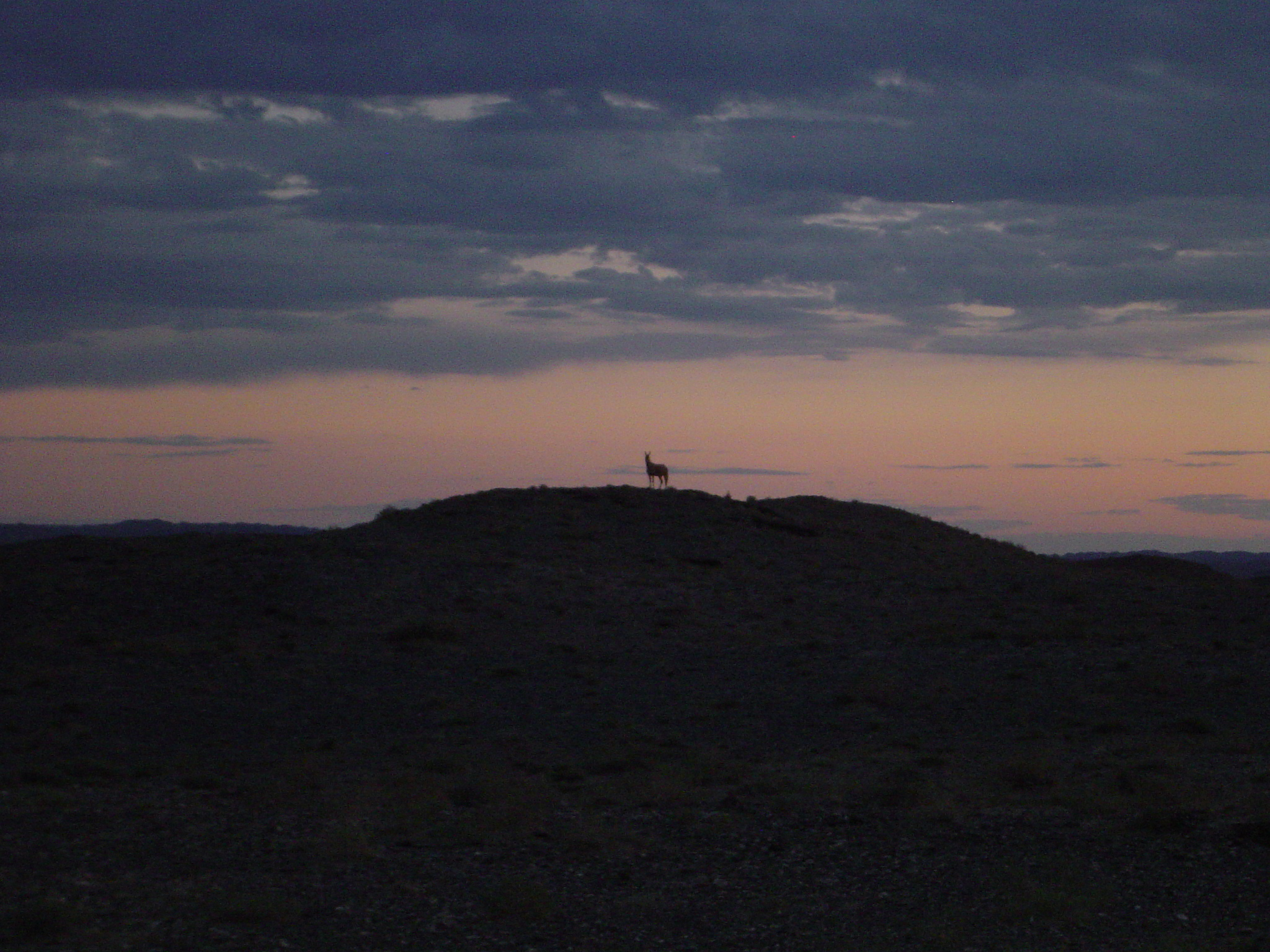
- A khulan at sunset, in Nomgon

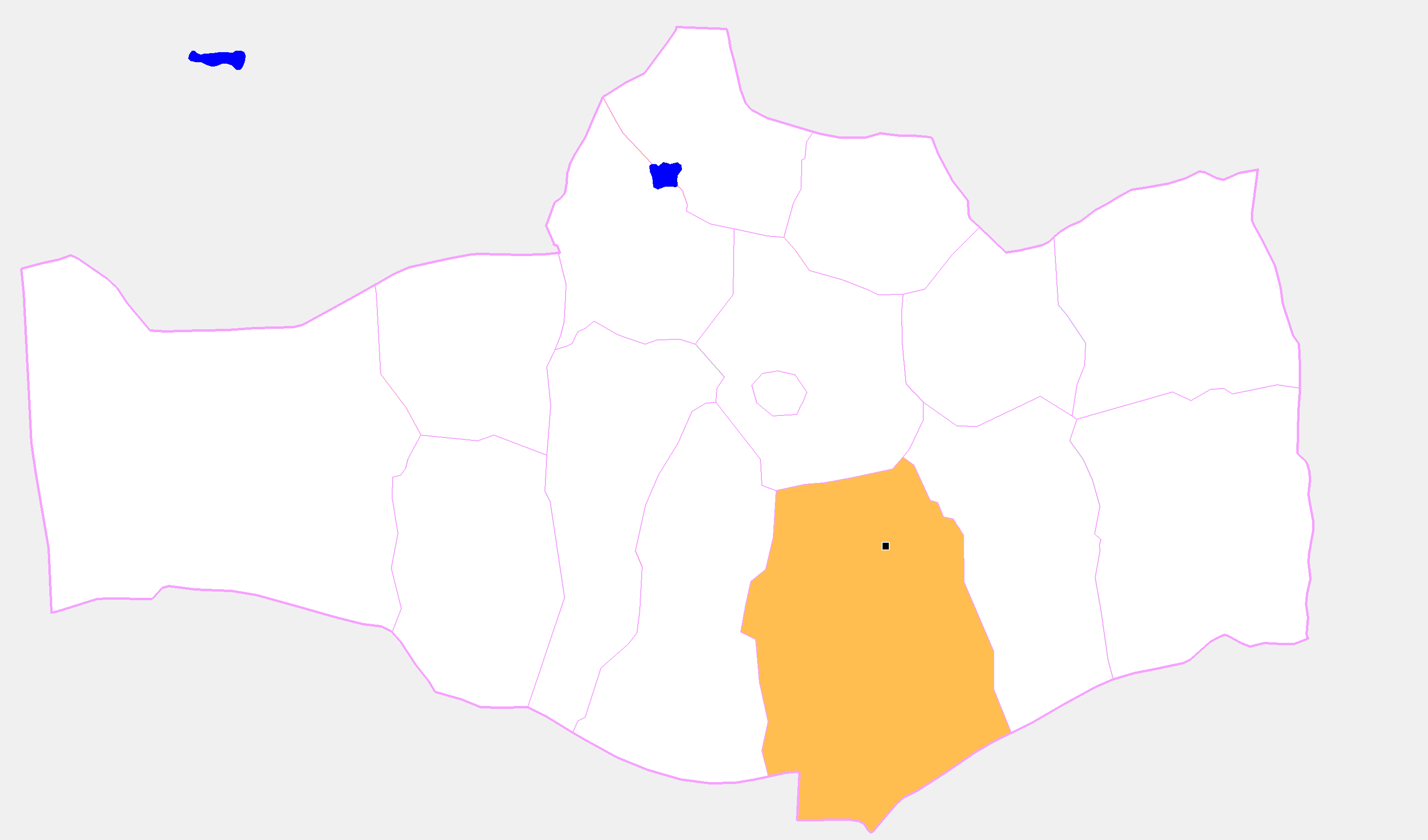
- Nomgon District in Ömnögovi Province
- Country: Mongolia
- Province: Ömnögovi Province

Area
  - Total: 19,468 km^{2} (7,517 sq mi)
- Time zone: UTC+8 (UTC + 8)

Nomgon (Mongolian: Номгон "peaceful") is a sum (district) of Ömnögovi Province in Mongolia. In 2009, its population was 2,869.

The distance from the center to the border of China is approximately 170 km. The population is about 2,800. It has a school, a hospital, a post-office, a small hotel, and a small shop. The temple (Sangiin Dalai) was built about 300 years ago, with some parts having been repaired and refreshed in more recent years.

== Administrative divisions ==
The district is divided into five bags, which are:

- Bogt
- Dersene-Us
- Emgenbulag
- Kharmagtai
- Tukhum

== Geography ==
Nomgon is the southern most sum of Ömnögovi Province and also the southern most sum in Mongolia.
