= Bulgan, Ömnögovi =

District in Ömnögovi Province, Mongolia

Coordinates: 44°05′44″N 103°32′37″E

Bulgan District Булган сум ᠪᠤᠯᠠᠭᠠᠨᠰᠤᠮᠤ
- District
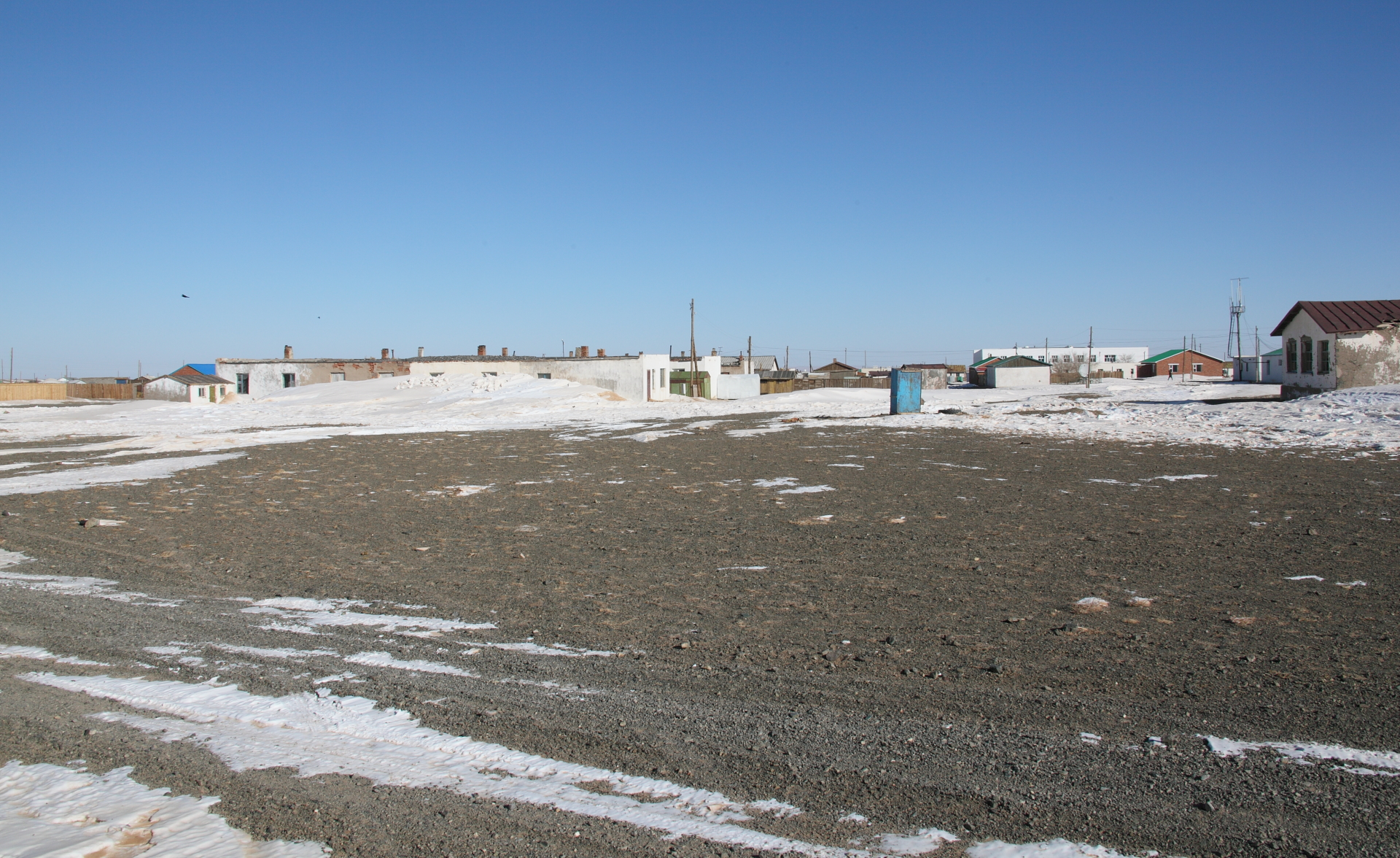

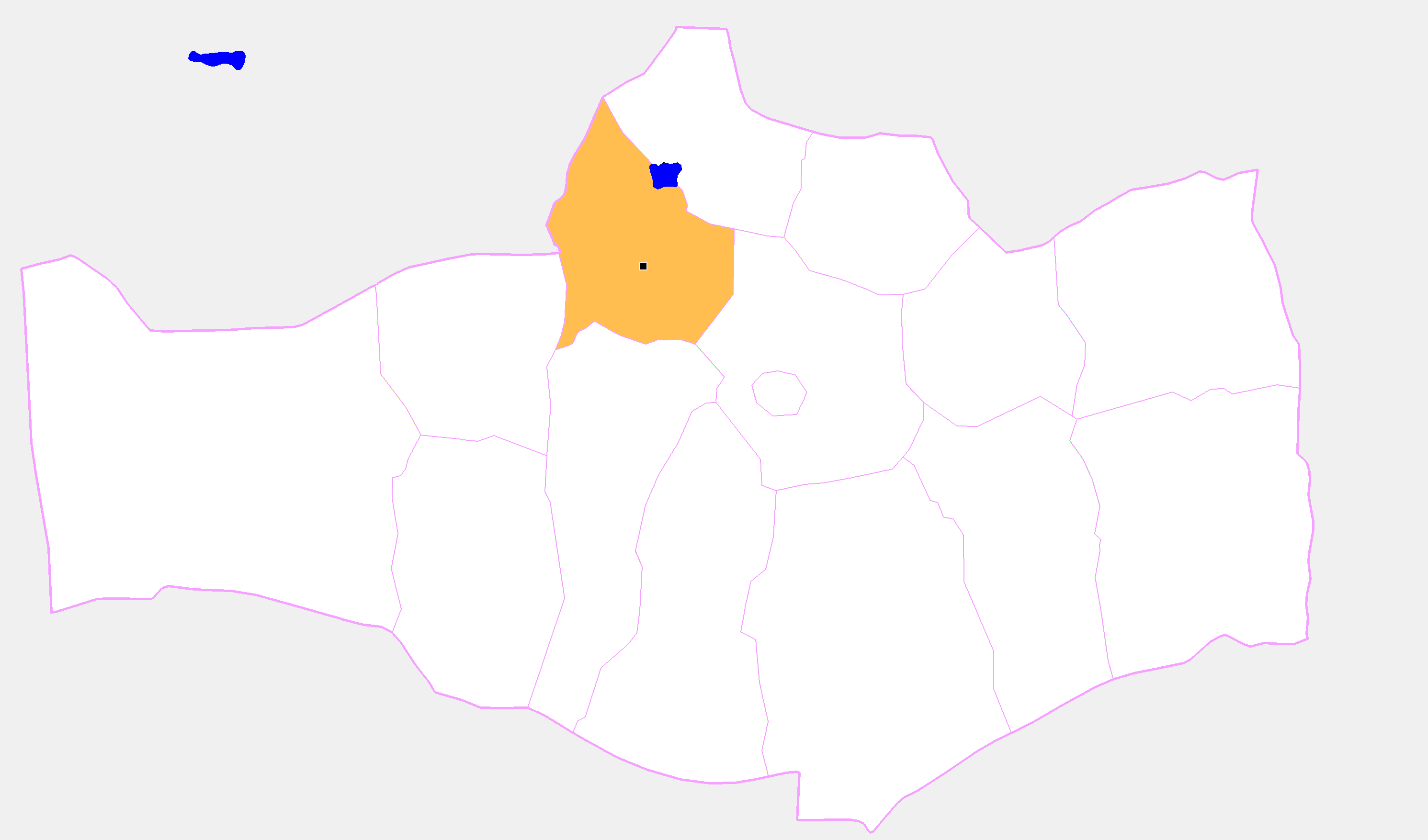
- Bulgan District in Ömnögovi Province
- Country: Mongolia
- Province: Ömnögovi Province

Area
  - Total: 7,498 km^{2} (2,895 sq mi)
- Time zone: UTC+8 (UTC + 8)

Bulgan (Mongolian: Булган) is a sum (district) of Ömnögovi Province in southern Mongolia. Its population in 2009 was 2,395.

== Administrative divisions ==
The district is divided into four bags, which are:

- Bulgan
- Dal
- Den
- Khavtsgait
