= Bayan-Ovoo, Khentii =

District in Khentii Province, Mongolia

Bayan-Ovoo District Баян-Овоо сум ᠪᠠᠶ᠋ᠠᠨᠣᠪᠤᠭ᠎ᠠᠰᠤᠮᠤ
- District
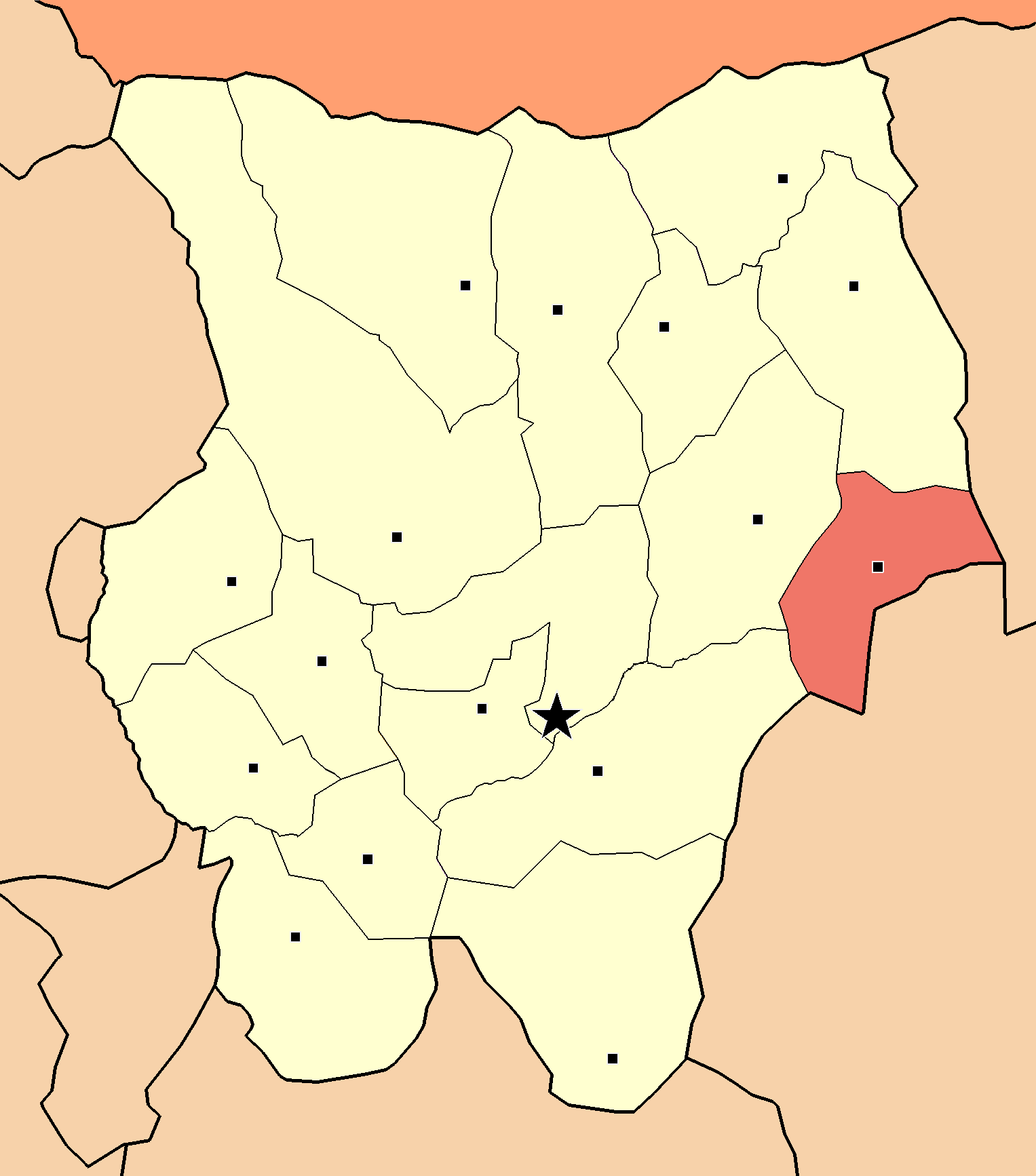
- Bayan-Ovoo District in Khentii Province

- Location in Mongolia
- Coordinates: 47°47′09″N 112°06′59″E
- Country: Mongolia
- Province: Khentii

Area
  - Total: 3,381 km^{2} (1,305 sq mi)
- Elevation: 921 m (3,022 ft)

Population (2010)
  - Total: 1,581
- Time zone: UTC+8 (UTC+8)

Bayan-Ovoo (Mongolian: Баян-Овоо is a sum (district) of Khentii Province in eastern Mongolia. The sum had a population in 2008 of 1,581 and an area of 3,381 km².

== Climate ==
Bayan-Ovoo has a continental climate (Köppen climate classification Dwb) with warm summers and severely cold winters. Most precipitation falls in the summer as rain, with some snow in autumn and spring. Winters are quite dry, with occasional light snow.

Climate data for Bayan-Ovoo, elevation 926 m (3,038 ft), (1991–2020 normals, extremes 1962–1990, 1999–2023)
Month	Jan	Feb	Mar	Apr	May	Jun	Jul	Aug	Sep	Oct	Nov	Dec	Year
Record high °C (°F)	1.9 (35.4)	7.9 (46.2)	22.3 (72.1)	30.5 (86.9)	39.7 (103.5)	40.2 (104.4)	39.8 (103.6)	36.4 (97.5)	34.1 (93.4)	28.6 (83.5)	15.6 (60.1)	3.6 (38.5)	40.2 (104.4)
Mean daily maximum °C (°F)	−16.0 (3.2)	−9.8 (14.4)	1.2 (34.2)	12.1 (53.8)	19.9 (67.8)	25.4 (77.7)	27.2 (81.0)	25.5 (77.9)	19.6 (67.3)	9.4 (48.9)	−4.1 (24.6)	−13.8 (7.2)	8.1 (46.5)
Daily mean °C (°F)	−21.7 (−7.1)	−17.1 (1.2)	−6.9 (19.6)	4.1 (39.4)	11.8 (53.2)	18.1 (64.6)	20.6 (69.1)	18.0 (64.4)	11.6 (52.9)	1.5 (34.7)	−10.8 (12.6)	−19.3 (−2.7)	0.8 (33.5)
Mean daily minimum °C (°F)	−26.7 (−16.1)	−23.8 (−10.8)	−14.5 (5.9)	−3.6 (25.5)	3.2 (37.8)	10.5 (50.9)	13.7 (56.7)	10.6 (51.1)	3.5 (38.3)	−5.4 (22.3)	−16.5 (2.3)	−24.1 (−11.4)	−6.1 (21.0)
Record low °C (°F)	−42.7 (−44.9)	−40.3 (−40.5)	−37.1 (−34.8)	−20.3 (−4.5)	−10.8 (12.6)	−1.3 (29.7)	1.1 (34.0)	−3.4 (25.9)	−12.0 (10.4)	−24.8 (−12.6)	−34.7 (−30.5)	−42.5 (−44.5)	−42.7 (−44.9)
Average precipitation mm (inches)	3.0 (0.12)	3.9 (0.15)	4.3 (0.17)	9.0 (0.35)	20.9 (0.82)	45.7 (1.80)	66.1 (2.60)	56.3 (2.22)	26.8 (1.06)	12.0 (0.47)	7.4 (0.29)	4.5 (0.18)	259.9 (10.23)
Average precipitation days (≥ 1.0 mm)	1.0	1.3	1.7	2.7	3.9	7.1	8.5	8.0	4.8	2.4	2.5	1.6	45.5
Source 1: NOAA (extremes 1962–1990)
Source 2: Starlings Roost Weather

== Administrative divisions ==
The district is divided into four bags, which are:

- Delgerkhaan (Дэлгэрхаан)
- Javkhlant (Жавхлант)
- Naran (Наран)
- Sumber (Сүмбэр)
