= Ömnögovi Province =

Province of Mongolia

Ömnögovi Province Өмнөговь аймаг ᠡᠮᠦᠨᠡᠭᠣᠪᠢᠠᠶᠢᠮᠠᠭ
- Province
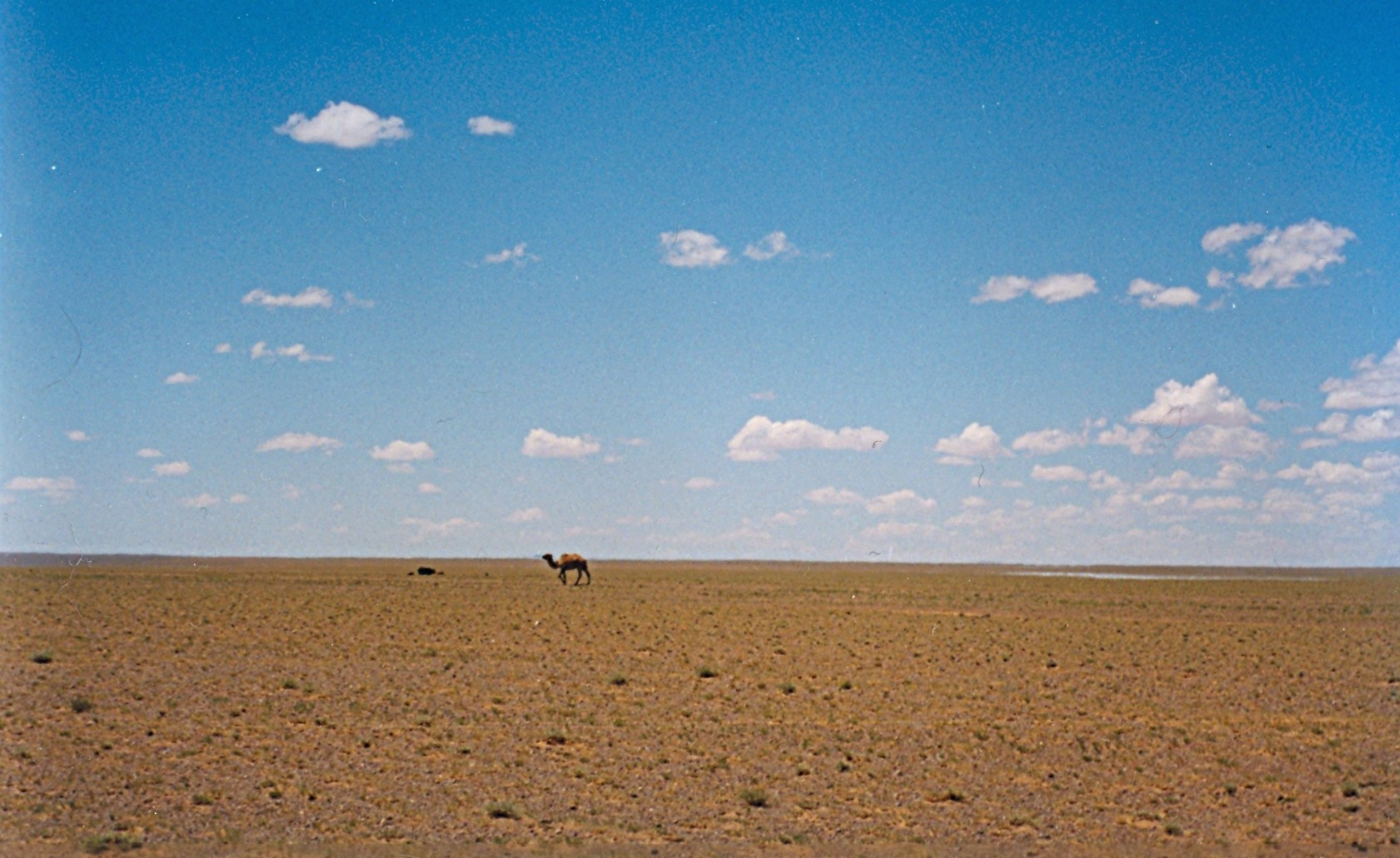
- Landscape in Ömnögovi Province

- Flag Coat of arms

- Coordinates: 43°0′N 104°15′E
- Country: Mongolia
- Established: 1931
- Capital: Dalanzadgad

Area
  - Total: 165,380.47 km^{2} (63,853.76 sq mi)

Population (2023)
  - Total: 76,153
  - Density: 0.46047/km^{2} (1.1926/sq mi)

GDP
  - Total: MNT 3,429 billion US$ 1.0 billion (2023)
  - Per capita: MNT 45,028,216; US$ 13,202 (2023)
- Time zone: UTC+8
- Area code: +976 (0)153
- ISO 3166 code: MN-053
- Vehicle registration: ӨМ_
- Website: www.omnogovi.gov.mn/home.shtml

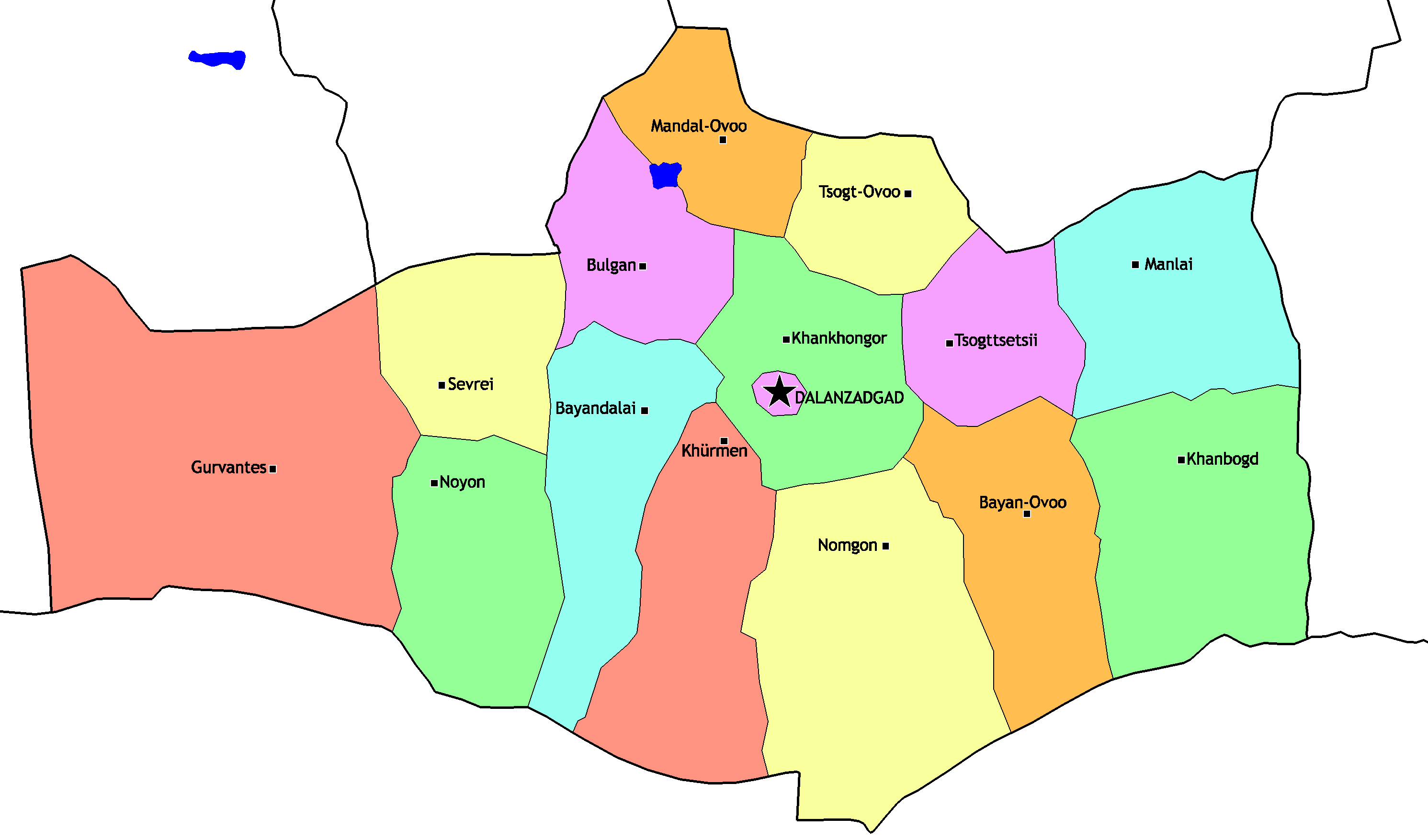
Sums of Ömnögovi Aimag

Ömnögovi (Mongolian: Өмнөговь [ɵ́mn.ʁœw̜]) or South Gobi Province is the southernmost and largest province of Mongolia, located in the Gobi Desert. Its capital is Dalanzadgad.

The province is rich in mineral deposits, including gold and copper. Agriculture is of minor importance. Vegetables are grown in some oases—for example, in Dal near Dalanzadgad.

As the aimag has various sights to offer, tourism is gaining importance. Ömnögovi includes several well known tourist areas, including the Flaming Cliffs, Gobi Gurvansaikhan National Park and Khongoryn Els—the Singing Sand Dunes.

== Transportation ==
The Dalanzadgad Airport (ZMDZ/DLZ) has one concrete runway. It is served by regular domestic flights from and to Ulaanbaatar.

== Administrative subdivisions ==
The Sums of Ömnögovi Aimag
Sum	Mongolian	Population (1994)	Population (2003)	Population (2005)	Population (2009)	Sum centre population	Area (km^{2})	Density (/km^{2})
Bayan-Ovoo	Баян-Овоо	1,577	1,569	1,539	1,574	544	10,474	0.15
Bayandalai	Баяндалай	2,125	2,360	2,338	2,316	651	10,751	0.22
Bulgan	Булган	2,421	2,433	2,430	2,395	929	7,498	0.32
Dalanzadgad	Даланзадгад	12,391	15,308	15,954	17,946	16,856	476	37.70
Gurvan tes	Гурван тэс	2,983	3,376	3,524	4,034	1,842	27,967	0.14
Khanbogd	Ханбогд	2,161	2,451	2,659	3,154	1,361	15,151	0.21
Khan khongor	Хан хонгор	2,559	2,931	2,542	2,376	616	9,931	0.24
Khürmen	Хүрмэн	1,968	1,951	1,910	1,796	495	12,393	0.14
Mandal-Ovoo	Мандал-Овоо	2,345	2,166	2,004	1,954	603	6,433	0.30
Manlai	Манлай	2,215	2,422	2,431	2,450	608	12,418	0.20
Nomgon	Номгон	2,608	3,045	3,009	2,869	787	19,468	0.15
Noyon	Ноён	1,417	1,468	1,390	1,318	401	10,550	0.12
Sevrei	Сэврэй	2,216	2,423	2,309	2,191	709	8,095	0.27
Tsogt-Ovoo	Цогт-Овоо	1,863	1,761	1,672	1,666	619	6,526	0.26
Tsogttsetsii	Цогтцэций	1,990	2,130	2,155	2,642	1,043	7,246	0.36

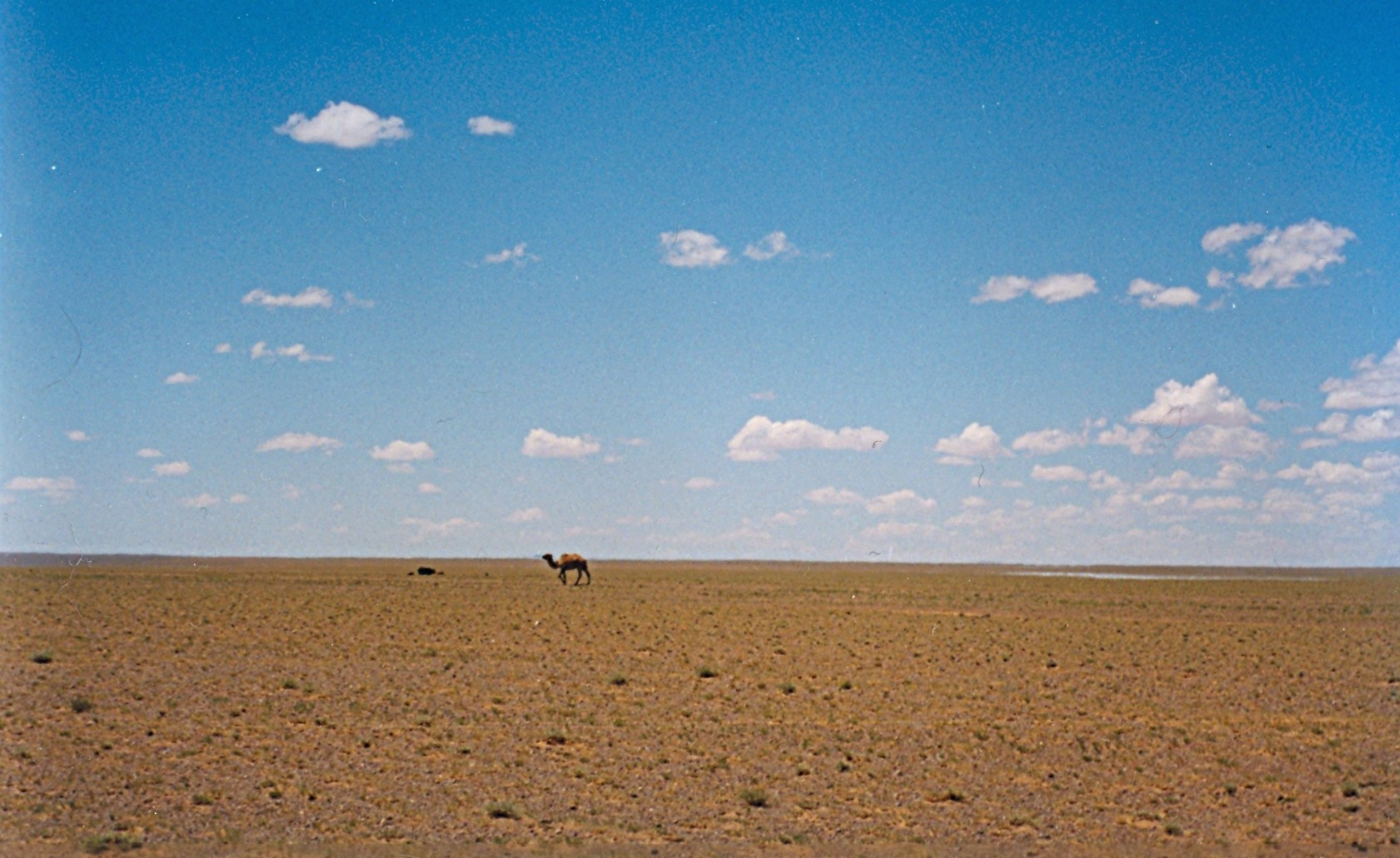
Landscape in Ömnögovi Aimag

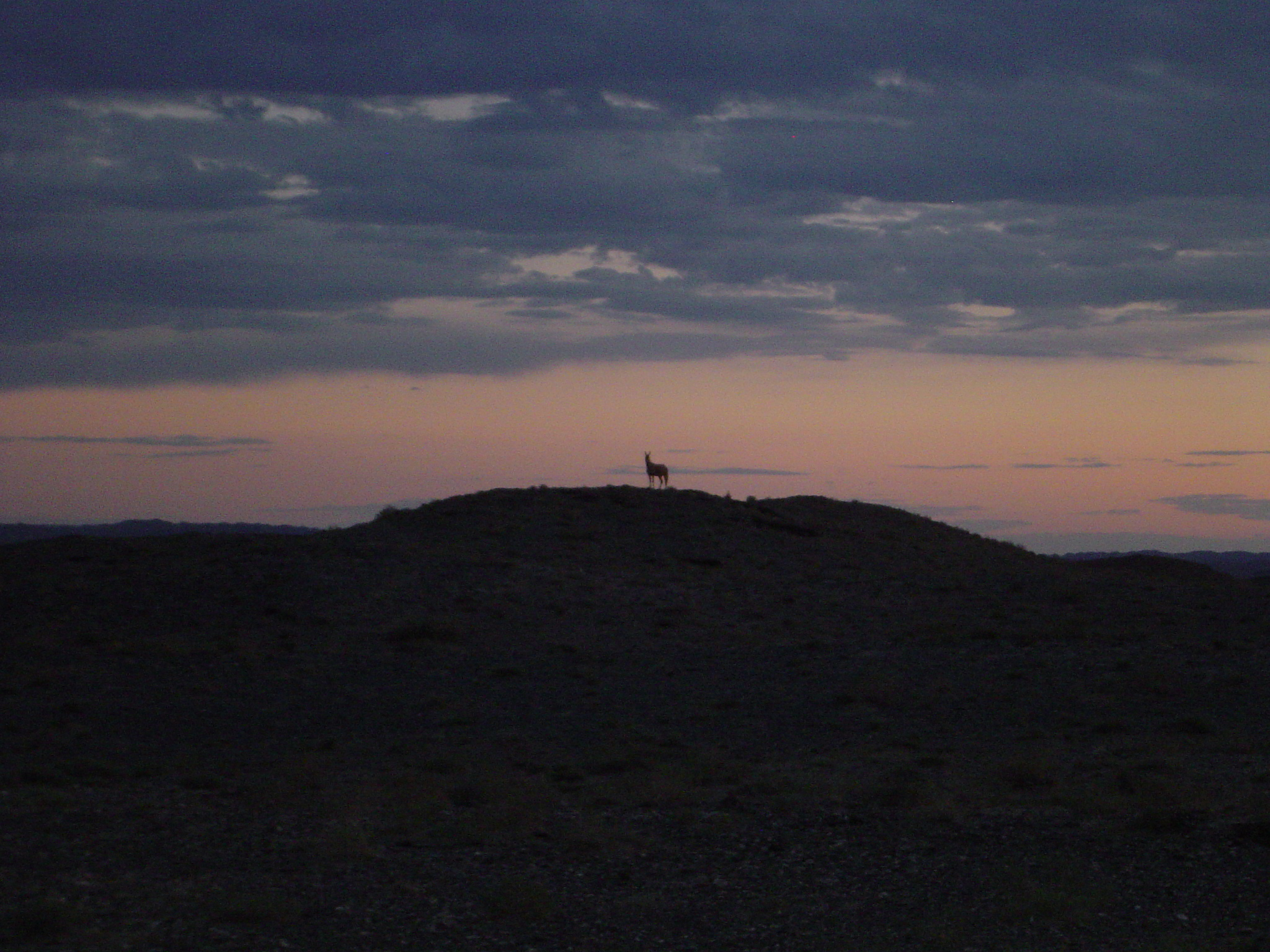
A Khulan (Mongolian Wild Ass) on a hill in the Gobi of the Ömnögovi, at sunset.

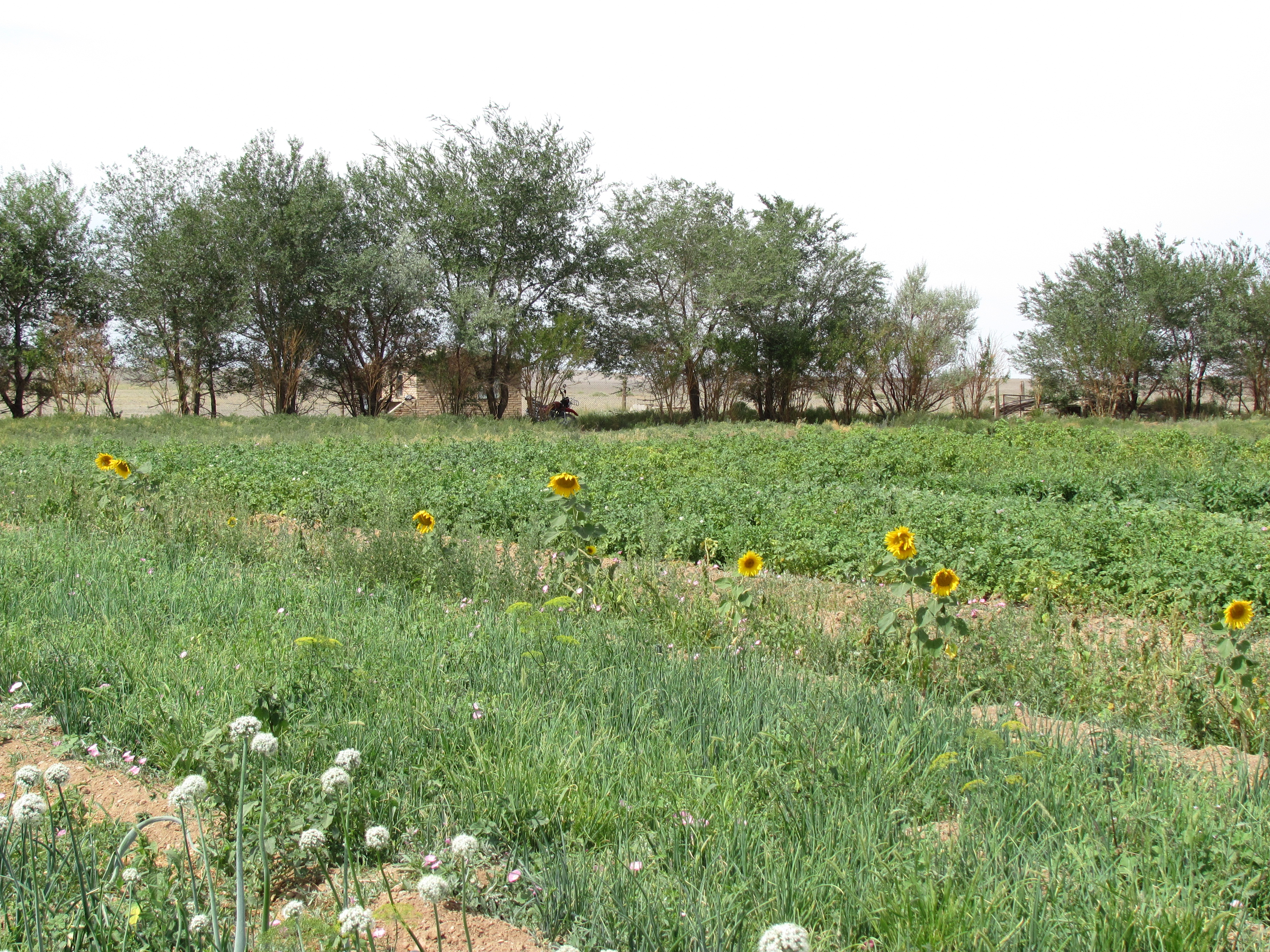
Growing vegetables in oasis Dal.

== Religion ==
Religion in Ömnögovi (2009)
1. Buddhism (73.5%)
2. Christianity (2.90%)
3. No formal religion (23.3%)
4. Other (0.30%)

According to a 2009 survey, 73.5% of the residents of Ömnögovi are Buddhists, 2.9% are Christians, 23.3% do not identify with a formal religion, and 0.3% adhere to other formal religions.

== Economy ==
In 2018, the province contributed to 1.86% of the total national GDP of Mongolia.
