= Khanbumbat Airport =

Airport in Khanbogd, Ömnögovi, Mongolia

Umnugobi Khanbumbat Airport Ханбумбат нисэх буудал

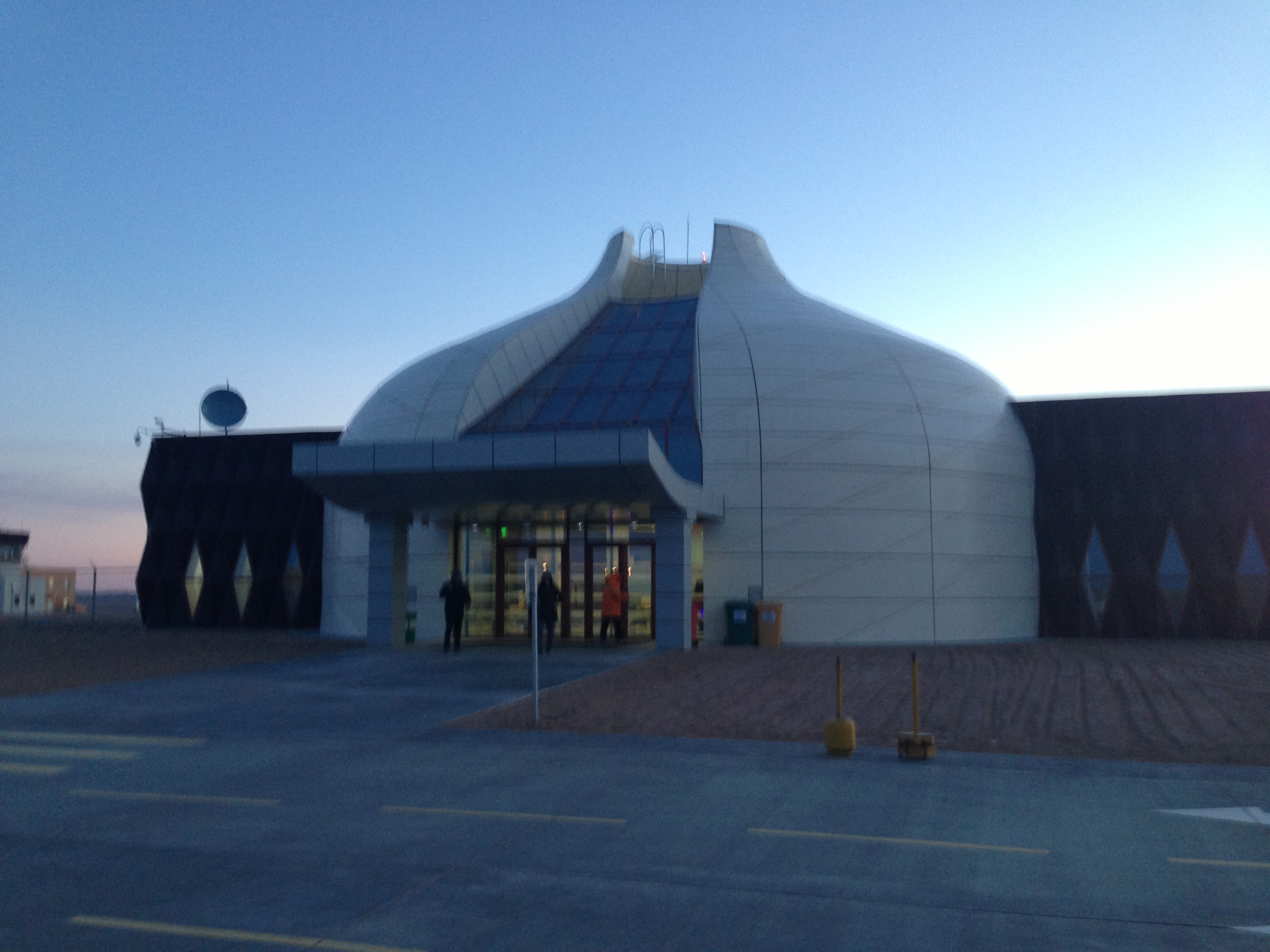
- IATA: none; ICAO: ZMKB

Summary
- Airport type: Public
- Owner: Oyu Tolgoi LLC
- Operator: ACH Services LLC
- Serves: Khanbogd
- Location: Khanbogd, Ömnögovi, Mongolia
- Elevation AMSL: 1,196 m (3,924 ft)
- Coordinates: 43°08′05″N 106°50′47″E
- Website: http://ot.mn/

Map
- Location within Mongolia ZMKB (Asia) ZMKB (Earth)

Runways
Direction	Length		Surface
Direction	m	ft	Surface
16/34	3,250	10,663	Concrete PCN 57/R/B/W/T

Statistics (2014)
- Passengers: 57,597
- Sources: Civil Aviation Administration of Mongolia and the MCAA

Khanbumbat Airport
- Simplified Chinese: 汗布巴特机场
Transcriptions

Khanbumbat Airport (Mongolian: Ханбумбат нисэх буудал, romanized: Hanbumbat niseh buudal, [ˈχamb̥omb̥əʰt]), also Oyu Tolgoi Airport, is an airport in Khanbogd, Ömnögovi, Mongolia. The airport's construction was funded by the adjacent Oyu Tolgoi mine. It is the second airport in passenger traffic in Mongolia after Chinggis Khaan International Airport. The airport serves nearly 100,000 passengers annually.

== History ==
=== Oyu Tolgoi mine exploration ===
Canadian-based Ivanhoe Mines discovered the gold-copper ore deposit in 2001 in the Gobi Desert of Mongolia. It is in an area known as Oyu Tolgoi (Mongolian for Turquoise Hill), where in the time of Genghis Khan outcropping rocks were smelted for copper. By 2003 there were 18 exploration drill rigs on the property employing approximately 200 people, and Oyu Tolgoi was the "biggest mining exploration project in the world." In January 2013 Oyu Tolgoi started producing concentrate from the mine.

=== Airport history ===
The old building of the airport was built in the 2000s. In 2004 the airport was called "Oyut Airport". The runway was dirt. In 2007 it started accepting passenger flights. The new airport was built in 2012. It opened on 10 February 2013.

== Information ==
=== Description ===
The Khanbumbat Airport and Oyu Tolgoi mine are in the South Gobi Desert of Mongolia, 80 kilometres (50 mi) north of Mongolia's border with the People's Republic of China, where the mined copper is expected to be shipped. Oyu Tolgoi deposits contain (as of 2010) an estimated 79 billion pounds (35,833,000 tonnes) of copper, and 45 million ounces (1,275,000,000 grams) of gold. Production was scheduled to begin in 2013 and to reach full capacity in 2018. Over the anticipated lifespan of the mine (45 years), Oyu Tolgoi is scheduled to produce 450,000 tonnes (500,000 short tons) of copper per year, an amount equal to 3% of global production. Oyu Tolgoi is also expected to produce 330,000 ounces of gold annually. Rio Tinto intends to employ 3,000-4,000 people from Mongolia, so a new airport was needed. Khanbumbat Airport is located 205 kilometers east-south-east of the regional capital of the Dalanzadgad, and 522 kilometers south of the national capital of Ulaanbaatar.

=== Runways and operational infrastructure ===
The airport of international standards, its runway has a length of 3259 m, and a width of 45 meters. It is able to receive Boeing-737 and Airbus A320 aircraft.

The terminal building (designed to mimick a Mongolian ger) is able to cater for up to 240 passengers per hour.

In 2013, 80,000 passengers arrived at the airport. The majority were employees of the Oyu Tolgoi mine from Ulaanbaatar, including foreigners who connected through Buyant-Ukhaa International Airport. In the future it is possible to open international flights directly to Khanbumbat.

== Gallery ==
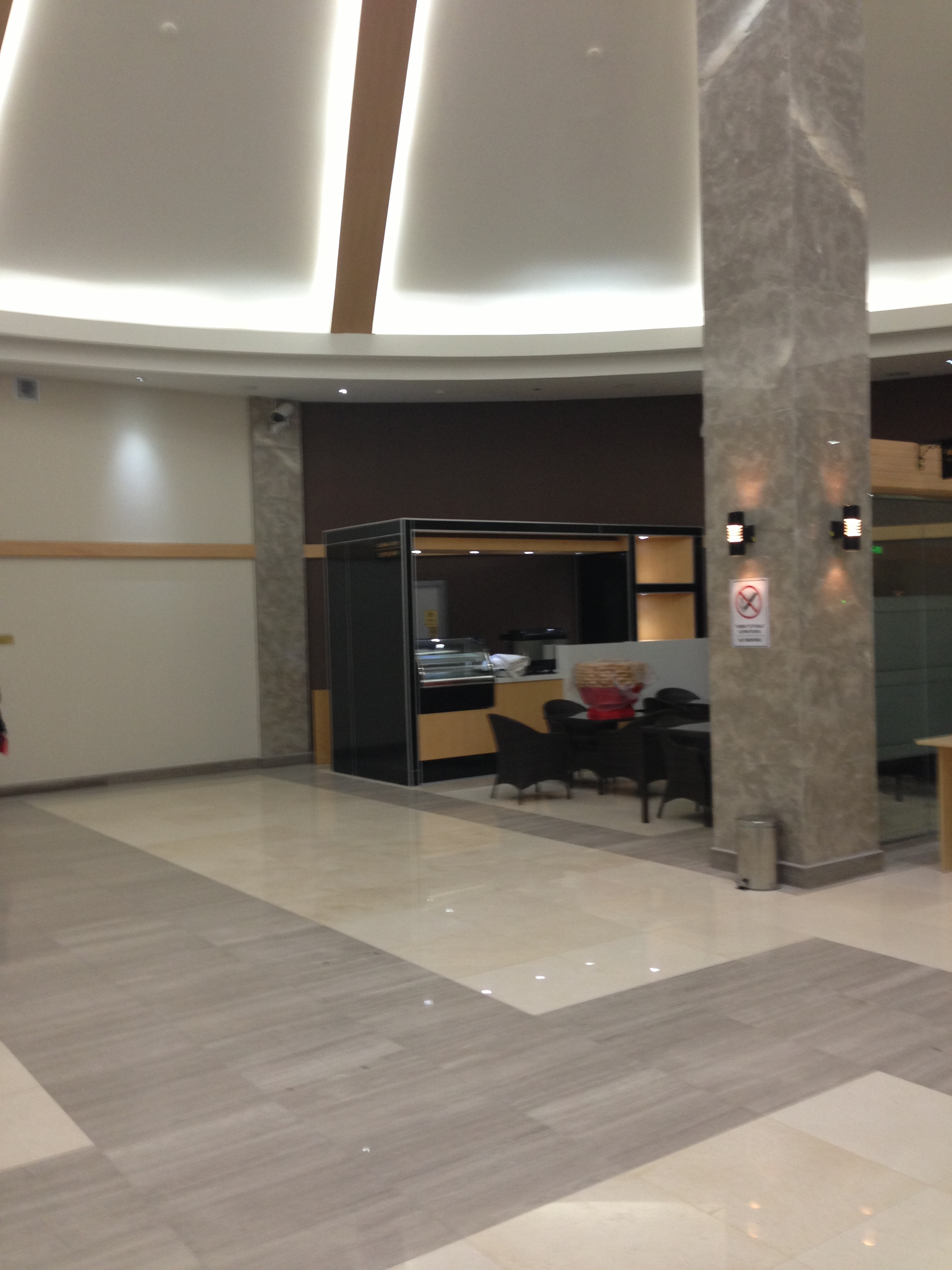
Coffee shop inside the airport

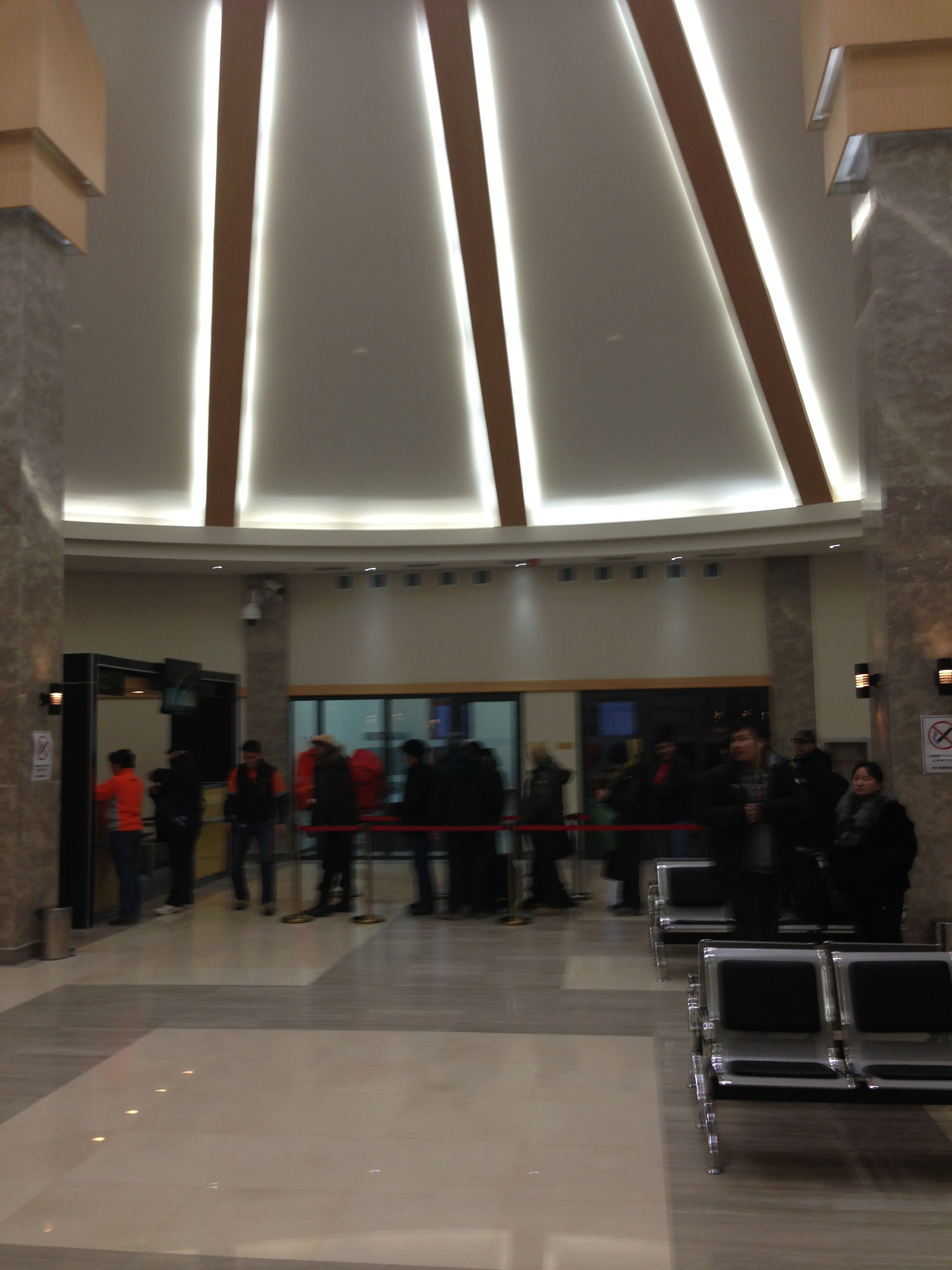
Airport security

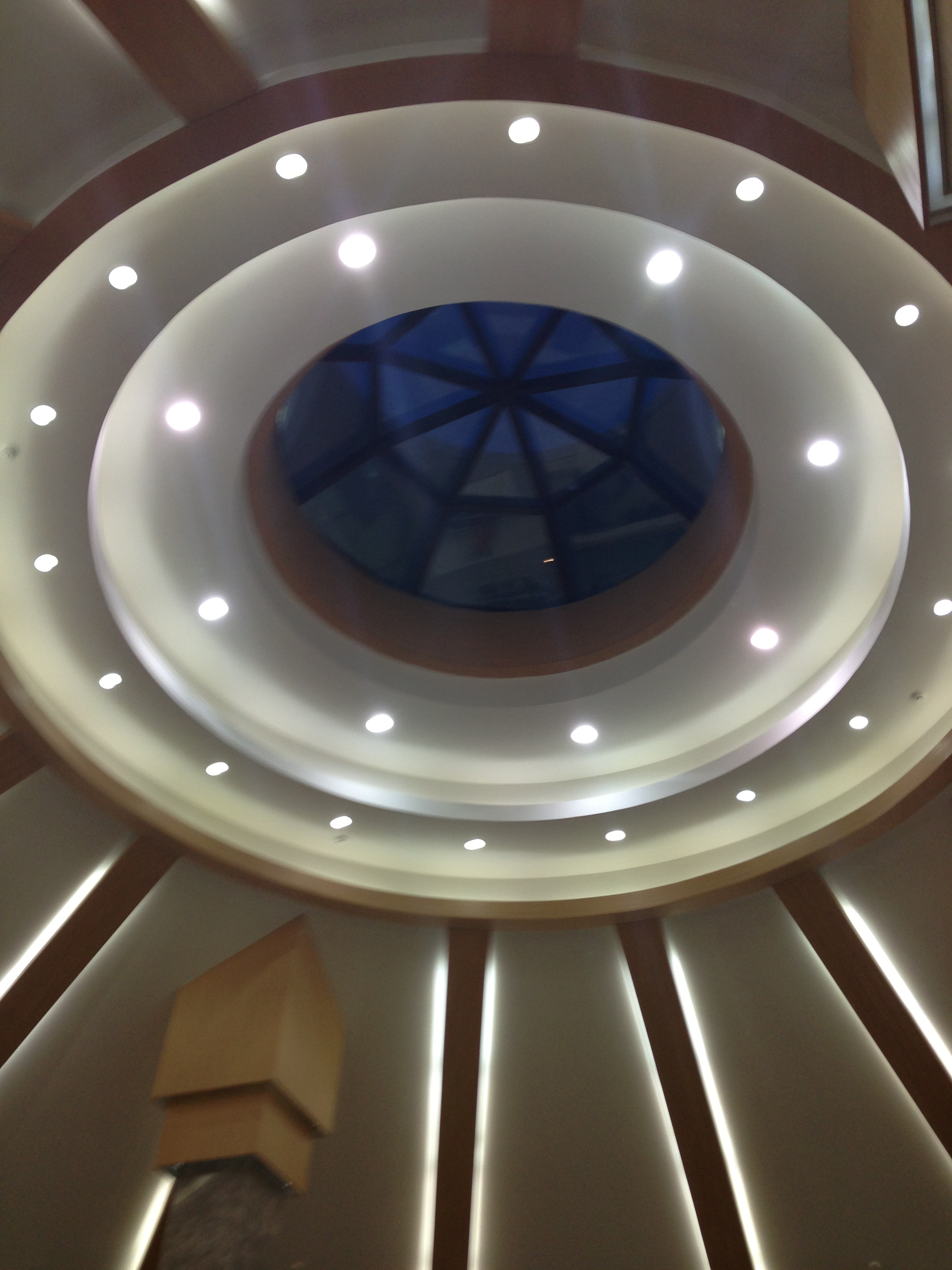
Airport ceiling

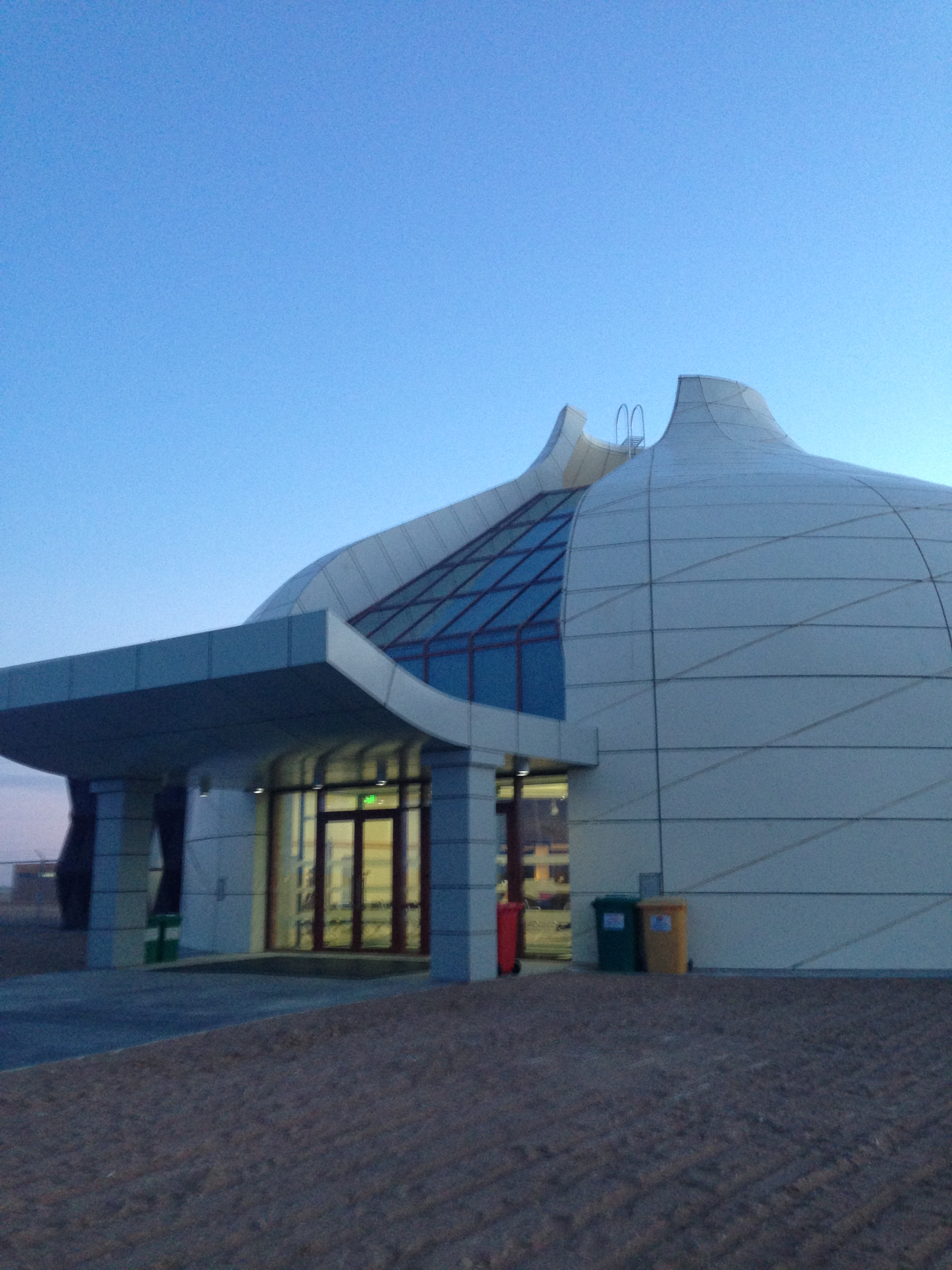
Outside view of the airport

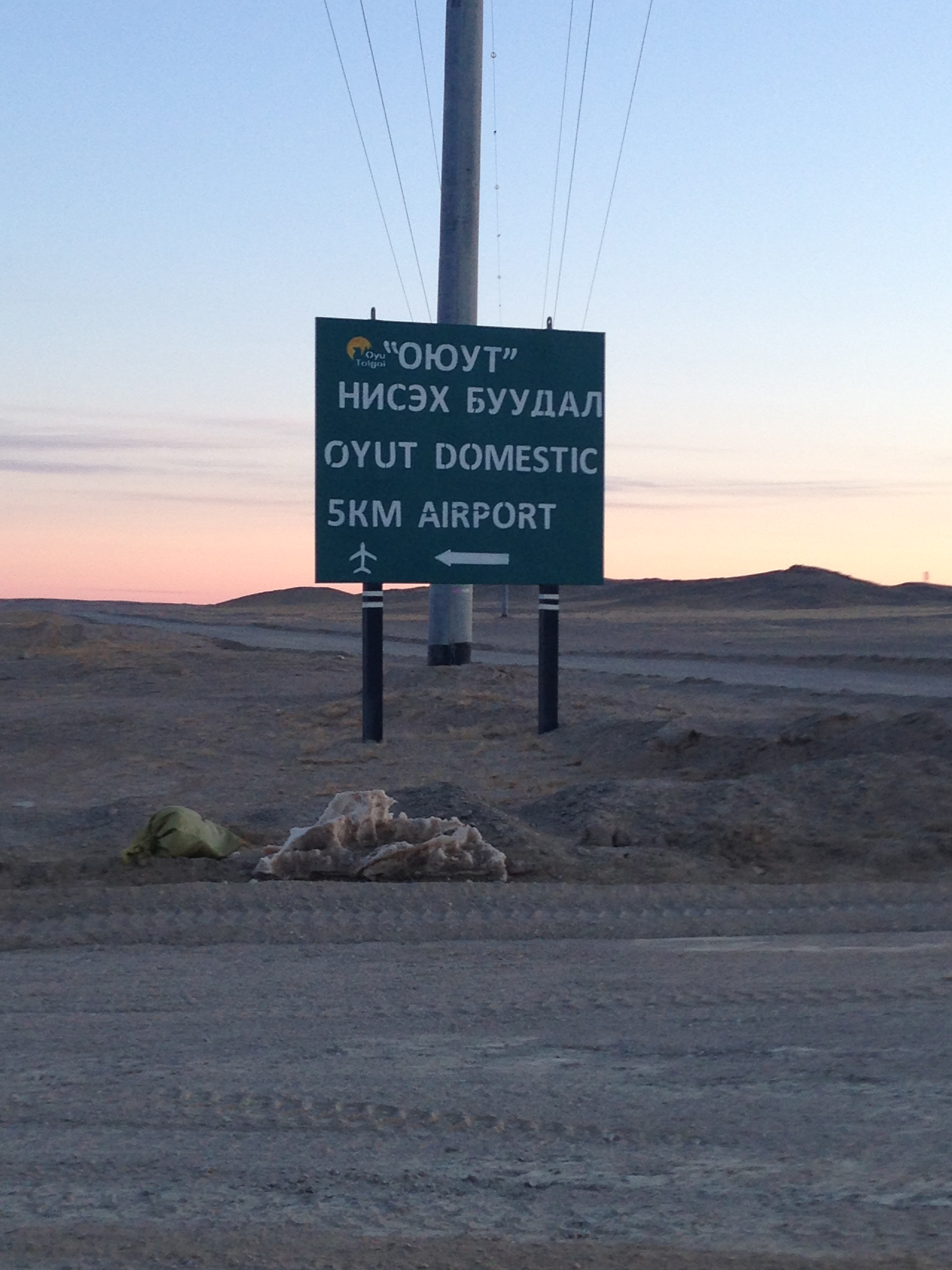
Airport direction sign

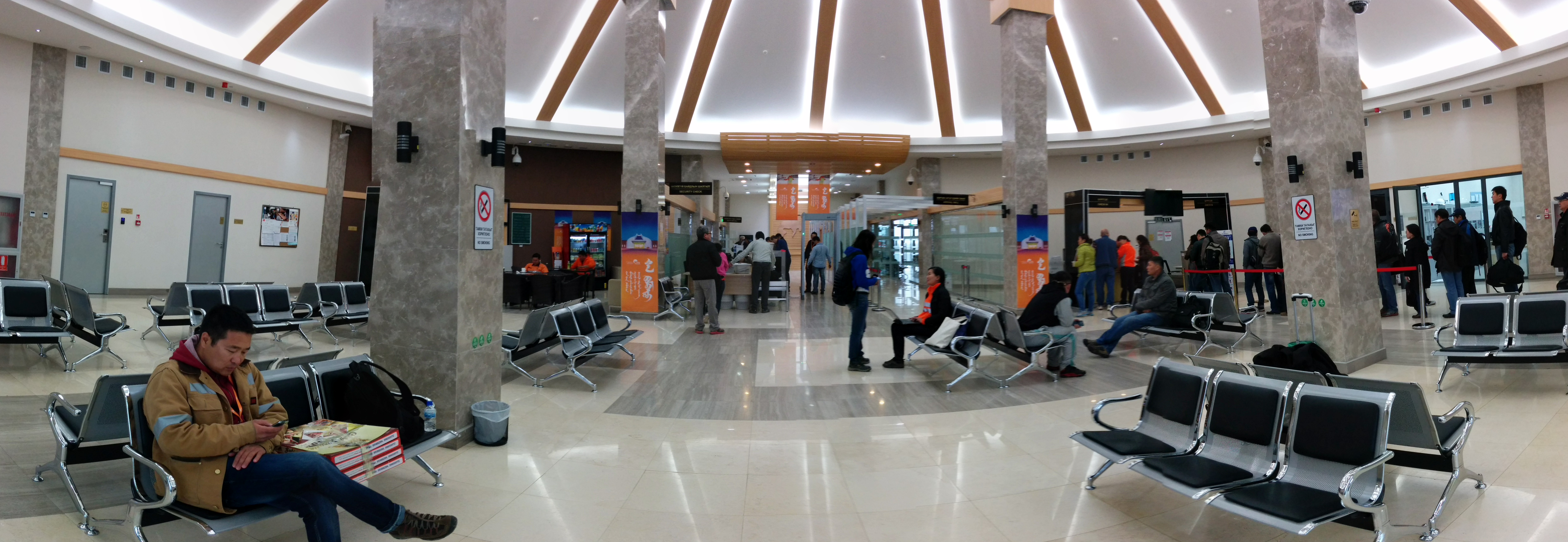
Airport interior

== See also ==
- List of airports in Mongolia
- New Ulaanbaatar International Airport
- Tavan Tolgoi
