= Copper mining in Mongolia =

In Mongolia, copper mining is a major industry and source of income for the country. There are only two companies that produce copper concentrate, Erdenet Mining Corporation, a Mongolian-Russian joint venture, and the Oyu Tolgoi mine, a joint venture between Rio Tinto Group, Turquoise Hill Resources, and the Government of Mongolia. Until 2010 copper was Mongolia's largest export.

== Reserves ==
Mongolia is ranked 12th in the world for copper reserves. The south Gobi Desert alone has an estimated 35 million tonnes of copper.

== Operations ==
=== Erdenet ===
Erdenet has been operation since 1978 as a joint project between Mongolia and Russia. The mine produced copper concentrate with molybdenum. Over the years the output of grade copper decreased with increasing depth of the mine. This was proposed to be compensated by manufacturing copper cathode which was priced higher. The estimated ore reserve was 1.54 billion tons. The copper concentrate production rate of 130,000 tons was envisaged by Erdent.

As of 2012 Erdenet was still Mongolia's sole producer of copper, and accounted for 14% of Mongolia's gross domestic product (GDP) in 2007. Copper from Erdenet was Mongolia's largest export until 2010 until it was bypassed by coal. While the mine has been exporting copper concentrate since production began, there are plans to create industry within the country to manufacture finished products (such as copper wire) from concentrate from the mine.

=== Oyu Tolgoi ===
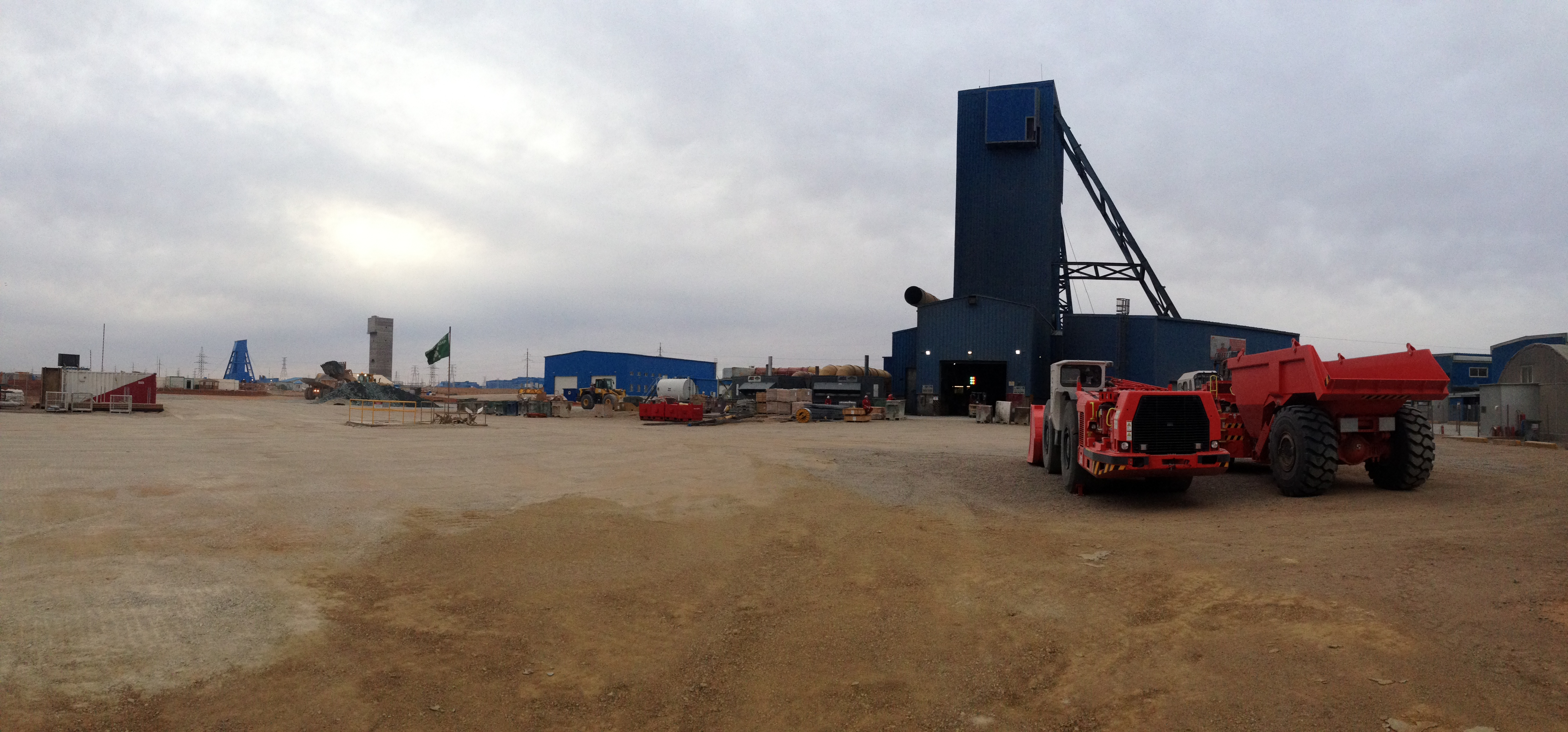
From right to left, Shaft #1, #2, and #5 at Oyu Tolgoi

In 2001 Canadian-based Ivanhoe Mines (now known as Turquoise Hill Resources) discovered the gold-copper ore deposit of what would be developed into the Oyu Tolgoi mine. The deposit is in the Gobi Desert in an area known as Oyu Tolgoi (Mongolian for Turquoise Hill), where in the time of Genghis Khan outcropping rocks were smelted for copper. By 2003 there were 18 exploration drill rigs on the property employing approximately 200 people, and Oyu Tolgoi was the "biggest mining exploration project in the world." In January 2013 Oyu Tolgoi started producing concentrate from the mine. Its location in the South Gobi province, is 80 kilometres (50 miles) from the border with China and is termed as a mega mine in Mongolia. Its mining operations are a joint venture of Rio Tinto (a UK-based mining transnational), Turquoise Hill and the Mongolian government. As of 2010, the estimated cost of bringing the Oyu Tolgoi mine into production was US$4.6 billion, making it (financially) the largest project in Mongolian history; however, by 2013 costs had increased to $10 billion. When in production Oyu Tolgoi will account for more than 30% of Mongolia's GDP. The copper production from this mine (the investment was reported to be of the order of US$5 billion) has been projected at 450,000 tonnes of copper for the next 50 years; the mining reserves are reported to extend up to 32 km (20 mi) beneath the Gobi Desert and is also estimated to yield 10,000 kilograms (330,000 troy ounces) of gold annually. In January 2013 Oyu Tolgoi started producing concentrate from the mine.
