= Ulaanbaatar Airport (disambiguation) =

Ulaanbaatar Airport may refer to:

- Buyant-Ukhaa International Airport, a semi-operational airport whose services have largely been replaced by the newer airport listed below.
- Chinggis Khaan International Airport, the primary airport for Ulaanbaatar and its metropolitan area.
