= Khanbogd, Ömnögovi =

District in Ömnögovi Province, Mongolia

Coordinates: 43°11′45″N 107°11′57″E

Khanbogd District Ханбогд сум ᠬᠠᠨᠪᠣᠭᠳᠤᠰᠤᠮᠤ
- District
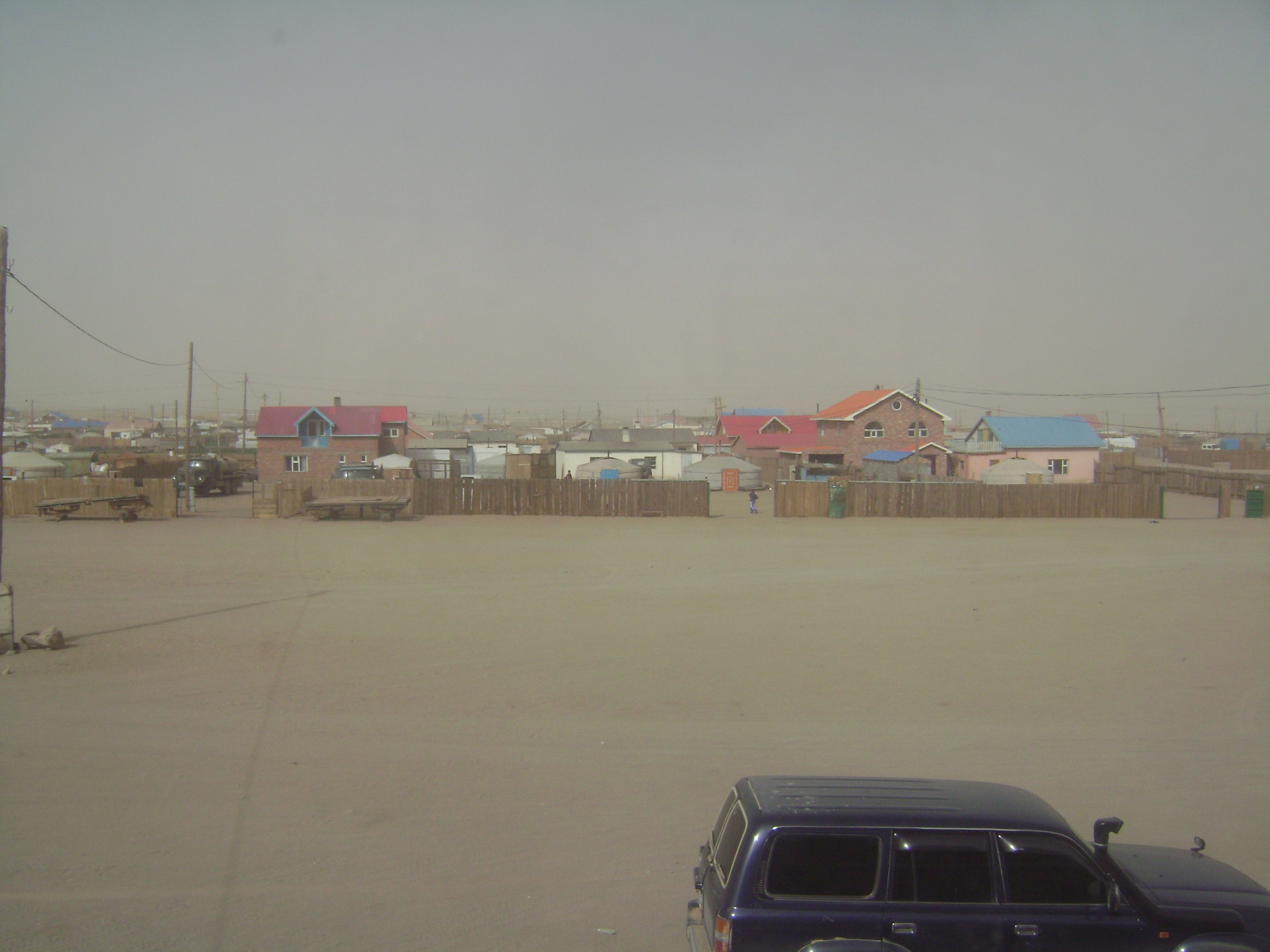

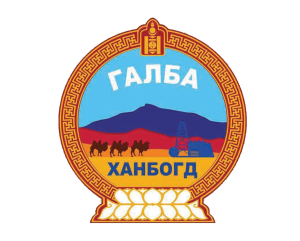
- Seal

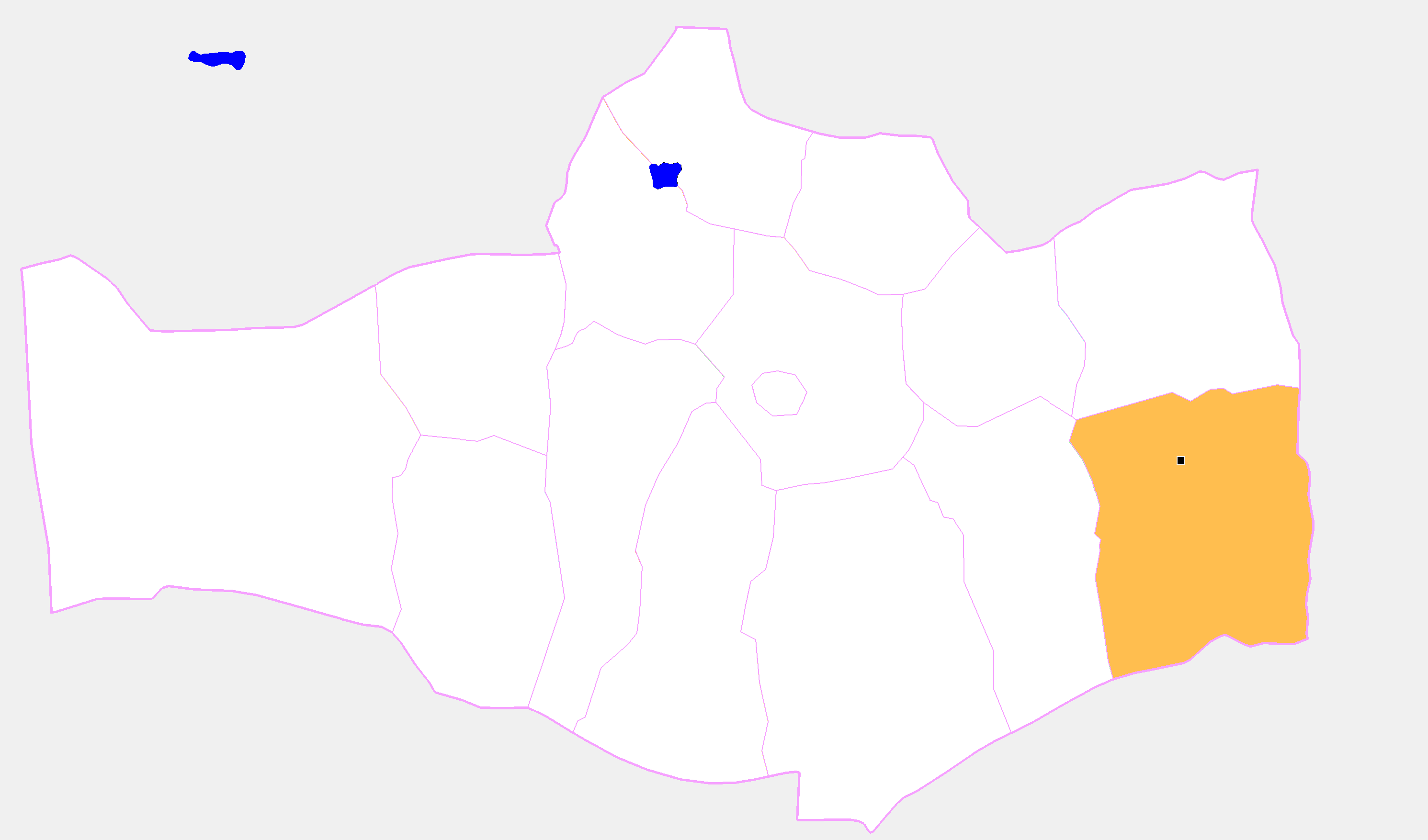
- Khanbogd District in Ömnögovi Province
- Country: Mongolia
- Province: Ömnögovi Province

Area
  - Total: 15,151 km^{2} (5,850 sq mi)
- Time zone: UTC+8 (UTC + 8)

Khanbogd (Mongolian: Ханбогд, romanized: Hanbogd, pronounced [ˌχam‿ˈpɔɢə̆t] "majestic blessed") is a sum (district) of Ömnögovi Province in southern Mongolia. Khanbogd is the site of the Oyu Tolgoi mine, which is 40 kilometres (25 mi) from the sum centre. In 2009, its population was 3,154.

Khanbogd is also home to Demchigiin Khiid (Mongolian: Дэмчигййн Хийдийн), a monastery built by Danzan Ravjaa. The monastery was destroyed in 1937, but has since been rebuilt by funds from the company that operates the Oyu Tolgoi mine.

The Khanbumbat Airport, located in Khanbogd, opened in February 2013.

== Climate ==
Khanbogd has a cold desert climate (Köppen BWk).

Climate data for Khanbogd, 1981–2010
Month	Jan	Feb	Mar	Apr	May	Jun	Jul	Aug	Sep	Oct	Nov	Dec	Year
Mean daily maximum °C (°F)	−5.7 (21.7)	−0.8 (30.6)	6.8 (44.2)	16.1 (61.0)	23.6 (74.5)	29.0 (84.2)	31.3 (88.3)	28.7 (83.7)	23.1 (73.6)	14.4 (57.9)	3.8 (38.8)	−3.8 (25.2)	13.9 (57.0)
Mean daily minimum °C (°F)	−16.2 (2.8)	−12.9 (8.8)	−6.5 (20.3)	2.7 (36.9)	10.1 (50.2)	15.8 (60.4)	18.8 (65.8)	16.8 (62.2)	10.8 (51.4)	2.4 (36.3)	−7.0 (19.4)	−13.7 (7.3)	1.8 (35.2)
Average precipitation mm (inches)	1.4 (0.06)	1.6 (0.06)	3.6 (0.14)	4.1 (0.16)	9.0 (0.35)	13.2 (0.52)	24.4 (0.96)	27.5 (1.08)	9.2 (0.36)	4.1 (0.16)	2.2 (0.09)	1.0 (0.04)	101.3 (3.98)
Average precipitation days	2.0	2.5	2.8	2.8	3.5	5.8	7.9	8.0	3.6	2.3	2.4	2.1	45.7
Source: World Meteorological Organization

== Administrative divisions ==
The district is divided into five bags, which are:

- Bayan
- Gaviluud
- Javkhlant
- Khairkhan
- Nomgon
