= Air Accident Investigation Bureau (Mongolia) =

Government agency of Mongolia

The Air Accident Investigation Bureau (AAIB; Mongolian: Нислэг техникийн осол, зөрчлийг шинжлэн шалгах алба) is an agency of the government of Mongolia. Its head office is on the grounds of Chinggis Khaan International Airport in Ulaanbaatar.
