= Oyu Tolgoi mine =

Gold and copper mine in southern Mongolia

Oyu Tolgoi
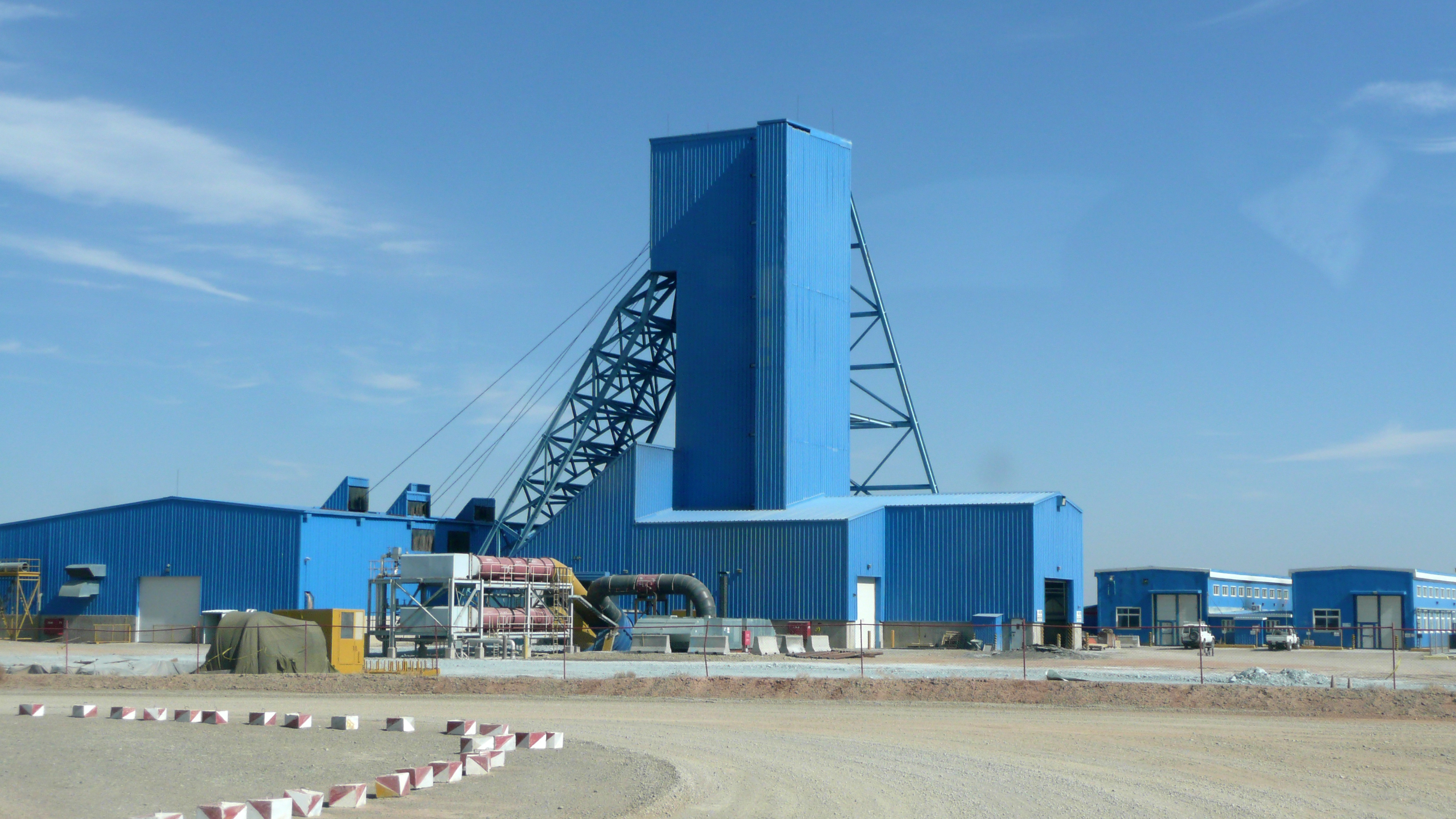
- Shaft 1 at Oyu Tolgoi

- Location in Mongolia
- Location: Khanbogd, Ömnögovi, Mongolia; 43°00′30″N 106°50′35″E
- Products: Gold, Copper
- Company: Oyu Tolgoi LLC
- Website: www.ot.mn

The Oyu Tolgoi mine, also Oyuutolgoi (Mongolian: Оюутолгой, pronounced [ɔˌjʊˑtʰɔɮˈɢœˑ]; lit. "Turquoise Hill"), is a combined open pit and underground mining project in Khanbogd sum within the south Gobi Desert of Mongolia, approximately 235 kilometres (146 mi) east of the Ömnögovi Province capital Dalanzadgad. The site was discovered in 2001 and is being developed as a joint venture between Turquoise Hill Resources (a majority owned subsidiary of Rio Tinto) with 66% ownership and the Government of Mongolia with 34%. The mine began construction as of 2010 and shipped its first batch of copper on 9 July 2013.

The Oyu Tolgoi mining project is the largest financial undertaking in Mongolia's history and is expected upon completion to produce 450,000 tonnes (500,000 short tons) of copper annually. Financing for the project has come in part from the Rio Tinto Group and an investment agreement between Ivanhoe Mines and the government of Mongolia.

== History ==
In 2001, Canadian-based Ivanhoe Mines estimated the resource gold-copper ore deposit in the Gobi Desert of Mongolia, which Soviets had discovered officially before 1990. It is in an area known as Oyu Tolgoi (Mongolian for Turquoise Hill), where in the time of Genghis Khan outcropping rocks were smelted for copper. The place was suspected to have mineralization by Mongolian geologists since the 1950s. By 2003 there were 18 exploration drill rigs on the property employing approximately 200 people, and Oyu Tolgoi was the "biggest mining exploration project in the world." In January 2013 Oyu Tolgoi started producing concentrate from the mine.

Following a parliamentary resolution in 2021 on increasing benefits from the deposit, "Rio Tinto reached an agreement with the government in January [2022] to move the joint Oyu Tolgoi copper and gold project forward and resolve outstanding issues", per Mongolia Weekly. In November 2025, Oyu Tolgoi LLC appointed Sukhbaataryn Munkhsukh as its first Mongolian CEO. In June 2026, protestors blocked copper exports from the mine for almost a day. Later in June, Rio Tinto and the government agreed new financial terms for the mine, following months of negotiation.

== Description ==
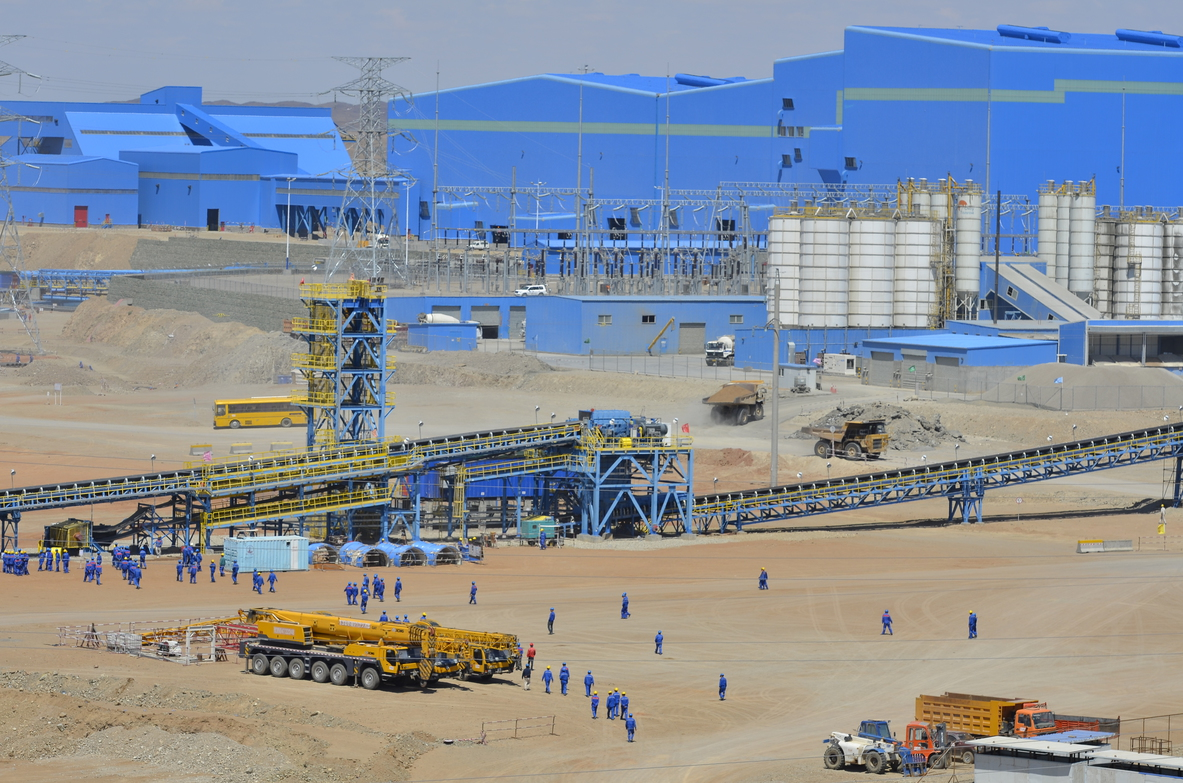
Oyutolgoi field

The Oyu Tolgoi mine is in the South Gobi Desert of Mongolia, 80 kilometres (50 mi) north of Mongolia's border with the People's Republic of China, where the mined copper is expected to be shipped. Oyu Tolgoi deposits contain an estimated 2.7 million tonnes of copper and 1.7 million ounces (48,000 kg) of gold. It also contains 1,900 tonnes of silver and 205,000 tonnes of molybdenum. Production began in 2013 and is scheduled to reach full capacity in 2021. Over the anticipated lifespan of the mine (>50 years), Oyu Tolgoi is scheduled to produce 430,000 tonnes (470,000 short tons) of copper per year, an amount equal to 3% of global production. Oyu Tolgoi is also expected to produce 425,000 ounces (12,000 kg) of gold annually, with "by-product silver and molybdenum". Rio Tinto intends to employ 3,000–4,000 people from Mongolia.

== Geology ==
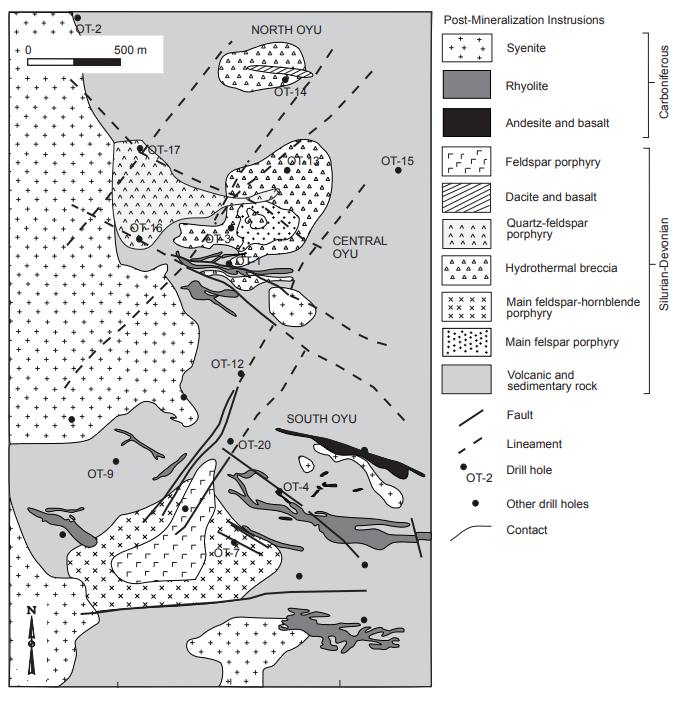
Oyu Tolgoi copper porphyry geological map

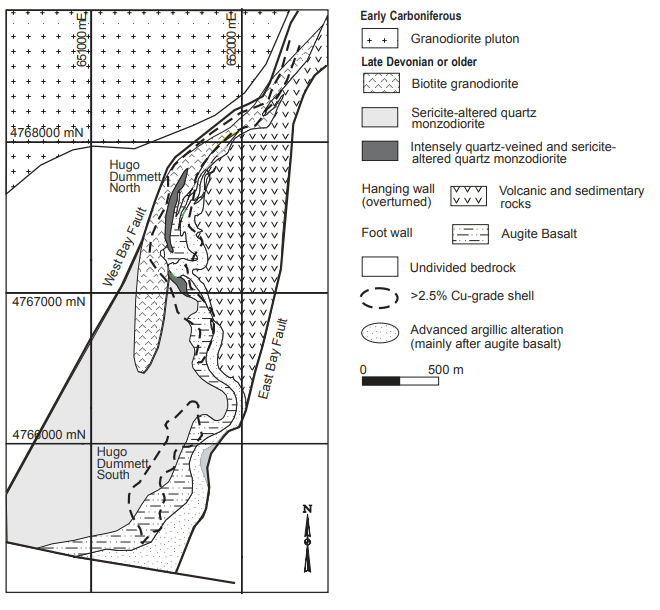
Hugo Dummett northern Oyu Tolgoi geological map

The deposits are Late Devonian quartz monzodiorite igneous intrusions, and include the Southwest Oyu, South Oyu, Central Oyu, Hugo Dummett, and Heruga gold and porphyry copper deposits. The central portion of the deposit consists of hydrothermal breccia that crosscuts a feldspar porphyry. The regional geology consists of middle to late Paleozoic Gurvansaihan island arc terrane.

== Mining and milling ==
Oyu Tolgoi will use both underground and open pit mining techniques. Initially the mine will process 70,000 tonnes of rock per day, ramping up to 85,000 tonnes from both the open pit and the underground mine (underground mining is to be done by block caving). The yield from the first phase of mining will be ground through one semi-autogenous grinding mill (SAG mill). Expansion to new underground areas will result in an additional increase of up to 140,000 tonnes per day with a possible increase to 170,000 tonnes per day. To move overburden, the mine uses 8 battery swapping trucks at 91 tonnes each.

== Financing ==
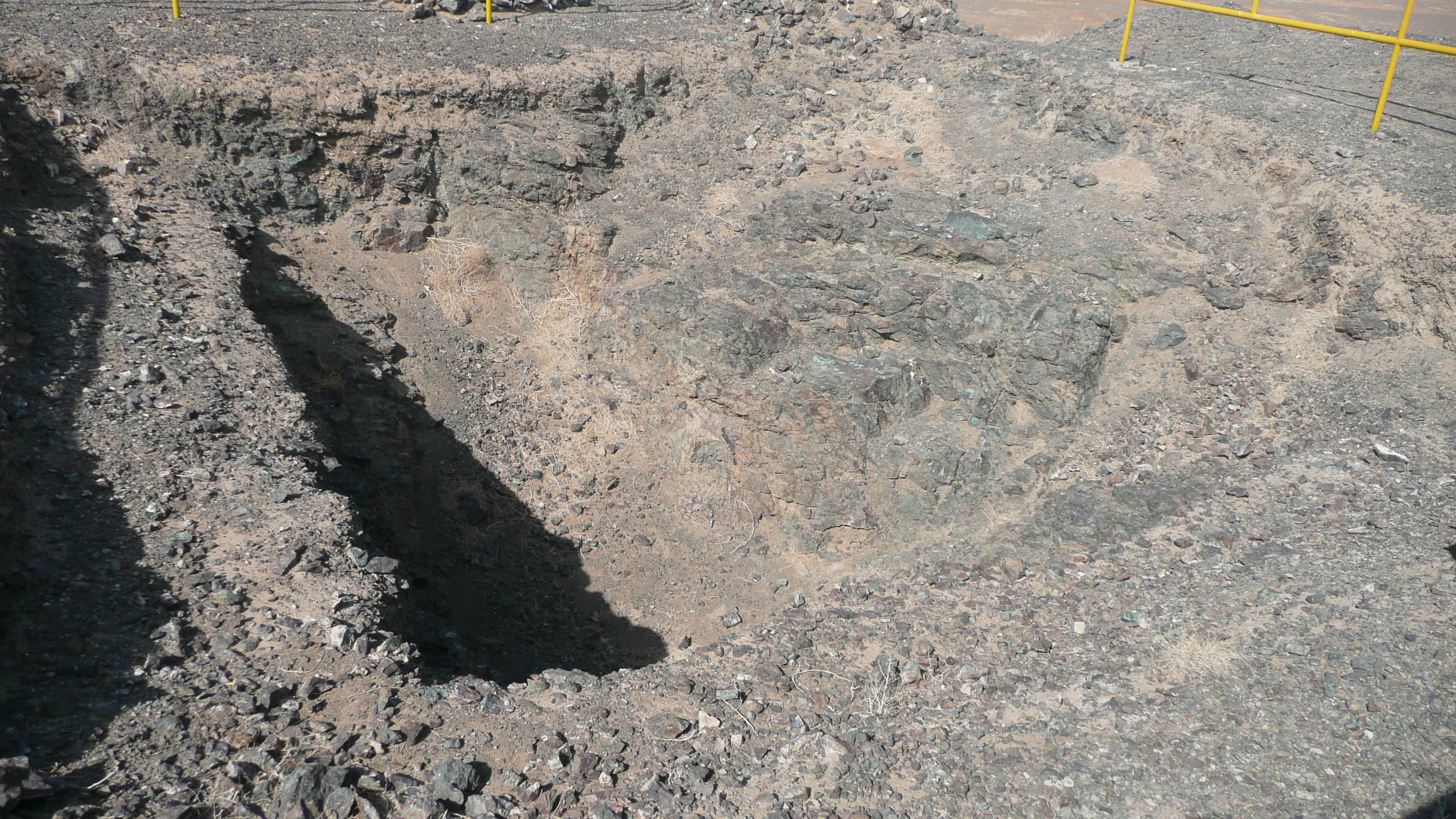
The original discovery site of the Oyu Tolgoi deposit

As of 2010, the estimated cost of bringing the Oyu Tolgoi mine into production was US$4.6 billion, making it (financially) the largest project in Mongolian history; however, by 2013 costs had ballooned to $10 billion, which caused some concern for the Government of Mongolia, which borrows its 34 per cent share of investment from foreign investors with interest. The mine is said to account for more than 30% of Mongolia's GDP upon completion. In early 2010 global mining company Rio Tinto owned 22.4% of Oyu Tolgoi owner Ivanhoe Mines (now Turquoise Hill Resources), and gave both technical assistance and financial support to the project. At the time Rio Tinto had the option of increasing their stake to 46.6%. On 31 March 2010 the Government of Mongolia approved an investment agreement where they would purchase 34% of the project. In October 2010, Ivanhoe announced a new US$1 billion share offering in order to raise funds to develop this mine. Rio Tinto increased its ownership of Ivanhoe in December 2010, also assuming direct management of the design and construction of the project, however without fulfilling another aim, to achieve direct ownership of the mine.

Disagreement between the Mongolian government and Rio Tinto came to a head in 2013, with the government urging Rio Tinto to settle the US$340 million tax issue and the cost overruns from the initially planned US$5.1 billion to US$7.1 billion during the initial stage of the project. In July 2013, the shares in Turquoise Hill Resources (Rio Tinto's unit that controls 66% of the mine) dropped 20% after a dispute between Tserenbat Sedvanchig, the executive director of Erdenes Oyu Tolgoi (the state-owned company that controls the other 34%), and Rio Tinto. Sedvanchig was fired in August and replaced by Davaadorj Ganbold, a former deputy minister and member of parliament. In the meantime, Rio Tinto cut 1700 Mongolian employees from the mining operation.

On 21 November 2019, the State Great Khural adopted a resolution on "Ensuring Interests and Rights of Mongolia in the Exploitation of Oyu Tolgoi Deposit, which instructs the government (Cabinet) to look into "a product sharing arrangement" or swap its 34% equity with "a special royalty".

In June 2026, Mongolia and Rio Tinto agreed renegotiated financial terms. Among the changes were a 50% decrease in administrative costs by Rio Tinto and a reduced interest rate on the firm's loan to Mongolia, while the issue of government dividends was unresolved.

In November 2026, Mongolia's president directed that the first dividend expected from Oyu Tolgoi be paid to citizens in cash, and parliament took up a citizen petition with more than 100,000 signatures asking for a law to pay into citizens' own accounts. The dividend, the mines first to the state, is about 3 trillion tugriks (US$833 million) from the government's 34% stake, and under the 2024 wealth fund law, it would otherwise sit in citizens' named accounts, locked until 2030.

== Controversial issues ==
=== Environmental impact ===
Oyu Tolgoi mine is located in one of the driest areas in Mongolia. Rainfall in the desert area ranges between zero and 50 mm per year. It is estimated that the water demand will triple in the coming two decades mainly due to mineral exploitation in the area. Herders worry that Oyu Tolgoi is draining the region's water supply, since it uses more than a billion gallons of water a month. In addition, there is a substantial risk of acid rock drainage from the mine, from tailings storage facilities and from any overburden or waste rock stored on the surface and not deposited back into the mine.

South Gobi is also a critical habitat for at least six endangered and threatened species found nowhere else in the world. Two protected areas are located in close proximity to Oyu Tolgoi and are included in the mine's area of impact. In order to compensate for the loss of habitat, a biodiversity offset strategy has been released, however the NGOs are not convinced. They are stressing that company did not consider avoiding, minimizing or mitigating the damage and went directly to offsetting. They urge the company to develop a strong, detailed, long-term species conservation and habitat protection plan, including a rigorous monitoring strategy. They are of the opinion that the current mitigation strategies described in the ESIA are too general and are not based on empirical data. Consequently, the offset strategy presented by the company can be called into question.

=== Social impact ===
Mongolia's Southern and Central Zones occupy terrain traditionally used by nomadic herdsmen. Diverting already scarce water resources to mining could jeopardize their livelihoods. In the harsh conditions of the Gobi desert, herders have a very specific way of organizing summer pasture and its rotation, access to water, hay collection and hay storage. Any changes to these unique practises hamper the livelihoods of nomads. Steel fence that surrounds the gaping mine blocks traditional herding corridors and makes it difficult for the herd animals to find water. Roads constructed by the mine owners present additional barriers to animals.

Some Mongolian herders forced to resettle because of the Oyu Tolgoi expansion have experienced herd loss. They were forced to move to inferior locations without adequate time to select spots that would protect their animals from harsh winter storms. The minimal assistance provided at the time of resettlement was not sufficient. Furthermore, they were forced to accept inadequate compensation based on their location in proximity to the mine, rather than the size of pasture taken away from them.

=== Economic impact ===
Mining in Mongolia currently contributes about a third of GDP and accounts for 89.2 per cent of the country's total exports. The numbers are expected to rise since government issued about 3,000 new mining licences. Building an economy on minerals puts country at risk of Dutch disease, or the relationship between the increase in the economic development of natural resources and a decline in the manufacturing sector or agriculture. Cashmere industry and agricultural sector are already feeling the side effects. Although Mongolia’s economic growth has helped to reduce poverty by more than 11 % in recent years, there is also a rising inequality in terms of income distribution. Poverty is higher in the rural areas (35.5%) compared to the urban areas (23.2%), as herders in the countryside struggle to survive as their traditional livelihood dissolves.

=== Corruption related issues ===
Gantömöriin Uyanga, an MP has announced that former PM Sanjaagiin Bayar, who signed the OT Investment Agreement with 3 of its Cabinet Members, owns 7 properties abroad on the names of his daughters, ex-wife, and girlfriend worth of several billion dollars. However, S.Bayar has approached the Independent Agency Against Corruption with request to conduct investigation upon himself. His request reads: "Recently media coverage on possible money laundering through purchase of number of real estates abroad with the sources stating that I, Bayar Sanjaa, have abused my position as Prime Minister and lobbied the approval of the Oyutolgoi Agreement. In matter of these claims I hereby request the Agency to conduct investigations upon me in accordance with the Mongolian legislation". Also Sangijav Bayartsogt, the former Deputy Speaker of Parliament and one of the 3 ministers who signed the OT agreement has had his secret offshore account revealed by "The Guardian", a British Newspaper. According to the report the Deputy Speaker of Parliament, Sangijav Bayartsogt, confirmed having a secret Swiss bank account containing more than one million US dollars, in the name of an offshore entity "Legend Plus Capital Limited". The Guardian reported Bayartsogt Sangajav saying, "I shouldn't have opened that account. I should have included the company in my declarations," to the International Consortium of Investigative Journalists (ICIJ). "I don't worry about my reputation. I worry about my family. I probably should consider resigning from my position."

In January 2022, Rio Tinto reached agreement with the government of Mongolia, that resolves the outstanding issues that have been subject to negotiations with the Government of Mongolia over the last two years in relation to addressing Parliament Resolution 92. The agreement includes a secret clause that Rio Tinto pays $20 million to Erdenes Oyu Tolgoi for “business integrity resolution.” These payments are under investigation by Anti-Corruption NGOs, including Transparency International Mongolia, as deemed highly likely to be bribery payments to senior officials in Mongolian government.
