= Buyant-Ukhaa International Airport =

Semi-operational international airport of Ulaanbaatar, Mongolia

Buyant-Ukhaa International Airport Буянт-Ухаа олон улсын нисэх буудал ᠪᠤᠶᠠᠨᠲᠤ ᠬᠤᠸᠠ ᠣᠯᠠᠨ ᠤᠯᠤᠰ ᠦᠨ ᠨᠢᠰᠬᠦ ᠪᠠᠭᠤᠳᠠᠯ

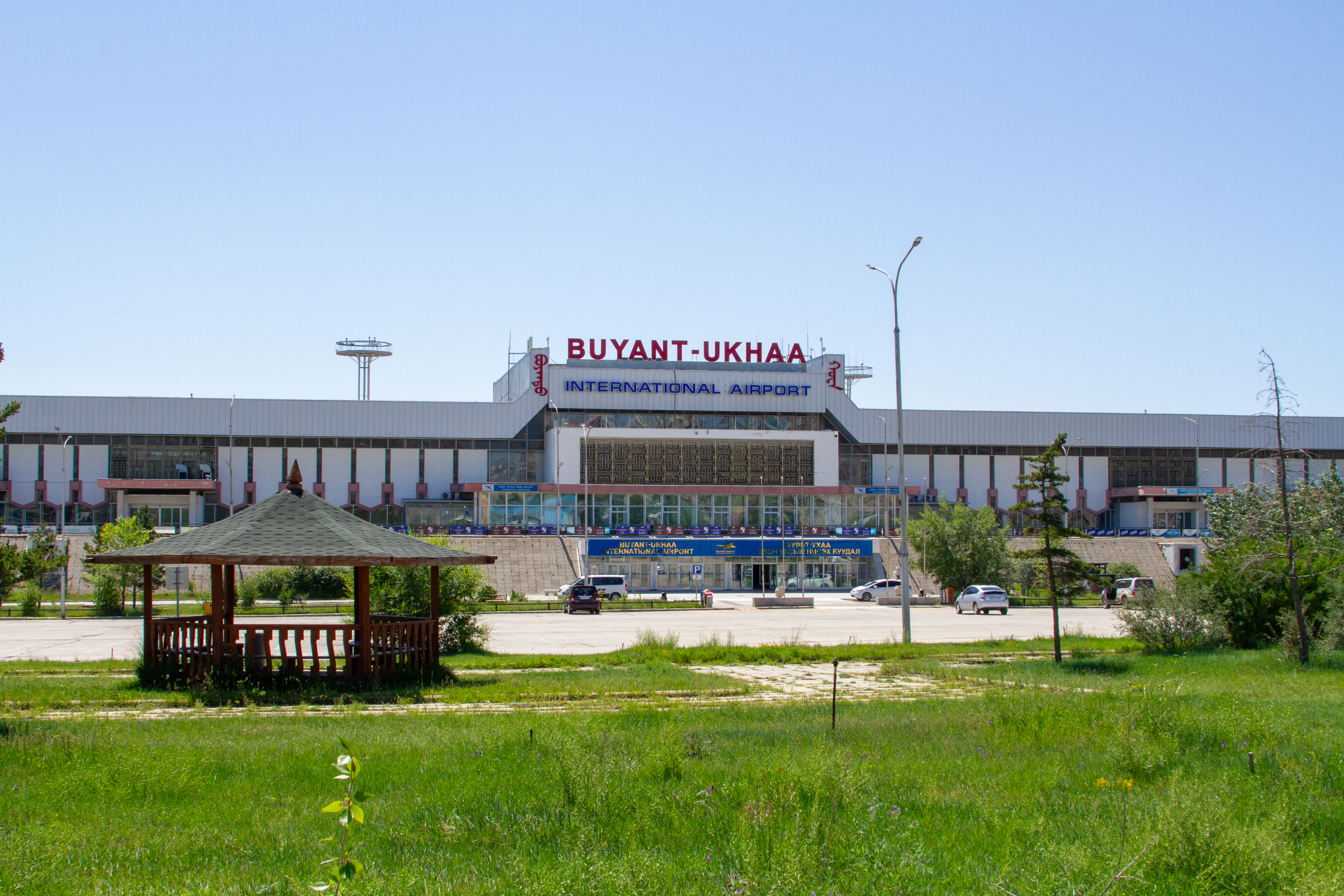
- Airport in 2023
- IATA: ULN; ICAO: ZMUB

Summary
- Airport type: Public/military
- Owner: Government of Mongolia
- Operator: Civil Aviation Authority of Mongolia
- Location: Khan Uul, Ulaanbaatar, Mongolia
- Elevation AMSL: 1,300 m / 4,364 ft
- Coordinates: 47°50′35″N 106°45′59″E
- Website: buyant-ukhaa.airport.gov.mn

Map
- Location within Mongolia

Runways
| Direction | Length | | Surface |
| Direction | m | ft | Surface |
|---|---|---|---|
| 14/32 | 3,100 | 10,170 | Asphalt |
| 15/33 | 2,000 | 6,560 | Grass |

Statistics (2019 ULN)
- Aircraft movements: 18,109
- Passengers: 1,594,518
- Tonnes of cargo: 5,406
- Sources: Civil Aviation Administration of Mongolia

Buyant-Ukhaa International Airport, (Note: Mongolian: Буянт-Ухаа олон улсын нисэх буудал, romanized: Buyant-Ukhaa olon ulsiin nisekh buudal, pronounced [pʊ́jntʰ‿ʊχáː ɔ́ɮɞɴ ʊɬsíːɴ nísɪx pʊ́ːtəɬ]) formerly called Chinggis Khaan International Airport (Note: Mongolian: Чингис хаан олон улсын нисэх буудал, romanized: Chingis khaan olon ulsiin nisekh buudal, [t͡ɕʰíŋkɪs χaːɴ ɔ́ɮɞɴ ʊɬsíːɴ nísɪx pʊ́ːtəɬ]) from 2005 to 2020 (IATA: ULN, ICAO: ZMUB), is a semi-operational international airport serving Ulaanbaatar, Mongolia, situated 18 km (11 mi) southwest of the capital. Largely replaced by a new airport, it currently functions as a backup airport for the former, with a view to being used for flight training as well as for special, charter, and government flights.

== History ==
=== Development ===
The airport was first established as Buyant-Ukhaa Central Airport (Note: Mongolian: Буянт-Ухаа нисэх онгоцны төв буудал, romanized: Buyant-Uhaa niseh ongocnii töw buudal, [ˌpʊjə̆n̥tʰ‿ʊˈχa ˈɲisɪç ɔɴɢɞʰt͡sˈni tʰɵw̹ ˈpʊˑtəɮ]) on 19 February 1957. In 1958, international flights began with flights to Irkutsk and Beijing using Ilyushin Il-14 aircraft. Regular flights from the airport started in 1961.

The terminal was upgraded to make it suitable for international traffic in 1986.

Following the Mongolian Revolution of 1990 and between 1994 and 1997 a further major upgrade of construction and air navigation was achieved with the assistance of the Asian Development Bank, making the airport compliant with ICAO standards. The US$50 million construction project was carried out by the successful bidder: a German / English joint venture of Philipp Holzmann and Wimpey Asphalt.

The airport was renamed after Chinggis Khaan (Genghis Khan) to Chinggis Khaan International Airport to celebrate the 800th anniversary of the establishment of a Mongolian State on 21 December 2005. The airport achieved steady growth during the 2000s, with passenger numbers first reaching 1 million in 2012, and reaching a peak of 1.6 million in 2019, before collapsing due to the COVID-19 pandemic.

=== Replacement airport ===
The airport was replaced by the opening of the new Ulaanbaatar International Airport in 2021. Buyant-Ukhaa is somewhat restricted, the single runway is used in one direction for arriving aircraft and in the opposite direction for departures. The new airport significantly expands capacity, and is located at the Khoshigt Valley, 52 kilometres (32 mi) south of Ulaanbaatar city center. With the new airport named Chinggis Khaan International Airport, Buyant-Ukhaa reverted to its former name on July 1, 2020.

In May 2023, it hosted the Buyant-Ukhaa Airshow, the first airshow exhibited in the country.

== Former airlines and destinations ==
| Airlines | Destinations |
|---|---|
| Aero Mongolia | Altai, Dalanzadgad, Irkutsk, Khovd, Mörön, Ölgii, Ovoot, Oyu Tolgoi, Tavan Tolgoi, Tianjin, Ulaangom |
| Aeroflot | Moscow–Sheremetyevo |
| Air Busan | Busan |
| Air China | Beijing–Capital, Hohhot |
| Asiana Airlines | Seoul–Incheon |
| Eznis Airways | Hong Kong |
| Hunnu Air | Bayankhongor, Choibalsan, Dalanzadgad, Khovd, Mörön, Ölgii, Ulaangom, Ulan-Ude |
| IrAero | Seasonal: Ulan-Ude |
| Korean Air | Seoul–Incheon |
| MIAT Mongolian Airlines | Beijing–Capital, Berlin, Hong Kong, Seoul–Incheon, Tokyo–Narita; Seasonal: Bangkok–Suvarnabhumi |
| SCAT Airlines | Astana |
| Tianjin Airlines | Tianjin |
| Turkish Airlines | Istanbul |

== Statistics ==
=== Traffic figures ===
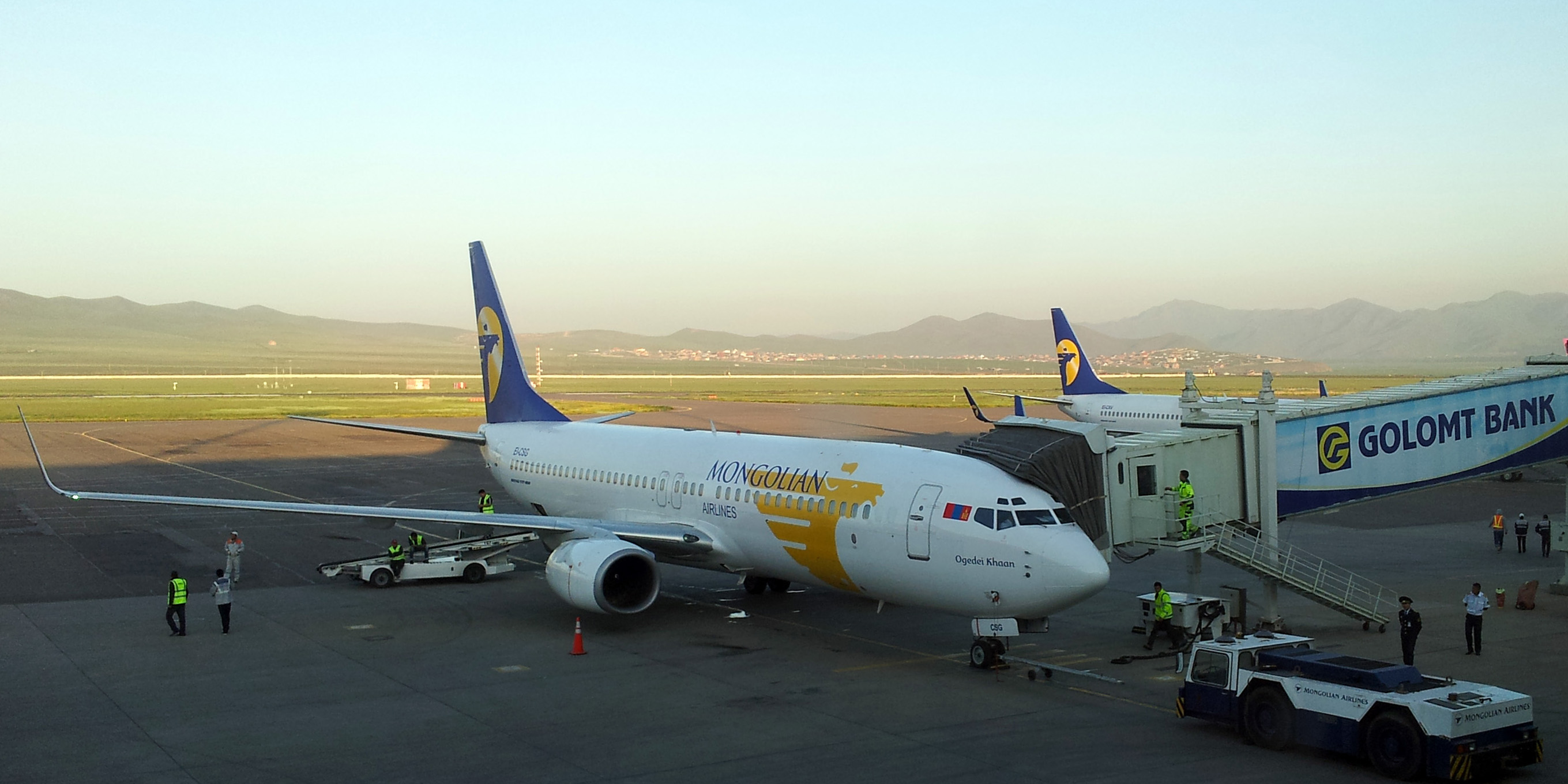
Two MIAT Mongolian Airlines Boeing 737-800s at Buyant-Ukhaa International Airport

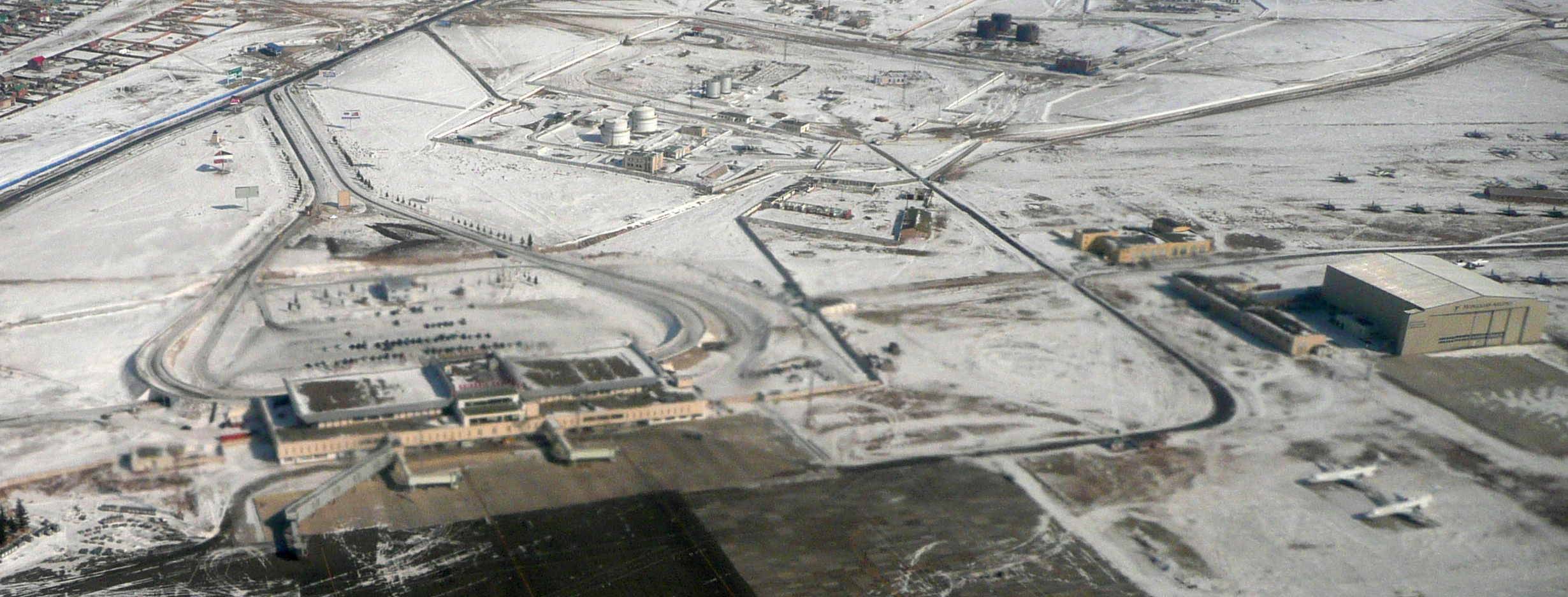
Aerial view of Buyant-Ukhaa International Airport

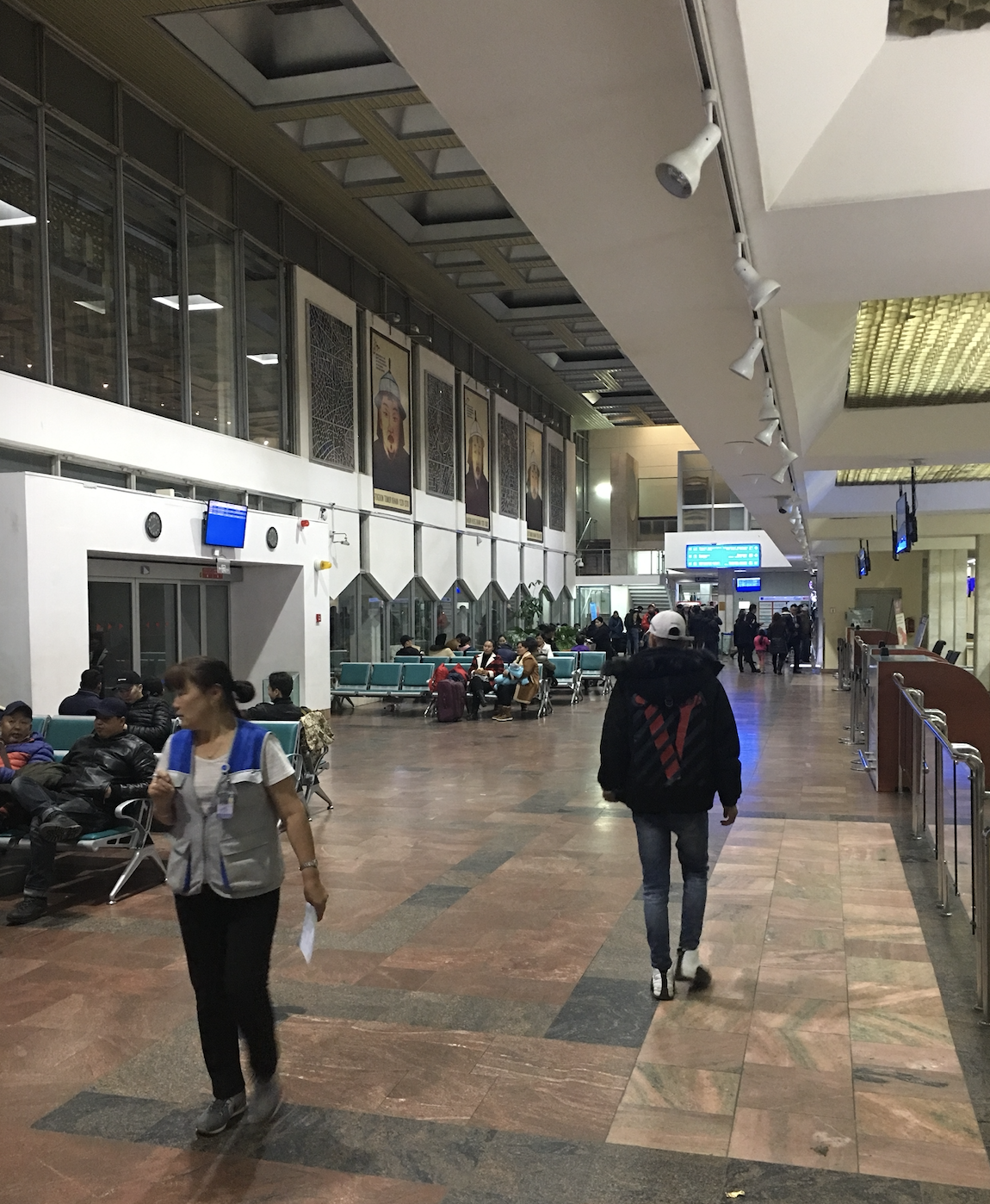
Interior of domestic terminal

Annual traffic
| | Passengers | Change | Movements | Cargo (tons) | Change |
|---|---|---|---|---|---|
| 2007 | 599,555 | ▲+9.6% | 9,297 | 3,299 | ▲+11.2% |
| 2008 | 596,765 | ▼-0.5% | 9,552 | 3,500 | ▲+2.7% |
| 2009 | 532,861 | ▼-10.7% | 8,330 | 2,970 | ▼-12.8% |
| 2010 | 665,055 | ▲+24.8% | 11,678 | 3,922 | ▲+40.2% |
| 2011 | 885,885 | ▲+33.2% | 14,940 | 5,452 | ▲+27.9% |
| 2012 | 1,098,865 | ▲+24.0% | 17,465 | 5,709 | ▲+16.9% |
| 2013 | 1,106,704 | ▲+0.7% | 16,468 | 5,825 | ▼-5.7% |
| 2014 | 1,019,102 | ▼-7.9% | 13,178 | 4,955 | ▼-20.0% |
| 2015 | 955,867 | ▼-6.2% | 10,985 | 4,710 | ▼-4.9% |
| 2016 | 1,023,045 | ▲+7.0% | 11,682 | 4,852 | ▲+3.0% |
| 2017 | 1,251,775 | ▲+22.3% | 13,594 | 5,022 | ▲+15.0% |
| 2018 | 1,422,498 | ▲+13.6% | 14,899 | 5,339 | ▲+6.3% |
| 2019 | 1,621,571 | ▲+14.0% | 18,109 | 5,406 | ▲+1.3% |
| 2020 | 447,478 | ▼-72.4% | 7,284 | 2,501 | ▼-53.7% |
Sources: Civil Aviation Administration of Mongolia

=== Top destinations ===
Busiest domestic routes from Ulaanbaatar (2019)
| Rank | Airport | Passengers | Airlines |
|---|---|---|---|
| 1 | Oyu Tolgoi, Ömnögovi | 275,466 | Aeromongolia, Hunnu Air, MIAT |
| 2 | Ölgii, Bayan-Ölgii | 23,960 | Aeromongolia, Hunnu Air |
| 3 | Khovd, Khovd | 23,650 | Aeromongolia, Hunnu Air |
| 4 | Mörön, Khövsgöl | 16,863 | Aeromongolia, Hunnu Air |
| 5 | Ulaangom, Uvs | 15,177 | Aeromongolia, Hunnu Air |
| 6 | Ovoot, Ömnögovi | 14,873 | Aeromongolia, Hunnu Air |
| 7 | Dalanzadgad, Ömnögovi | 13,324 | Aeromongolia, Hunnu Air |
| 8 | Altai, Govi-Altai | 11,055 | Aeromongolia, Hunnu Air |
| 9 | Choibalsan, Dornod | 6,121 | Aeromongolia, Hunnu Air |
| 10 | Uliastai, Zavkhan | 3,409 | Aeromongolia |
Sources: Civil Aviation Administration of Mongolia

Busiest international routes from Ulaanbaatar (2019)
| Rank | Airport | Scheduled passengers | Carriers |
|---|---|---|---|
| 1 | (South Korea) Seoul–Incheon, Korea | 387,740 | MIAT, Asiana, Korean Air |
| 2 | Beijing, China | 214,567 | MIAT, Air China |
| 3 | Moscow, Russia | 94,890 | MIAT, Aeroflot |
| 4 | Hong Kong | 88,846 | Eznis, MIAT |
| 5 | Tokyo, Japan | 79,118 | MIAT |
| 6 | Busan, South Korea | 64,498 | MIAT, Air Busan |
| 7 | Erenhot, China | 50,608 | Hunnu Air |
| 8 | Istanbul, Turkey | 36,881 | Turkish Airlines |
| 9 | Berlin, Germany | 17,072 | MIAT |
| 10 | Hohhot, China | 15,913 | Aeromongolia |
Sources: Civil Aviation Administration of Mongolia

== Other facilities ==
The airline Aero Mongolia has its head office on the third floor of the main airport building. The Air Accident Investigation Bureau Mongolia has its head office on the airport property. There is also one cargo hangar.

== See also ==
- List of airports in Mongolia
- List of airlines of Mongolia
