= Exploration diamond drilling =

Technique of geological core drilling

Drilling rig capable of both diamond and reverse circulation drilling.

Exploration diamond drilling is used in the mining industry to probe the contents of known ore deposits and potential sites. By withdrawing a small diameter core of rock from the orebody, geologists can analyze the core by chemical assay and conduct petrologic, structural, and mineralogical studies of the rock. It is also often used in the geotechnical engineering industry for foundation testing in conjunction with soil sampling methods. The technique is named for the diamond encrusted drill bit used.

== History ==
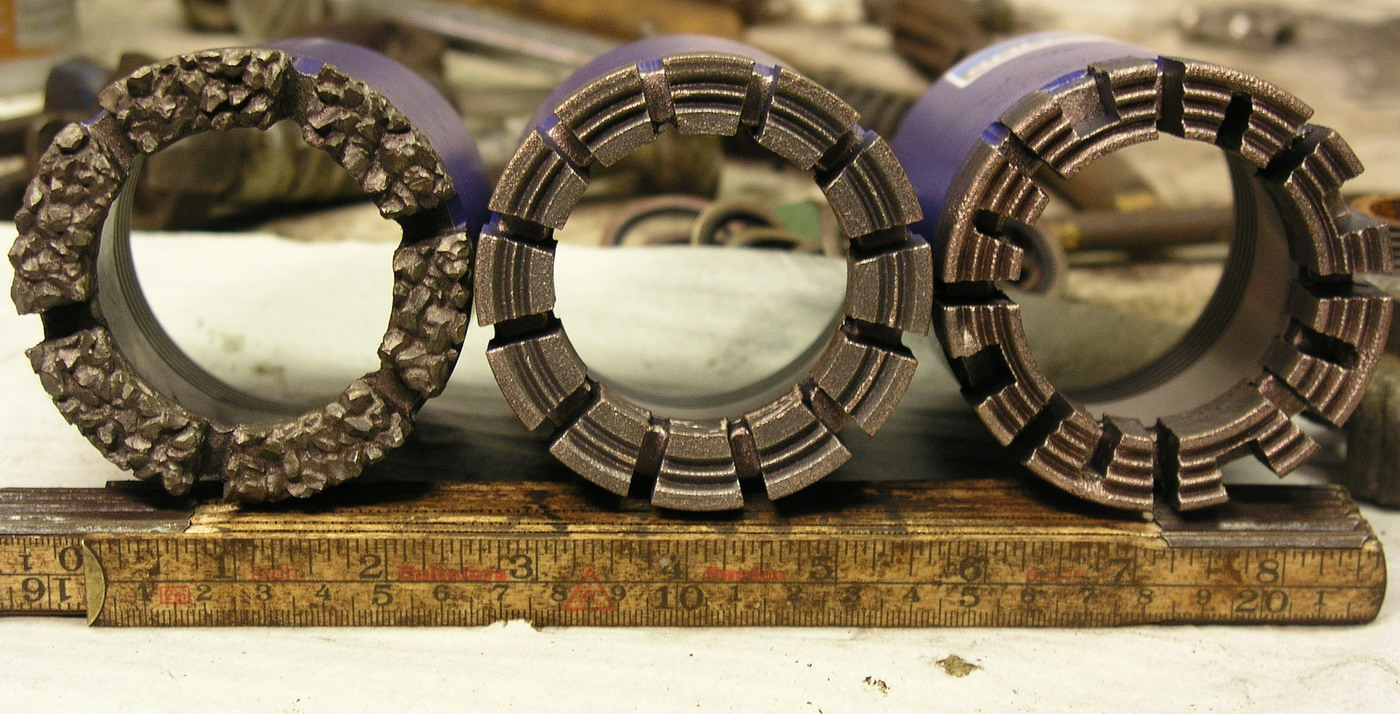
Diamond core drill bits

Rodolphe Leschot is often cited as being the inventor of the first core bit in 1863. Early diamond drilling opened up many new areas for mineral mining, and was related to a boom in mineral exploration in remote locations. Before the invention of the portable diamond drill, most mineral prospecting was limited to finding outcrops at the surface and hand digging. In the late 1970s, General Electric pioneered the technology of polycrystalline diamond compacts (PDCs) as a replacement for natural diamonds in drill bits.

== Diamond drilling ==
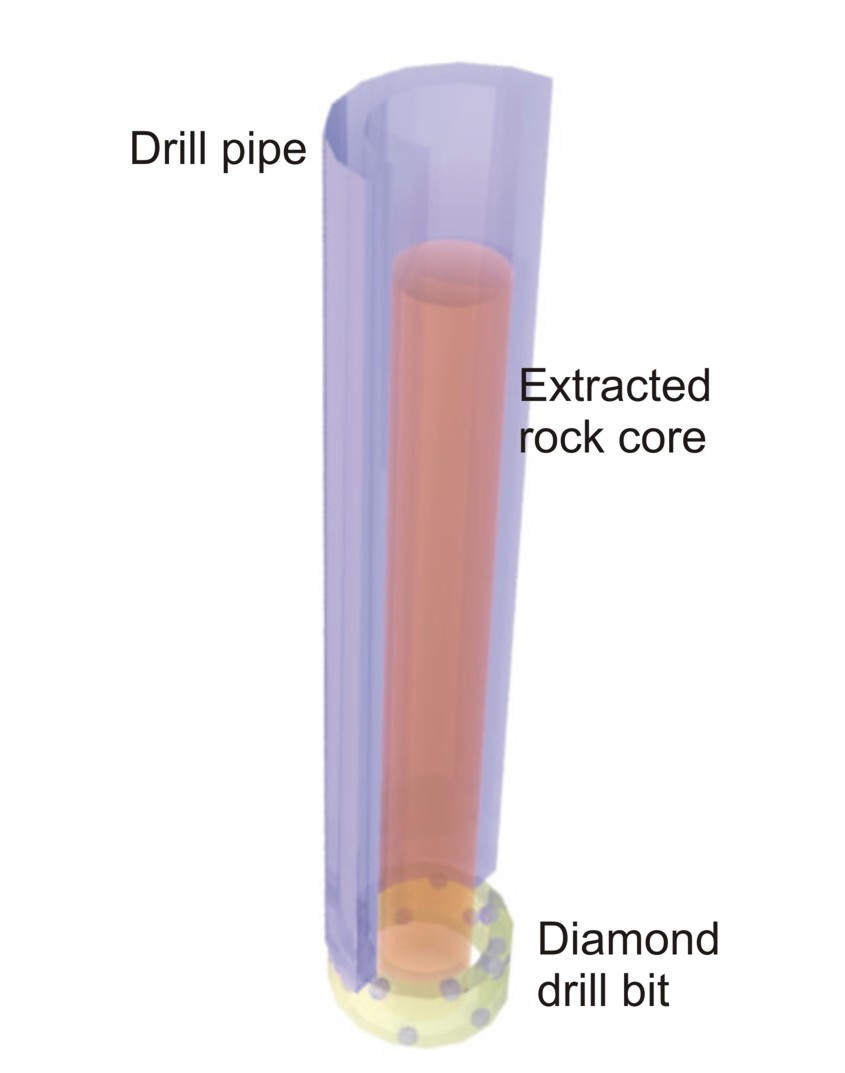
Illustration showing drill core

Exploration diamond drilling differs from other geological drilling (such as Reverse Circulation (RC) Drilling) in that a solid core is extracted from depth, for examination on the surface. The key technology of the diamond drill is the actual diamond bit itself. It is composed of industrial diamonds set into a soft metallic matrix. As shown in the figure, the diamonds are scattered throughout the matrix, and the action relies on the matrix to slowly wear during the drilling process, so as to expose more diamonds. The bit is mounted onto a core barrel, that is attached to the drill string, which is connected to a rotary drill rig. Drilling mud is injected into the drill pipe, so as to wash out the rock cuttings produced by the bit and also to reduce the heat produced due to friction which causes less wear and tear of the bits. An actual diamond bit is a complex affair, usually designed for a specific rock type, with many channels for washing.

The drill uses a diamond encrusted drill bit (pictured on the right) to drill through the rock. The drill produces a "core" which is photographed and split longitudinally. Half of the split core is assayed, while the other half is permanently stored for future use and re-assaying if necessary. Although a larger diameter core is the most preferred it is the most expensive. The most common wire line tube diameters and purposes are NQ (47.6mm) and HQ (63.5mm).

== Core extraction ==
Extraction of core using triple-tube

Merely advancing the drill by rotary action (and washing) causes a core to be extracted inside the barrel as shown. However, at a depth of perhaps 300 m, there must be a way to retrieve the core and take it to the surface. Constantly withdrawing the entire heavy drill pipe is impractical, so wireline drilling methods were developed to pull up the core inside the barrel. If the rock would always be solid granite, and the core would always break at the drill bit, then it would be a simple matter to stop the drilling, and lower a simple grabbing device by a wire and pull up the core. Unfortunately, many applications require an undisturbed core in fractured rock, which calls for elaborate wire-line devices.

The photo shows the extraction of a core, using a triple-tube wire-line system, capable of extracting core under the worst conditions. This is very important when exploring fault zones such as the San Andreas Fault.

== Tube sizes ==
There are five major "wire line" tube sizes typically used. Larger tubes produce larger diameter rock cores and require more drill power to drive them. The choice of tube size is a trade-off between the rock core diameter desired and the depth that can be drilled with a particular drilling rig motor.

Standard "Q" wire line bit sizes:

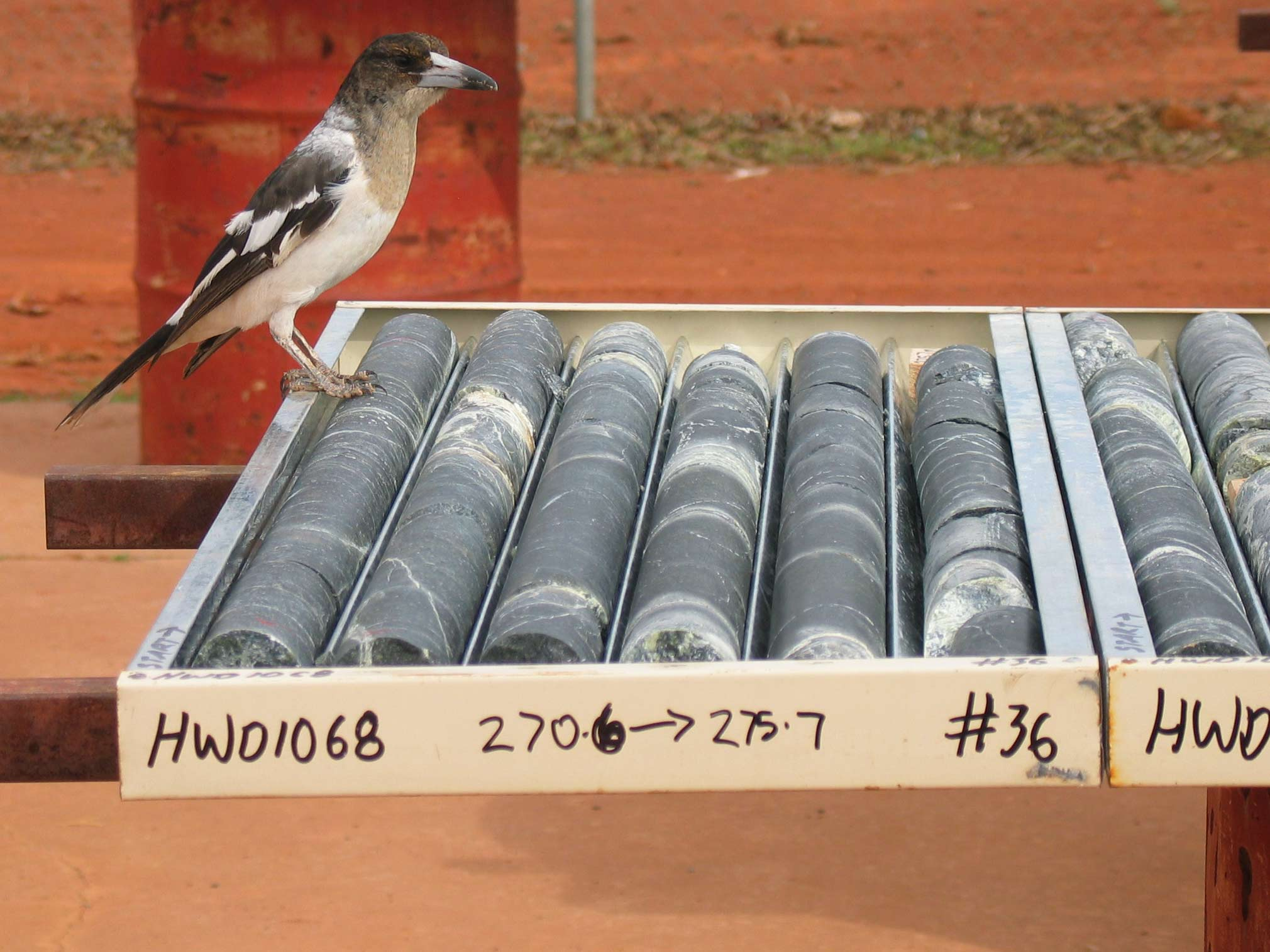
Drill cores

Size	Hole (outside) diameter, mm	Core (inside) diameter, mm
AQ	48	27
BQ	60	36.5
NQ	75.7	47.6
HQ	96	63.5
HQ3	96	61.1
PQ	122.6	85
PQ3	122.6	83
SQ	146.0	102.0
CHD 76	75.7	43.5
CHD 101	101.3	63.5
CHD 134	134.0	85.0
