= Loveland =

Loveland may refer to:

== Places ==
- Lake Loveland, a reservoir on Sweetwater River in California
  - Loveland Dam, a dam on Lake Loveland in California
- Loveland, Colorado
- Loveland Ski Area, Colorado
- Loveland Pass, Colorado
- Loveland, Iowa
- Loveland, New York
- Loveland, Ohio
- Loveland, Oklahoma
- Loveland, Washington, a former town in Pierce County

== Music ==
- Loveland (band), an electronic musical group
- Loveland (R. Kelly album), an unreleased R. Kelly album
- Loveland (John Sykes album)
- Loveland (Suki Waterhouse album)
- Loveland, a 1978 album by Lonnie Liston Smith

== Other uses ==
- Loveland (surname)
- Loveland (TV series), a cancelled British dating game show
- Loveland (film), an Australian film
- Loveland Building and Coors Building, a building in Golden, Colorado
- Loveland frog, a legendary creature from Ohio

== See also ==
- Loveland High School (disambiguation)
- Love Land (disambiguation)
- Løvland, a Norwegian surname
