= Sexuality in South Korea =

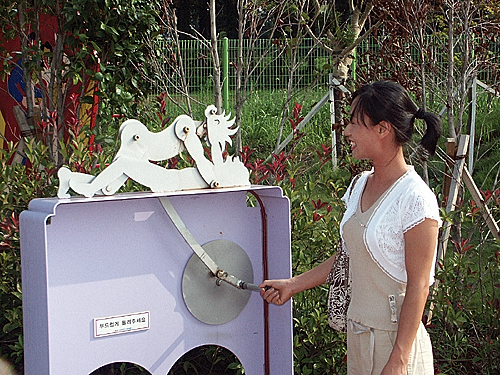
An interactive sculpture at Love Land, a sculpture park aimed at mitigating the decline in sex drive and stigma of sexuality in South Korea

Sexuality in South Korea has been influenced by culture, religion, and westernization. Viewpoints in contemporary society can be viewed as a conflict between the traditional, conservative older generation and the more liberal and 'modern' generation. Due to this conflict, several issues in Korea, including sexual education, homosexuality, and sexual behavior are highly contested.

== Historical perspective ==
=== Traditional roles of women ===
Women have been marginalized throughout Korean history. Women could not participate in the main social system and were discriminated against on the basis of: their roles in marriage, fertility, lack of rights in divorce proceedings, and set roles in society.

Historically, Korean society was patriarchal, especially due to Confucianism. The position of a woman depended on the position of a male member of her family. Only the women of the ruling class could enjoy the same privileges of the men in the same class. Although men were allowed to have multiple wives, women were expected to maintain chastity and were compelled to remain unmarried if their husbands died. The aforementioned societal norms began to be enforced during the Joseon Dynasty. For instance, chastity of widows was enforced by forbidding the sons and grandsons of remarried women from taking the Gwageo. However, women were entitled to inherit property.

In the family, women were expected to take care of the family finances. Women from lower class had jobs such as mudang, or shamans; folk healer; kisaeng. Female shamans outnumbered male shamans, and women were usually only examined by women folk healers. Women were excluded from schools until 1886, when Ewha Hakdang was established.

=== Marriage system ===
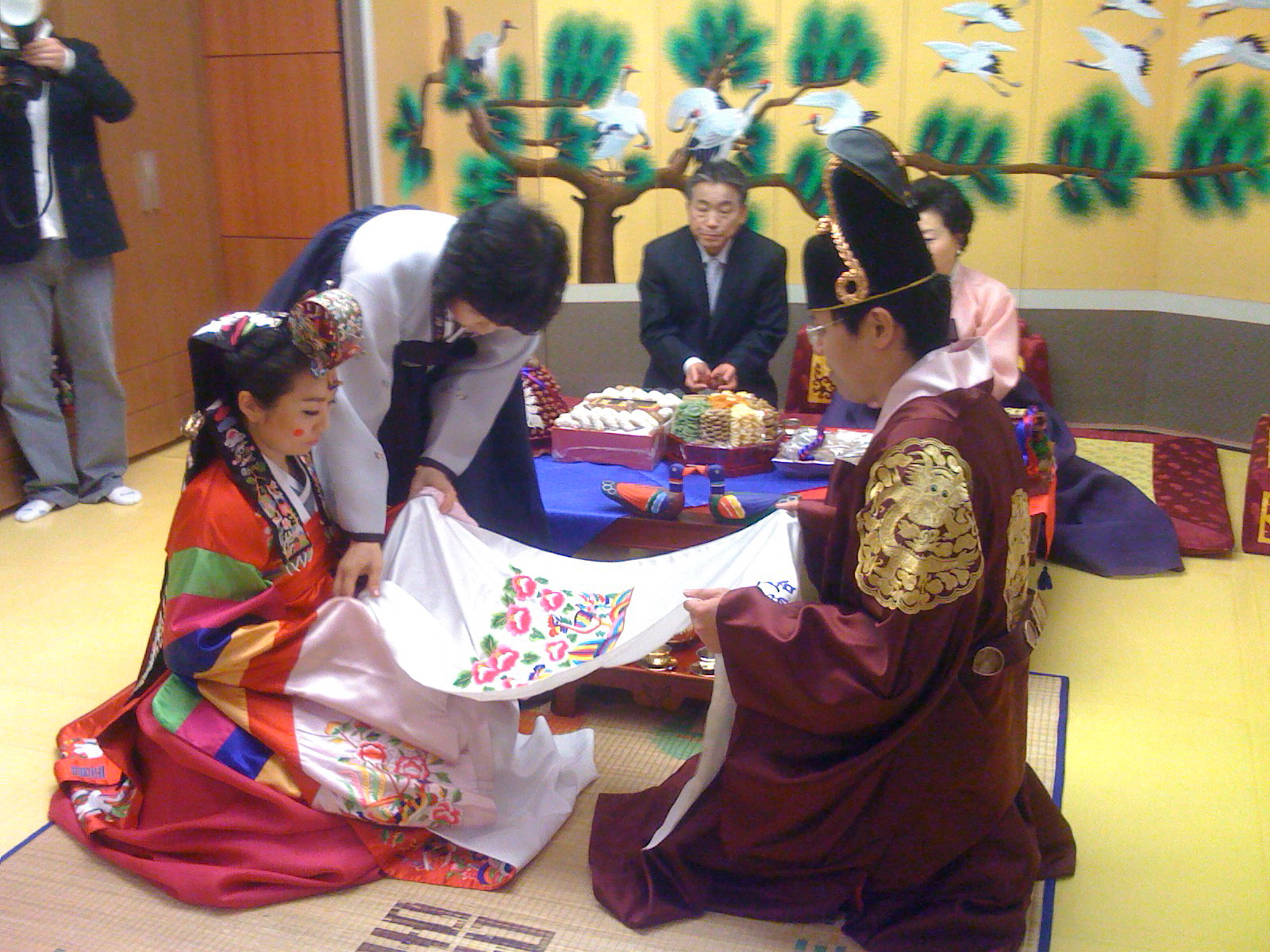
A modern enactment of the traditional pyebaek ceremony, which is usually held after the wedding ceremony

During the Goryeo Dynasty (918–1392), monogamy was supported while divorce and remarriage were common. However, the aristocracy in this period practiced polygamy, and a man was legally allowed to have up to four wives. During the Joseon Dynasty (1392–1897), monogamy was established as the official policy. However, elites were legally allowed to maintain concubines; however, children birthed with concubines were declared illegitimate since the early 15th century, and were banned from gwageo since 1471. During this period, women's remarriage was prohibited from 1447 to 1897. Marriage with those with both the same surname and family origin was forbidden, and is still forbidden today. (Note: In this case, having the same surname does not simply refer to a same last name, but rather the implicit background of the name; for instance, the same last name 'Kim' may be classified as either Gwangju or Eusung)

During this time, early marriages were common. Early marriages were often arranged and can be traced back to the Three Kingdoms of Korea period (57 AD-668). Children about 10 years old could be presented to another family; this was done for both boys and girls. In the Joseon dynasty, the legal age for marriage was 15 for boys and 14 for girls. When a child assumed responsibility for the child's family, the child could marry at the age of 12. The society commonly believed that a higher age for marriage was associated with inappropriate sexual activity. This custom continued unto the 20th century.

=== Religion ===
Religion in South Korea (2015 census)
1. No religion (56.1%)
2. Protestantism (19.7%)
3. Korean Buddhism (15.5%)
4. Catholicism (7.90%)
5. Other (0.80%)

The traditional concepts of sexuality in Korea have been influenced by: Confucianism, Buddhism, Neo-Confucianism, Catholicism, and Protestantism.

Confucianism became important in the 7th century. During the Goryeo Dynasty, Confucianism served as the practical and philosophical structure of the state, and was the official ideology during the Joseon Dynasty. Neo-Confucianism became prominent in the 15th century. In Confucianism, men were considered to be positive (yang) and women negative (yin). As yang was considered more dominant than yin, men were considered to be comparably omnipotent, justifying male dominance and discrimination against female. Furthermore, sex was considered a duty to the family, rather than an act of pleasure. Although only three percent of the population has Confucianism as a belief system today, it remains the basis for sexual ethics and criminal law.

Buddhism was introduced during the Three Kingdoms period. It was the official religion during the Goryeo Dynasty, but lost influence during the Joseon Dynasty. Buddhism was used to instruct people to give up all desires, including those related to sex, and sexual activities were forbidden in many sects.

Catholicism was introduced at the end of the 17th century and began to become popular among the common people at the end of the 18th century. Though Catholicism was outlawed and banned, and the followers executed, it continued to have underground support. Protestantism was introduced on 1884. Both religions were involved in several intellectual movements, and promoted equal rights.

== Information about sex ==
=== Sexual education ===
In the Joseon Dynasty, unmarried men and women received a very limited form of sexual education. The education was focused on methods of becoming pregnant and consequent reproduction. Married couples received a calendar that stated information about the best days for fertility; this information was usually given only to the bride, although the groom sometimes received it. As producing children was considered a duty, families sometimes intervened. Prenatal care was considered important and was given even before conception.

The traditional lack of information and education concerning sexual issues is currently conflicting with Western viewpoints of sexuality, and can be seen through the increasing rates of teenage pregnancy and sexual abuse. In 1968, the Planned Parenthood Federation of Korea (PPFK) has started sexual education. Since 1982, counseling centers for adolescents have been provided in schools and industrial parks. However, public education concerning sexuality is inadequate. Sexual education solely focuses on physical development and gender roles such as menstruation, pregnancy, virginity, sexual activities, and Sexually transmitted diseases. In 1996, the Korea Research Institute for Culture and Sexuality was established to develop sexual education programs.

=== Informal sources ===
Starting in the early 1990s, interest in sexual education began to increase. Books, academic interests, and mass media focusing on sexuality began to increase. In 1998, the instructor of a public sexual educational program on television became popular. According to two Korean Research Institute on Sexuality and Culture studies done on 1996 and 1997, 37.1% of male students learned about sex from pornography, while 14% learned it from their peers; for female students, 37% received sexual education from peers while 25.7% received it from school.

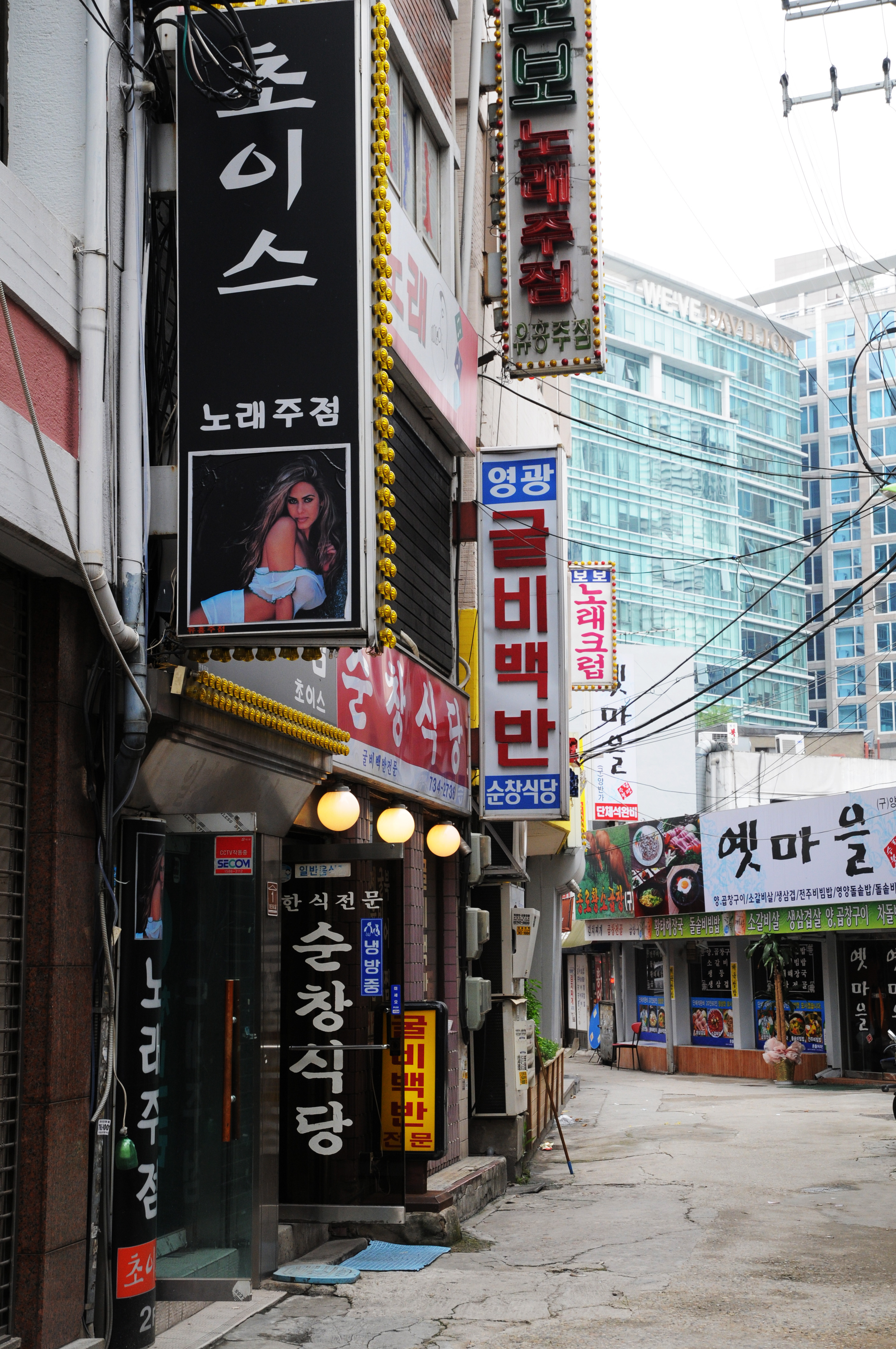
Adult entertainment businesses in Jongno, Seoul

== Sexual behavior ==
=== Autoeroticism ===
According to the Korean Research Institute of Sexuality, 70% of female high school students agreed that masturbation was natural, though only 15.2% of the surveyed students reported masturbating, and the biggest group felt guilty about doing so. In contrast, 49.9% of male high school students reported masturbating. For parents, 75.2% were positive about their own masturbation. The attitudes of the parents toward masturbation had a positive correlation with the attitude of the parents toward their children's masturbation.

=== Pornography ===
Production of pornography is illegal, although amateur material known as Yadong exists. Consequently, Koreans mostly consume pornography from overseas, especially Japanese pornography, sometimes using proxy servers to evade Korean Internet censorship. There are also adult videos filmed abroad with Korean actors, recorded sex cam sessions, and K-pop deepfake pornography, manufactured adult videos with K-pop stars.

In one study, 99.5% of male college students reported that they had been exposed to pornography (excluding participants who declined to answer the question), with 99.1% occasionally using it for masturbation. On average, participants masturbated to pornography 1-2 times a week. Women's pornography use was not investigated.

Yaoi fiction and comics are consumed by a subgroup of women. In 2005, there was a pornographic online magazine named Foxylove that catered mainly to Korean women and reportedly had over a hundred thousand subscribers.

=== Circumcision ===
While the circumcision rates in Korea were extremely high (90% in age groups 17–19) as of 2002, the rates have declined recently; the circumcision rate for males 14–29 is 75.8%, with the aforementioned group rate down to 74.4%. It has been conjectured that the decline in the rate of circumcision was due to the increased availability of new information.

=== LGBTQ rights in South Korea ===
Homosexuality is not outlawed in Korea, but it is also not expressly permitted. On September 7, 2013, the first gay marriage in Korea took place. However, the marriage was not legally binding; the couple has vowed to legally challenge this in court.

== Sexual crimes ==
=== Sexual assault ===
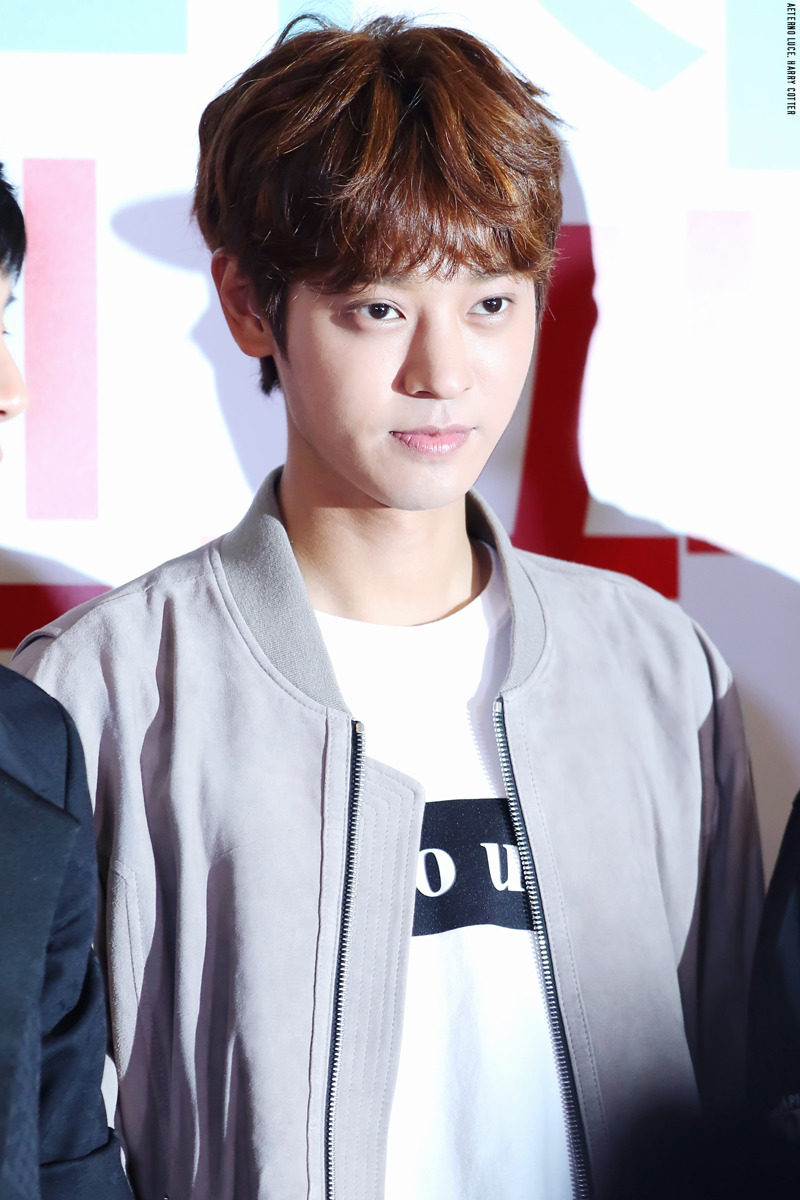
Korean pop idol Jung Joon-young was sentenced to five years in prison for raping multiple unconscious drunk women.

In South Korea, the crime of rape (Korean Criminal Law Article 297) is defined by whether the perpetrator used "violence or duress" to compel sexual intercourse. The use of violence or intimidation is the basis for the legal definition, rather than merely the absence of consent. In 2013, the Supreme Court ruled that spousal rape is a crime, overturning the long-standing view that a wife implicitly consents to sex in marriage. In 2018, the Korean Women's Hotline reported that only about 10 percent of rape complaints it received qualified as rape under the law.

Under the law, rape is punishable with a prison sentence from 7 years to life imprisonment. The definition of rape includes adult males as victims, (Note: Previously, the definition of rape excluded men.) as well as marital rape. As of 2009, the statute of limitations for sexual assault is ten years.

As of 2009, reports of sex crimes have been on the rise, especially those involving child victims. In 2012, there were 77,000 reported cases of sexual assault. In 2011, 22,034 rapes were reported. A study in 1997 found that 45.5% of female high school students reported sexual harassment, mostly by their male friends. These statistics are not considered an accurate representation of the true cases; a 2010 survey by the Ministry of Gender Equality and Family concluded that only about 10 percent of all sexual assault cases were reported.

Currently, there is a prevalent traditional belief that rape is a man's mistake that should be forgiven, especially for victims who had been drunk or wearing revealing clothes. The Miryang gang rape incident in 2004 provoked controversy due to victim blaming and other mistreatment by police officials. This mistreatment ultimately led to a 2008 judgment against the police by the Supreme Court of Korea. There are rape crisis centers available, run by the Ministry of Gender Equality and Family and the Korea Sexual Violence Relief Center.

Between 1986 and 1994, Lee Choon-jae raped and murdered fifteen women and girls in addition to committing numerous sexual assaults, predominantly in Hwaseong, Gyeonggi Province, and the surrounding areas. The murders, which remained unsolved for thirty years, are considered to be the most infamous in modern South Korean history and were the inspiration for the 2003 film Memories of Murder.

Former instructor Gong Hee-sook has filed a lawsuit against Lee Man-hee, the leader of a messianic Christian church Shincheonji, accusing him of sexual exploitation under the pretext of his authority. Gong, who joined Shincheonji in 1992, claims that between 1997 and 2002, she was sexually exploited by Lee. Within Shincheonji, Lee was considered an individual with absolute authority, and Gong asserts that she could not resist this authority. According to her, she was not the only one, as other female followers were also involved with the cult leader.

=== Sex trafficking ===
South Korean and foreign women and girls have been victims of sex trafficking in South Korea. They are raped and physically and psychologically harmed in brothels, businesses, homes, hotels, and other locations throughout the country.

=== Prostitution ===
Prostitution in South Korea is illegal, but according to The Korea Women's Development Institute, the sex trade in Korea was estimated to amount to 14 trillion South Korean won ($13 billion) in 2007, roughly 1.6 percent of the nation's gross domestic product.

The Burning Sun scandal revealed a high-profile case of molka circulation, where celebrities such as Jung Joonyoung and Seungri were found to have filmed or shared explicit sexual videos in a private chat room, many of which were filmed in motel rooms and involved with prostitution rings. In March 2019, developments in the Burning Sun scandal led to the public reveal of Jung Joon-young KakaoTalk chatrooms.

=== Adultery ===
From 1953 to 2015, adultery was punishable by up to two years in prison for both the adulterer and their partner. In February 2015, the Constitutional Court of Korea overturned the law.

== See also ==
- Love Land (Korea)
