= Love Land =

Love Land may refer to:

- Love Land (South Korea), a sex sculpture park on Jeju Island, South Korea
- Love Land (China), a proposed sex theme park, demolished before it opened, in China
- "Love Land" (song), a 1970 song by Charles Wright & the Watts 103rd Street Rhythm Band

== See also ==
- Loveland (disambiguation)
