= Love Land (South Korea) =

Sculpture garden

Coordinates: 33.452°N 126.490°E

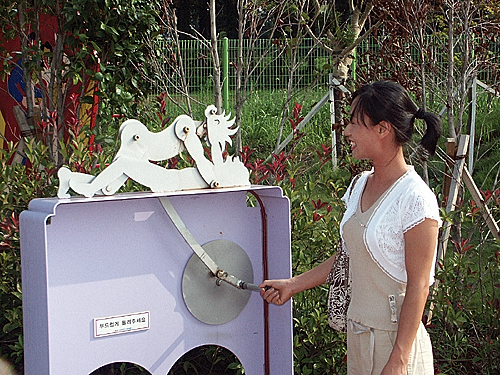
An interactive sculpture at Love Land

Jeju Loveland (Korean: 제주러브랜드; also "Love Land") is an outdoor sculpture park which opened in 2004 in Jeju Province, South Korea. The park is themed around sex. It plays sex education films and has 140 sculptures of humans in various sex positions. It also has other elements such as large phallus statues, stone labia, and hands-on exhibits such as a "masturbation-cycle". The park's website describes the location as "a place where love oriented art and eroticism meet".

== History ==
During the 1970s, Jeju Island became a popular honeymoon destination for Korean couples, due to the island's warm climate and Cold War-era restrictions on overseas travel. Many of the couples had wed because of arranged marriages, and the island also became known for being a center of sex education. According to an article in Germany's Der Spiegel magazine, in the late 1980s journalist and travel writer Simon Winchester reported that some hotel employees on the island performed as "professional icebreakers". In the evenings, the hotel would offer an entertainment program featuring erotic elements, to help newlyweds relax.

In 2002, graduates of Seoul's Hongik University began creating sculptures for the park, which opened on November 16, 2004. Encompassing an area the size of "two soccer fields", all of the sculptures can be viewed in approximately one hour, and there is an additional monthly rotating exhibit featuring works by different Korean artists.

Visitors are required to be at least 18 years old, and a separate play area is available for minors while adults visit. The play area is themed on anime. In 2021, the park temporarily closed for renovation before reopening in May 2023.

== Criticism ==
In 2018, certain exhibitions in the park have been criticized for its depictions of obvious sexual crimes downplayed as "erotic imaginations" such as looking under women's skirts and peeking inside girls in the toilet, when molkas and voyeurism is illegal and such depictions encourage criminal activity. In 2019, the Jeju Women and Family Research Institute decided to investigate it as examples of sexual discrimination and many others like it and remove sexual discrimination content in the tourist industry.

== See also ==
- Haesindang Park
- Love Land (China)
- Chao Mae Tuptim
- Sex museum

== Sources ==
- English-language version of official website (also available in Korean, Japanese, and Chinese)
- "A Phallus Garden in 'Love Land'". Der Spiegel. 11 August 2006.
