= Kharkhorin Rock =

Statue in Kharkhorin, Övörkhangai, Mongolia

Coordinates: 47°11.152′N 102°51.235′E

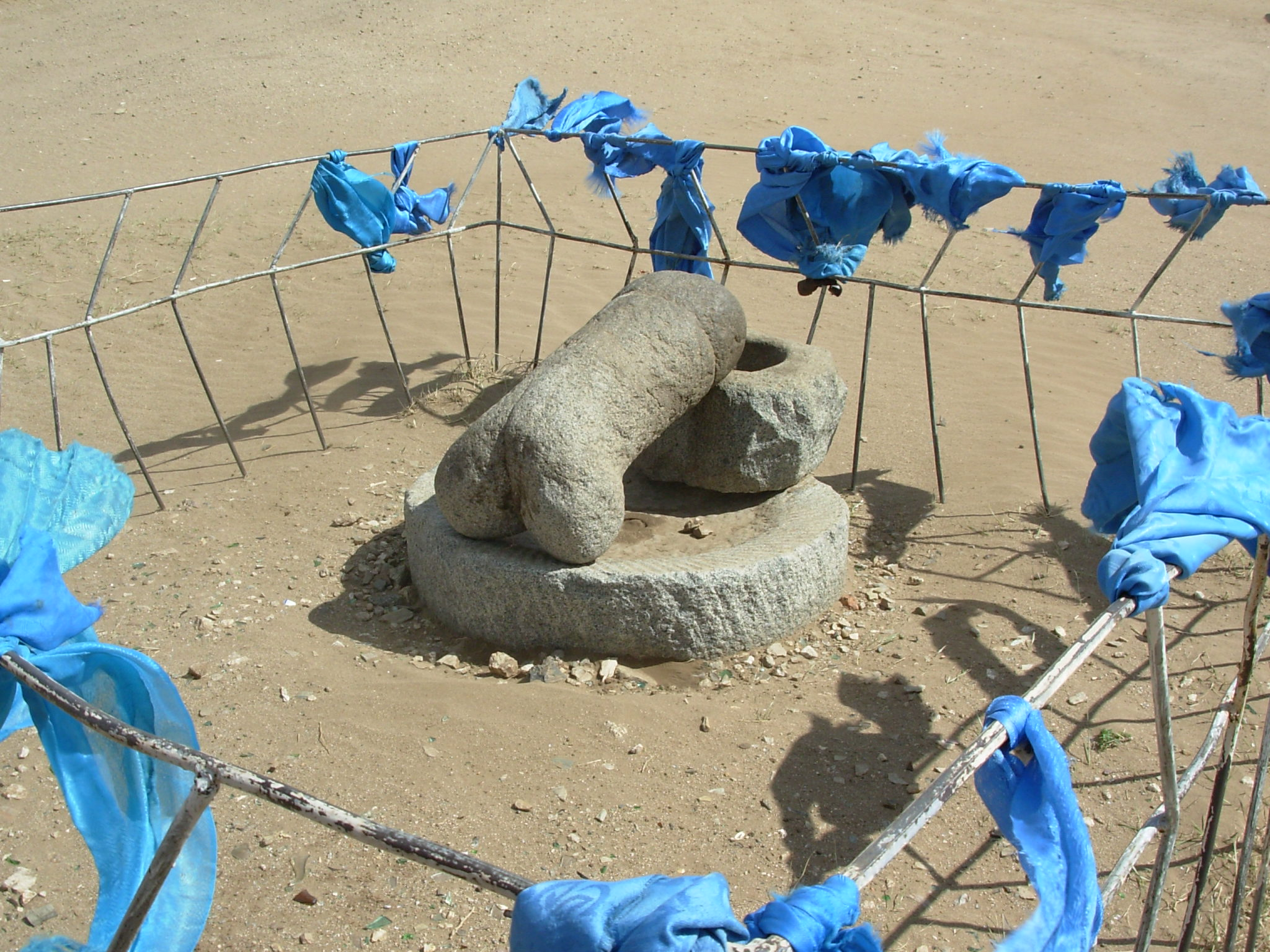
Kharkarin Rock, smaller stone monument

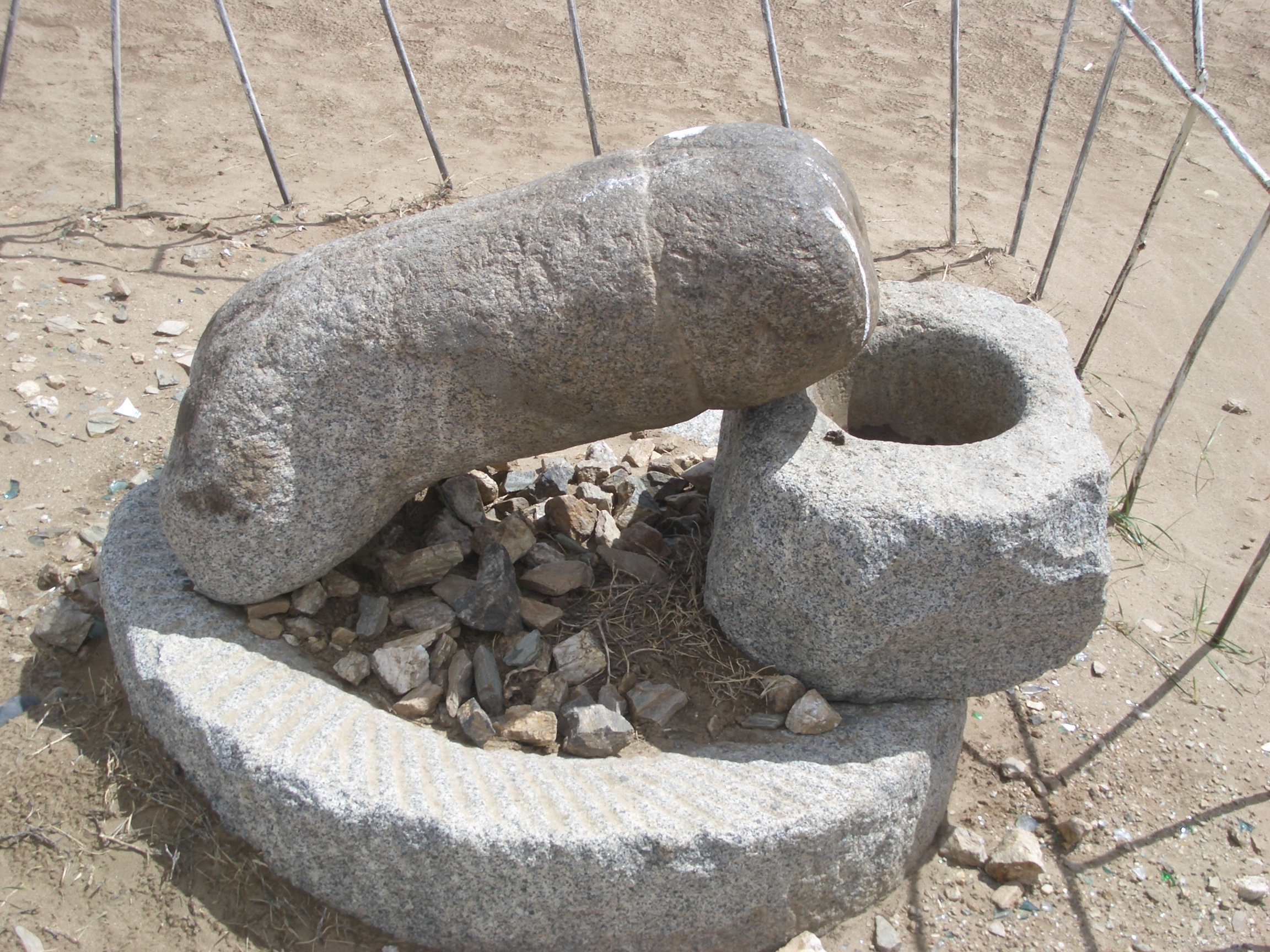
Close up of the stone monument

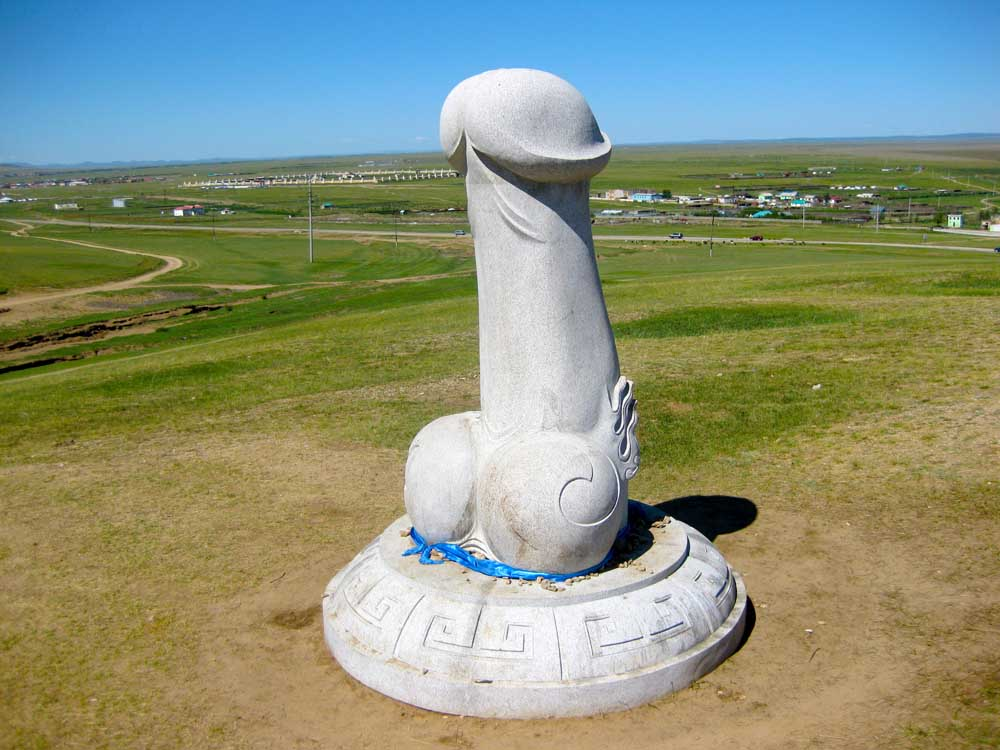
A similar, newer monument

Kharkhorin Rock, also Kharkarin Rock or Phallic Rock, is a large statue of a penis raised on a platform on the steppe, located near Erdene Zuu Monastery (part of the World Heritage Site entitled Orkhon Valley Cultural Landscape) in Kharkhorin, Övörkhangai Province of Mongolia. The phallic rock statue has dual functions; primarily it is a reminder to the monks to remain celibate, but it is also a symbol of fertility and human life.

== Legend ==
Legend states that a monk who had vowed to be celibate had turned out to be a womanizer. As punishment he was castrated to remind him of his vows of celibacy. As a warning to the other inmate monks of the monastery, a rock in the shape of a penis was prominently engraved as a stone phallus called "Kharkhorin Rock" within walking distance from the monastery, to remind them that they should not be indulging in any sexual activity with the local women.

== Access ==
Lonely Planet says that the statue "points erotically to something interestingly called a 'vaginal slope'" which is hidden in a small valley, about 2 kilometres (1.2 mi) to the southeast of Erdene Zuu Monastery. The river flowing in this basaltic rocky area originates from the Gyatruu range to Kharkhorin soum. It is accessed from the main road by a well-used path. One can see a larger newer statue from the road from Ulaanbaatar road and 1 kilometre (0.62 mi) from Karakhorin hill. Many visitors seek the opportunity to visit the original statue, and many women also approach the site to seek blessings for a child to be born to them. The smaller, 24 inches (610 mm) stone phallus is located within the grounds of the monastery itself, just to the northeast of the main monastery building.

There are also four rocks in the shape of turtles (considered to be symbols of protection and eternity) marking the four cardinal directions of the ancient boundary limits of Karakorum. The stones are inscribed with their past history on the back.

== See also ==
- Phallic Rock in Arizona
- Phallic architecture

== Sources ==
- Blunden, Jane (2008). Mongolia. Bradt Travel Guides. ISBN 9781841621784.
- Kohn, Michael (1 May 2008). Mongolia. Lonely Planet. p. 123. ISBN 978-1-74104-578-9.
- Shagdar, Sharavyn (2004). A hundred routes through Mongolia: Mongolian tourism geography. Indiana University. ISBN 9789992961452.
