= Loveland (surname) =

Loveland is a surname. Notable people with the surname include:

- Albert J. Loveland (1893–1961), American politician
- Colston Loveland (born 2004), American football player
- Donald W. Loveland (born 1934), American computer scientist
- Ian Loveland (born 1983), American mixed martial arts fighter
- Kate Loveland, Australian fertility researcher
- Ralph A. Loveland (1819–1899), American politician
- Tobias Loveland (born 1991), English association football coach
- William A. H. Loveland (1826–1894), American politician
