= Yonghwasa =

Buddhist temple in Jeju City, South Korea

Religion
- Affiliation: Korean Buddhism
- District: Jeju City
- Province: Jeju Province

Location
- Country: South Korea
- Interactive map of Yonghwasa
- Coordinates: 33.51559°N 126.51528°E

Yonghwasa (Korean: 용화사; Hanja: 龍華寺), sometimes Dragon Pool Temple, is a Buddhist temple in Yongdamdong, Yongyeon (龍淵) region in Jeju City, South Korea. The temple, set within a walled compound and located on the west side of Cheju Castle, contains a phallic shrine which was visited by female pilgrims who came to worship it for its alleged fertility blessings. The phallic stone is made from granite, quite small in size, and white, and was reportedly found in a nearby field by a farmer. The phallic statue is called "Dongjabul" which means "Little Buddha". The statue at the western pillar is called "Seojabok" and its prayer days are February 15th and November 15th in the lunar calendar.

== History ==
Originally a temple called Haeryun Temple (해륜사; 海輪寺) was built at the site during the 13th century. The temple was destroyed in 1702 as part of the effort of the Joseon Dynasty to suppress Buddhism. In the 1960s, the temple was renamed "Yonghwasa" (龍華寺).
