= Løvland =

Løvland is a Norwegian surname. Notable people with the name include:

- Helge Løvland (1890–1984), Norwegian track athlete
- Jørgen Løvland (1848–1922), Norwegian politician and Prime Minister
- Rolf Løvland (born 1955), Norwegian composer

== See also ==
- Loveland (disambiguation)
