= Phallic architecture =

Architectural or sculptural structures representing the human penis

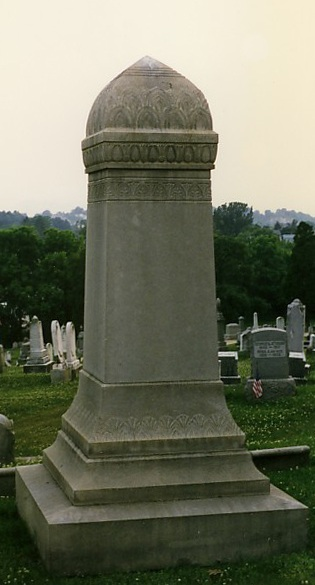
Phallic tombstone

Phallic architecture consciously or unconsciously creates a symbolic representation of the human penis. Buildings intentionally or unintentionally resembling the human penis are a source of amusement to locals and tourists in various places around the world. Deliberate phallic imagery is found in ancient cultures and in the links to ancient cultures found in traditional artifacts.

The ancient Greeks and Romans celebrated phallic festivals and built a shrine with an erect phallus to honor Hermes, messenger of the gods. Those figures may be related to the ancient Egyptian deity Min who was depicted holding his erect phallus. Figures of women with a phallus for a head have been found across Greece and Yugoslavia. Phallic symbolism was prevalent in the architectural tradition of ancient Babylon. The Romans, who were deeply superstitious, also often used phallic imagery in their architecture and domestic items. The ancient cultures of many parts of the Far East, including Indonesia, India, Korea and Japan, used the phallus as a symbol of fertility in motifs on their temples and in other areas of everyday life.

Scholars of anthropology, sociology, and feminism have alleged a symbolic nature of phallic architecture, especially large skyscrapers which dominate the landscape, supposedly as symbols of male domination, power and political authority. Towers and other vertical structures may unintentionally or perhaps subconsciously have those connotations. There are many examples of modern architecture that can be interpreted as phallic, but very few for which the architect has specifically cited or admitted that meaning as an intentional aspect of the design.

== History and background ==
=== Antiquity ===
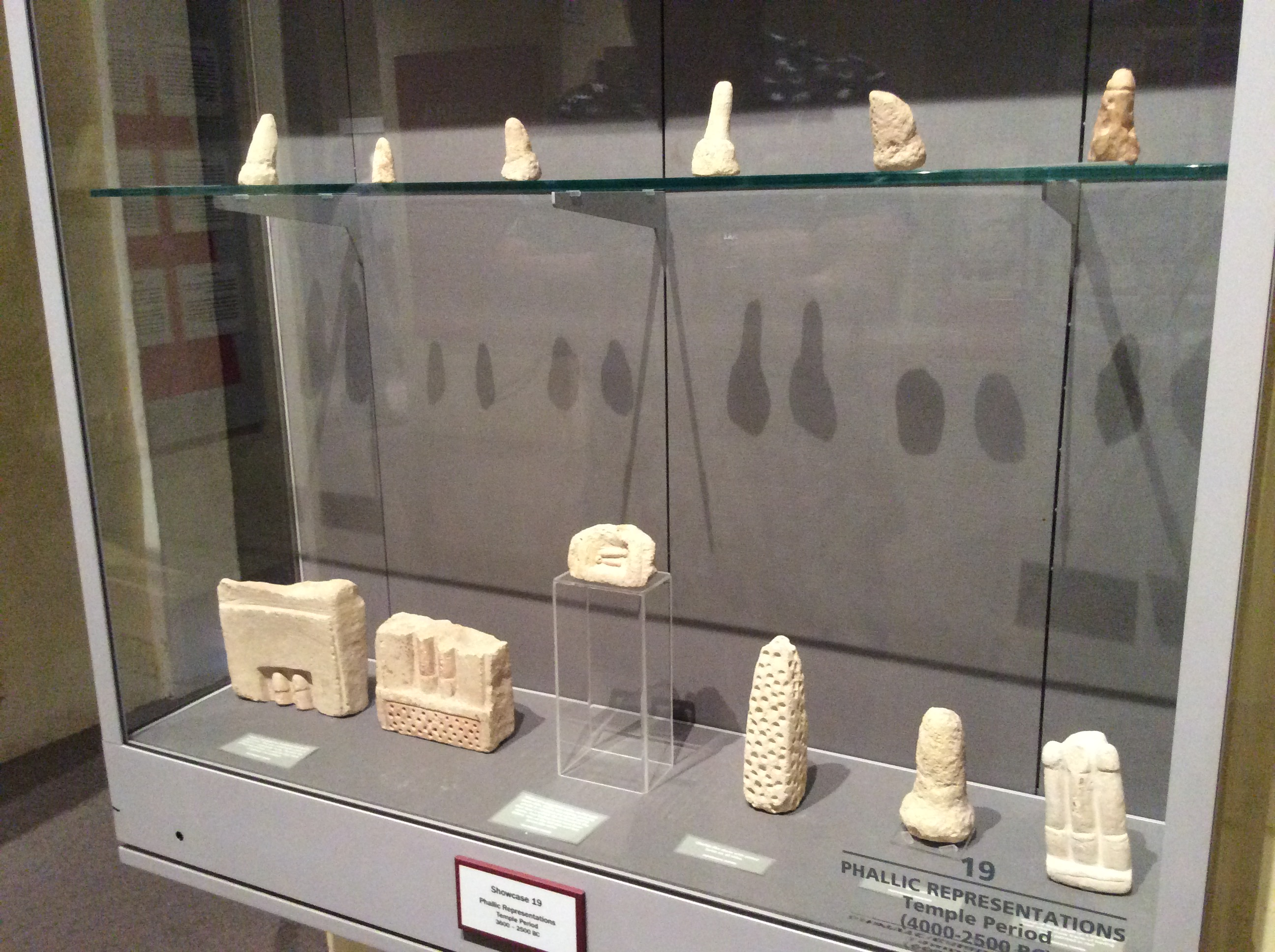
Phallic Temple period (3,500 B.C. - 2,500 B.C.) items at the National Museum of Archaeology, Malta

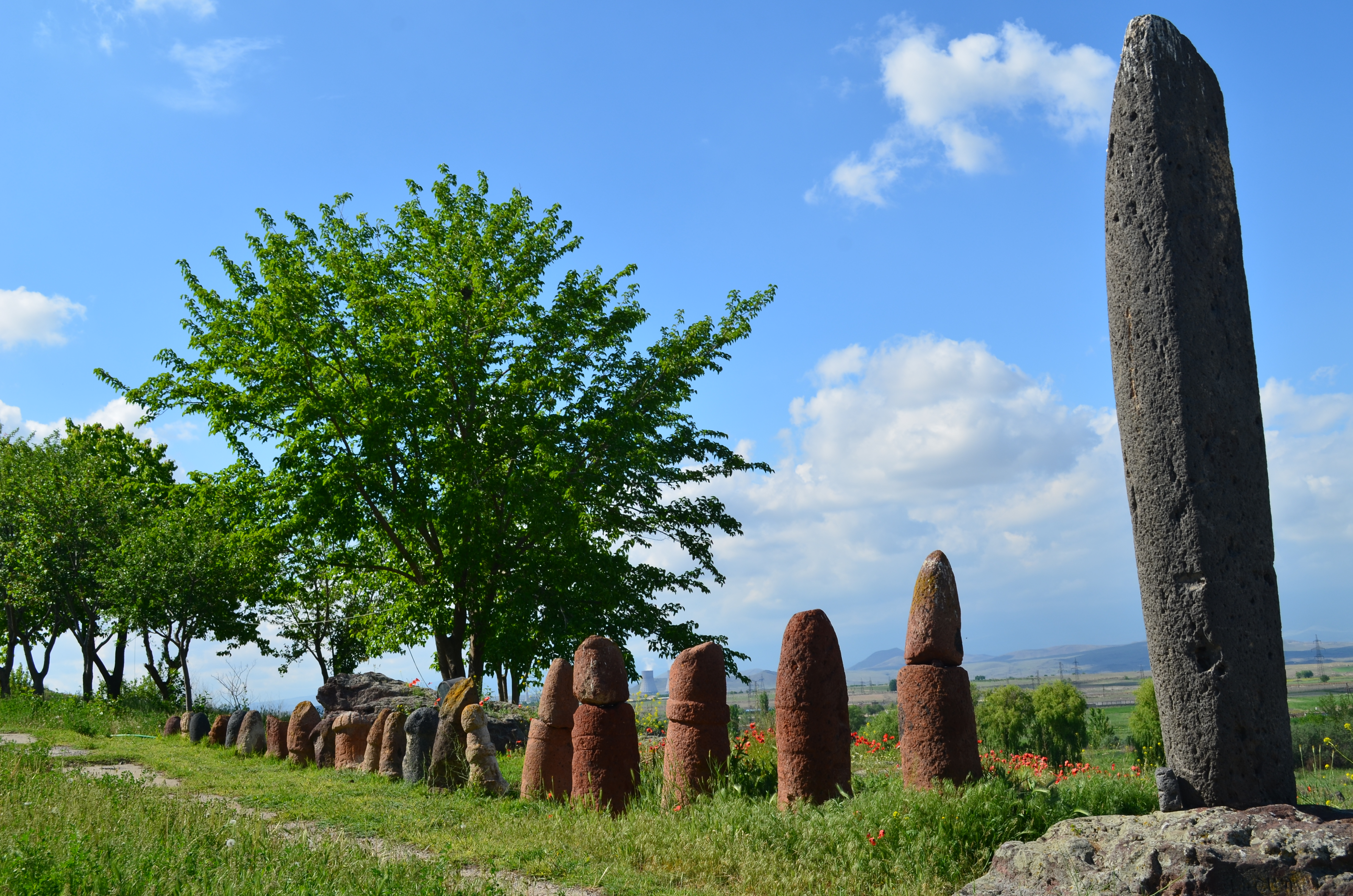
A vishapakar and a number of smaller phallic steles at the Metsamor site, Armenia

Phallic architecture became prominent in ancient Egypt and Greece, where genitalia and human sexuality received a high degree of attention. The ancient Greeks honored the phallus and celebrated phallic festivals. The Greco-Roman deity Priapus was worshiped as a god of fertility, depicted with a giant phallus in numerous public architectural pieces.

The Greeks regularly built a shrine which they called a "herm" at the entrance of homes and public buildings, as well as along roads, to honor Hermes, messenger of the gods. The shrines typically "took the form of a vertical pillar topped by the bearded head of a man and from the surface of the pillar below the head, an erect phallus protruded". It is believed that they sought their inspiration from the ancient Egyptians and their phallic image of Min, the valley god, who was similarly "depicted as a standing bearded king with simplified body, one arm raised, the other hand holding his erect phallus."

Herodotus, the ancient Greek historian, documented women carrying large phallic-shaped monuments and ornaments the size of a human body in villages in ancient Dionysia. On the island of Delos a pillar supports a colossal phallus, the symbol of Dionysus. Phallus reliefs on buildings on such sites are also believed to have been apotropaic devices to ward off evil. The elaborate use of phallic architecture and sculpture in ancient Greek society can also be seen in sites such as Nea Nikomedeia in northern Greece. Archaeologists excavating the ancient town discovered clay sculptures of plump women with phallic heads and folded arms.

Similar figurines of women with phallus heads from the Neolithic period have been found across Greece, Macedonia and parts of old Yugoslavia. The vast majority of the figurines of the Hamangia culture have cylindrical phallus-shaped heads without facial features, although some, particularly of the Aegean culture, had phallic sculptural pieces with phallic heads with a pinched nose and slitty eyes. In these parts of the ancient world, obelisk like structures resembling the human penis were built, often with phallic symbols, representing human fertility and asserting male sexuality and orgasm. Phallic symbolism was prevalent in the architecture of ancient Babylonia, and in Khametian iconography, the obelisk was considered to be symbolic of the phallus of the masculine earth.

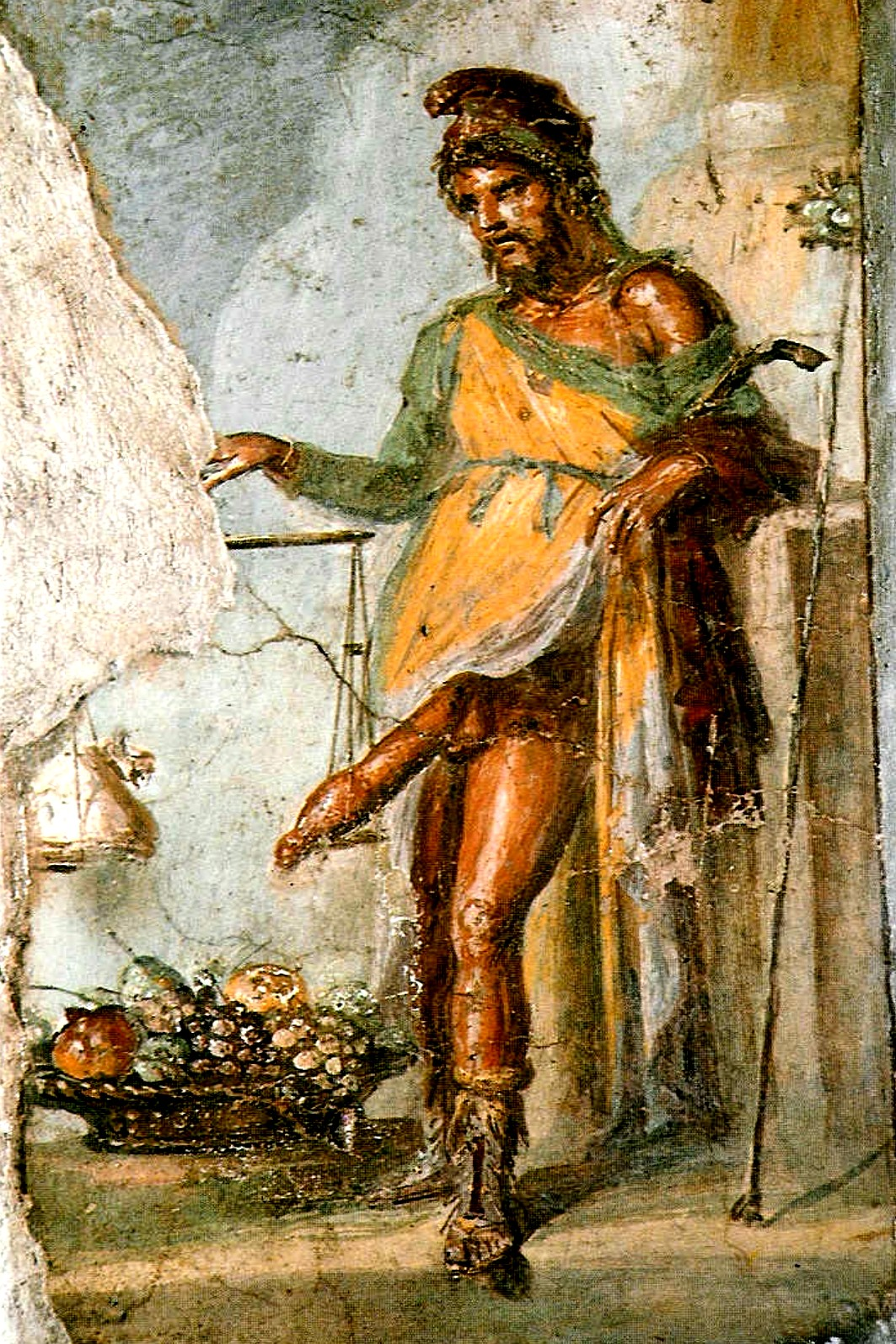
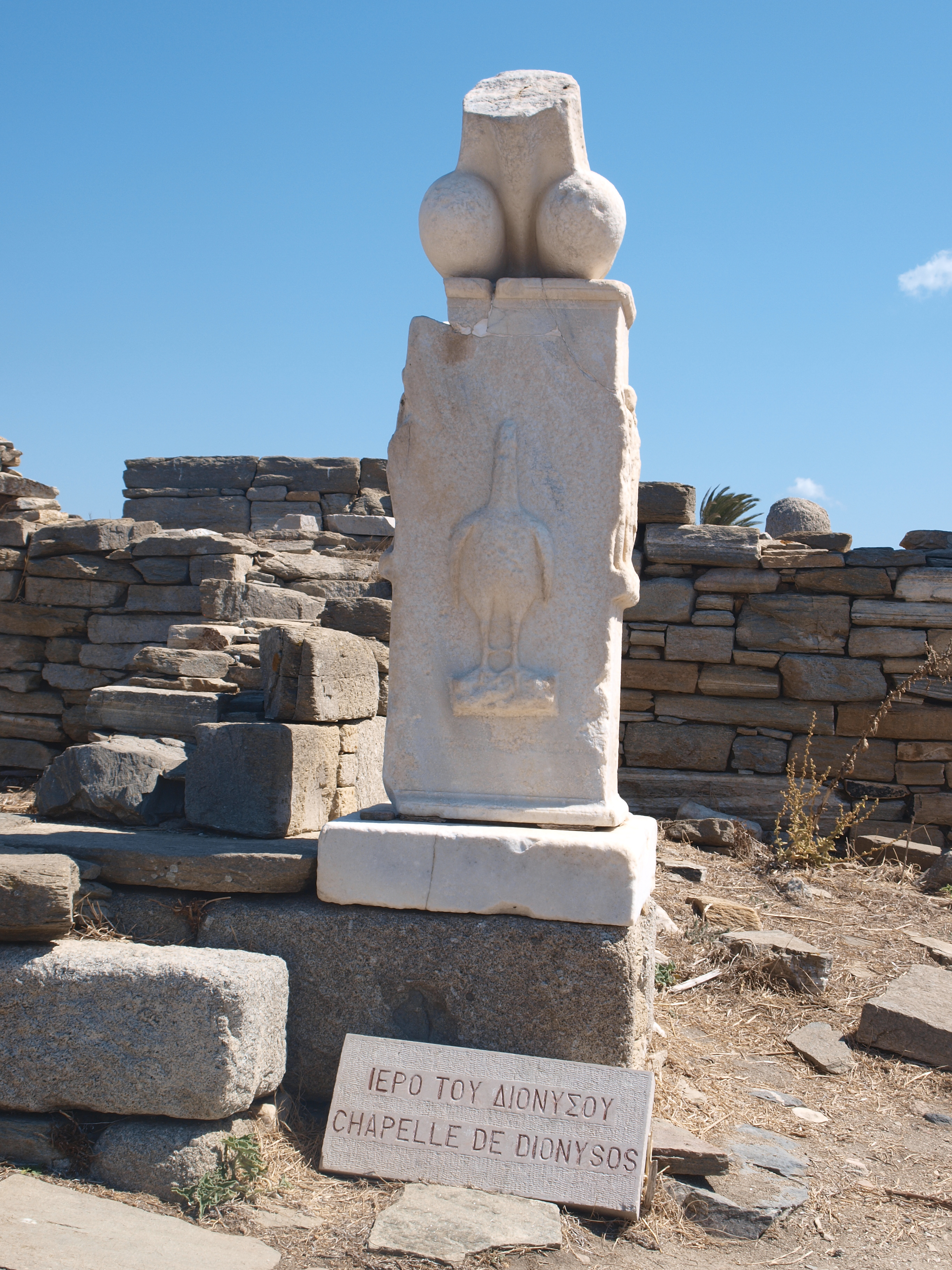
Left: The well-endowed Priapus, the Greco-Roman god of fertility. He was the subject of many architectural works in the ancient world. Right: A phallic column in Delos

Although phallic architecture as individual pieces was not prevalent in ancient Rome as it was in ancient Greece or Egypt, the Romans were deeply superstitious and often introduced phallus-related components as architectural pieces and domestic items. Archaeologists unearthing a site in Pompei discovered many vases, ornaments and sculptures unearthed revealing the preoccupation with the phallus, also unearthing an 18-inch terracotta phallus protruding from what was believed to have been a bakery with the inscription, "Hic habitat felicitas" (here dwells happiness), and many Romans wore phallus amulets to ward off the evil-eye. Roman boys wore a phallic bulla until they came of age.

Priapic worship amongst the women of Sicily continued into the 18th century; worshiping phallic votive objects and kissing such offerings before placing them upon the altar in the churches. Fetishism with the phallus architecturally and in smaller implements was also exhibited by certain gnostic sects in medieval times, such as the Manichaeans, and was connected with masochism and sadism, a form of religious flagellantism. Smaller phallic shaped monuments in the form of idols, even vases, rings, drinking vessels and jewellery have been well-documented and could be found within medieval churches of Ireland.

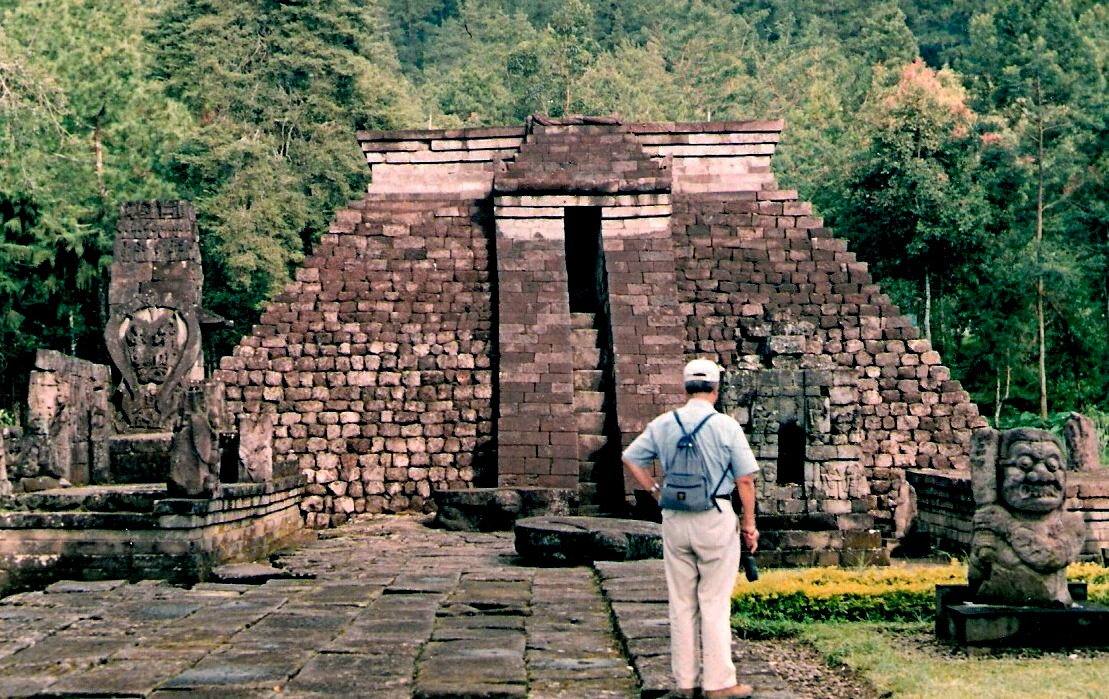
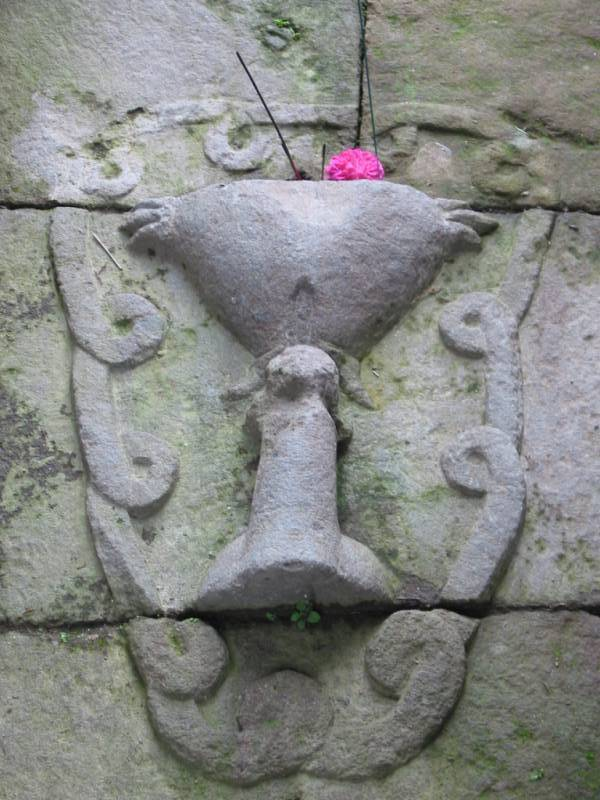
Left: The pyramid of Candi Sukuh of East Java, Indonesia. Right: A graphic depiction of a phallus entering a vulva at the temple, one of many.

In Hinduism, the Hindu trimurthi represents Brahma, the creator, Vishnu, the preserver and Shiva, the destroyer. Shiva, the main deity in India, is both destroyer and is stated to also include his role of creation; this creation role is represented by the phallic symbol, known as lingam in which form he is worshiped or in the form of male trinity of penis and two testicles. The linga, or phallus, is a common feature of Hindu temples across India, engrained as reliefs or other forms. The Brihadeeswarar Temple of Tanjore in Tamil Nadu, built during the Chola Dynasty, is dedicated to Shiva, and features lingam between the cells; it is especially renowned for its "Hall of One Thousand Lingas".

In Indonesia, the phallic lingga and feminine yoni, remain common symbols of harmony. The Sultan's Palace of Kasepuhan, in West Java, has a number of lingga-yoni carvings along its walls. According to the Indonesian chronicles of the Babad Tanah Jawi, Prince Puger gained the kingly power from God, by ingesting sperm from the phallus of the already-dead Sultan Amangkurat II of Mataram.

Candi Sukuh temple of Ngancar, East Java, was built in the 10th century and is dedicated to Shiva. The temple has numerous reliefs graphically depicting sexuality and fertility including several stone depictions of a copulating penis and vulva. It consists of a pyramid with reliefs and statues at the front. Among them is a male statue clutching his penis, with three tortoises with flattened shells. The temple once had a striking 1.82 metre (5'11.5 ft) representation of lingga with four testicles; this is now housed in the National Museum of Indonesia. Phallic references were also made in Khmer architecture in Cambodia, and several Khmer temples depict the phallus in reliefs.

In Africa, Ancient Malians, particularly the royals of Djenne, decorated their palaces with phallus like piers and columns at the entrance of their palaces and decorated the walls with phallus motifs. Similar features can be seen on the pillars of many temples across Africa, often interpreted by western scholars to be phallic symbols, but may often be more subtle and subject to varying interpretations. Like the ancient Egyptian pharaohs, Aksumite kings built temples with phallic pillars in ancient Ethiopian cities such as Konsu, and monolithic pillars with phallic representation have also been discovered in Madagascar. In ancient Maya, phallic architecture was rare but Uxmal in particular has a considerable number of phallus-like architectural pieces. It contains a temple known as the Temple of the Phallis and phallic sculptures and motifs.

=== Modern ===
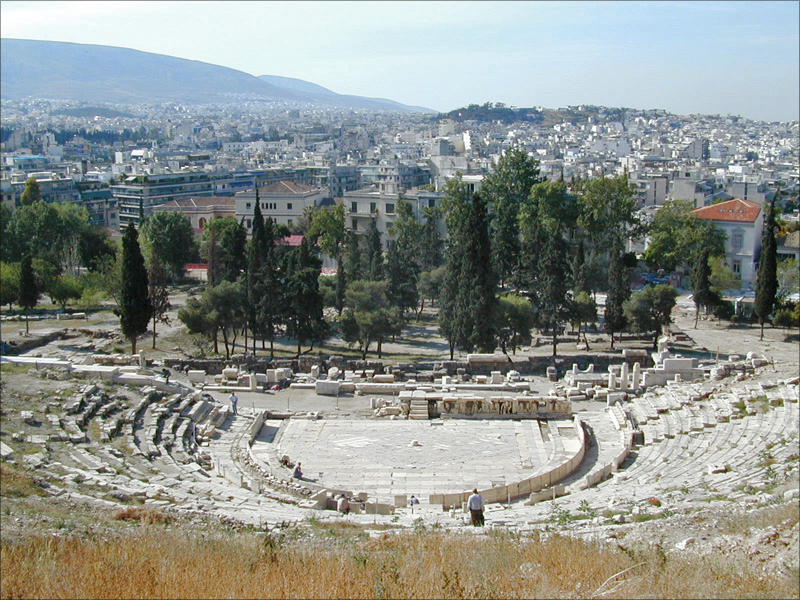
The Dionysus Theatre of Athens. Phallic columns of the ruined Ancient Greek theatre can still be seen.

Claude Nicholas Ledoux was a major exponent of architectural development in the 17th century which "articulated across the tensions of form and ornament, symbol, and allegory, dogma, and fantasy", at a time when western society was oppressive and particularly sensitive to public displays of sexuality; blatant and graphic phallic architecture would have been considered an embarrassment and a shameful act. In his initial draft for the House of Pleasure in Chaux (a proposed ideal city, near the Forest of Chaux), Ledoux drew upon allegorical ideas in his design with the union of man and woman, a physiological interpretation of intercourse and penetration. Private bedrooms were designed to "thrust out from the circular ring of the building, metaphorically representing penetration, the circular ring representing the vaginal passage and womb of the female.

The second revised design is said to "subliminate both elevated site and female gender" with a "lonely phallus", without the original planned animated circular ring representing the female reproductive organs. Ledoux drew upon phallic and sexually charged inspiration in other buildings which he designed. His design of Besançon Theatre for instance was fueled by the exigencies of prostitution and ancient sexual ritual. However, in comparison to the likes of Jean-Jacques Lequeu, who gained notoriety for his pornographic architectural concoctions, Ledoux's architectural inspiration was relatively mild, and he is said to have omitted towers from his designs on occasion as he was aware that they would be frowned upon shamefully by general society as a too obvious representation of the phallus; Ledoux's "missing erection" is explained to this effect in Jacques Lacan's The Significance of the Phallus.

According to Oscar Reutersvärd, the interest in neoclassical architecture in the 18th century was synonymous with and motivated by a similar interest in masculine virility. Works such as Francesco Colonna's Hypnerotomachia Poliphili (1467) and Giovanni Battista Piranesi's Campo Marzio (1762) show profoundly the ancient influence of phallic architecture in design and worship, and contain numerous illustrations of Priapic temples and architecture. Piranesi in particular is said to have offered a "prototype for the mysterious architecture of phallic worship that more closely resembles the houses of pleasure" in his etchings.

He located two designs for the Bustum Caesaris Augusti, concluding that they were based upon sexual ritual, with "two phallic plans penetrating the semicircular cubicula". Piranesi believed that the purpose of the phallic designs were to celebrate virility and male regenerative power. Other commentators such as Carl August Ehrensvärd also provided illustrations and analysis of Priapic temples and the meaning of phallic architecture. A work of note to this effect is Neoclassical Temple of Virility and the Buildings with a Phallic Shaped Plan (1977) of the Institute for Art History of the University of Lund, Sweden.

In America, especially in Chicago and New York, and numerous other global cities, high rise skyscrapers of phallic shape grew up in the 20th century. Le Corbusier, the famous architect, propagated it in Europe in place of traditional decorative architecture. Similar futuristic developments took place in Italy with the initiative of Sant'Elia, symbolizing the triumph of man. Yet unlike those of ancient times which were blatant architectural representations of the phallus, in the West in modern times "shrines to the phallus" are more subtle, and may often be subject to interpretation as such; very few architects have specifically admitted the human phallus as a source for their architectural creation. The Italian Fascists were cited as having an obsession with phallic architecture which was rigid and impermeable. In the last few decades the high-rise phallic skyscraper has been a symbol of government quest for economic power in China, Hong Kong and South Korea and the other ASEAN/Pacific Rim nations. China fuels billions of dollars annually into high-rise office and residential buildings with the aim of increasing GDP, at a rate far greater than they can be occupied.

== Symbolism ==
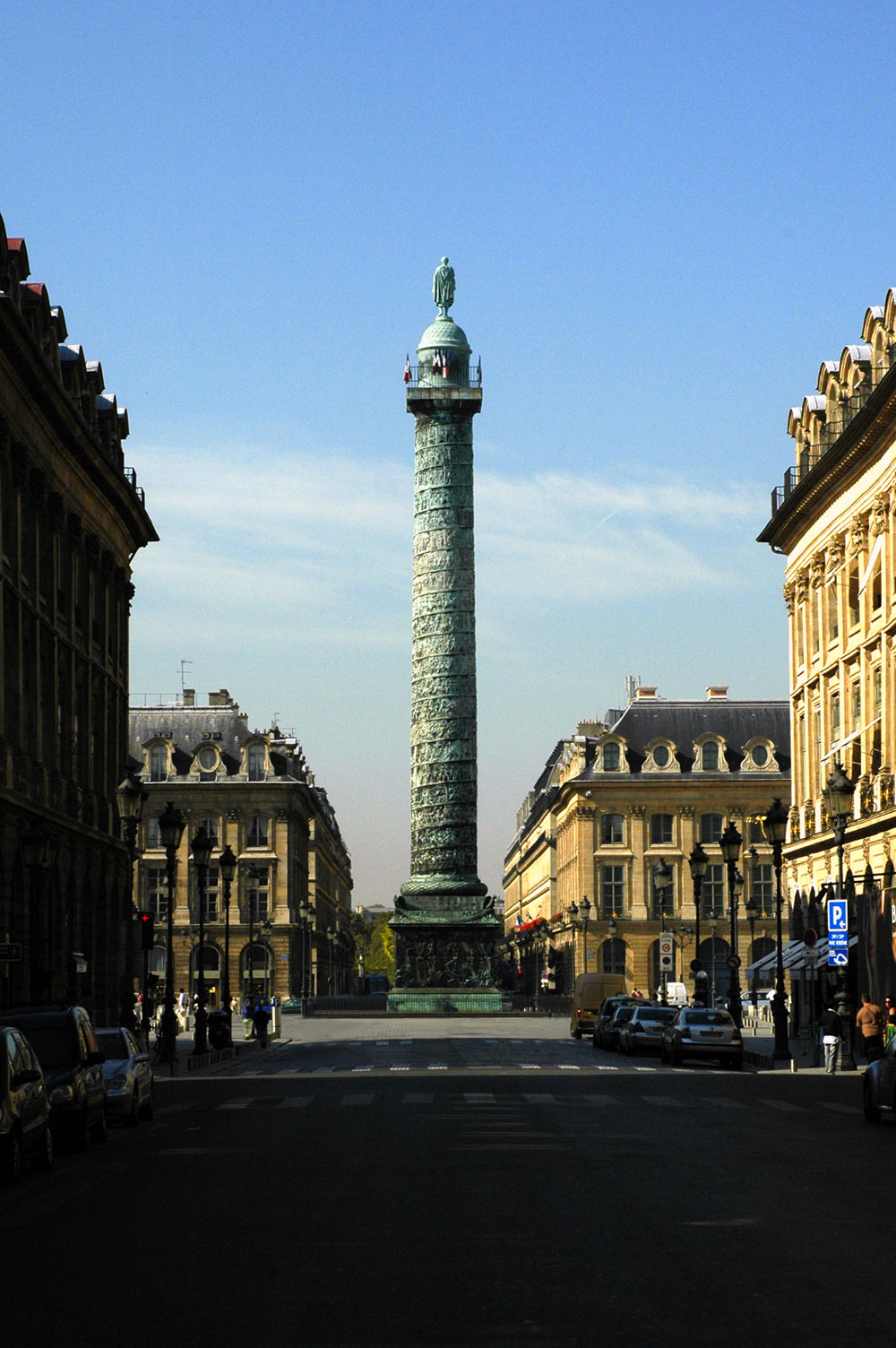
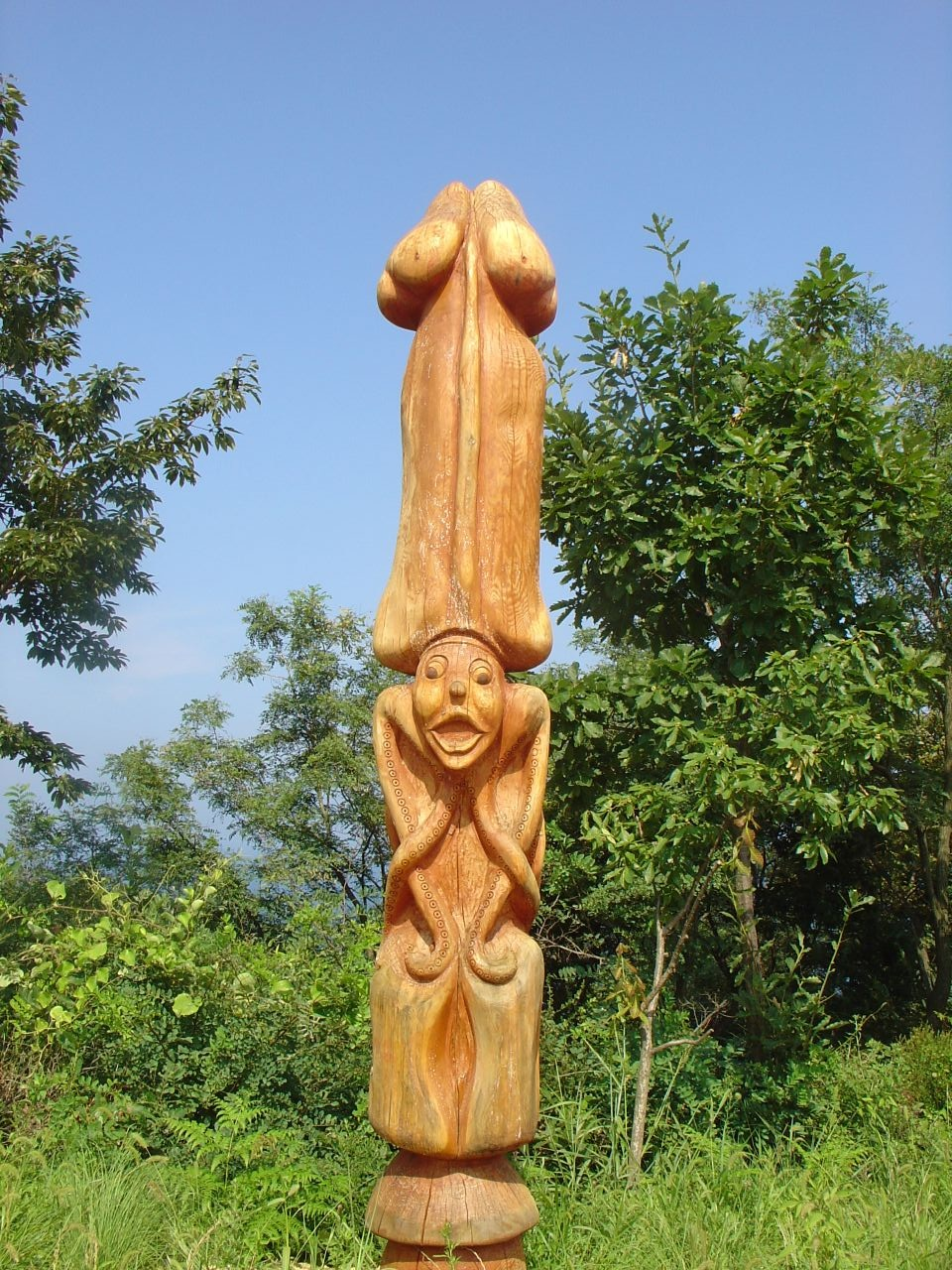
Left: Vendome Column, Paris. Right: One of the many penis statues of Haesindang Park (Penis Park), South Korea.

In art and architecture, acutely vertical buildings are often seen as a symbol of masculinity and horizontal buildings are seen as more feminine. The terms "phallic verticality", "phallic erectility" and "phallic brutality" have been referred to by architectural theorists, including the likes of French sociologist Henri Lefebvre, who argued that buildings of phallic architectural type metaphorically symbolize "force, male fertility, masculine violence". Phallic erectility "bestows a special status on the perpendicular, proclaiming phallocracy as the orientation of space" while phallic brutality "does not remain abstract, for it is the brutality of political power."

Lefebvre conducted considerable research into the meaning of high-rise buildings. He said "The arrogant verticality of skyscrapers, and especially of public and state buildings, introduces a phallic or more precisely a phallocratic element into the visual realm; the purpose of this display, of this need to impress, is to convey an impression of authority to each spectator. Verticality and great height have ever been the spatial expression of potentially violent power." Sigmund Freud metaphorically drew a comparison between "high achievement and the acquisition of wealth as building monuments to our penises."

In the 19th century, Thomas Mical argues that surrealists "capitalized on the phallic symbolism of monuments such as the ancient Egyptian obelisk from Luxor in the Place de la Concorde or the Vendome Column" by "supplementing these phallic structures with female counterparts". Jules Breton for example suggested moving the obelisk to La Villette abattoir and designing a large gloved hand of a woman holding the obelisk in a suggestive manner, and adapting the Vendome into a factory chimney with a nude woman climbing it. Auguste Bartholdi's 1870 monument Defense of Paris for instance, a commemoration of Leon Gambetta's escape from Paris in balloon during the Franco-Prussian War, was also subject to debate amongst Parisian artists of the late 19th century as they believed it resembled a testicle. Arthur Harfaux proposed turning the monument into "an enormous sex, the balloon forming a testicle and the phallus being horizontal", while Breton proposed turning it into copulating genitals, adding a twin balloon to form two testicles.

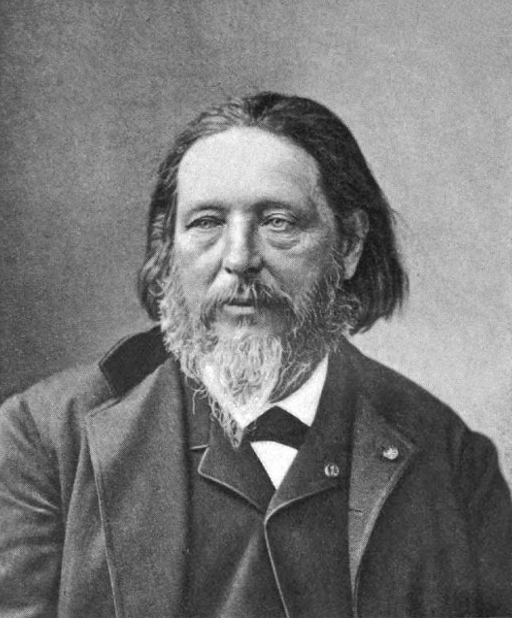
Jules Breton (1827–1906), a French realist artist who was keen to advocate phallic architecture in late 19th century Paris.

Contemporary scholars in architectural criticism have investigated the relationship between architecture and the body, sexuality, sex, power, and place. Feminists in particular, such as Margrit Kennedy, perceive high-rise phallic-like buildings on the urban landscape as "phallic symbols of male domination, power and rational instrumentality." Esther M. K. Cheung believes the form of monumental high-rise building which grew up in 20th century America can "be read as a phallic symbol of power". The present trend symbolises "Science and technology over nature, incorporating all the maleness which that with sci-fi utopias." Elizabeth Grosz, however, offers a counter argument to phallocentrism in urban design theories, saying "not so much the dominance of the phallus as the pervasive unacknowledged use of the male or masculine to represent the human. The problem, then, is not so much to eliminate as to reveal the masculinity inherent in the notion of the universal, the generic human, or the unspecified subject." Marc C. Taylor discusses phallic architecture and what makes a building masculine or feminine in his book Disfiguring: Art, Architecture, Religion.

=== Symbols and shrines ===
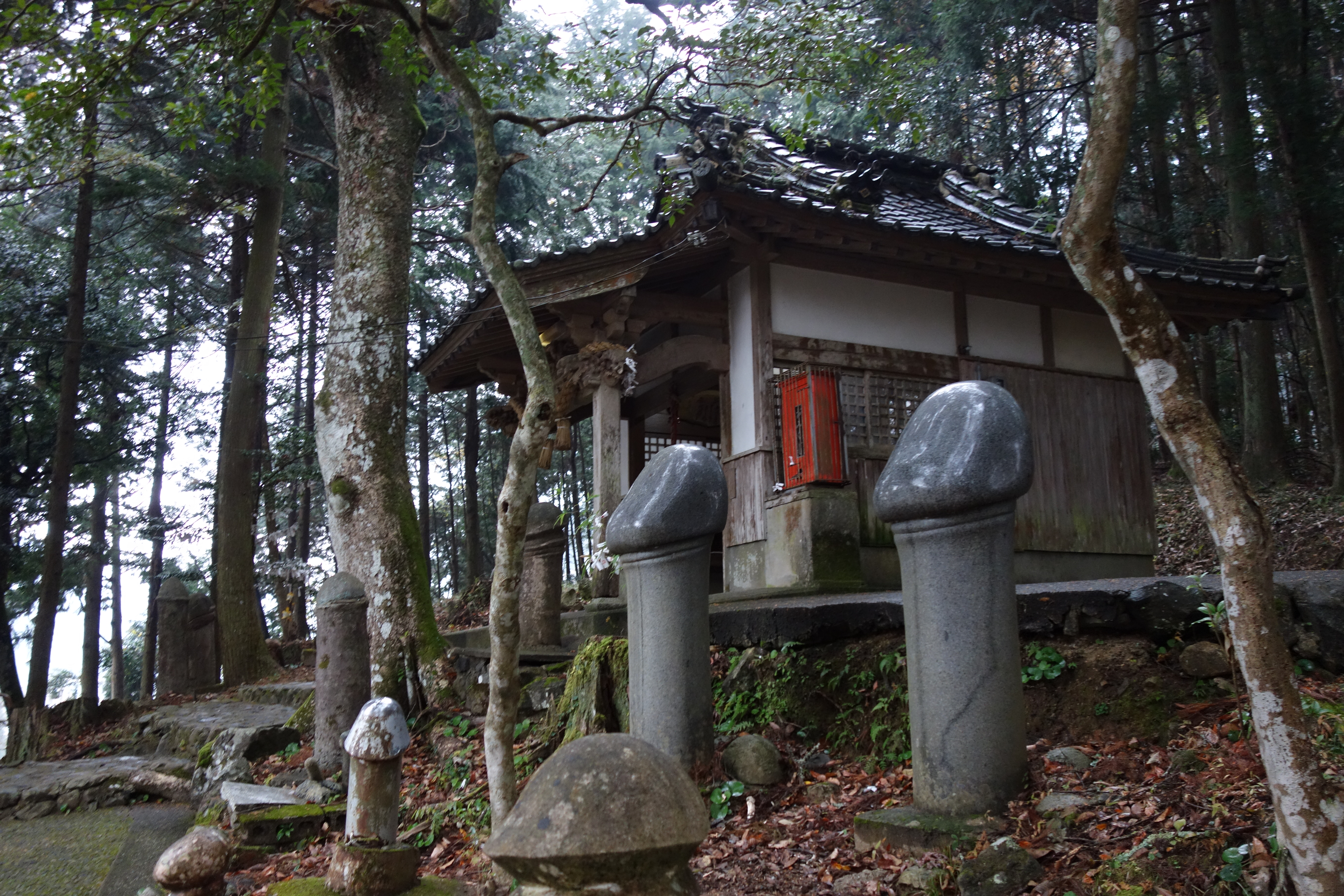
Marakan'non Shrine in Yamaguchi Prefecture, Japan. The phallic stones besides the shrine are considered symbols of fertility.

During the modern era, many sculptors have created some public phallic works of art, with varying degrees of subtlety. One of these examples may be the statue in honor to the Carnation Revolution on the top of a hill in Lisbon, Portugal by the sculptor João Cutileiro. Perhaps the greatest example of a phallic cemetery is the Khalid Nabi Cemetery in hills of northeastern Iran near the border with Turkmenistan, roughly 40 miles (64 km) northeast of Gonbad-e Kavous. According to a popular belief, the cemetery house the tomb of a pre-Islamic prophet, Khalid Nabi, who was born 40 years prior to the birth of Muhammad, in c. 530. The ancient graveyard contains some 600 tombstones of unknown origin, many of which are clear representations of the phallus; from a distance they resemble stone pegs.

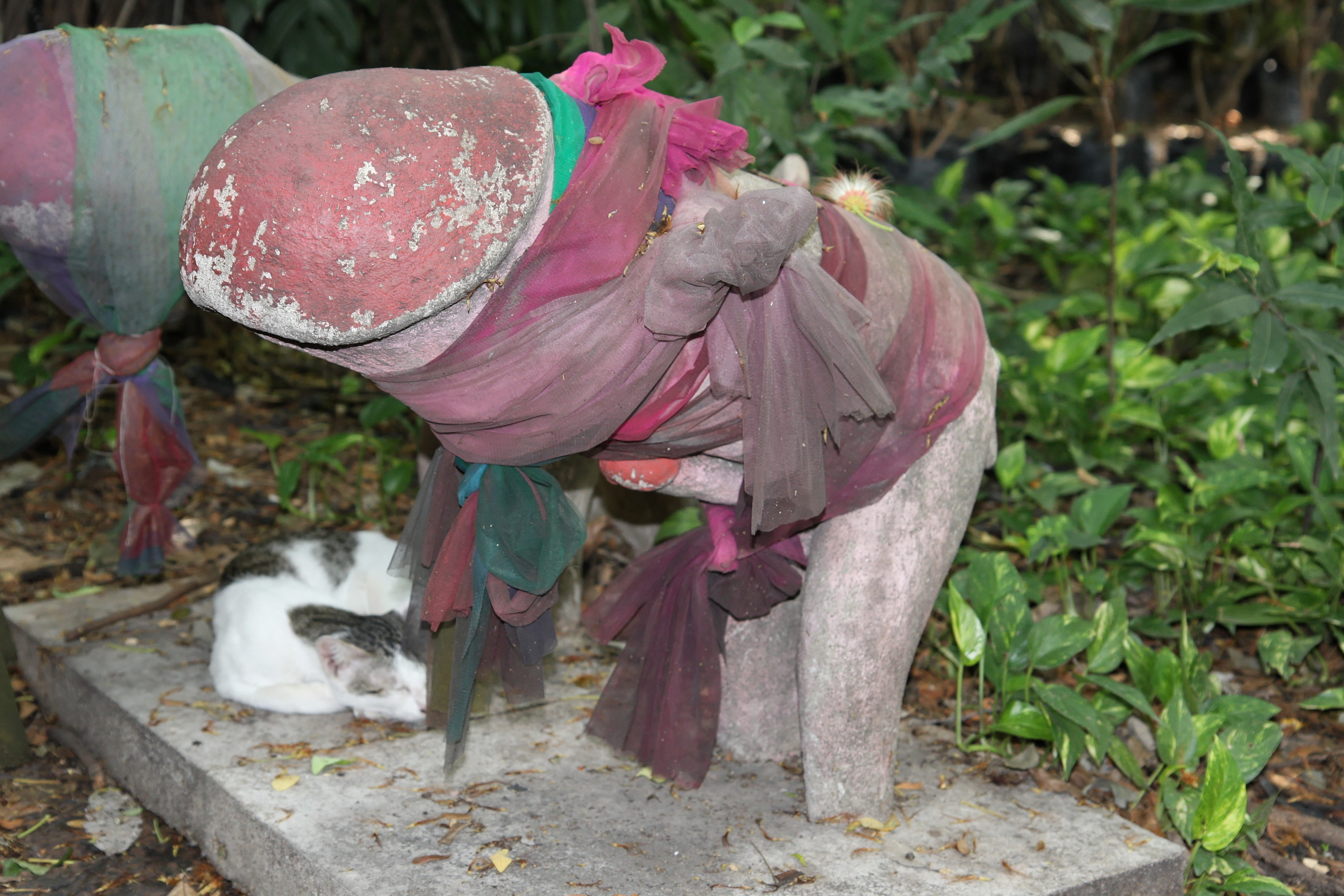
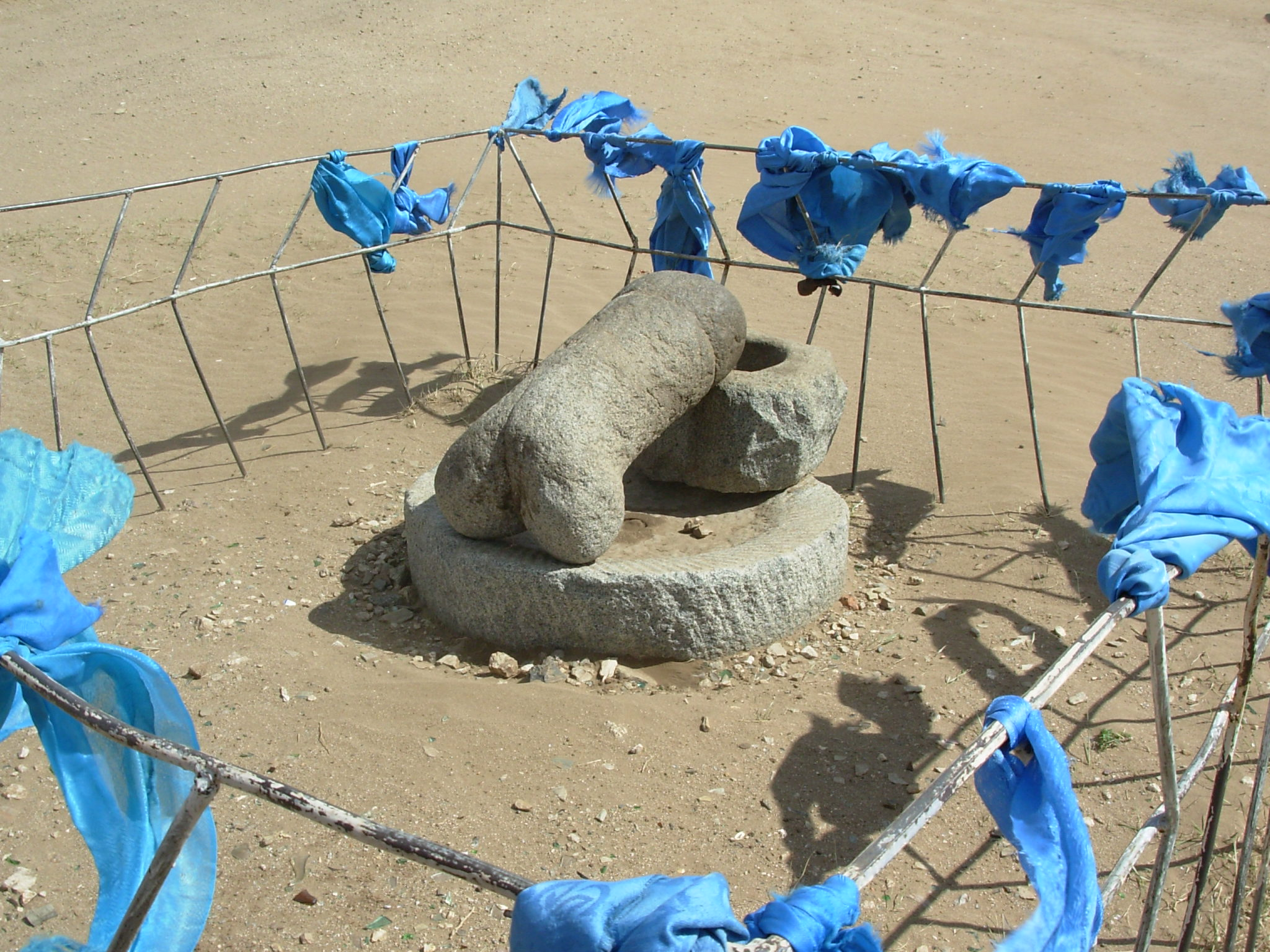
Left: Chao Mae Tuptim, Bangkok, Thailand. Right: A smaller version of the Kharkarin Rock, near Erdene Zuu Monastery, Mongolia.

Phallic shrines are common in Far East Asia, especially in Buddhist parts of Korea and Japan where they are seen as symbols of fertility or prowess. In Dragon Pool Temple in Jeju City, there is a phallic shrine which is visited by female pilgrims who come to worship it for its perceived fertility blessings. The phallic stone is made from granite, quite small in size and white and was reportedly found in a field nearby by a farmer.

In Thailand, the phallus is also considered to be a symbol of good luck and representative of fertility. There are numerous shrines in the country featuring phallic architecture. Chao Mae Tuptim shrine in Bangkok has over a hundred colored erect wooden penis statues of all shapes and sizes which are said to possess special cosmic powers and endow good fortune and fertility on anybody coming into contact with them.

Kharkhorin Rock, located in Övörkhangai Province of Mongolia, is a massive statue of a penis raised on a platform on the steppe near Erdene Zuu Monastery. The statue has dual functions; primarily it is a reminder to the monks to remain celibate, but it is also a symbol of fertility and human life. A smaller statue of a phallus is nearer the monastery. Haesindang Park (also known as "Penis Park") in Gangwon Province of South Korea, located about 20 kilometres (12 mi) south of Samcheok, is a nature park which contains a number of erect statues. A tragic legend shrouds them in that a virgin was once swept out to sea and drowned, unable to be saved by her lover. The townspeople were devastated and helpless, and a curse appeared to have been cast over them, ruining the local fishing industry. One day, a local fisherman relieved himself in the sea and miraculously the fishing industry revived. He discovered that her restless spirit could be appeased in such a manner, so the townsfolk compensated for the woman's inability to consummate beyond the grave by placing sexually potent phallic statues in view of the shore. The statues range in size and styles; some have faces on them and are more animated in appearance and more colorful, but others are exact depictions of the human penis.

In some Asian countries such as Bhutan, many have a belief that a phallus brings good luck and drives away evil spirits. Phallus symbols are routinely painted outside walls of the new houses and carved wooden phalluses are hung (sometimes crossed by a design of sword or dagger) outside, on the eves of the new homes, at the four corners. On a road drive from Paro airport to Thimphu explicit paintings of phalluses are a common sight on the white-washed walls of homes, shops and eateries. In the Chimi Lhakhang monastery, the shrine dedicated to Drupka Kinley, several wooden penises are used to bless people who visit the monastery on pilgrimage seeking blessings to bear a child or for welfare of their children. The glaringly displayed phallus in the monastery is a brown wooden piece with a silver handle, a religious relic considered to possess divine powers and hence used for blessing the spiritually oriented people. It is also said to prevent quarrels among family members in the houses which are painted with these symbols.

== Buildings and structures ==
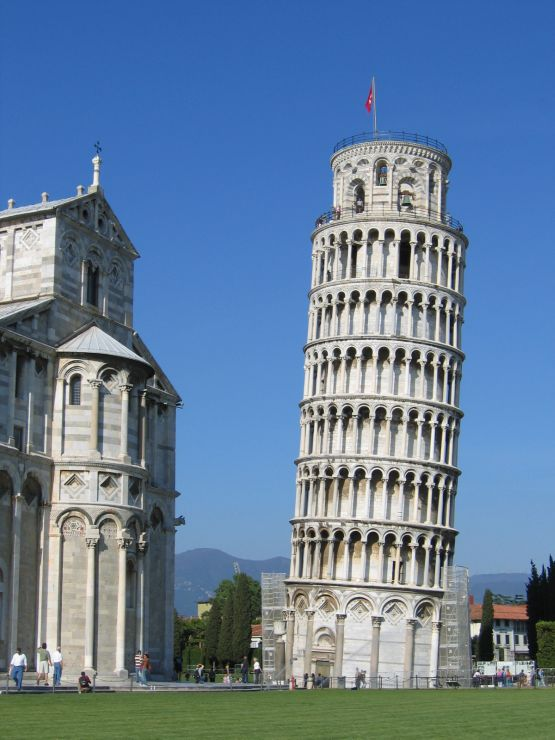
The Leaning Tower of Pisa

=== Leaning Tower of Pisa ===
The Leaning Tower of Pisa in Pisa, Italy, dating from around 1173, has long suffered from structural problems. The tower is eight stories high at 55.86 metres (183.3 ft) and before restoration work from 1990 leaned 5.5 degrees. It currently leans about 4 degrees but due to foundation problems it continues to sink about 1mm annually. The resemblance of the tower to a penis has seen the "Leaning Tower of Pisa" become a sexual slang term for a half-erect penis.

=== Nelson's Column ===
Nelson's Column, a monument to Admiral Horatio Nelson, was built between 1840 and 1843 to commemorate Nelson's victory at the Battle of Trafalgar. However the Nelson Memorial Committee ran out of money, having only raised £20,485 in public subscriptions. The column is Corinthian with a granite shaft. In his poem A Ballad of the Good Lord Nelson, Lawrence Durrell included the multiply allusive lines "Now stiff on a pillar with a phallic air/Nelson stylites in Trafalgar Square/Reminds the British what once they were."

=== Colonna Mediterranea ===
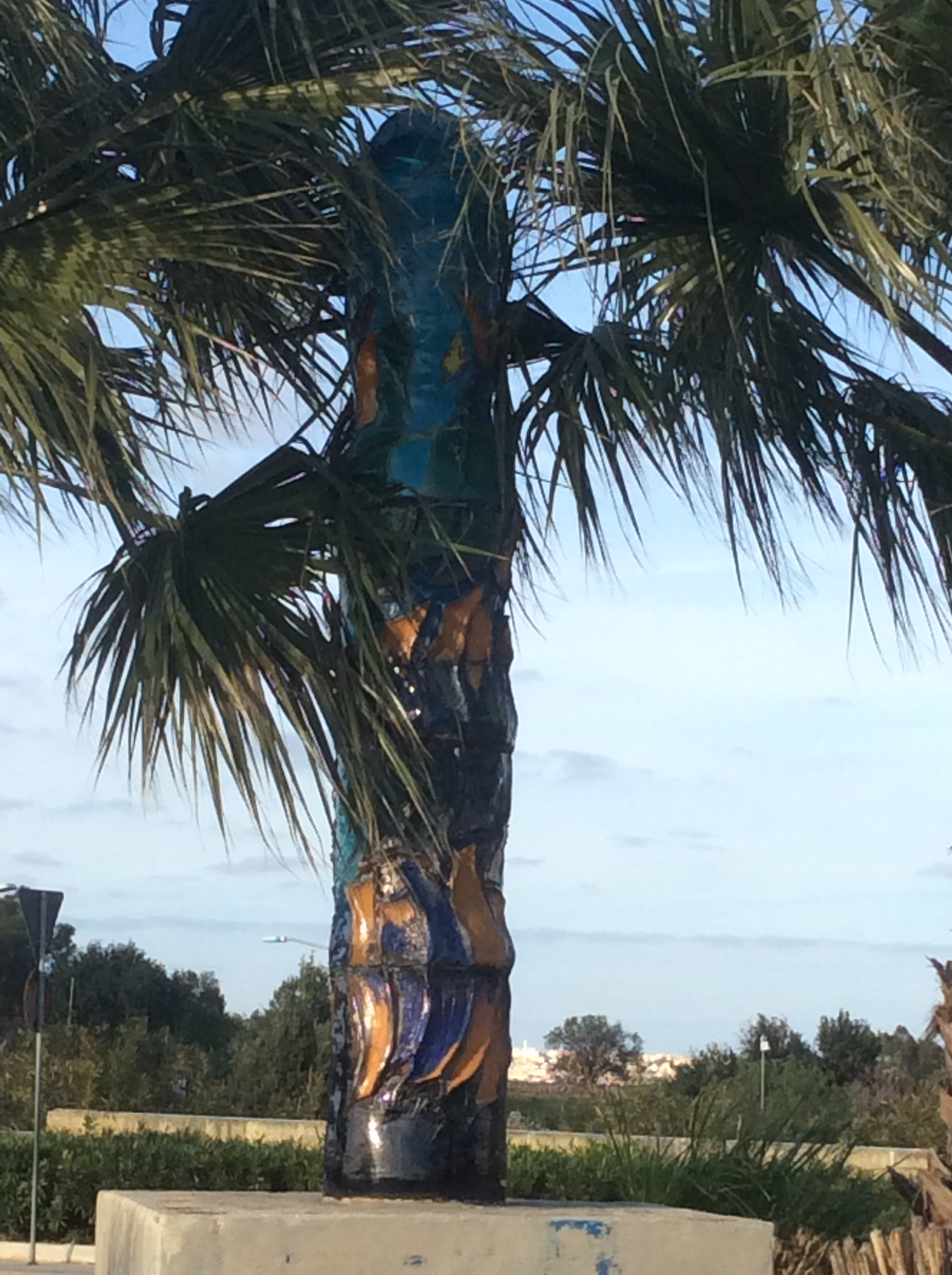
Colonna Mediterranea in Luqa, Malta

Colonna Mediterranea is a monumental column in Luqa, Malta. It has been described by its artist Paul Vella Critien as an "Egyptian symbol". However at a glance it could be observed to look similar to a large penis, and therefore was largely described to be a "phallic monument". The monument has managed to attract several international media coverage in specific before and during the visit of Pope Benedict XVI to Malta as the pope mobile, carrying the papacy, had been planned and passed by it. Similarly the same artist has created another monumental column, the Kolonna Eterna, which was also described as being phallic by critics.

=== Obelisk of Luxor ===
The Obelisk of Luxor, which stands in the Place de la Concorde of Paris, France, was given to the French by the Egyptians in the 1800s. The 23-meter (75-foot) obelisk originally stood at the front of Luxor Temple, honoring Ramses II, pharaoh of the Nineteenth Dynasty of Egypt. According to Michael D. Garval, the French perceived the obelisk as "prodigiously phallic" from the moment it arrived.

=== Oriental Pearl TV Tower ===
The Oriental Pearl TV Tower, located in Lujiazui, Pudong district, Shanghai, China, is the world's third tallest TV and radio tower at 468 metres (1,535 ft), the tallest such building in Asia. The tower houses restaurants, theaters, a conference hall, and a hotel and is a significant tourist attraction in the city. The tower has been met a mixed reception, however. The New York Times described it as a "great phallic monster of truly monumental ugliness, a bit like an enormous asparagus with a silver ball on top." The long steel column tower is considered by some to be proof of the city's phallic worship, and that such skyscrapers indicative of wealth are an increasing aphrodisiac of the materialist in Chinese cities.

=== Doha Tower ===
The Doha Tower, formerly called the Burj Doha or Burj Qatar was designed by French architect Jean Nouvel. In 2004, the project was first called the "High Rise Office Building". Following completion in 2012, it was originally called the "Burj Doha" by its owner, H. E. Sheikh Saud bin Muhammed Al Thani. The public has noted the building's "phallic form", suggestive of what Nouvel calls a "fully assumed virility".

=== State Capitol, Lincoln ===
The State Capitol building of Lincoln, Nebraska has been cited as the "apex" of phallic architecture. At 15 stories and 400 feet (120 m) tall, it is the second-tallest U.S. statehouse, surpassed only by the 34-story Louisiana State Capitol. It is the tallest building in Lincoln, the third-tallest in the state, and also the heaviest Capitol building in North America. The building was designed by Bertram Grosvenor Goodhue, who drew upon Classical and Gothic architectural traditions. It was constructed between 1922 and 1932, of Indiana limestone, with a golden dome. The building is nicknamed "The Phallus of the Plains" for its phallus-like appearance.

=== 30 St Mary Axe ===
30 St Mary Axe opened in London in April 2004. Designed by Norman Foster, the 180 metres (590 ft) structure, London's first environmentally sustainable tall building using recycled and recyclable materials, has been compared to the phallus and a gherkin, which also is a slang term for "small penis"; its nicknames include Gherkin, the Erotic Gherkin, Towering Innuendo and the Crystal Phallus. Also likened to a "phallic fat cigar", the building has been cited as a "crude anatomical metaphor", yet has become one of the London's most iconic buildings. Cabinet voted it the "Best Uncircumcised Building in the World".

=== Torre Agbar ===
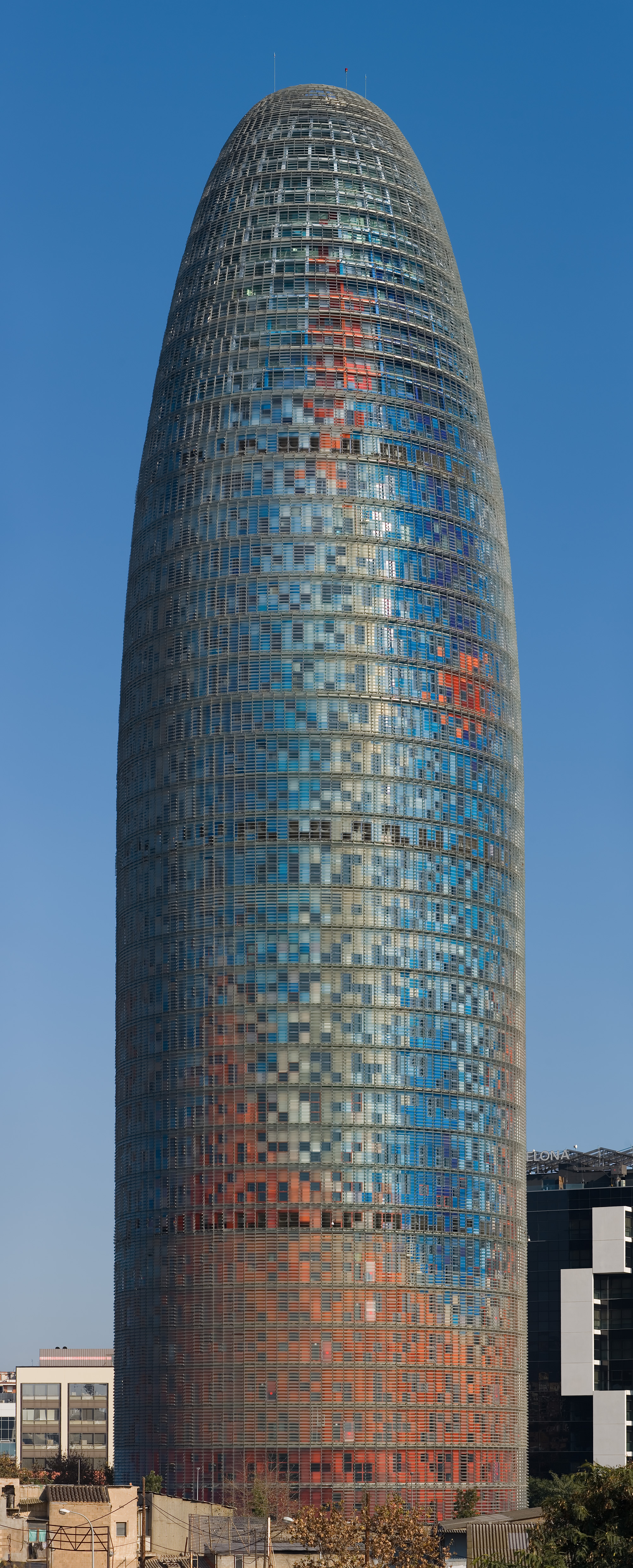
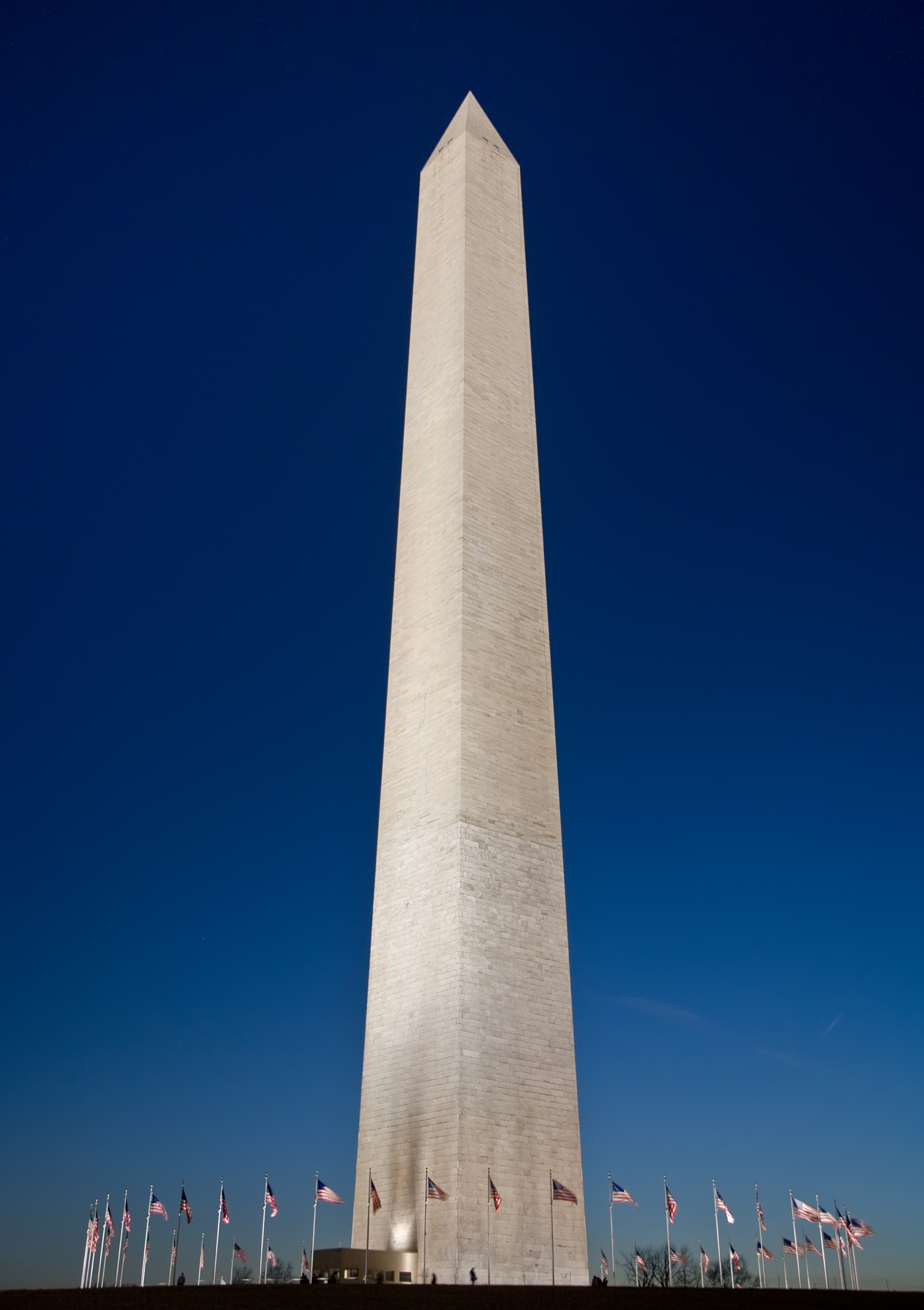
Left: Torre Agbar, Barcelona, Spain. Right: Washington Monument, Washington, D.C., United States

The Torre Agbar is a 38-story skyscraper located in the Plaça de les Glòries Catalanes of the Poblenou neighborhood of Barcelona, Spain. Designed by Jean Nouvel, it is named after its owners, the Agbar Group, a holding company whose interests include the Barcelona water company Aigües de Barcelona. An example of high-tech architecture in the city, its design combines a number of different architectural concepts, resulting in a striking structure built with reinforced concrete, covered with a facade of glass, and over 4,500 window openings cut out of the structural concrete. The building stands out on the skyline of Barcelona; it is the third tallest building in the city, standing at 144.44 m (473.9 ft), with an area of over 50,000 square metres, of which 30,000 are offices. 2,500 LED bulbs cause the tower to change color at night. It was officially opened by the King of Spain on 16 September 2005. Nouvel claims it to be inspired by a geyser and the nearby mountain of Montserrat, although he does note its phallic appearance. Although many draw comparisons with the phallus, locals refer to the structure as el supositorio (the suppository), a drug delivery system that is inserted into the rectum or vagina.

=== Washington Monument ===
The Washington Monument in Washington D.C. is often seen as a prime example of phallic architecture and American masculinity. The towering monument, made of marble, granite, and bluestone gneiss, it is both the world's tallest stone structure and the world's tallest obelisk, standing 555 feet 5 1/8 inches (169.294 m) according to the National Park Service. Construction of the monument began in 1848, was halted from 1854 to 1877, and was completed in 1884. In a Journal review, dated 17 October 1911, Arnold Bennett said of the monument, "Saw Washington monument. Phallic. Appalling. A national catastrophe – only equalled by the Albert Memorial. Tiny doll-like people waiting to go into it." Dan Burstein says of it, "Speaking of sex symbols, there is no more phallic symbol in existence than the Washington Monument, and the Capitol dome can be viewed as breastlike." James Webb used a metaphor to praise the "uplift[ing]" power of the Washington Monument as a white phallus, "piercing the air like a bayonet". In the futuristic film Hardwired, set in the United States where everything noteworthy is commercialized, the Washington Monument is used as a giant Trojan condoms billboard.

=== Ypsilanti Water Tower ===
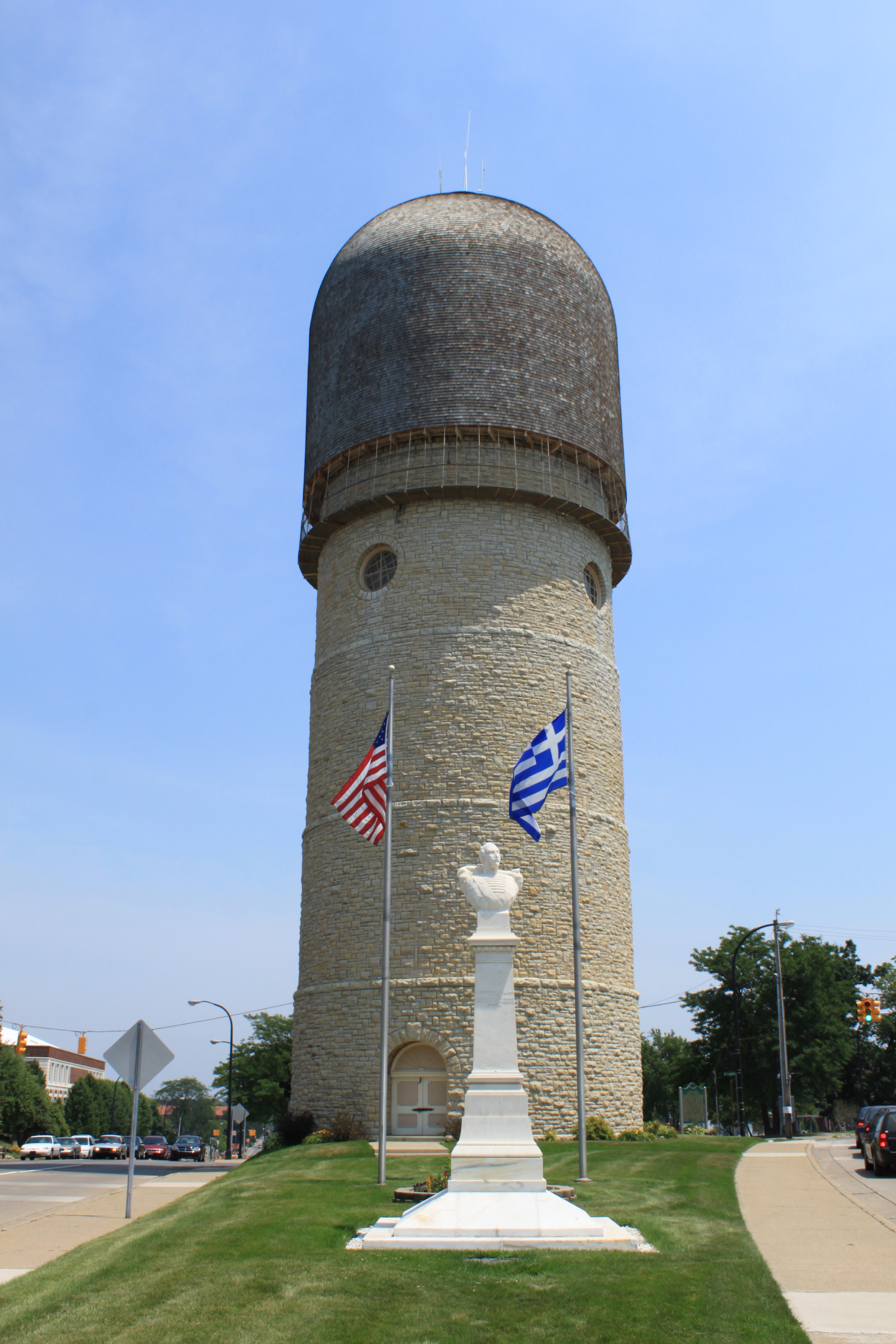
Ypsilanti Water Tower in Ypsilanti, Michigan, winner of the "Most Phallic Building contest"

Ypsilanti Water Tower is a historic water tower in Ypsilanti, Michigan, United States, listed as a National Register of Historic Places building in 1981. The tower was designed by William R. Coats and constructed as part of an elaborate city waterworks project that began in 1889. Located on the highest point in Ypsilanti, the tower was completed in 1890 at a cost of $21,435.63. Today the tower is frequently joked about for its phallic shape and has earned the nickname "Brick Dick".

It has become a well-known landmark in Ypsilanti, and due to the building's shape and location, the tower is frequently used by residents as a point for providing directions for visitors and residents. Iggy Pop said of it in a 1996 interview, "The most famous thing in Ypsilanti is this water tower made out of brick, about 175 years old. It looks like this big penis."

The World's Most Phallic Building contest was a contest held in 2003 by Cabinet magazine to find the building which most resembled a human phallus. The contest originated when writer Jonathan Ames drew the ire of Slate readers by claiming, in a diary that was later published in his book I Love You More Than You Know, that the Williamsburg Bank Building in Brooklyn, New York City, New York, was the world's most phallic. This led Cabinet magazine to initiate a search of its own to find which building was truly the "world's most phallic". Cities and readers subsequently poured in their views and staked their claims to the magazine's editors. After months of entries and discussion, the Ypsilanti Water Tower was announced as the winner, although the winner of a readers' poll was the Florida State Capitol building in Tallahassee. Another notable nominee was the Torre Agbar of Barcelona.

=== Hyde Park Obelisk, Sydney ===
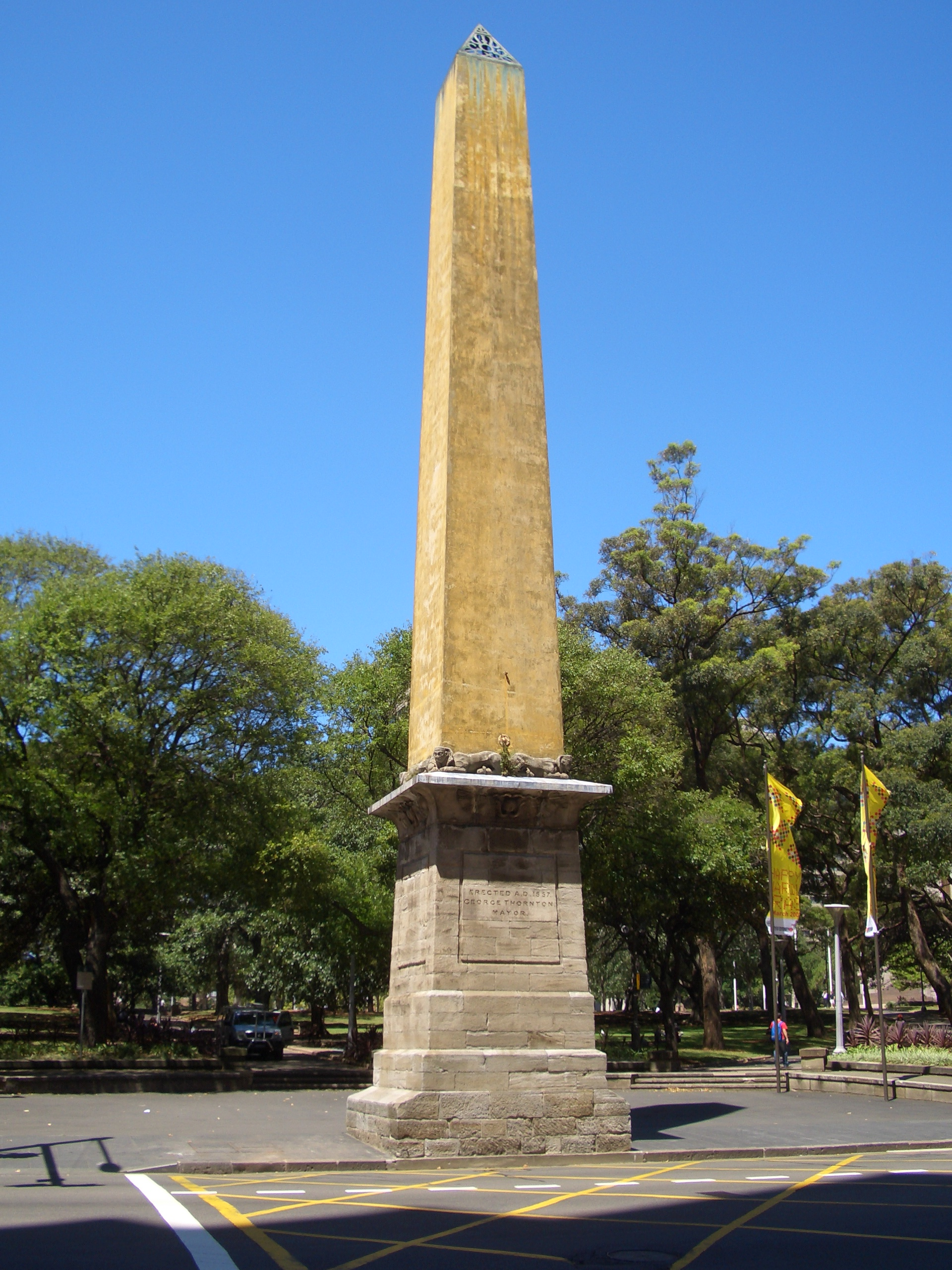
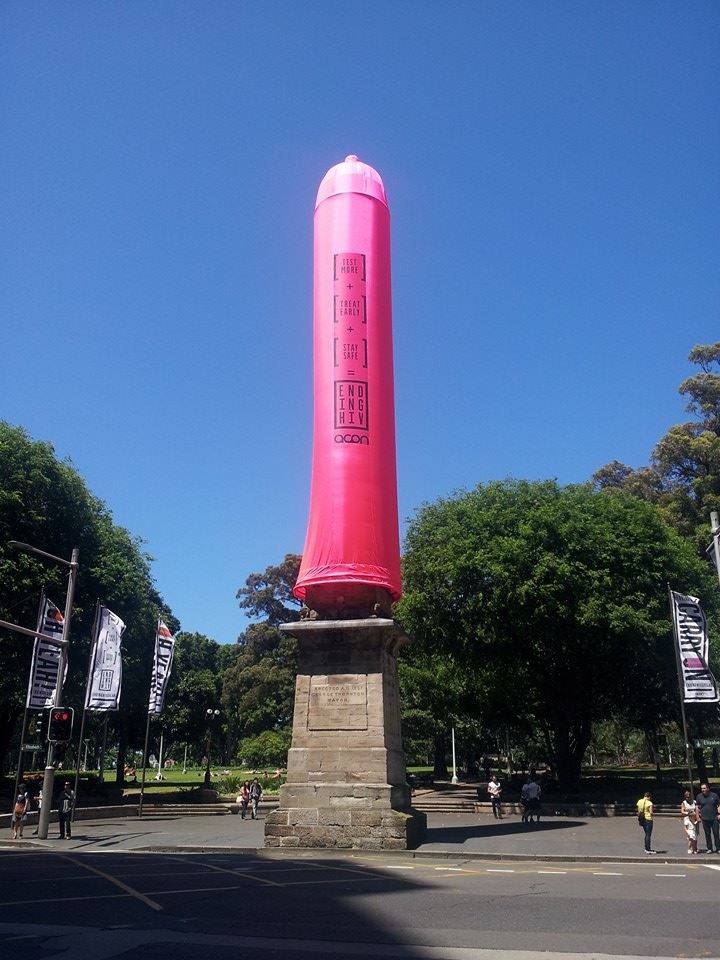
Left: Hyde Park Obelisk, Sydney. Right: Giant condom covering the Obelisk in November 2014

The 22-metre (72 ft) high Hyde Park Obelisk, located in Hyde Park, Sydney Australia at the intersection of Elizabeth Street and Bathurst Street, is both a former sewer ventshaft and a notable landmark in the Sydney CBD. Its phallic appearance was emphasised on 7 November 2014, when the AIDS Council of NSW (ACON) temporarily installed a giant condom over the Obelisk as part of a HIV awareness campaign. The installation generated a lot of media interest—including many phallic innuendos—and drew the ire of the Australian Christian Lobby.

== See also ==
- Norman Foster, Baron Foster of Thames Bank
- Phallic processions
- Phallus paintings in Bhutan
- Phallic graffiti
