= Kate Loveland =

Australian fertility researcher

Kate Loveland is an Australian fertility researcher.

== Profile ==
Loveland received her undergraduate and PhD degrees at Duke University in the United States, studying the molecular basis of mammalian fertilization. She then engaged in postdoctoral studies at Howard Hughes Medical Institute at the University of Texas, before moving to Australia in 1989 to join Monash University.

Loveland was a National Health and Medical Research Council of Australia senior research fellow (2000-2021) and is a Fellow of the Society for the Study of Reproduction. She is a Hudson Institute for Medical Research group head for Testis Development and Male Germ Cell Biology, and served as Head of Centre for Reproductive Health (2017-23). She served as Monash University Head of Graduate Research Studies, School of Clinical Sciences and Sub-Faculty of Clinical and Molecular Medicine (2015-2026) and is now Deputy Head.

Loveland has published over 160 peer-reviewed manuscripts, and was an Associate Editor for Andrology for over 10 years'. Her laboratory investigates the molecular and cellular mechanisms that underpin mammalian testis development and sperm production. The team's objective is to identify and characterize the molecular switches that regulate cell fate decisions in sperm precursor cells (germ cells) and in the somatic cells that support them. Specific research focus areas are : Signaling by activin/ TGFβ superfamily, immune cell contributions to testicular development and pathologies, growth factor/hormone signaling cross-talk, and the contribution of regulated nuclear transport molecules to cellular development and stress responses.

== Honors and awards ==
- Fellow of National Health and Medical Research Council of Australia Senior Research, since 2000
- Fellow of the Society for the Study of Reproduction
- Young Andrologist Award from American Society for Andrology, 2004
- Vice Chancellor's Award for Excellence in Postgraduate Supervision at Monash University, 2010
- Granted an Honorary Liebig Professorship from the Justus-Liebig University in Giessen, Germany, 2014

== Boards and committees ==
- Co-Chair American Society of Andrology Annual Meeting (2010)
- Founder (2010) and previous Chair of the American Society of Andrology (ASA)Basic Science Workshop
- past President of ASA Women in Andrology and Board member
- ASA Vice President/President/Past President
- co-Founder and Chair of Women In Reproductive Sciences (WinRS), Society for the Study of Reproduction (SSR)
- past Board of Directors member and Chair of SSR International Members Subcommittee for Society
- Annual Meeting Program co-Chair for Society for the Study of Reproduction. (2017).
- North American Testis Workshop Chair (2024) and Vice-Chair (2021).
- Society for Reproductive Biology (SRB, Australia and New Zealand) Program Chair, Treasurer and Board member.
