= Chao Mae Tuptim shrine =

Penis shrine in Bangkok

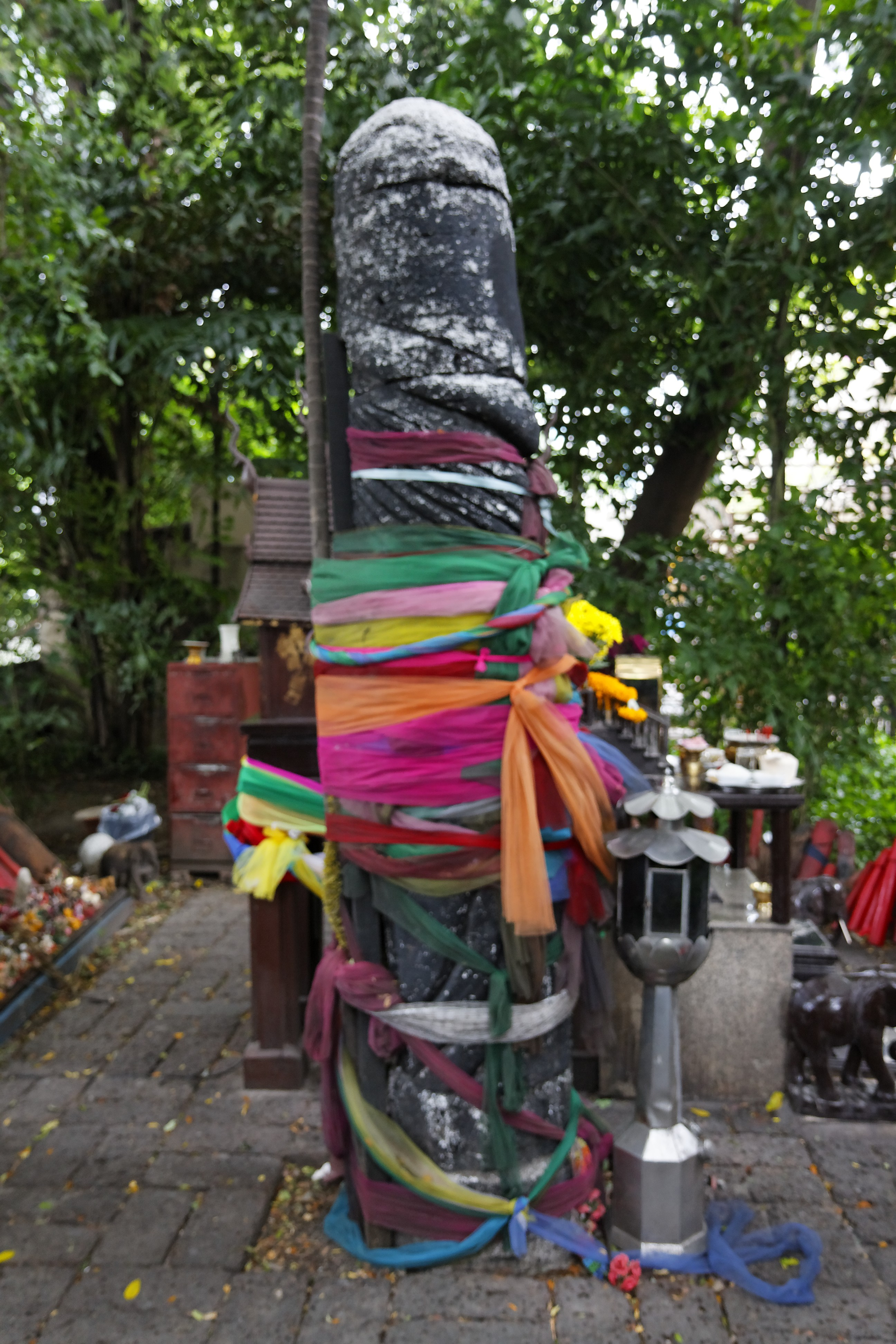
A 10-foot (3.0 m) penis statue beside the Spirit House

The Chao Mae Tuptim shrine (Thai: ศาลเจ้าแม่ทับทิม, RTGS: Thapthim, also known as Penis Shrine) is a phallic shrine in Bangkok, Thailand, located behind the Mövenpick BDMS Wellness Resort Bangkok near the bank of the Khlong Saen Saep. It was created in the first quarter of the 20th century by Thai businessman Nai Lert (1872–1945), who found a spirit house floating in the klong and placed it on the bank of his property. In Thailand, the phallus is considered to be a symbol of good luck and also a representative of fertility. The shrine is one of the best examples of intentional phallic architecture in the world. The site, which measures roughly 60 by 70 feet (18 m × 21 m), is now "crammed with carved" wooden penis statues, which are said to possess special cosmic powers and endow good fortune and fertility on anybody coming into contact with them. The size of the penis statues, which number well over 100, is said to range "[from] the size of a cream doughnut to the size of a canoe"; some are huge, some are humorous and painted pink to closely resemble a human phallus.

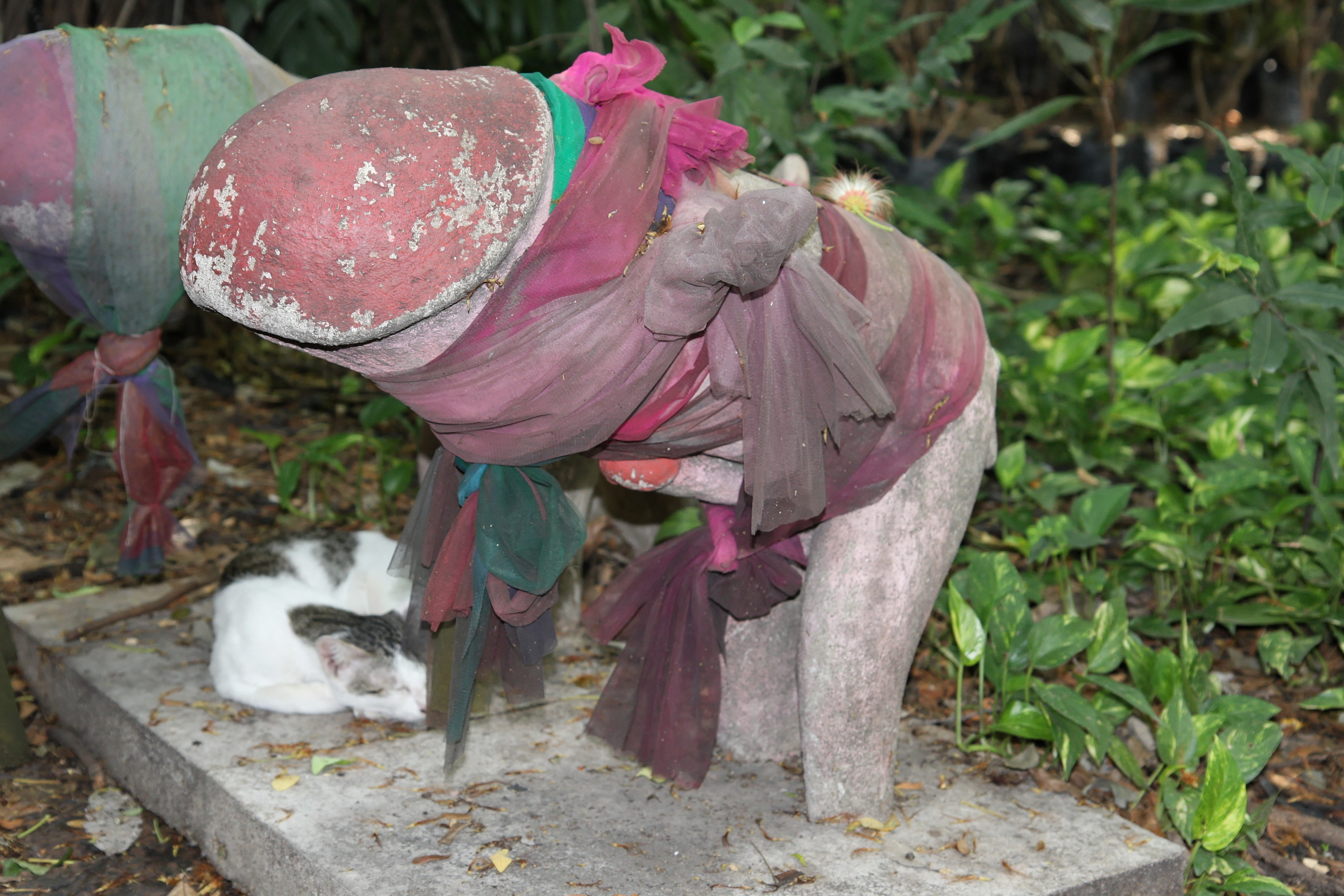
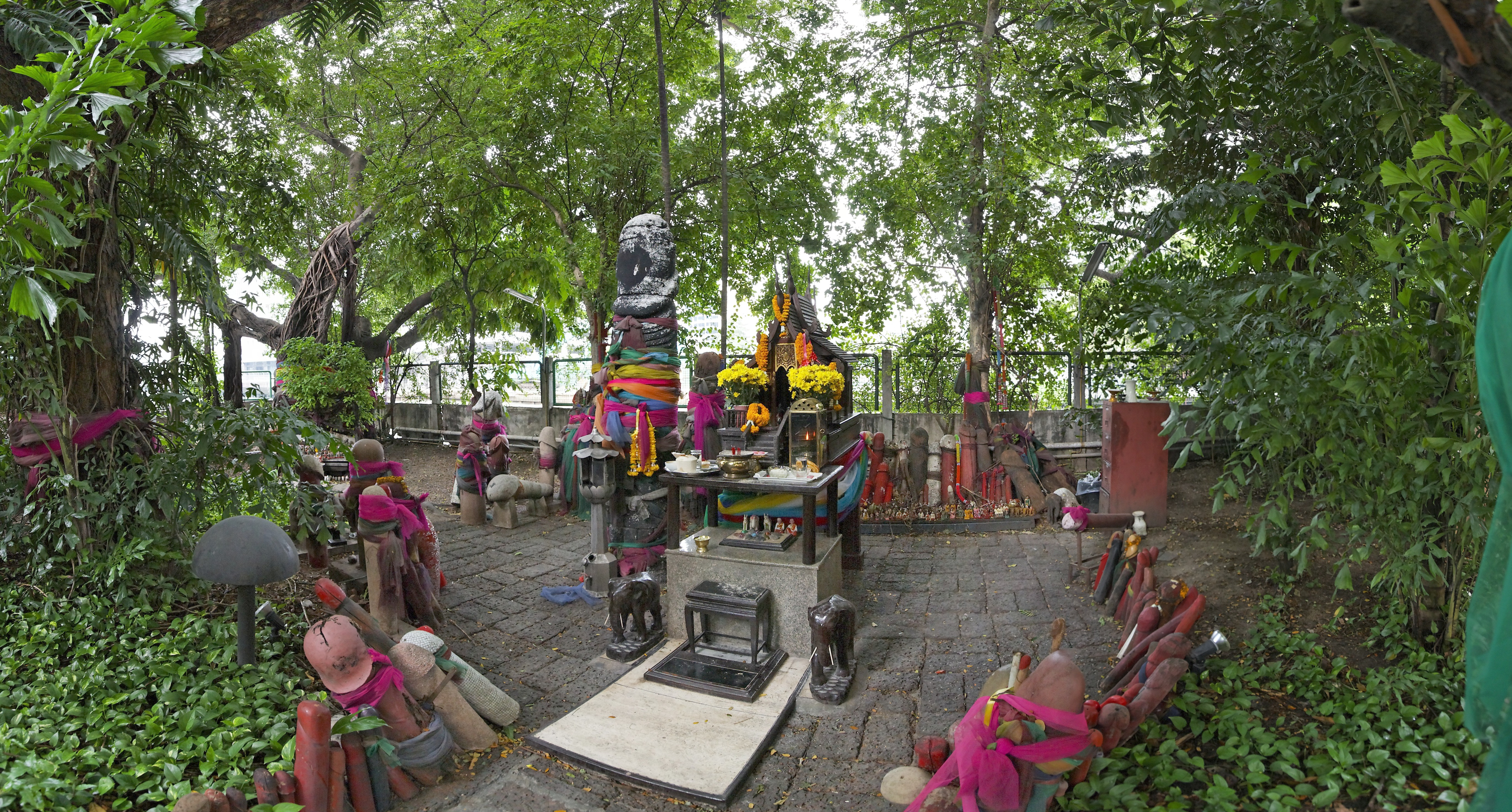
Chao Mae Tuptim, Bangkok

The shrine is named after Chao Mae Tuptim, a pre-Buddhist Southeast Asian tree spirit, who is said to bestow blessings on those who worship her at the shrine. The site attracts women from all across Thailand and even other east Asian countries. A plaque reads: "Chao Mae Tuptim has received yet another rather less conventional kind of gift, phallic in shape, both small and large, stylized and highly realistic. Over the years, they have been brought by the thousands."

Women hoping to get pregnant leave offerings at the spirit house, flanking a 10-foot (3.0 m) penis statue draped in cloth, including candles, jasmine, lotus flowers and Chinese incense sticks.

== See also ==
- Haesindang Park

== Bibliography ==
- Brockman, Norbert (13 September 2011). Encyclopedia of Sacred Places. ABC-CLIO. ISBN 978-1-59884-655-3.
- Guelden, Marlane (1995). Thailand into the Spirit World. Times Editions. ISBN 9789812041104.
- Hopkins, Jerry (15 May 2006). Bangkok Babylon: The Real-Life Exploits of Bangkok's Legendary Expatriates are Often Stranger Than Fiction. Tuttle Publishing. ISBN 978-0-7946-0224-6.
- Hoskin, John; Invernizzi, Luca (1990). Bangkok. Times Editions. p. 88. ISBN 978-1-55650-271-2.
- Moore, Christopher (1993). Asia Hand. White Lotus. ISBN 978-974-8495-70-5.
- Pilkington, Karl (20 September 2012). The Further Adventures of An Idiot Abroad. Canongate Books. ISBN 978-0-85786-751-3.
