= Loveland High School =

Loveland High School can refer to:

- Loveland High School (Colorado)
- Loveland High School (Ohio)
