= Haesindang Park =

Sex-themed park in Samcheok, South Korea

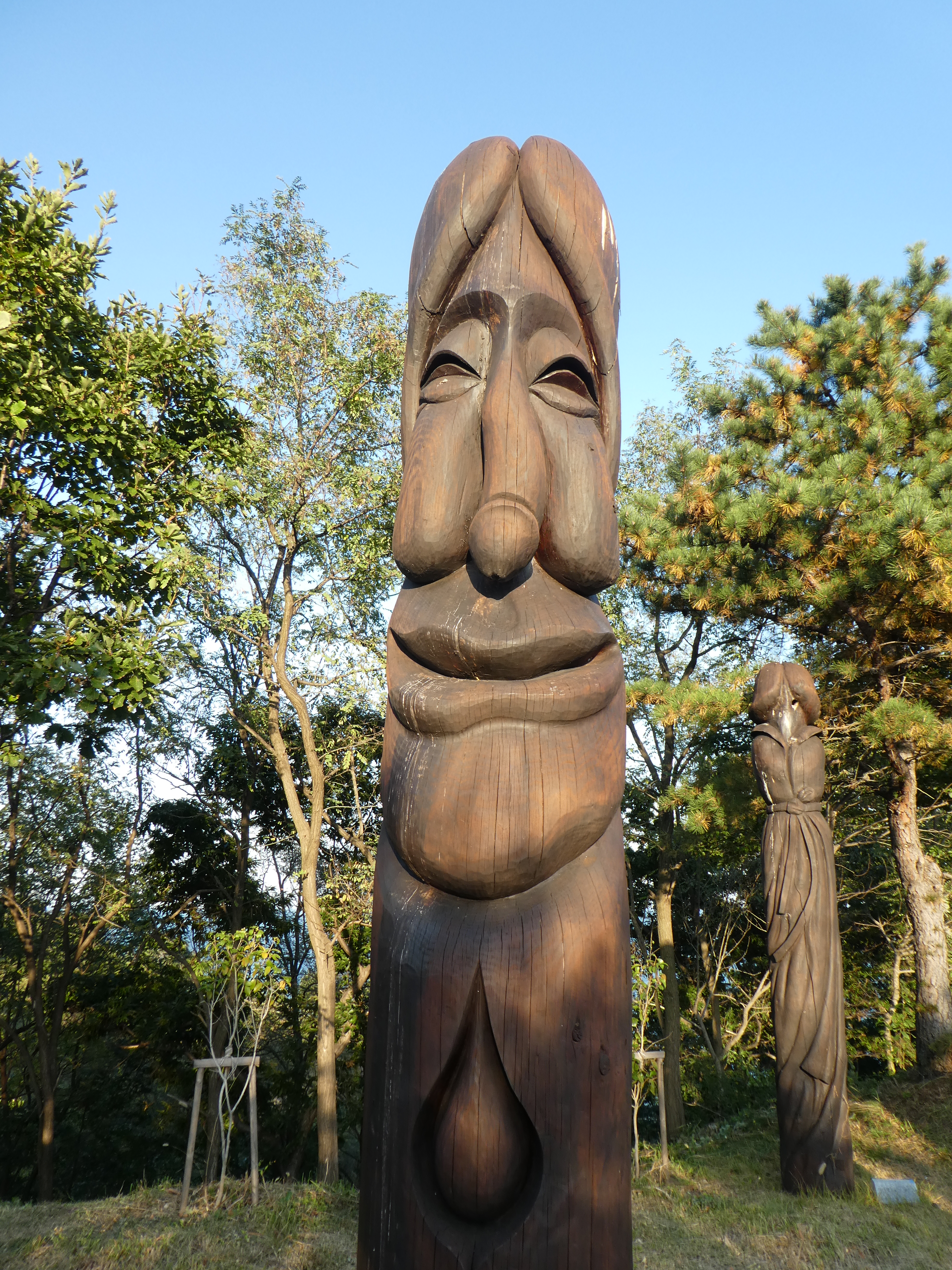
- A phallic statue in the park
- Interactive map of Haesindang Park
- Location: Samcheok, Gangwon Province, South Korea
- Coordinates: 37°16′8″N 129°19′35″E
- Theme: Human sexuality

Haesindang Park (Korean: 해신당 공원), also called Penis Park, is a theme park in Samcheok, Gangwon Province, South Korea. The park is noted for its number of phallic statues. The collection created by Korean artists features forms ranging from "hanging arrangements to three-meter tall trunks of wood", displayed for joy, spirituality, and sexuality. A small folk museum exhibits art objects exemplary of sex iconography in various cultures and time periods, shamanic rituals, and also the history of the Korean fishing community.

== Legend ==
A tragic legend known as the "Legend of Aebawi and Haesindang" shrouds the statues of the park. According to the legend, a woman was once left by her man on a rock in the sea while he worked. The man was later unable to retrieve her because of a storm, and the woman drowned. After that, the village people were not able to catch fish. Some said that it was because of the dead woman. One day, a fisherman ejaculated into the water, and afterward he was able to catch fish, so it was thought that exposing male genitalia to the deceased virgin woman pleased her. To soothe her spirit further, the local village people made several phallic wooden carvings and held religious ceremonies on her behalf. After a while, the fish slowly returned and the villagers were able to live comfortably again. The place where the woman died was named Aebawi Rock and the building where the religious ceremony is held twice a year was named Haesindang. The ceremony is still honored today as a traditional folk event.

== Exhibits ==
The location where the virgin girl died is called the Aebawi Rock and a biannual religious ceremony, a traditional folk event, also known as Haesindang, is conducted at a small building here. The seaward end of the park has a small shrine dedicated to the spirit of the virgin girl, and the park has a bronze statue about the legend. There are around 50 phallic statues exhibited in various sizes and styles; some have faces on them and are more animated in appearance and more colorful, but others are realistic depictions of the human penis. Near the cliff top there is a Chinese zodiac of sculptures in an arch with each animal carved inside of a life-size penis. Some of the sculptures are also in the form of park benches, drums, and even a moving cannon. These were created for an exhibition held at Samcheok during the former Penis Culture Festival. There is also a phallic red lighthouse on the dock. Additionally, the park is home to Korea's largest aquarium theater and an arboretum.

== See also ==
- Chao Mae Tuptim
