= Guillaume Boucher =

French metalsmith (fl. 1240–1254)

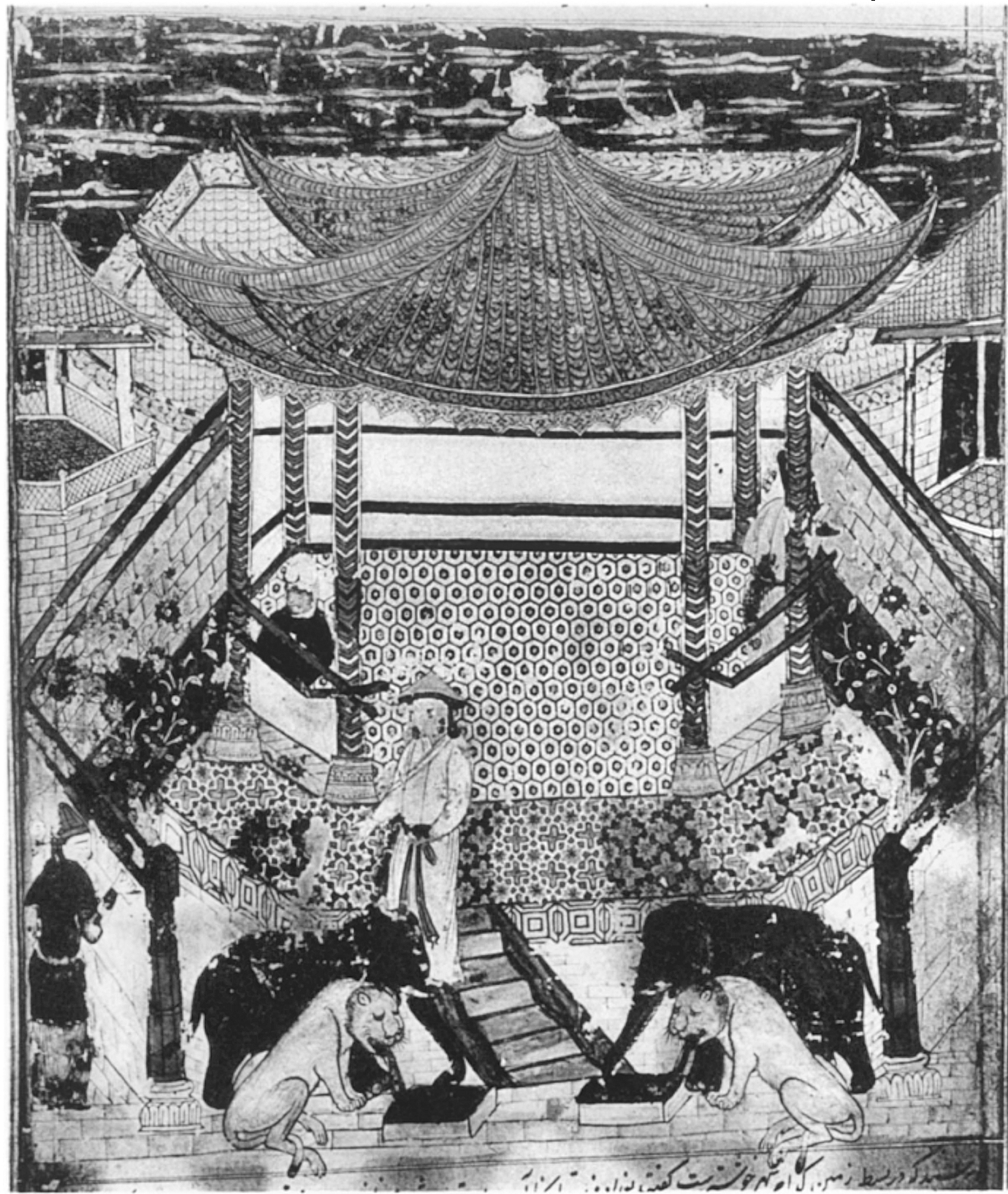
The pavilion called Frashi, built by order of Uktay Qa'an in the city of Qaraqorum with gold and silver statues made so as wine and qumiz, deposited in them, should run out of their mouths. Jami al-Tawarikh, late 14th century (Asiatic Society, D.31, Folio 2I verso)

Guillaume Boucher (fl. 1240–1254), also known as William of Paris and William Boucher, was a French metalsmith and artisan from Paris who lived and worked in Karakorum, Mongolia, during the reign of Möngke Khan.

== Biography ==
When the Flemish Franciscan missionary and traveler William of Rubruck reached Karakorum in 1254 on a mission from King Louis IX of France, he discovered a community of European Christians already present in service of the Great Khan, including Boucher.

Present with Boucher in Karakorum were his wife, "a daughter of Lorraine, but born in Hungary", and an adopted son "who was a most excellent interpreter". Boucher had been living in either present-day Belgrade, Serbia, or Gyulafehérvár, Hungary, when he was captured by Möngke's half-brother Böchek during a Mongol invasion in 1241 or 1242. According to a woman from Metz William of Rubruck met at the Great Khan's winter camp, Boucher's brother Roger still lived on the Grand Pont in Paris.

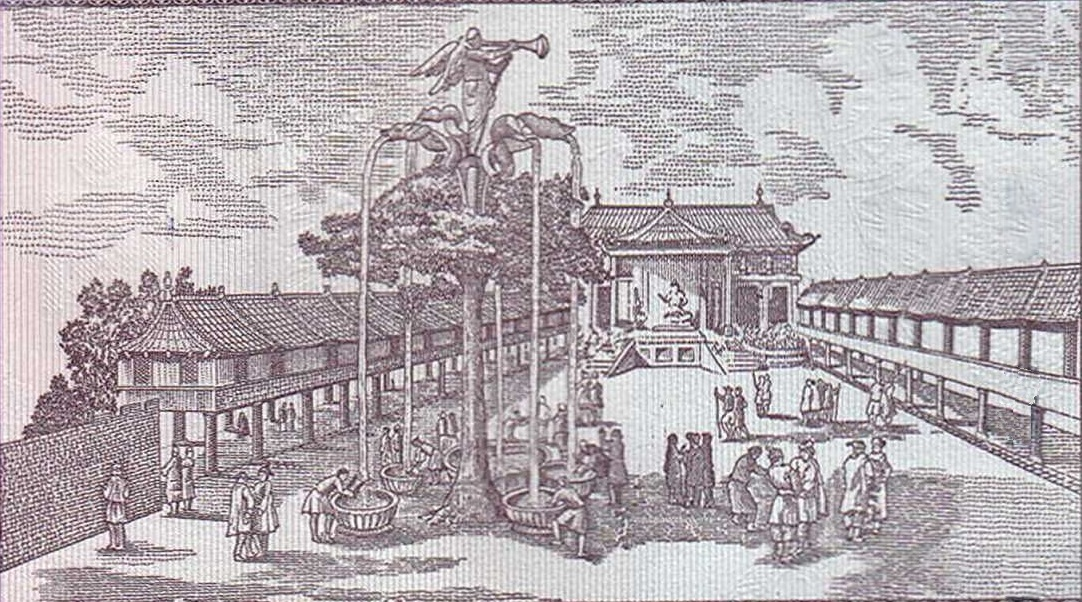
18th-century drawing of Silver Tree fountain in front of Tumen Amugulang palace

In addition to crafting jewelry for Mongolian women and altars for Nestorian Christians, Boucher's works included the Silver Tree, a towering tree-shaped mechanical drinking fountain sculpture outside the Great Khan's palace. The structure included a trumpet-blowing angel, four silver lions “all belching forth the white milk of mares,” and gilded serpents pouring wine, clarified mare's milk, bal (a honey drink), and rice mead into silver receiving bowls. While remains of the fountain are as of yet undiscovered, The German-Italian medieval and Renaissance scholar Leonardo Olschki believed some of Boucher's works may still exist in the Erdene Zuu Monastery, which was constructed from the ruins of Karakorum in the 16th century.

== Sources ==
- Guzman, Gregory G. "European Captives and Craftsmen among the Mongols, 1231–1255". The Historian, Vol. 72, No. 1 (2010), pp. 122–150. JSTOR 24455008
- Olschki, Leonardo. Guillaume Boucher A French Artist At The Court Of The Khans. Baltimore: Johns Hopkins Press, 1946.
- Rockhill, William Woodville, ed. & trans. The Journey of William of Rubruck to the Eastern Parts of the World, 1253-1255. London: Hakluyt Society, 1900.
- Uzelac, Aleksander. "Notes on the Capture of William Buchier by the Mongols in Hungary", Medieval History of Central Eurasia, No. 1, 2020.
