= Kharkhorin =

District in Övörkhangai Province, Mongolia

Kharkhorin Хархорин ᠬᠠᠷᠠᠬᠣᠷᠢᠨ
- Town
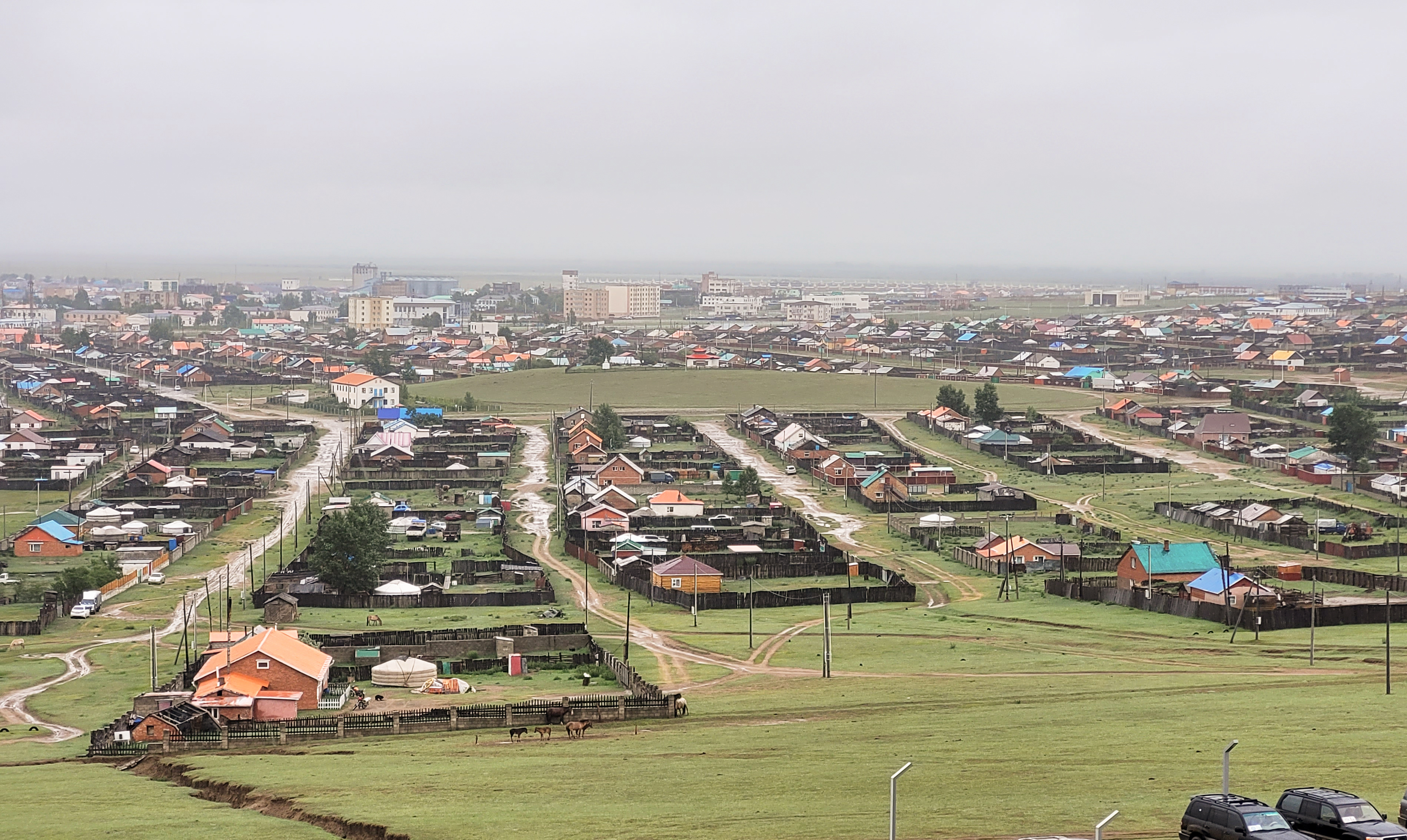
- View of Kharkhorin

- Location in Mongolia
- Coordinates: 47°11′50″N 102°49′26″E
- Country: Mongolia
- Province: Övörkhangai
- Sum: Kharkhorin

Population (2017)
  - Total: 14,765
- Time zone: UTC+8

Kharkhorin (Mongolian: ᠬᠠᠷᠠᠬᠣᠷᠢᠨ) is a town and sum (district) center in Övörkhangai Province in Mongolia. It is well known for being the capital of the Mongol Empire in the 13th century covering 23 million km^{2}. The sum population was 13,828 (1994), 13,964 (2000), and 14,765 (2017). The population of Kharkhorin town itself was 14,765 in 2017 and covered an area of 20.5 km^{2}.

Kharkhorin is located at the lower end of the upper valley of the Orkhon River which is included within UNESCO's World Heritage Site Orkhon Valley Cultural Landscape. The location marks the easternmost foothills of the Khangai Mountains, where they meet the rolling steppe of central Mongolia.

Nearby are the ruins of the ancient town of Karakorum (also known as Kharkhorum or Qara Qorum) which, for a short time, served as the capital of the Mongol Empire under Ogedei Khan, the third son of Genghis Khan. Another Kharkhorin landmark is Erdene Zuu Monastery and its famous phallic rock. The important Paleolithic archaeological site of Moiltyn-am is located near the bridge over the Orkhon River, just west of the settlement. A modern resort is south of Kharkhorin at Khujirt on the river.

Kharkhorin's principal sources of income are tourism and agriculture. Water from the Orkhon River serves to irrigate crops on the large plain east of the town.

== Climate ==
Kharkhorin has a dry-winter semi-arid climate (Köppen BSk).

Climate data for Kharkhorin, 1993–2010
Month	Jan	Feb	Mar	Apr	May	Jun	Jul	Aug	Sep	Oct	Nov	Dec	Year
Mean daily maximum °C (°F)	−10.9 (12.4)	−5.7 (21.7)	1.6 (34.9)	11.1 (52.0)	18.1 (64.6)	23.0 (73.4)	24.5 (76.1)	22.8 (73.0)	17.7 (63.9)	8.8 (47.8)	−1.0 (30.2)	−8.6 (16.5)	8.5 (47.2)
Daily mean °C (°F)	−16.4 (2.5)	−11.9 (10.6)	−4.7 (23.5)	4.4 (39.9)	11.2 (52.2)	16.4 (61.5)	18.5 (65.3)	16.6 (61.9)	11.1 (52.0)	2.7 (36.9)	−6.6 (20.1)	−13.9 (7.0)	2.3 (36.1)
Mean daily minimum °C (°F)	−21.9 (−7.4)	−18.1 (−0.6)	−10.9 (12.4)	−2.3 (27.9)	4.2 (39.6)	9.7 (49.5)	12.5 (54.5)	10.4 (50.7)	4.5 (40.1)	−3.5 (25.7)	−12.2 (10.0)	−19.1 (−2.4)	−3.9 (25.0)
Average precipitation mm (inches)	3.7 (0.15)	3.0 (0.12)	8.2 (0.32)	13.7 (0.54)	28.4 (1.12)	61.6 (2.43)	80.4 (3.17)	51.0 (2.01)	22.1 (0.87)	13.1 (0.52)	7.0 (0.28)	4.3 (0.17)	296.5 (11.7)
Average precipitation days	4.8	4.3	6.7	7.2	10.0	14.1	15.9	13.5	8.0	6.1	5.4	4.9	100.9
Source: World Meteorological Organization

== Administrative divisions ==
The district is divided into eight bags, which are:

- Erdenetolgoi
- Gangan-Orkhon
- Jalbaa
- Nariin Khur
- Ongotson-Ukhaa
- Orkhon
- Shankh
- Vangiin-Ovoo

== Infrastructure ==
With the absence of a centralized district heating system, the district center of Kharkhorin is heated by five private boiler houses, with the company TSTR LLC as the largest one, supplying 42% of the total heat consumed in Kharkhorin. All of the boilers are privately owned. It has a total capacity of 6.8 MW with the design heat load of 6.5 MW. The boilers use untreated raw water. The heating season runs 15 September through 15 May. All of the boilers of the Kharkhorin district heating system are powered by coal.

== Tourist attractions ==
- Erdene Zuu Monastery
- Erdenesiin Khuree
- Kharakhorum Museum
- Monument for Mongol States
- Shankh Monastery

== Transportation ==
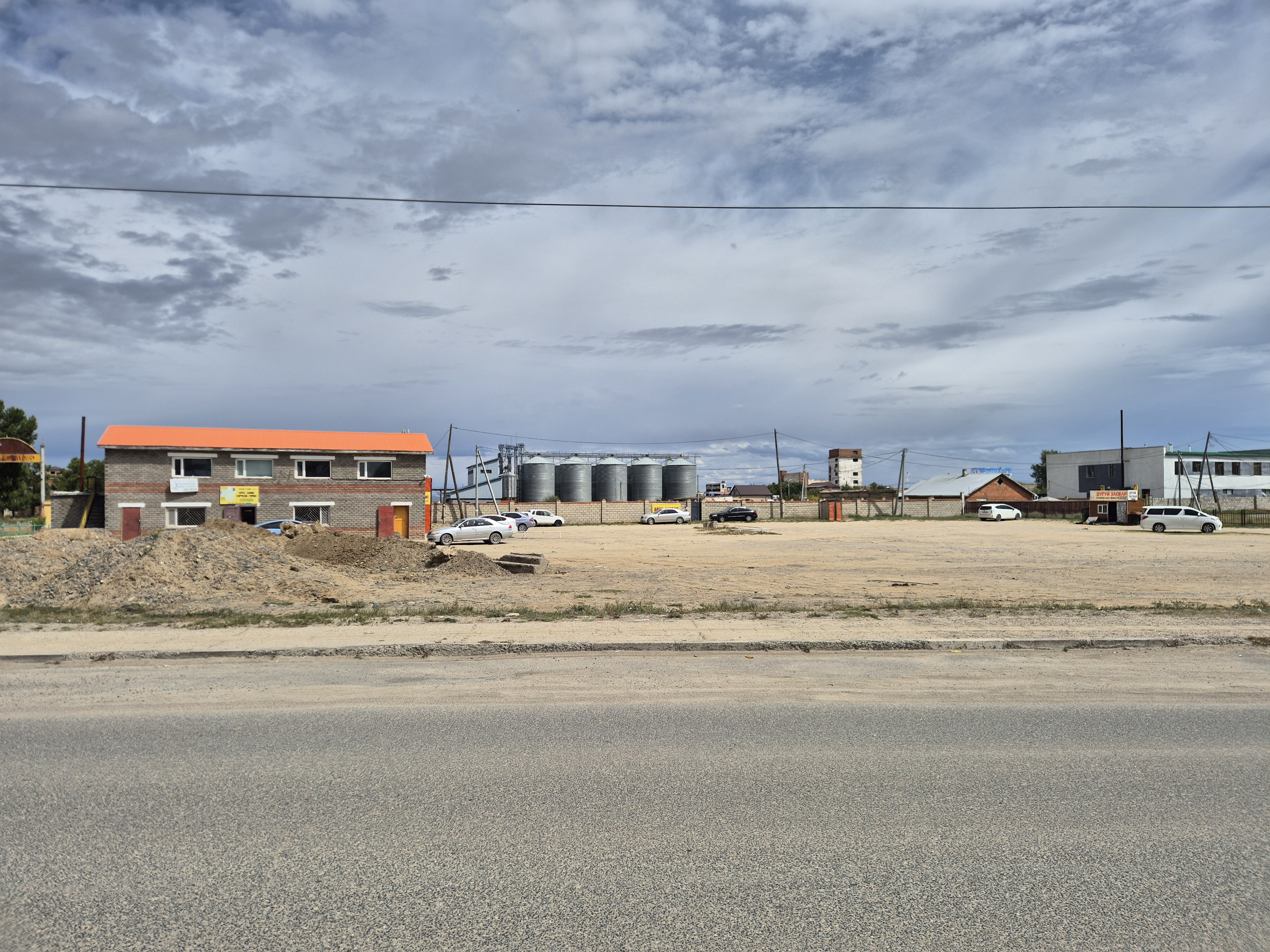
Kharkhorin Bus Station

The Kharkhorin Airport (KHR/ZMHH) has one unpaved runway and is served by regular flights from and to Ulaanbaatar. The district has a 8.2-km of paved road within the district center.

== Notable natives ==
- Batjargalyn Batbayar, politician
