= Monument for Mongol States =

Monument in Kharkhorin, Övörkhangai, Mongolia

- Монгол Нутаг Дахь Их Гүрнүүдийн Хөшөө цогцолбор
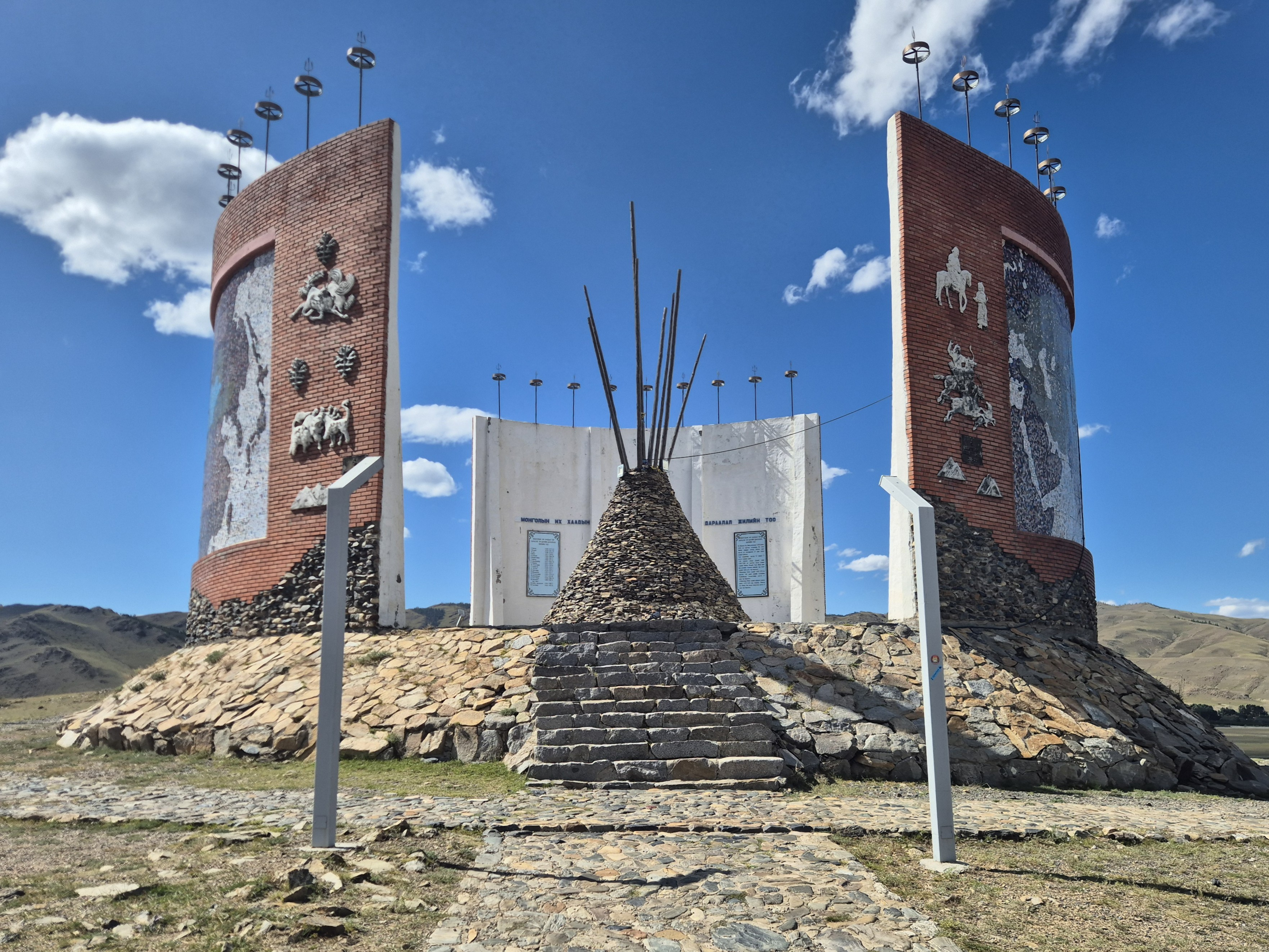
- Interactive map of Monument for Mongol States
- Location: Kharkhorin, Övörkhangai, Mongolia
- Coordinates: 47°10′50.7″N 102°48′0.0″E
- Type: monument
- Beginning date: 2003
- Completion date: 2004

The Monument for Mongol States (Mongolian: Монгол Нутаг Дахь Их Гүрнүүдийн Хөшөө цогцолбор) or Khaan's Monument is a monument in Kharkhorin, Övörkhangai Province, Mongolia.

== History ==
The construction of the monument started in 2003 and completed in 2004.

== Architecture ==
The monument was designed by sculpture and painter B. Denzen. It consists of three parts. At the center of the monuments stands a tall ovoo-shaped structure.

== See also ==
- History of Mongolia
