= Karakorum =

1235–1260 capital of the Mongol Empire

- Хархорум ᠬᠠᠷᠠᠬᠣᠷᠣᠮ; Qaraqorum (Mongolian)
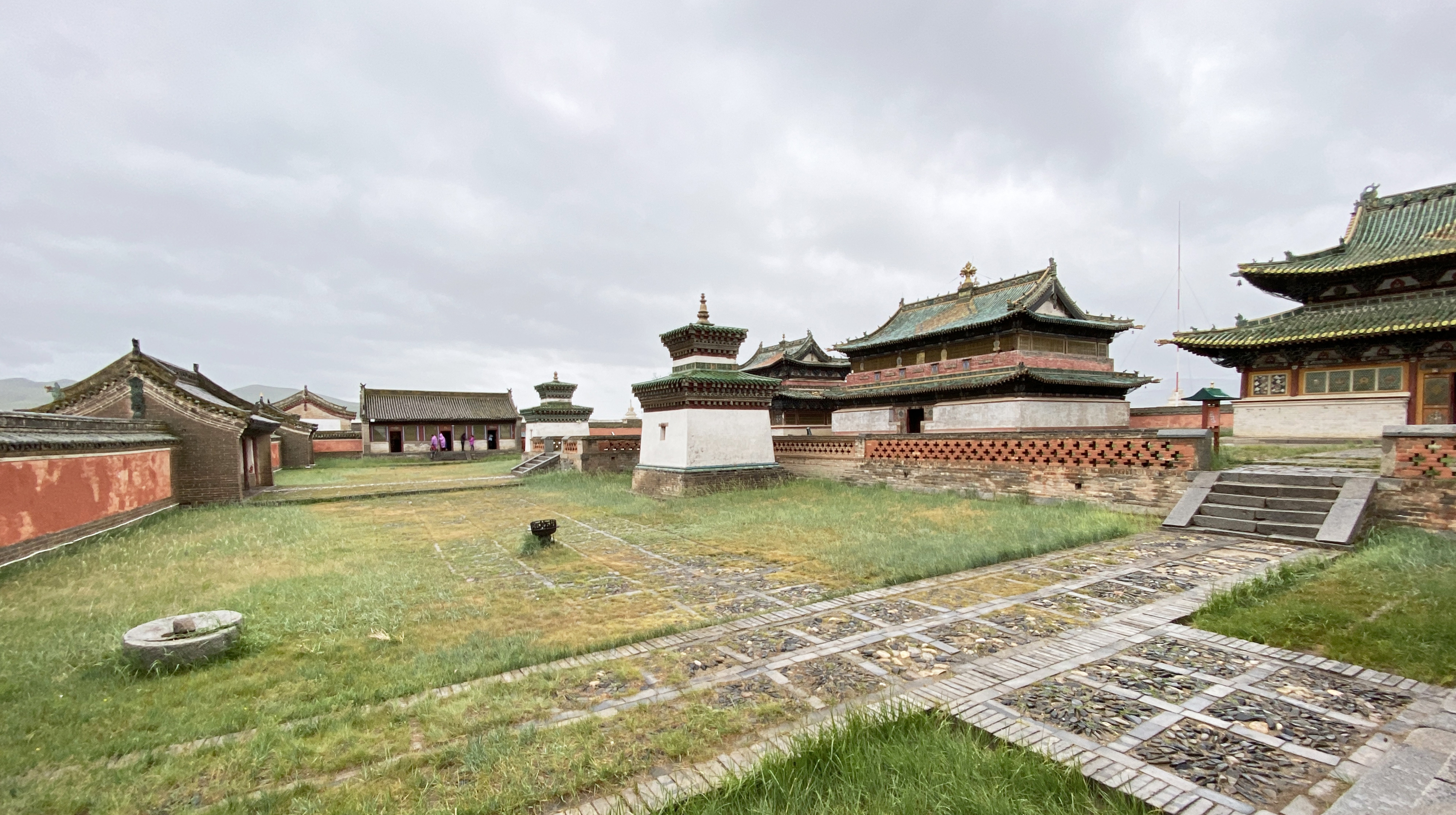
- Erdene Zuu Monastery

- Location within Mongolia
- 47°12′37″N 102°50′52″E
- Type: Ruins of a former capital
- Location: Övörkhangai Province, Mongolia
- Nearest city: Kharkhorin

History
- Founded: 1220
- Demolished: c. 16th century

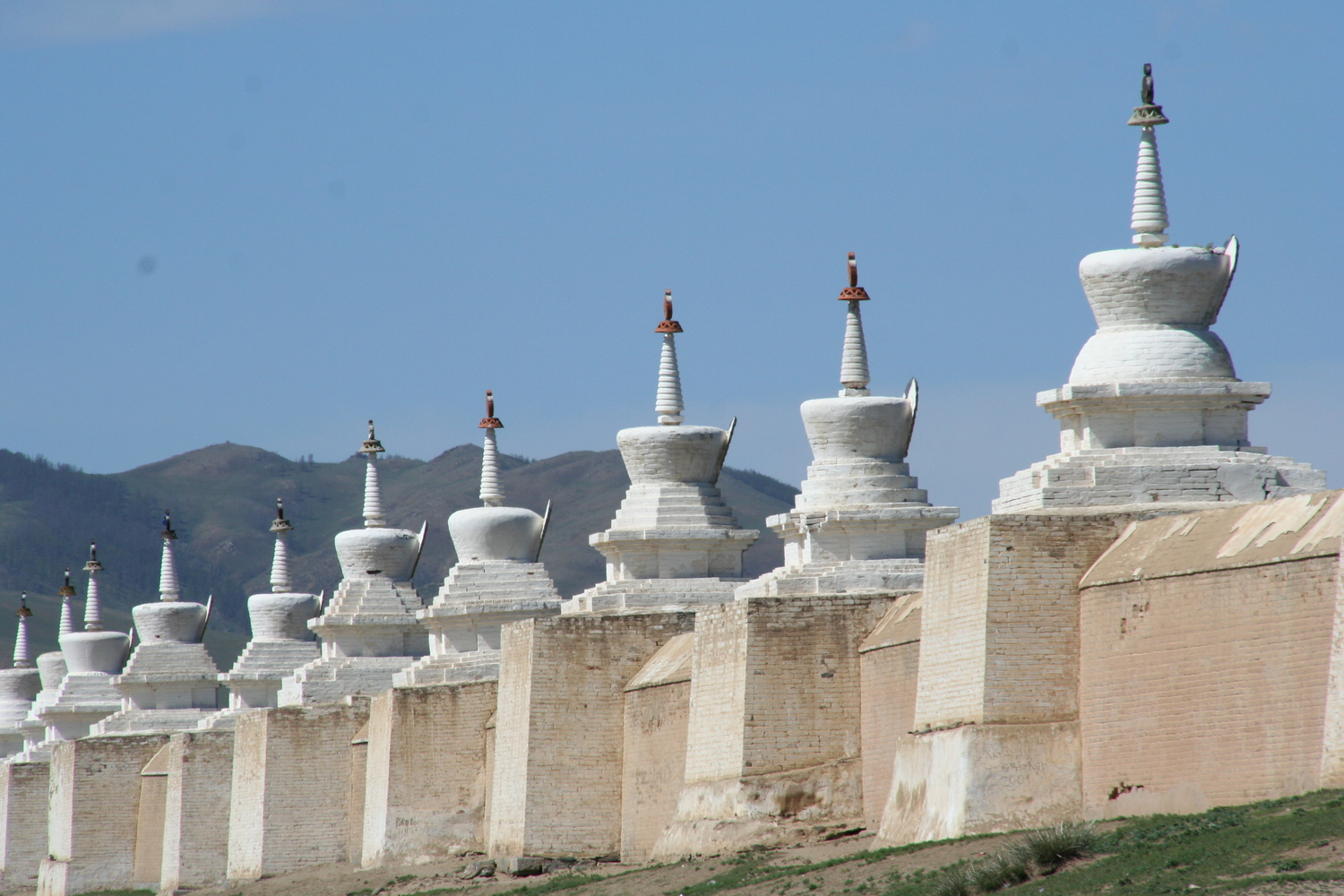
Stupas around Erdene Zuu Monastery in Karakorum

Karakorum (Note: Halh Mongolian: Хархорум, romanized: Kharkhorum, Mongolian script: ᠬᠠᠷᠠᠬᠣᠷᠣᠮ, Qaraqorum.) was the capital of the Mongol Empire between 1235 and 1260, and later served as the capital of the Northern Yuan dynasty in the late 14th and 15th centuries.

It was founded in 1220 and remained the capital until the division of the Mongol Empire, after which Dadu (present-day Beijing) became the seat of the Yuan dynasty. After the fall of the dynasty in 1368, it became the seat of fugitive Yuan princes, but probably fell into dereliction at the start of the 15th century.

Its ruins lie in the northwestern corner of the Övörkhangai Province of modern-day Mongolia, near the present town of Kharkhorin and adjacent to the Erdene Zuu Monastery, which is likely the oldest surviving Buddhist monastery in Mongolia. They are located in the upper part of the World Heritage Site Orkhon Valley.

== History ==
=== Founding ===
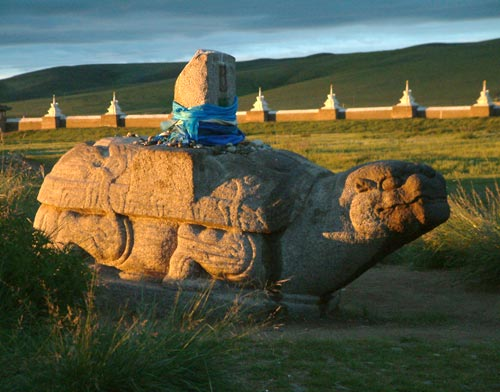
13th-century stone turtle (bixi)

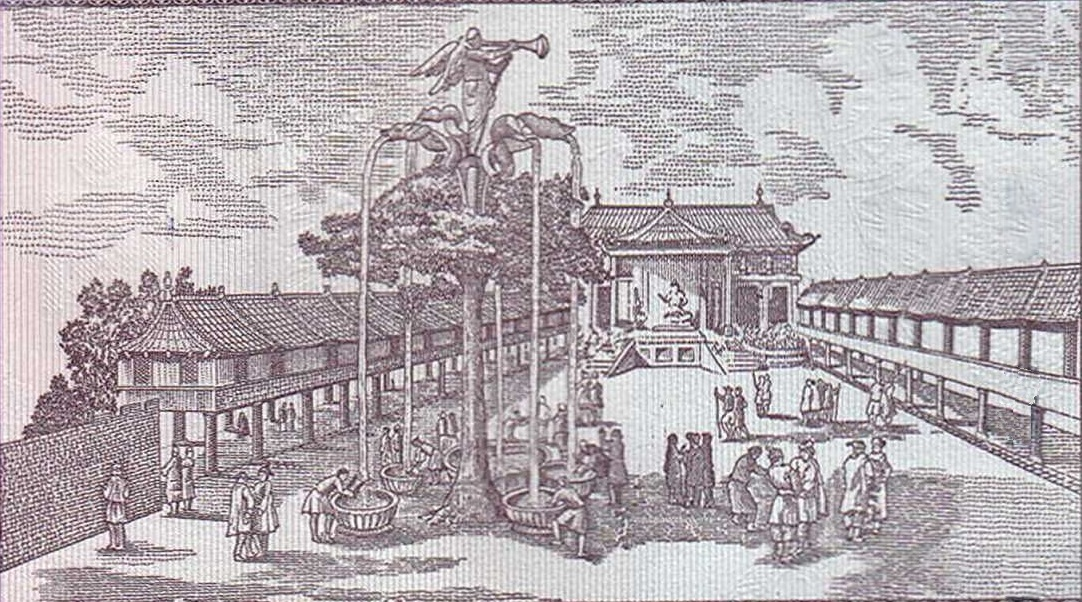
The Silver Tree of Karakorum. 18th-century Dutch imagination.

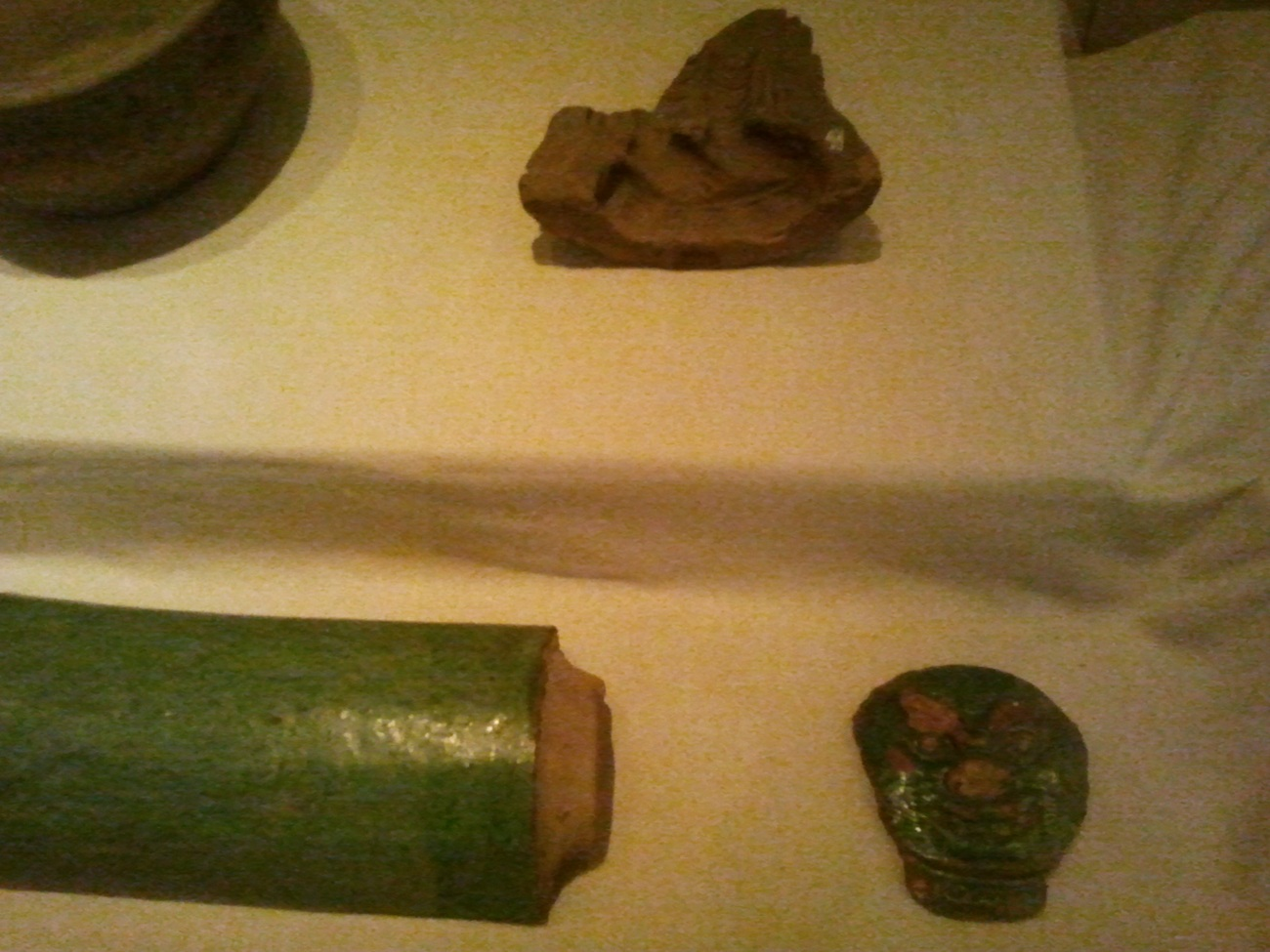
Green glazed roof tile from a 64-pillar 13th-century palace

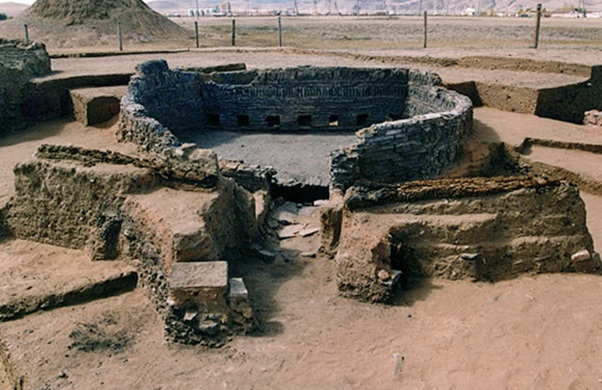
13th-century brick-producing kiln in Karakorum

The Orkhon valley was a centre of the Xiongnu, Göktürk, and Uyghur empires. To the Göktürks, the nearby Khangai Mountains had been the location of the Ötüken (the locus of power), and the Uyghur capital Karabalgasun was located close to where later Karakorum would be erected (downstream the Orkhon River 27 km north–west from Karakorum). This area is also considered to be one of the oldest farming areas in Mongolia.

In 1218–1219, Genghis Khan rallied his troops for the campaign against the Khwarazmian Empire in a place called Karakorum, but the actual foundation of a city is usually said to have occurred only in 1220. Until 1235, Karakorum seems to have been little more than a yurt town; only then, after the defeat of the Jin empire, did Genghis' successor Ögedei erect city walls and build a fixed palace. During his reign for an extended period twice a year, the khan would stay in the city, and thus Ögödei also encouraged the elite of the empire to build houses near his palace in order to centralise his power over the empire.

The advantages of choosing this site for the Mongol capital were numerous. It was more central to the growing empire. As the foundation took place late in the Medieval Warm Period, the climate was warmer and more moist than today, leading to abundant grass for grazing. The Orkhon River flowed north-south in a region where most rivers run east-west, facilitating riverine travel across, and a point of control over, the natural network. Finally, its symbolic importance as the centre of power of prior empires expressed Mongol control over the largely non-Mongol population of the region.

Ögedei Khan gave the decree to build the Tumen Amgalan Ord (Palace of Myriad Peace; Wan'angong in Chinese) in 1235, the year after he defeated the Jin dynasty. It was finished in one year. In the History of Yuan (元史), it is written in the section for Taizong (太宗) Ögedei Khan: "In the seventh year (1236), in the year of the blue sheep the Wan'angong (萬安宮) was established in Helin (和林, Karakorum)." One of Genghis Khan's nine ministers, Yelü Chucai (1190–1244), said the following poem during the ridge raising ceremony of the Tumen Amgalan Ord: "Installed ridge well fit and stone foundation, The parallel placed majestic palace has been raised, When the bells and drums of the Lord and officials sound pleasantly, The setting sun calls the horses of war to itself from the mountain peaks." The Mongolian version of the poem is as follows: "Tsogtslon tavih nuruu chuluun tulguur, Zeregtsen zogsoh surleg asriig bosgovoi, Ezen tushmediin honh hengereg ayataihan hanginan duursahad, Echih naran uuliin tolgoigoos dainii agtadiig ugtnam.

=== Prosperity ===
Under Ögedei and his successors, Karakorum became a major site for world politics. Möngke Khan had the palace enlarged, and the great stupa temple completed. They had Guillaume Bouchier, an enslaved Parisian goldsmith, design the Silver Tree of Karakorum for the city centre.

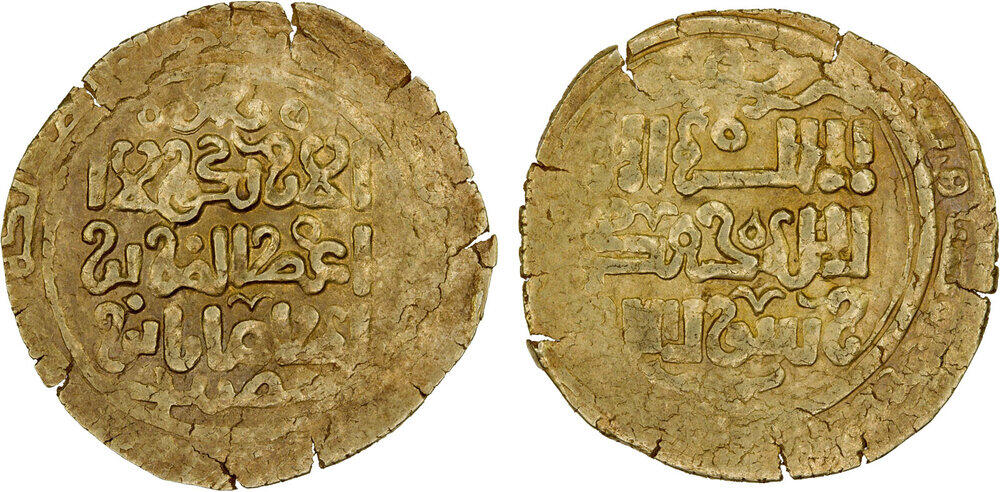
Islamic-style gold dinar minted in Karakorum during the reign of Ögedei Khan.

A large tree sculpted of silver and other precious metals rose up from the middle of the courtyard and loomed over the palace, with the branches of the tree extending into the building. Silver fruit hung from the limbs and it had four golden serpents braided around the trunk, while within the top of the tree was placed a trumpet angel, all as automata performing for the emperor's pleasure. When the Khan wanted to summon the drinks for his guests, the mechanical angel raised the trumpet to his lips and sounded the horn, whereupon the mouths of the serpents began to gush out a fountain of alcoholic beverages into the large silver basin arranged at the base of the tree.

Russian princes typically visited Sarai, the seat of the Golden Horde, to receive confirmation of their right to the throne; however, there were occasions when they had to make the journey to Karakorum. The death of a great khan sometimes necessitated a visit by the grand prince of Vladimir to Mongolia, although many, if not all, local princes, were confirmed in Sarai. Although the Russians typically chose the grand prince themselves, based on traditional succession practices, there were exceptional circumstances. Following the death of Yaroslav Vsevolodovich in 1246, Batu Khan granted the yarlyk (patent) for the throne to his brother Sviatoslav. However, the conflict between Batu Khan and Güyük Khan led to competing appointments. Yaroslav's two eldest sons, Alexander and Andrey, were summoned to Karakorum, where the grand princely throne was given to the latter.

==== William of Rubruck's account ====
William of Rubruck, a Flemish Franciscan missionary and papal envoy to the Mongol Empire, reached Karakorum in 1254. He left one of the most detailed, though not always flattering, accounts of the city. He compared it rather unfavorably to the village of Saint-Denis near Paris, and was of the opinion that the royal abbey there was ten times as magnificent as the Khan's palace. On the other hand, he also described the town as a very cosmopolitan and religiously tolerant place, and the silver tree he described as part of Möngke Khan's palace as having become the symbol of Karakorum. He described the walled city as having four gates facing the four directions, two quarters of fixed houses, one for the "Saracenes" and one for the "Cathai", twelve pagan temples, two mosques, as well as a Nestorian church.

=== Later history ===
After the dissolution of the empire in 1260 (Yeke Mongol Ulus) into the separate entities of the Yuan Empire, Ilkhanate, Chaghatayid Khanate and Golden Horde, Khubilai Khan (r. 1260–1294) developed Dadu—present-day Beijing—as the capital of the Yuan Empire.

Karakorum was thence reduced to a mere administrative centre of a provincial backwater of the Yuan dynasty of China in 1271. Furthermore, the ensuing Toluid Civil War with Ariq Böke and a later war with Kaidu deeply affected the town. In 1260, Kublai disrupted the town's grain supply, while in 1277 Kaidu took Karakorum, only to be ousted by Yuan troops and Bayan of the Baarin in the following year.

As one of the camps of the Chinggisids, Karakorum retained a high ideological status and, after the foundation of Lingbei Province in 1307, which roughly encompassed the territory of present-day Mongolia, the city remained the administrative centre of the region north of the Gobi Desert. In the first half of the fourteenth century, a series of public buildings were erected in the city, to which inscription stones bear witness. As the result the first half of the 14th century became a new era of prosperity for the city: in 1299, the town had been expanded eastwards, then in 1311, and again from 1342 to 1346, the stupa temples were renewed.

=== Decline ===
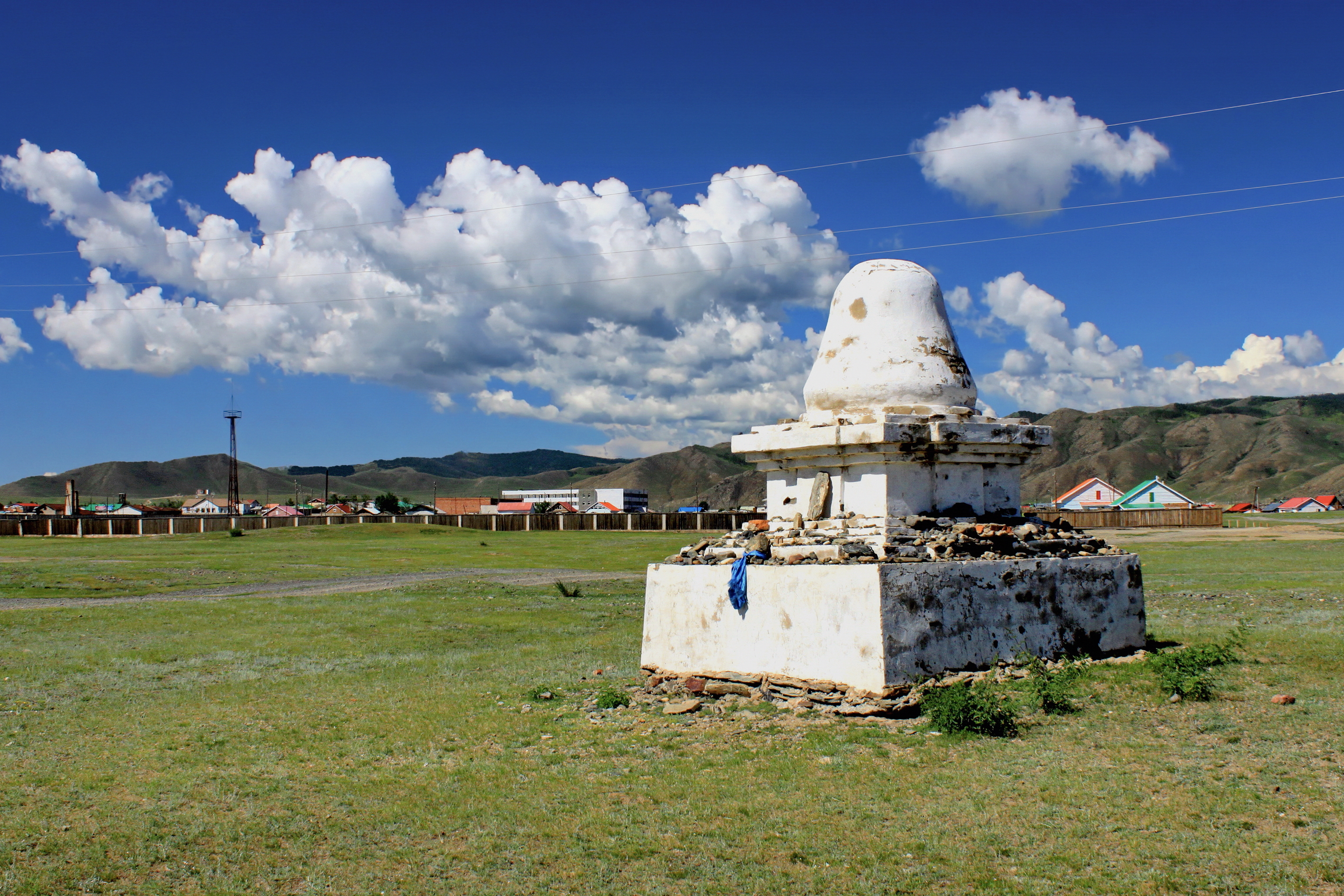
Old, damaged stupa of Nirvana

After the collapse of the Yuan dynasty in 1368, Karakorum became the residence of Biligtü Khan in 1370. In 1372, the Ming army under General Li Wenzhong occupied Karakorum, causing severe damage to the city. In 1380, Ming troops occupied and later razed Karakorum again. According to Saghang Sechen's Erdeni-yin Tobči, in 1415 a kurultai decided to rebuild it, but no archaeological evidence for such a venture has been found yet. However, Karakorum was inhabited at the beginning of the 16th century, when Batu-Möngke Dayan Khan made it a capital once again. In the following years, the town changed hands between Oirads and Chinggisids several times, and was consequently given up permanently.

== Excavations ==
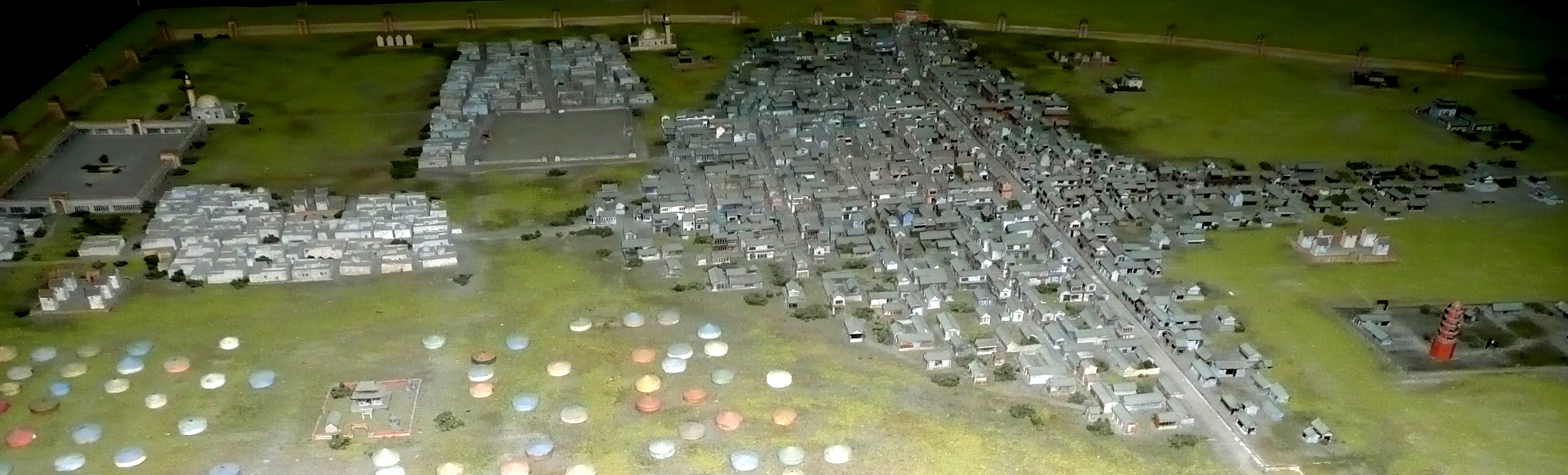
The model of the city Karakorum in the National Museum of Mongolian History in Ulaan-Baatar

The Erdene Zuu Monastery stands near Karakorum. Various construction materials were taken from the ruin to build this monastery. The actual location of Karakorum was long unclear, despite frequent mentions in historical sources. First hints that Karakorum was located at Erdene Zuu were already known in the 18th century, but until the 20th century, there was a dispute whether or not the ruins of Karabalgasun, or Ordu-Baliq, were in fact those of Karakorum. In 1889, the site was conclusively identified as the former Mongol capital by Nikolai Yadrintsev, who discovered examples of the Orkhon script during the same expedition. Yadrintsev's conclusions were confirmed by Wilhelm Radloff.

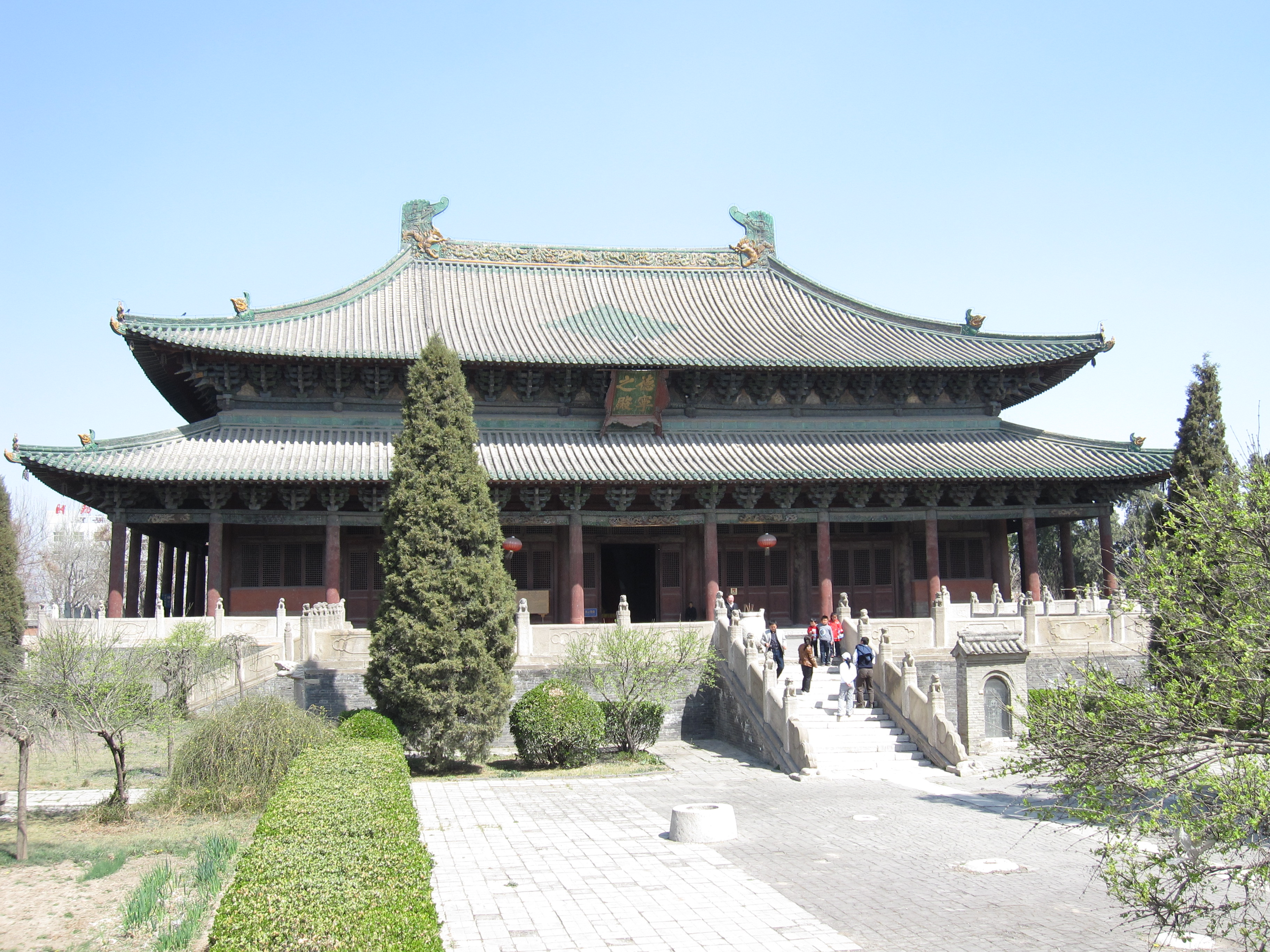
Dening Hall of the Beiyue Temple built in 1270 during the Yuan dynasty closely resembles the lost palace architecture of Dadu (Beijing) and Karakorum.

The first excavations took place in 1933–34 under D. Bukinich. After his Soviet-Mongolian excavations of 1948–49, Sergei Kiselyov concluded that he had found the remains of Ögödei's palace. However, this conclusion has been put into doubt by the findings of the 2000–2004 German-Mongolian excavations, which seem to identify them as belonging to the great stupa temple rather than to Ögödei's palace.

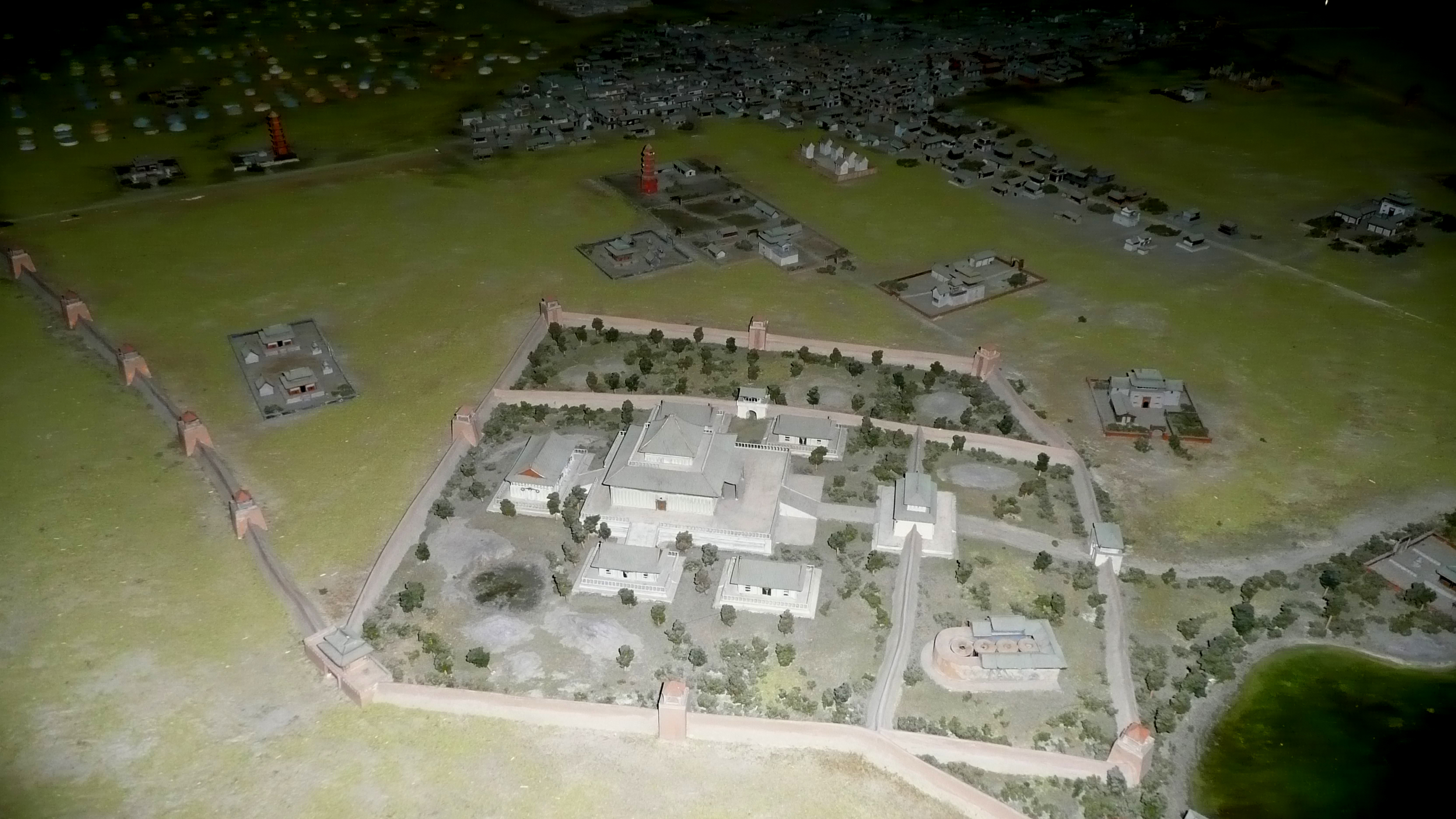
Model of the Khan Palace called Tumen Amgalan Ord, Wanangong (萬安宫) in Chinese

Excavation findings include paved roads, some brick and many adobe buildings, floor heating systems, bed-stoves, evidence for the processing of copper, gold, silver, iron (including iron wheel naves), glass, jewels, bones, and birch bark, as well as ceramics and coins from China and Central Asia. Four kilns have also been unearthed.

== Buildings ==
The Virtual Kharakhorum project of 2020 reconstructed the city in an explorable 360 degree format based on the latest archeological studies. The following are some of the notable buildings of the city.

=== Khan's Palace ===
The Tumen Amgalan Ord (Palace of Myriad Peace), built in 1236, was located at the southern end of the city enclosed by a wall of its own. Previously the large building outside the Erdene Zuu Monastery on its north-west side was thought to be the Khan's Palace. Later research revealed that the large building was actually the 300 feet (90m) tall Pavilion of the Rising Yuan. The Khan's Palace is now understood to have been located on the exact site of the Erdene Zuu Monastery. The northern wall of the Palace separated it from the city the outline of which can be clearly seen on satellite images. 13th century walls have been excavated under the current walls of the monastery.

William of Rubruck wrote that "Mangu had at Caracarum a great palace, situated next to the city walls, enclosed within a high wall like those which enclose monks' priories among us." An even older layer dating back to the 8th century has also been discovered under the 13th century walls. This has been theorized to be the Takhai Balgas (Takhai City) mentioned in Mongolian chronicles relating to the foundation of the Erdene Zuu Monastery. The Yuanshi and the Karakorum Sino-Mongolian Inscription of 1342 both state that Genghis Khan established his capital in Karakorum in 1220 and that Ogedei Khan later built a wall around the entire city in 1236. Some remnants of the smaller old wall may have already existed during Genghis Khan's time and his palace would have been stationed on the spot of the Palace of Myriad Peace. In a traditional Khuree (circular, mobile camp) arrangement the mobile palace of the Khan is usually located in the centre with an open square or unhindered space to the south which was well-guarded. In the case of Karakorum the non-palatial part of the settlement grew only to the northern side of the palace with no settlement to the south of the palace. This not only followed the general principle of the Khuree but also provided the Khan unhindered access to the nearby river and forested mountains to the south and south-west which were his hunting grounds. This also ensured that there was no settlement upstream the Orkhon River which flowed north-westwards along the western side of the city from the southern mountains. A similar arrangement existed in Urga (present-day Ulaanbaatar) where the southern part of the city close to the river and mountain was reserved for the Khan whereas the ger districts expanded to the north.

William of Rubruck states that the Khan's Palace in Karakorum was "like a church, with a middle nave, and two sides beyond two rows of pillars, and with three doors to the south, and beyond the middle door on the inside stands the tree, and the Khan sits in a high place to the north, so that he can be seen by all; and two rows of steps go up to him: by one he who carries his cup goes up, and by the other he comes down. The space which is in the middle between the tree and these steps by which they go up to him is empty; for here stands his cup-bearer, and also envoys bearing presents; and he himself sits up there like a divinity. On (his) right side, that is to the west, are the men, to the left the women." This was in line with the internal arrangement of a Mongolian ger, as William of Rubruck states separately in his account: "When they have fixed their dwelling, the door turned to the south, they set up the couch of the master on the north side. The side for the women is always the east side, that is to say, on the left of the house of the master, he sitting on his couch his face turned to the south. The side for the men is the west side, that is, on the right." This arrangement, as well as the avoidance of touching the entrance threshold (mentioned by Rubruck), has continued down to the present-day among Mongols.

Apart from the permanent palace of Karakorum there was the moving palace of the Khan which regularly moved around the city and settled in a ring shape (Huriye or circular enclosure) on its stops. William of Rubruck served as a priest of the Khan (along with a healer monk from Jerusalem) for four months in this moving palace before entering Karakorum in April 1254 with the Khan and his moving palace. Despite the destruction of the permanent palace by the Ming in 1388 there was still a moving palace in the region until 1585 when the senior Genghisid of the central Mongolian region Abtai Sain Khan decided to restore the permanent palace area in the form of a monastery (Erdene Zuu) using the stones and bricks of Karakorum. Erdene Zuu also became the mother monastery of Urga (Ulaanbaatar). Urga was founded in 1639 by Tusheet Khan Gombodorj the grandson of Abtai Sain Khan (both of whose mausoleums are within Erdene Zuu) as a residence for his 5 year old son Zanabazar. Urga (Palace) was also called the Huriye (circular enclosure) and was initially staffed by monks from nearby Erdene Zuu. Gers from Gombodorj's own Huriye as well as the ger-temple of Abtai Sain Khan were given to Urga (Abtai Sain Khan's ger was dismantled in Ulaanbaatar in 1937). The circular ger-district surrounding Gandantegchenlin Monastery in Ulaanbaatar (itself an extension of the Zuun Khuree/Huriye) is the only remaining Huriye organically descended from Gombodorj's Huriye and arguably the only remaining Huriye in the world. A Huriye called the Ring of the Avars (written Hring), a circular fortress of the Avar khagan containing three centuries worth of gold and treasures, was taken by Pepin of Italy in 792.

William of Rubruck said that within the palace of Karakorum "there are many buildings as long as barns, in which are stored his provisions and his treasures." Ata-Malik Juvayni, a one time resident of Karakorum, says in his History of the World Conqueror that Ogedei Khan frequently invited people into the open yard of these treasure buildings where they were free to carry away all they could in a set time. The Khan also gave frequent donations from this treasure to the city's poor. The palace was built in Chinese architectural style as was common in the region since Xiongnu times. There were three main palace buildings standing side by side in a parallel form as mentioned in Yelu Chucai's poem. The three main buildings of Erdene Zuu Monastery are also parallel and sit on an elevated platform like the earlier palace. Fragments of the Sino-Mongolian inscription of 1342 were found embedded in different places in the walls of Erdene Zuu Monastery, thereby giving further proof that the monastery was largely built using stones and bricks of Karakorum. A chief feature inside the main palace was the Silver Tree made by Guillaume Boucher.

=== Rebuilding Karakorum ===
President of Mongolia Ukhnaagiin Khurelsukh announced in 2023 a plan to rebuild the historical capital city.

== See also ==
- Architecture of Mongolia
- Khara-Khoto
- Ordu-Baliq
- Ötüken
- Shangdu

== Sources ==
- Rockhill, William Woodville, ed. (1900). The Journey of William of Rubruck to the Eastern Parts of the World, 1253–55. Translated by Rockhill, William Woodville. London: Hayklut Society.
