= Erdenesiin Khuree =

Art gallery in Kharkhorin, Övörkhangai, Mongolia

- Эрднэсийн Хүрээ Урлаг, уран бичлэгийн Төв
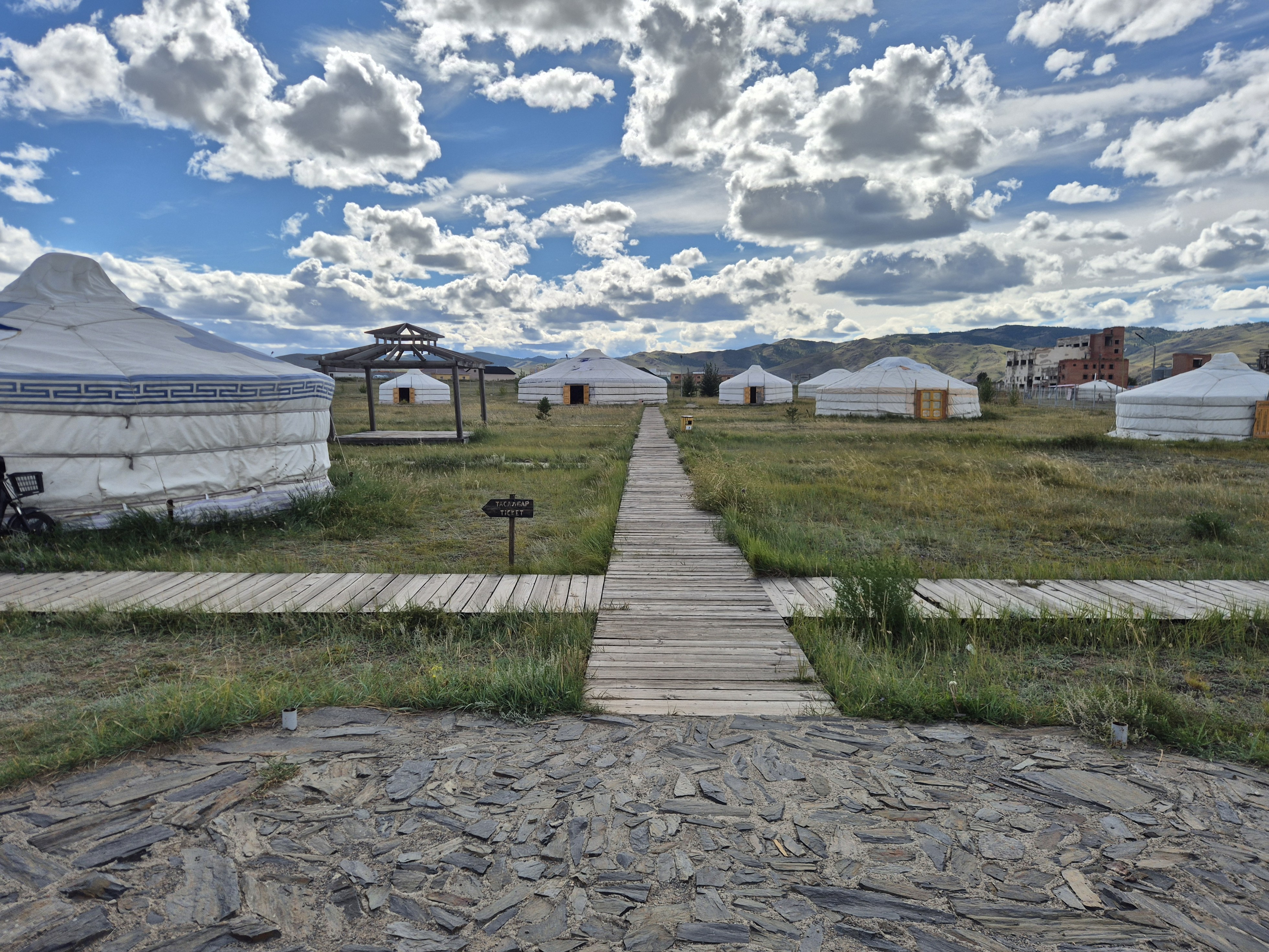
- Established: July 2021
- Location: Kharkhorin, Övörkhangai, Mongolia
- Coordinates: 47°11′49″N 102°50′9″E
- Type: art gallery
- Founder: Tamir Samandbadraa Purev
- Website: Official website

Erdenesiin Khuree, or the Erdenesiin Khuree Mongolian Calligraphy and Art Center (Mongolian: Эрднэсийн Хүрээ Урлаг, уран бичлэгийн Төв), is a Mongolian calligraphy art gallery in Kharkhorin, Övörkhangai Province, Mongolia.

== History ==
The preparation work to establish the gallery started in 2018 by artist Tamir Samandbadraa Purev. The gallery was opened in July 2021, and has hosted a variety of exhibitions since. Over the years, the gallery has hosted a series of exhibitions featuring both Mongolian and international artists. Resident artists have helped broaden its reach by leading collaborative workshops that connect their own disciplines with Mongolian calligraphy. In September 2023 for example, the gallery organised a ceramics workshop.

== Architecture ==
The gallery consists of nice exhibition halls. Each exhibition hall is housed in a ger.

== Activities ==
The gallery hosts exhibitions from different artists related to Mongolian calligraphy. It also regularly offers calligraphy practice or workshops for visitors.

== See also ==
- Culture of Mongolia
