= Erdene Zuu Monastery =

Buddhist monastery in Kharkhorin, Övörkhangai, Mongolia

Erdene Zuu Monastery Эрдэнэ Зуу хийд ལྷུན་གྲུབ་བདེ་ཆེན་གླིང་། ᠡᠷᠳᠡᠨᠢ ᠵᠤᠤ ᠬᠡᠢᠳ
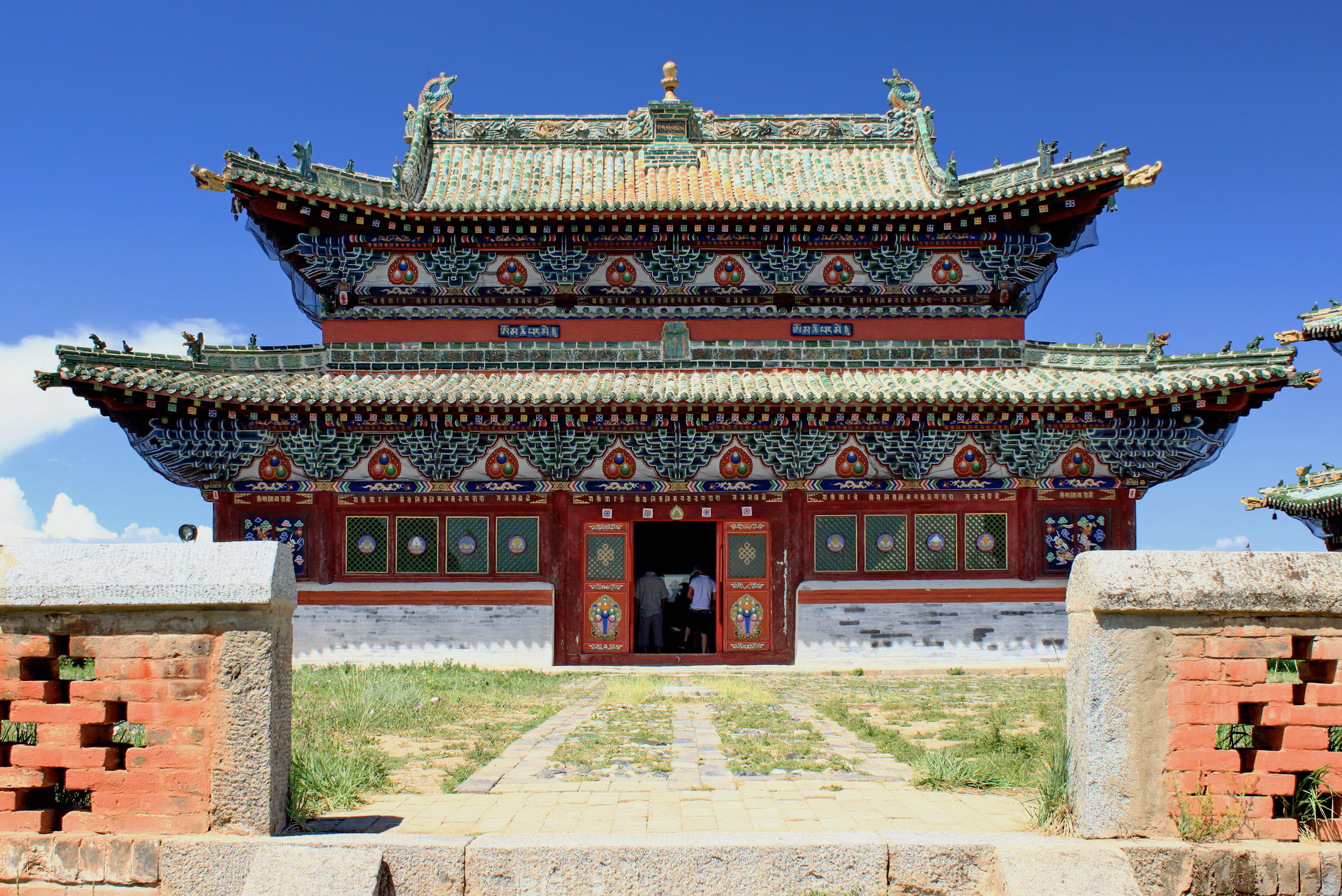

- Location within Mongolia

Religion
- Affiliation: Tibetan Buddhism
- Sect: Gelug

Location
- Location: Near Kharkhorin, Övörkhangai Province, Mongolia
- Country: Mongolia
- Coordinates: 47°12′06″N 102°50′36″E

Architecture
- Founder: Abtai Sain Khan
- Established: 1585

The Erdene Zuu Monastery (Mongolian: Эрдэнэ Зуу хийд, romanized: Erdene Zuu khiid) (Note: Mongolian script: ᠡᠷᠳᠡᠨᠢ ᠵᠤᠤ ᠬᠡᠶᠢᠳ, erdeni juu keyid; Tibetan: ལྷུན་གྲུབ་བདེ་ཆེན་གླིང་།, lhun grub bde chen gling / Lhündrup Dechenling; Chinese: 光顯寺; pinyin: Guāngxiǎn sì) is probably the earliest surviving Buddhist monastery in Mongolia. Built in 1585, it is located in Kharkhorin, Övörkhangai Province and is now included within the Orkhon Valley Cultural Landscape World Heritage Site. The monastery is affiliated with the Gelug sect of Tibetan Buddhism.

== History ==
Abtai Sain Khan, ruler of the Khalkha Mongols and grandfather of Zanabazar, the first Jebtsundamba Khutuktu, ordered construction of the Erdene Zuu monastery in 1585 after his meeting with the 3rd Dalai Lama and the declaration of Tibetan Buddhism as the state religion of Mongolia. Stones from the nearby ruins of the thirteenth century Mongol capital of Karakorum were used in its construction. Planners attempted to create a surrounding wall that resembled a Tibetan Buddhist rosary featuring 108 stupas (108 being a sacred number in Buddhism), but this objective was probably never achieved. The monastery's temple walls were painted, and the Chinese-style roof covered with green tiles.

The monastery was damaged in 1688 during one of the many wars between Dzungars and Khalkha Mongols. Locals dismantled the wooden fortifications of the abandoned monastery. According to tradition, in 1745, a local Buddhist disciple named Bunia made several unsuccessful attempts to fly with a device he invented which was similar to a parachute.

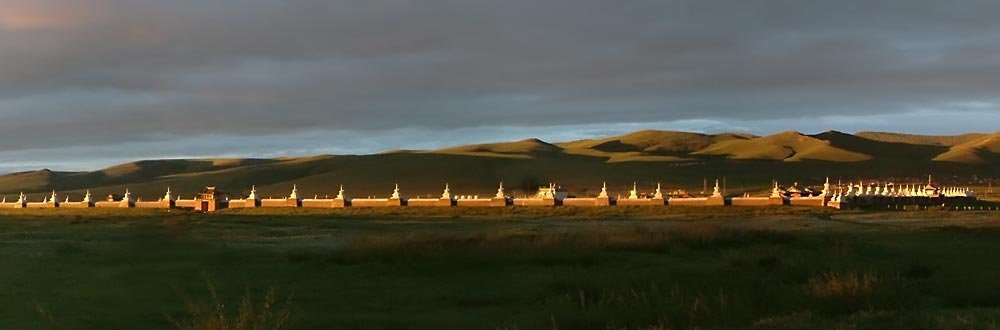
Erdene Zuu Monastery

In 1939, the communist leader Khorloogiin Choibalsan ordered the monastery destroyed, as part of a political purge that destroyed hundreds of monasteries in Mongolia and killed more than ten thousand monks. Three small temples and the external wall with the stupas survived the initial onslaught. By 1944, Joseph Stalin pressured Choibalsan to maintain the monastery (along with Gandantegchinlen Monastery in Ulaanbaatar) as a showpiece for international visitors, such as U.S. Vice President Henry Wallace, to prove that the communist regime allowed freedom of religion. In 1947, the temples were converted into museums. For the next four decades, Gandantegchinlen Khiid Monastery became Mongolia's only functioning monastery.

After the fall of communism in Mongolia in 1990, the monastery was turned over to the lamas. They restored Erdene Zuu as a place of worship. Today, it is an active Buddhist monastery as well as a museum that is open to tourists.

On a hill outside the monastery sits a stone phallus called Kharkhorin Rock. The phallus is said to restrain the sexual impulses of the monks and ensure their good behavior.

== Gallery ==
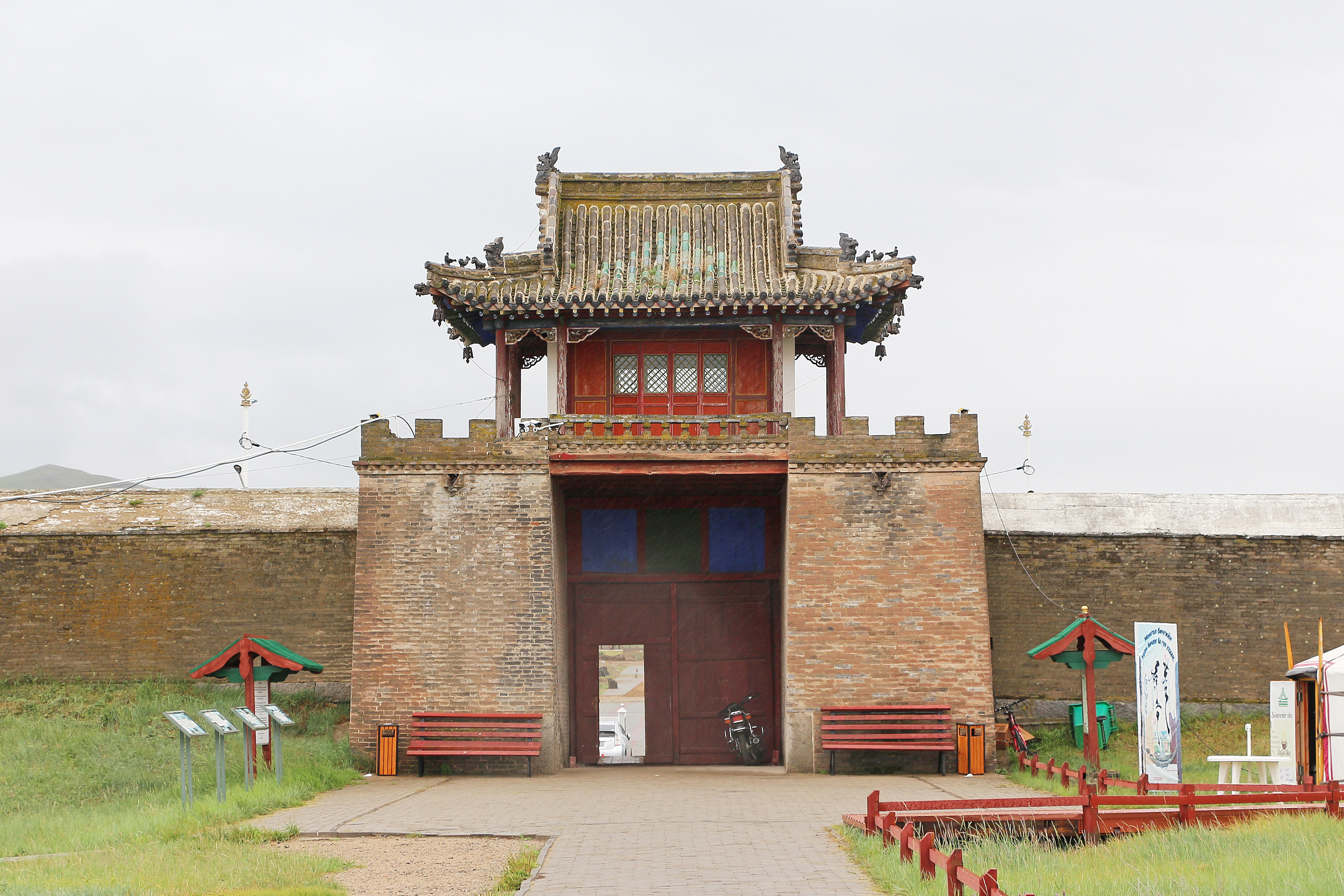
Main gate

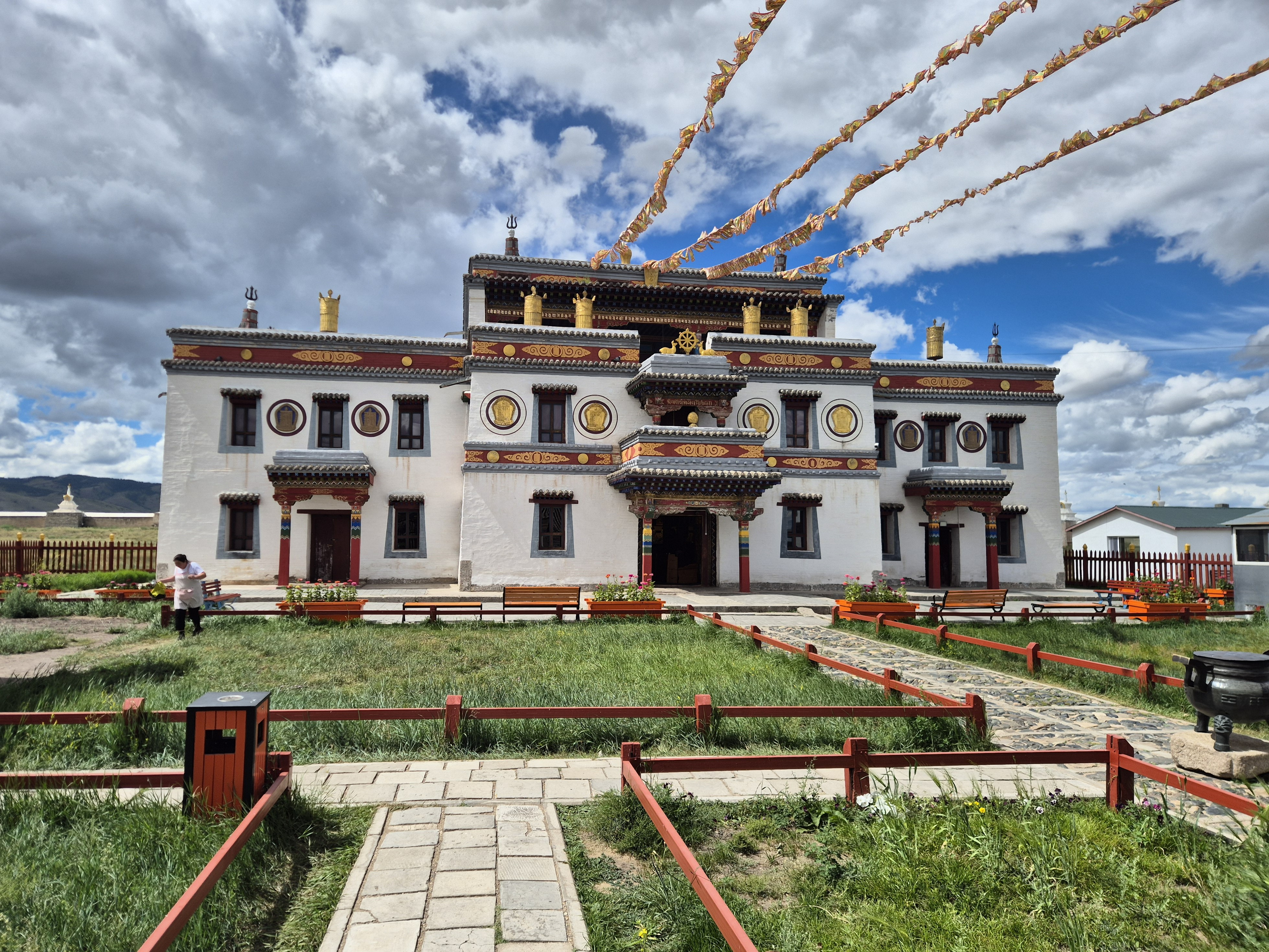
Lavrin Temple

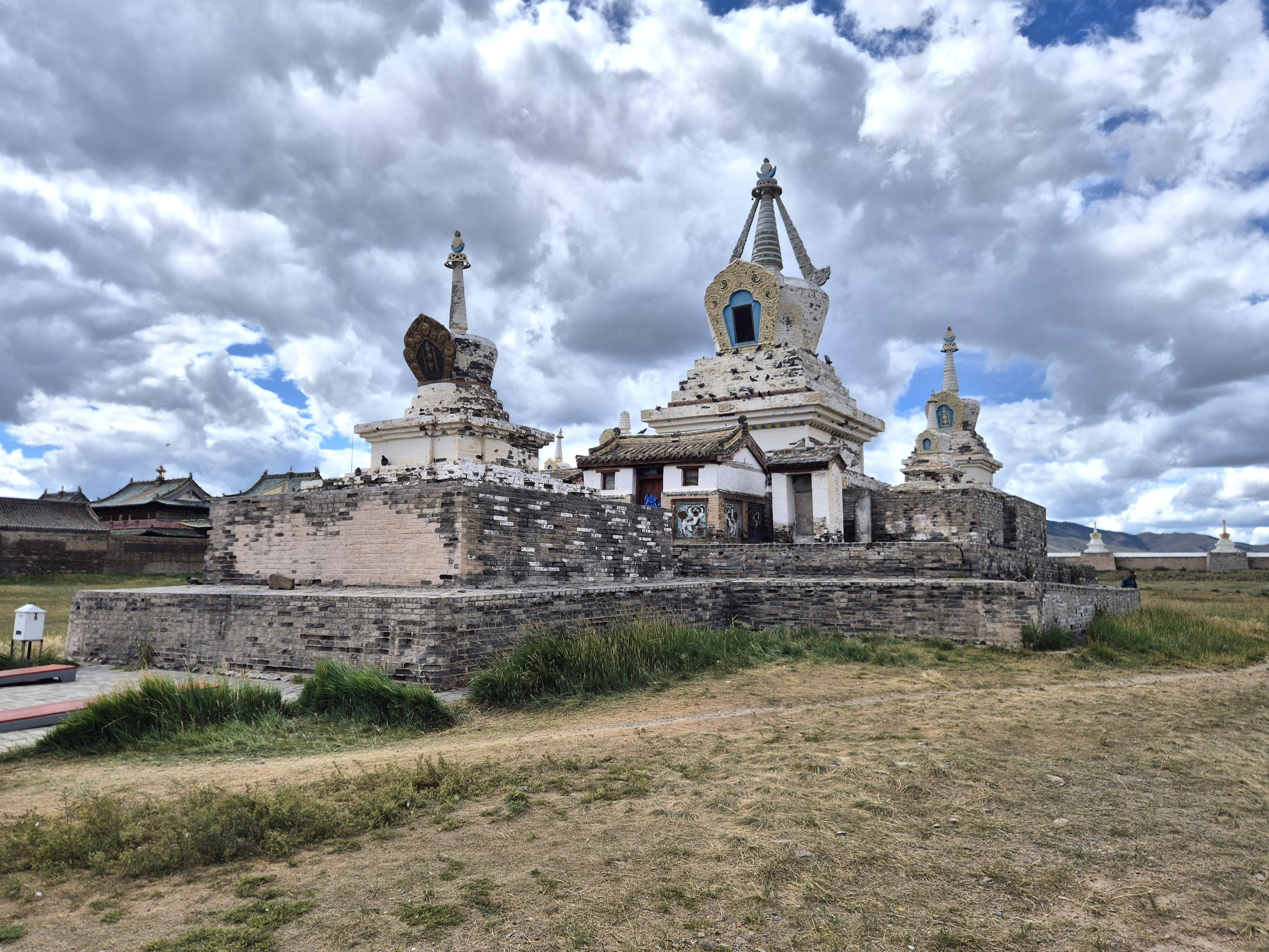
Erdene Zuu Monastery Stupa

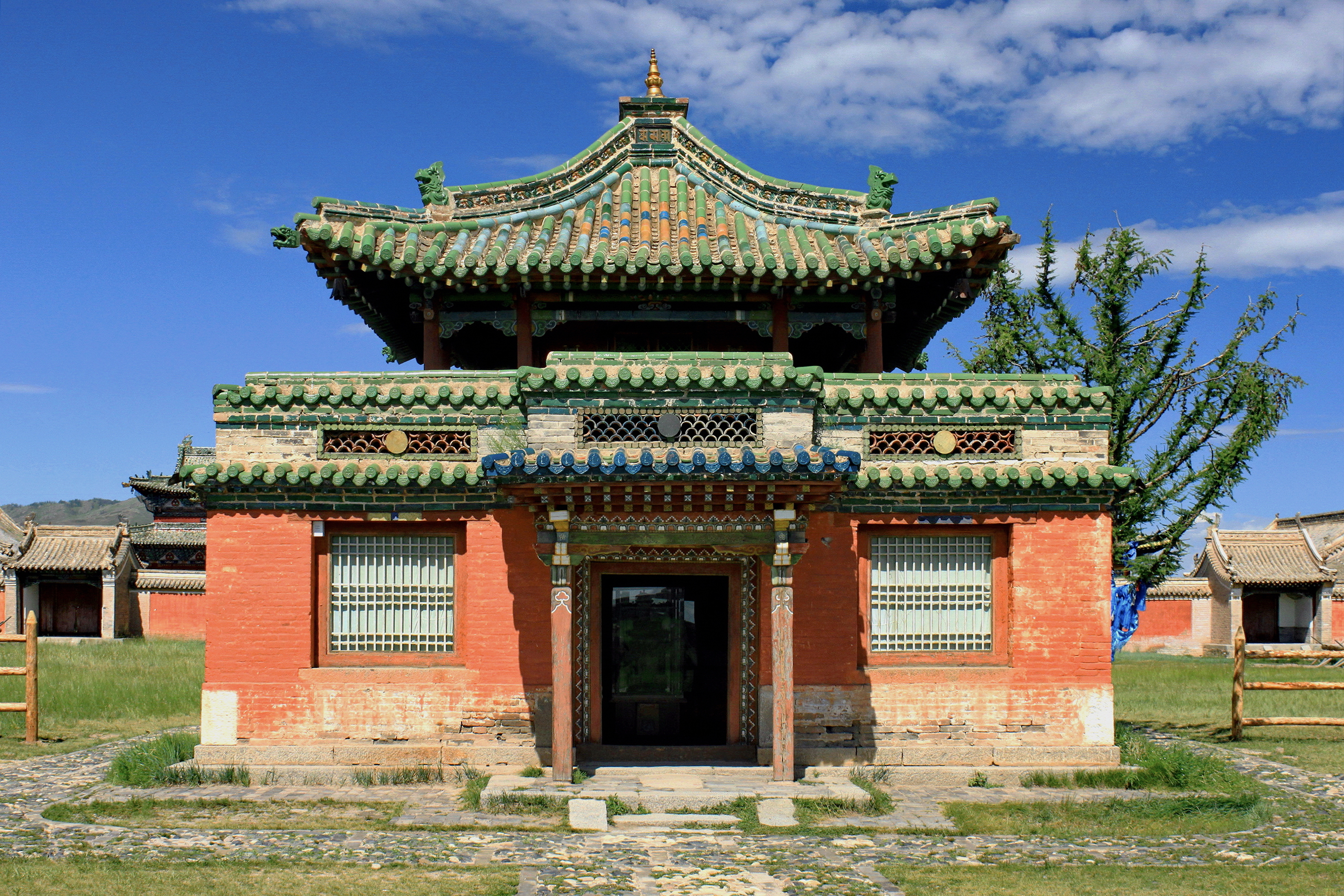
The Temple of Dalai Lama

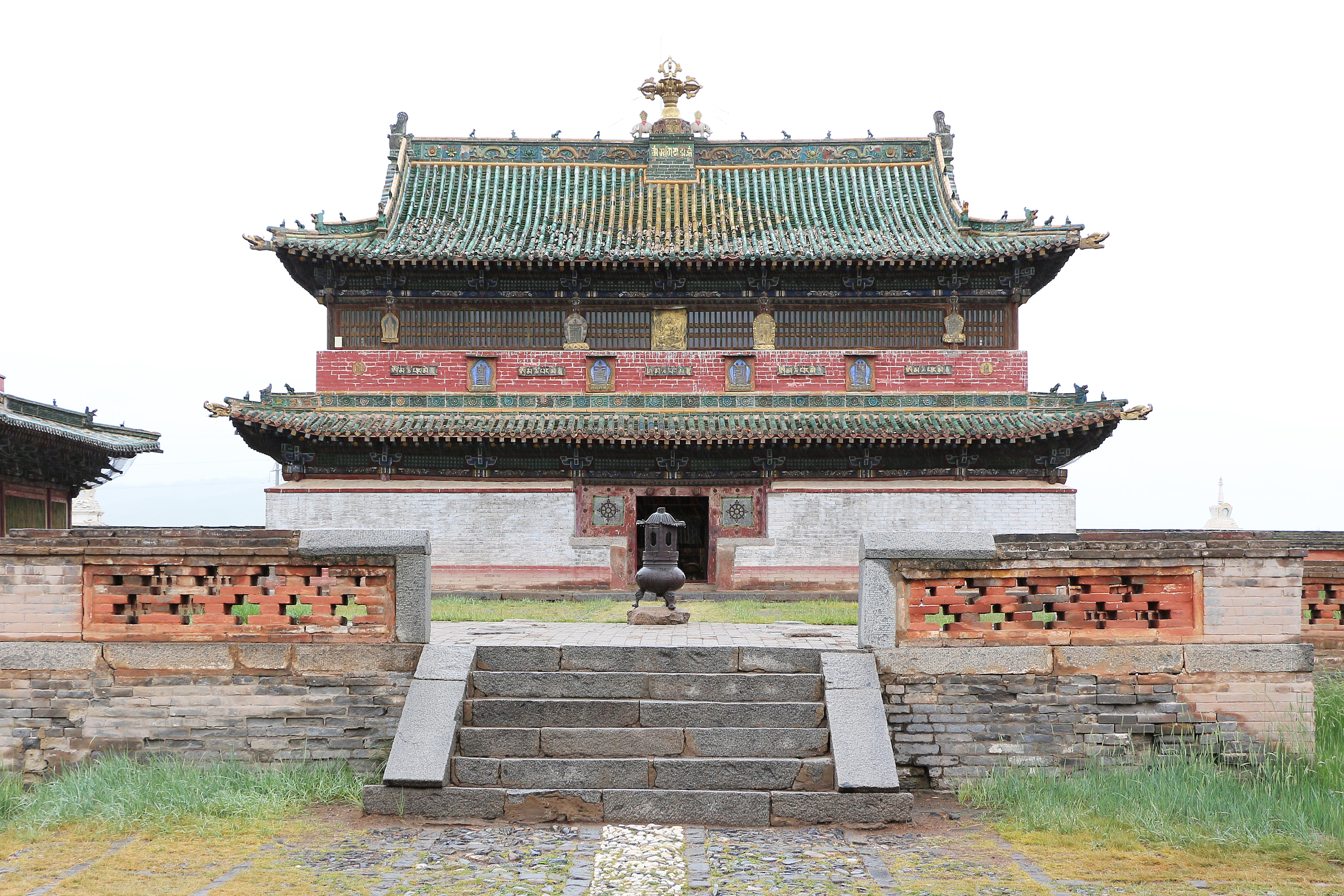
Gol Zuu Temple

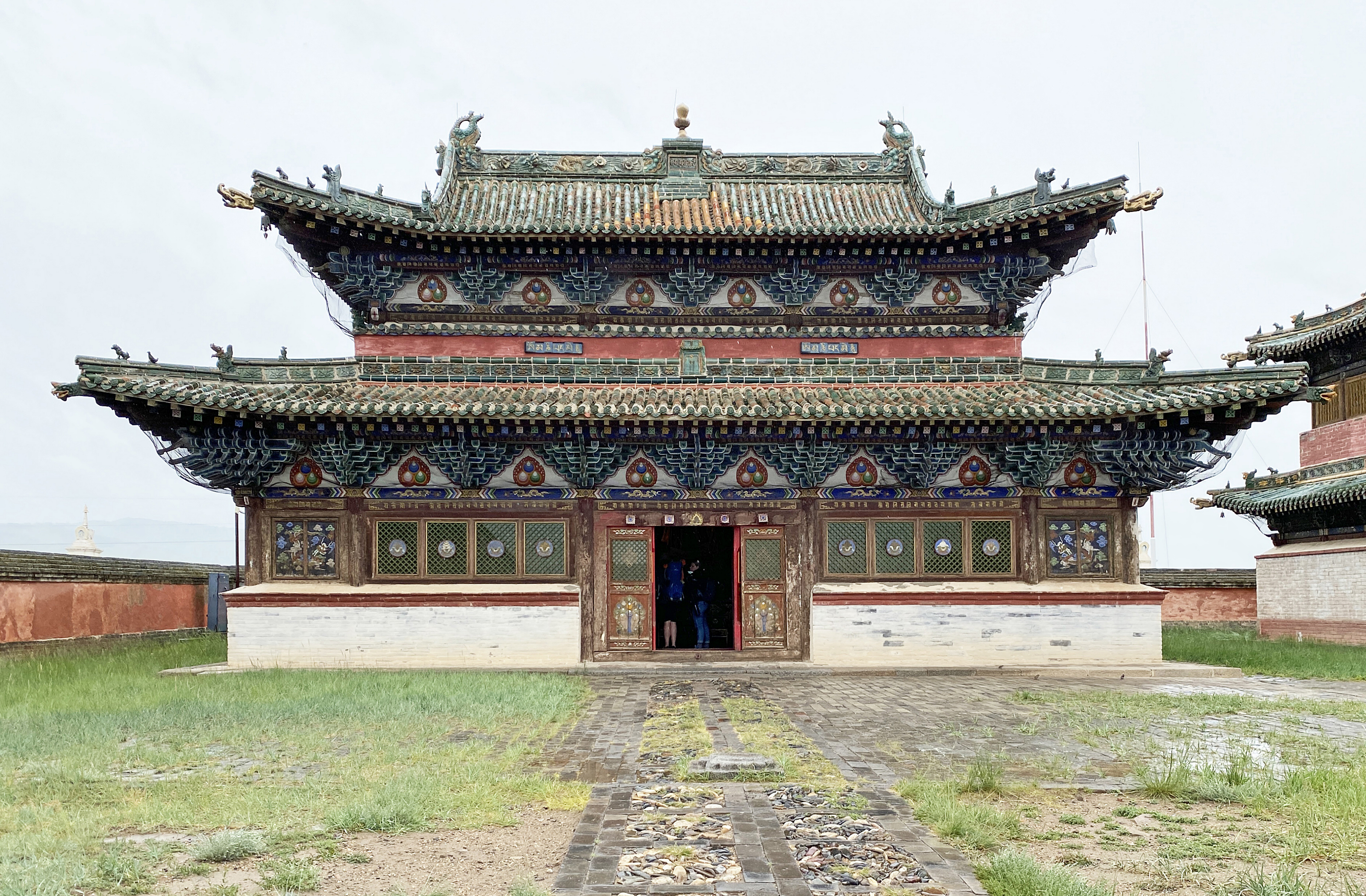
Eastern Zuu Temple

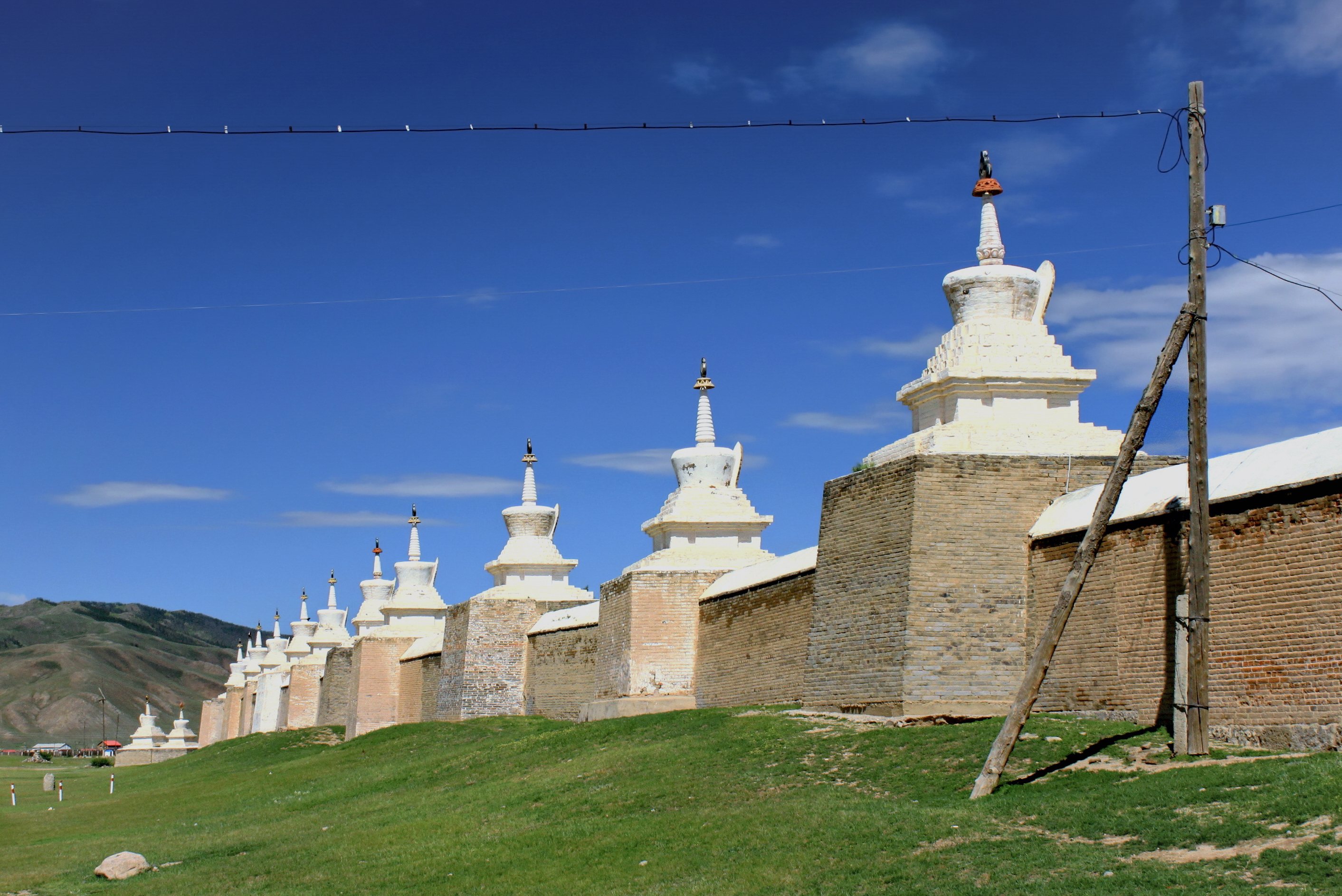
Stupas

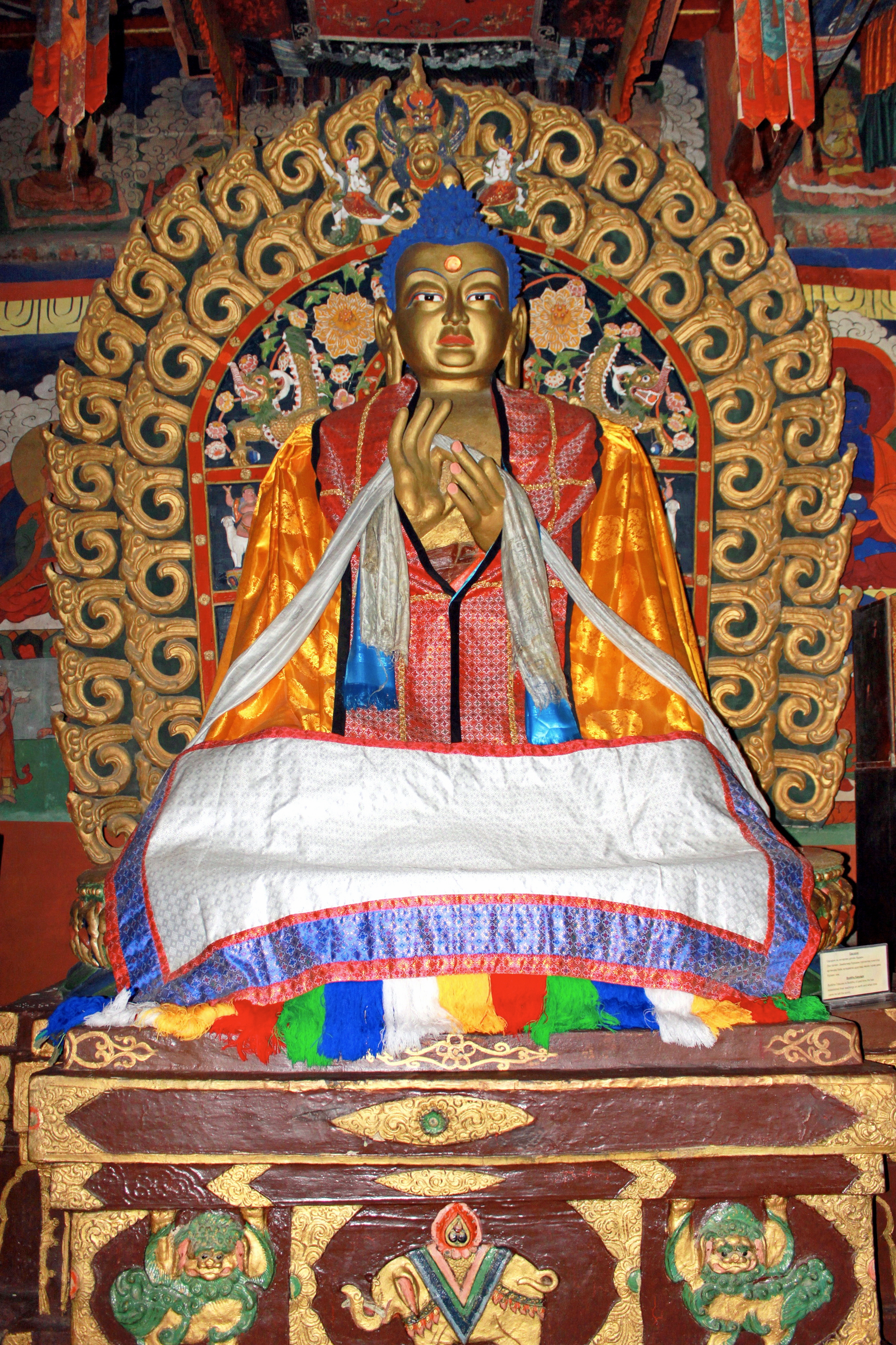
Sanjaa (Buddha Dīpankara) inside Western Temple

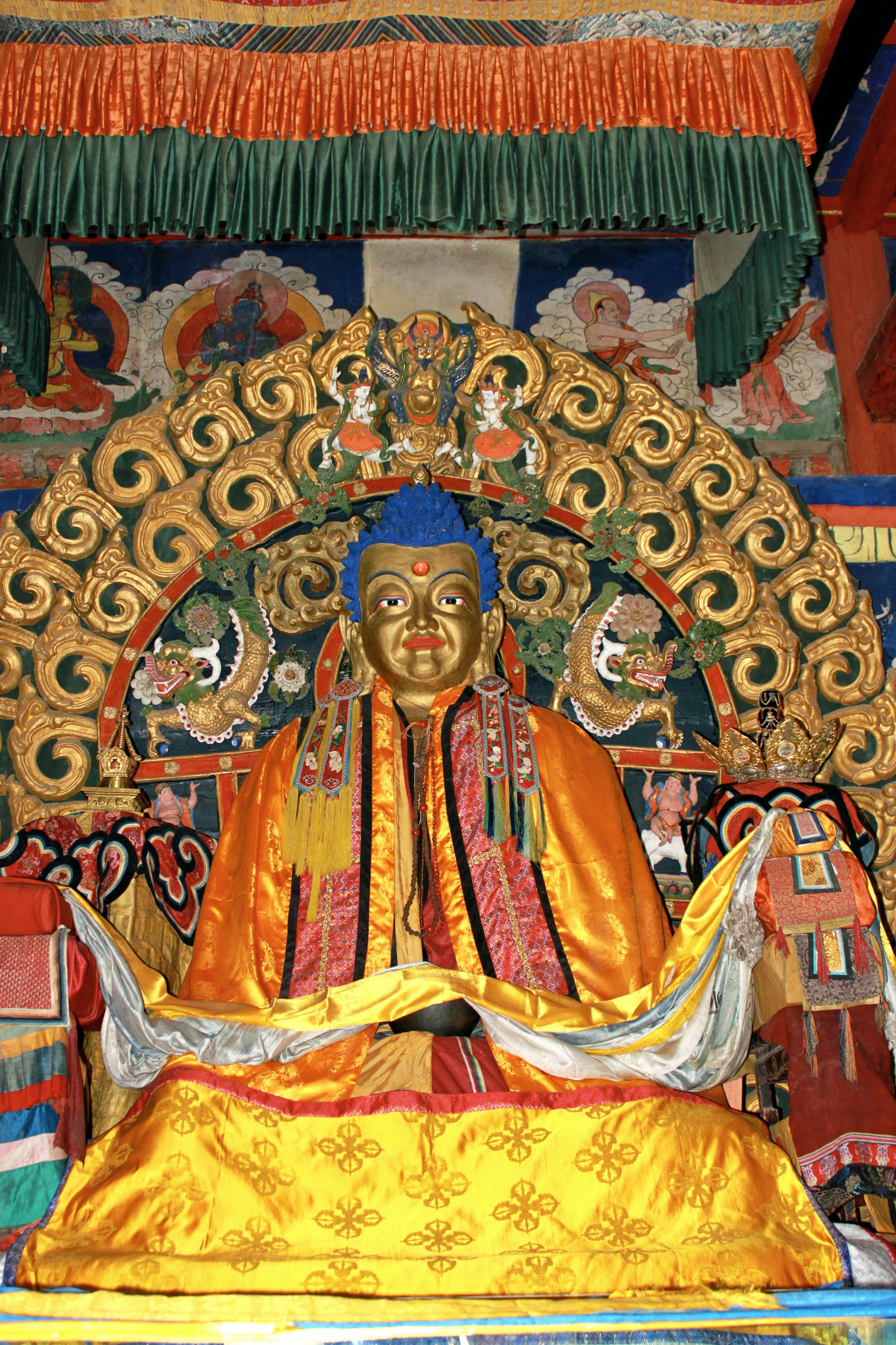
Buddha Sakyamuni inside Western Temple

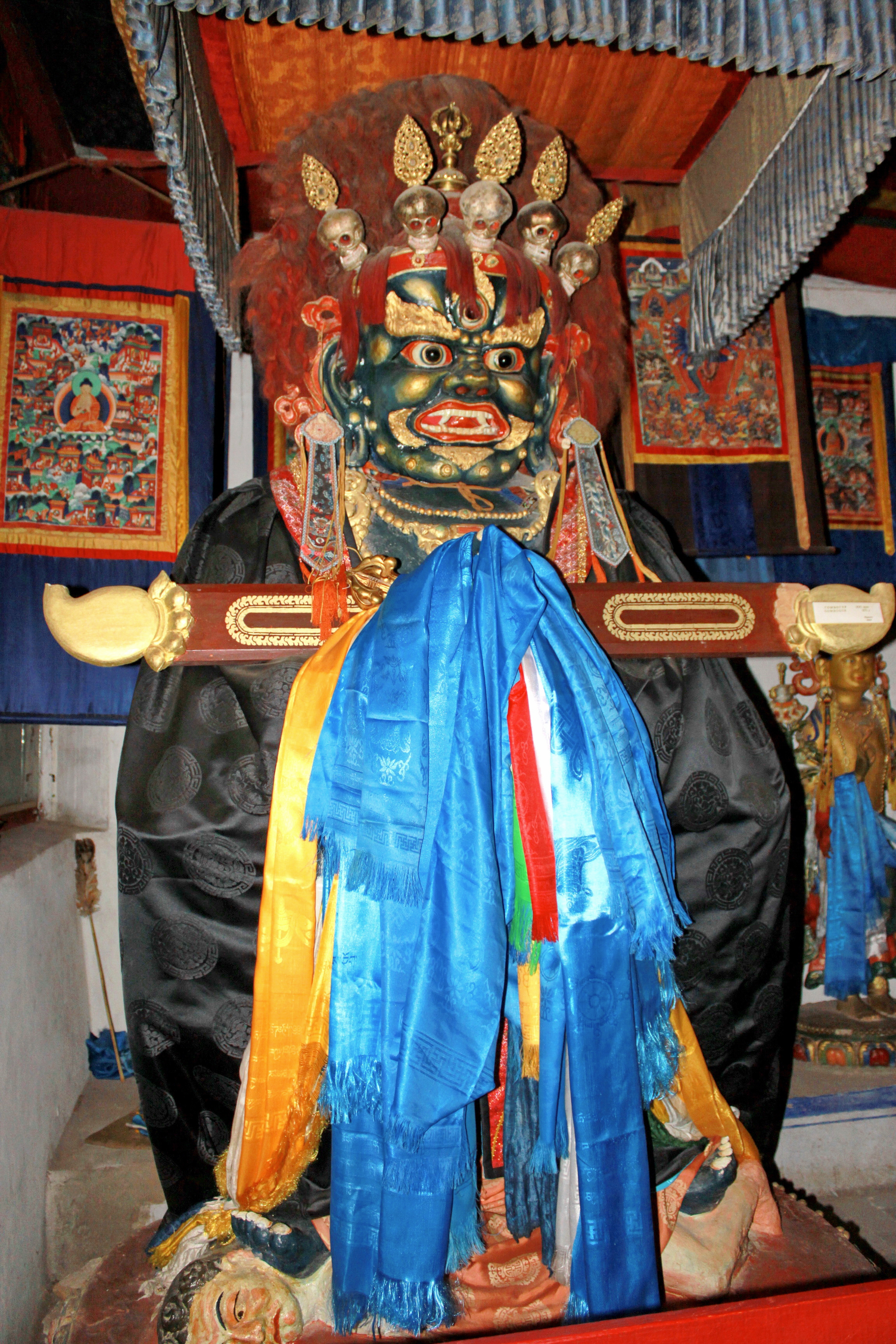
Sita Mahakala (Gonggor) inside Main Temple

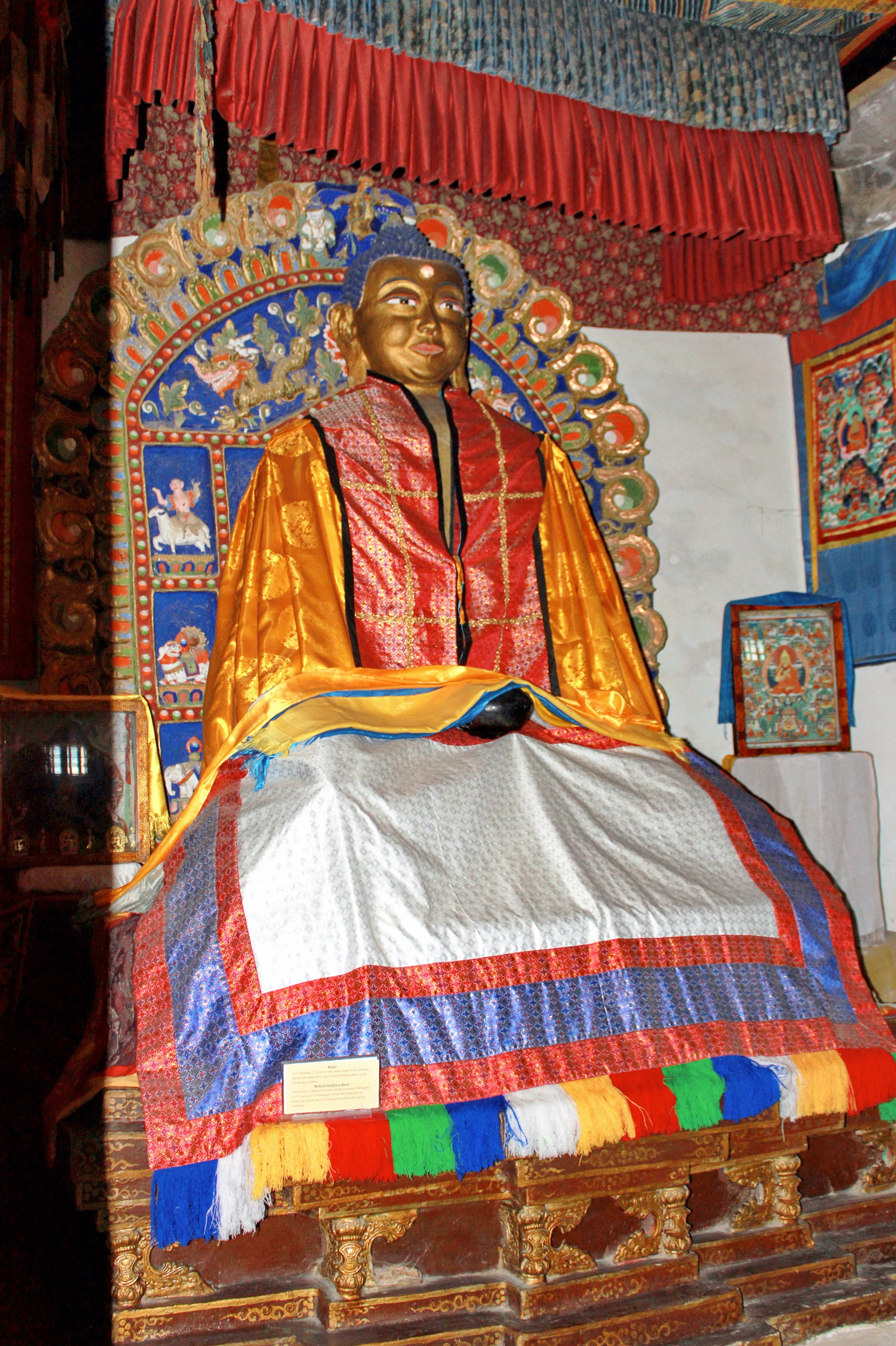
Buddha Amitābha (The Buddha of Immeasurable Life and Light) inside Main Temple

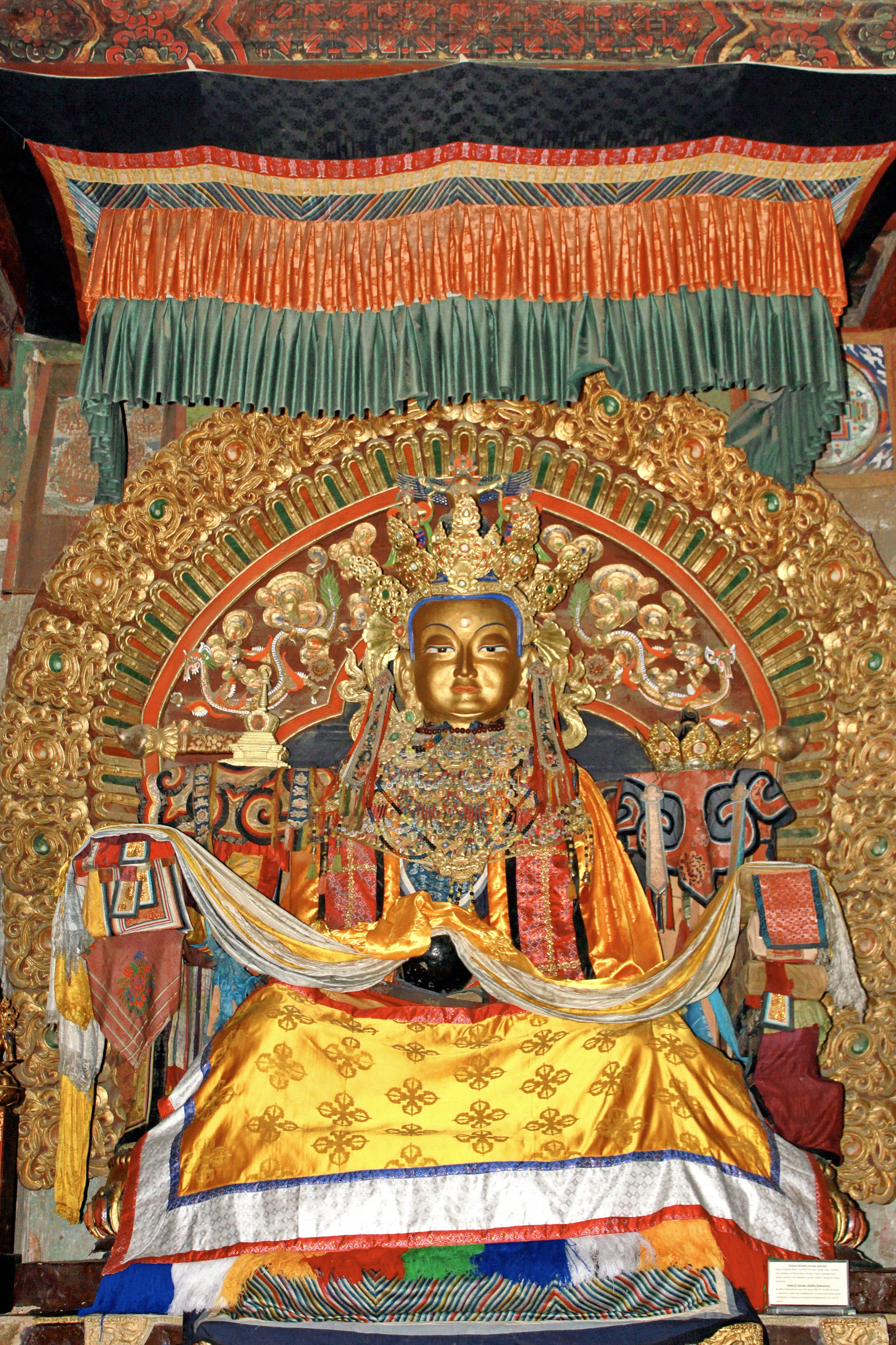
Buddha in his teenage years inside Eastern Temple

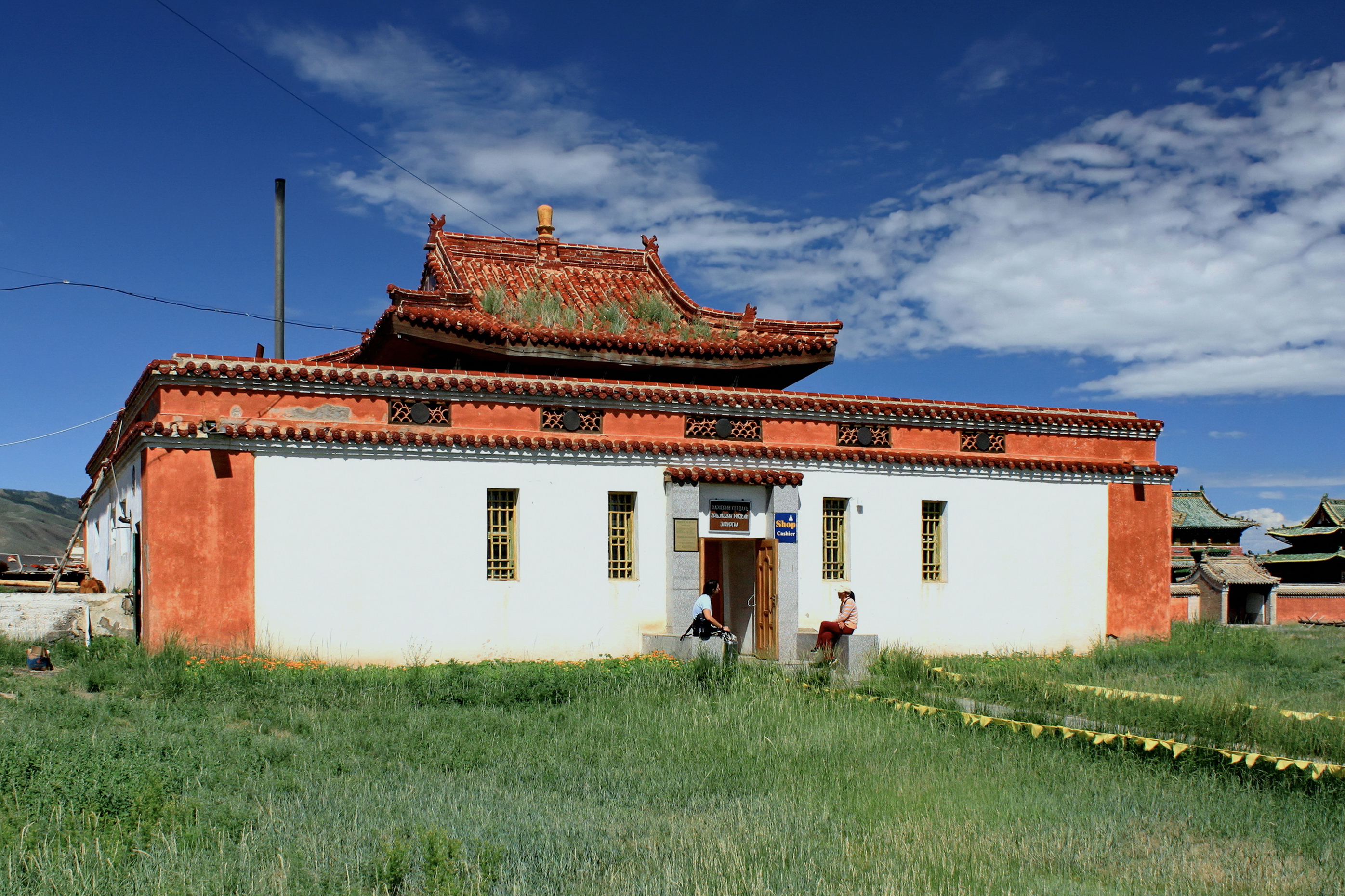
Museum office
