= Jargalant, Bayankhongor =

District in Bayankhongor Province, Mongolia

Coordinates: 47°01′19″N 99°28′49″E

Jargalant Sum Жаргалант сум ᠵᠢᠷᠭᠠᠯᠠᠩᠲᠤᠰᠤᠮᠤ
- Sum
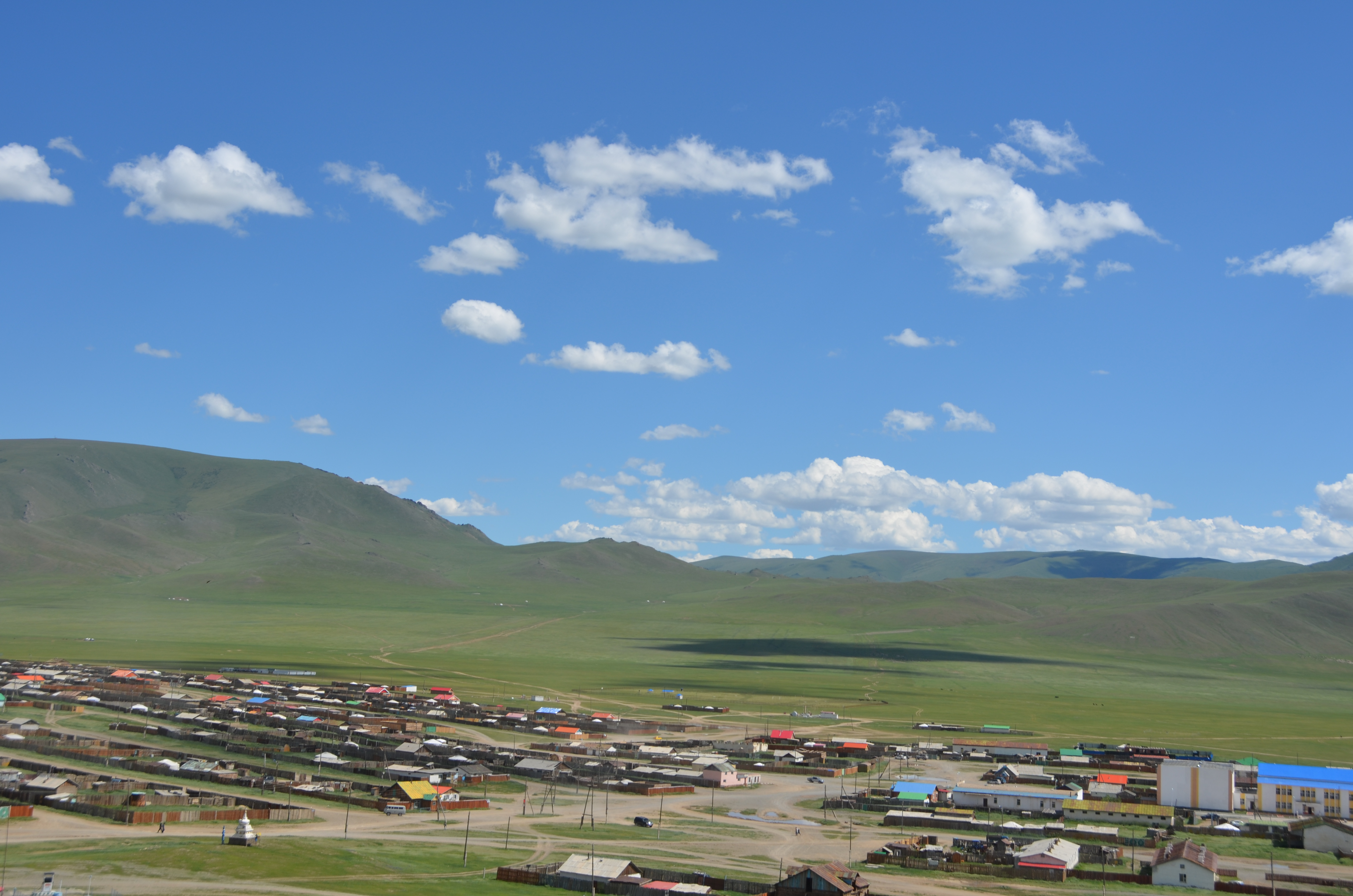

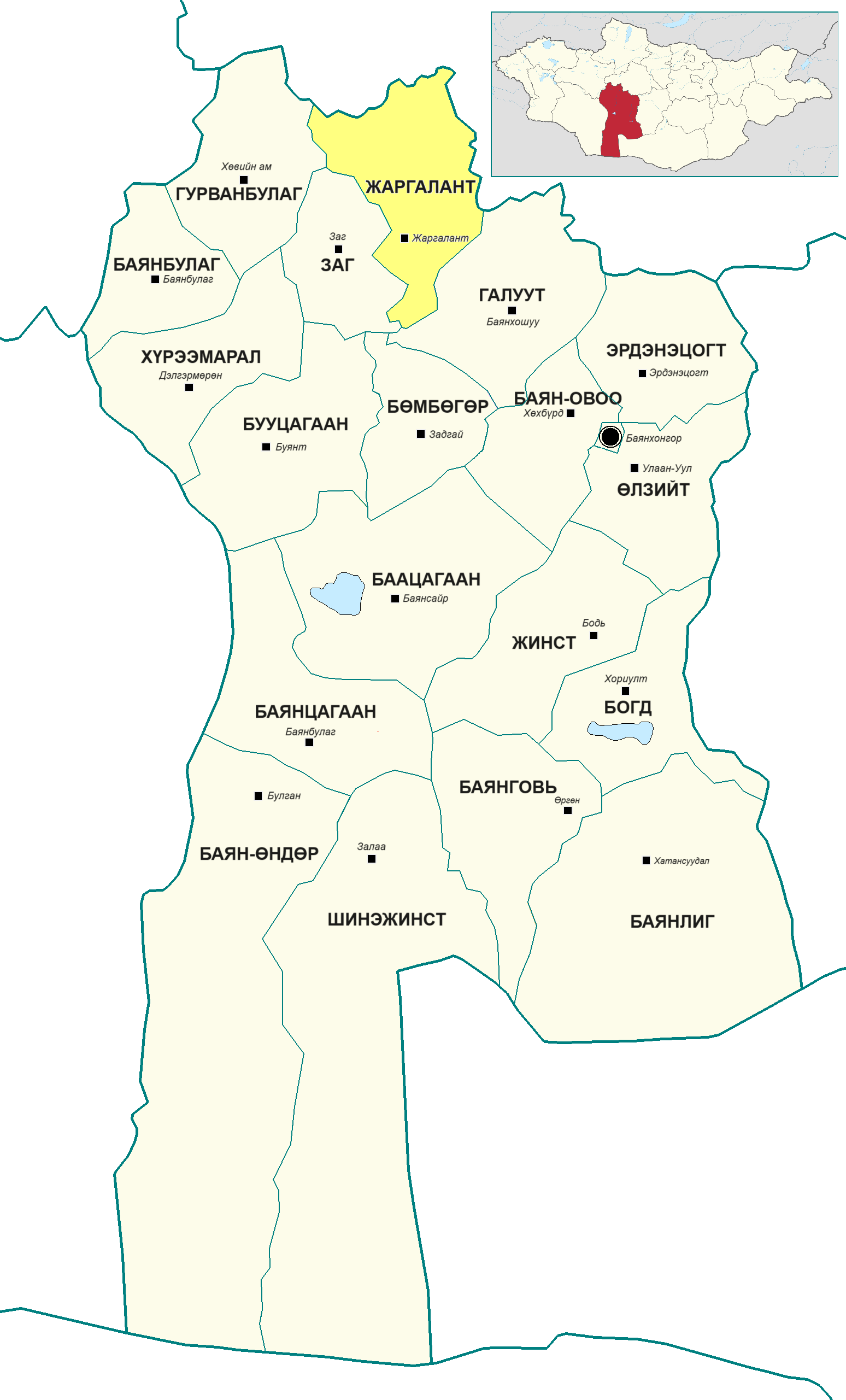
- Country: Mongolia
- Province: Bayankhongor Province

Area
  - Total: 4,174.53 km^{2} (1,611.80 sq mi)

Population (2021)
  - Total: 2,950
- Time zone: UTC+8 (UTC + 8)

Jargalant (Mongolian: Жаргалант), also known as Baidrag (Mongolian: Байдраг), is a sum (district) of Bayankhongor Province in southern Mongolia. It is bordered by Zag sum to the west, Gurvanbulag sum to the northwest, Khangai sum of Arkhangai province and Chuluut sum to the northeast, and Galuut and Bömbögör sums to the east and south, respectively.

The northern part of the district includes portions of the Untaa Yamaat mountain range. The eastern section features the Egi Pass, while the southern boundary lies approximately 2.7 km south of the southern shore of Davsan Lake. The western boundary is marked by the Zag River.

Jargalant sum is administratively divided into four bag (subdistricts): Nam Tolgoi bag, Ulziit Heights bag, Crossing Spring team, and Emeel Togol bag.

== History ==
=== Establishment of Jargalant sum (1942) ===
Jargalant sum was established on 31 March 1942 by Resolution No. 17, when Zag sum in Bayankhongor Province was divided into two separate administrative units. The new sum was formed from six bag (subdistricts) of Zag and one bag from Mandal sum, totaling seven bag. On 8 February 1942, the first meeting of the sum's representatives was held, attended by 30 delegates—29 men and one woman. The sum administration was formed with seven members, with Balgany Batchuluun (nicknamed Bundgan) elected as head, and Demberel of Sodnombaljir appointed as secretary.

The administrative center was located at Khundlen Bulag, behind Gyalankhai Mountain. This site hosted the nursing department of the hospital, the local consumers' cooperative, and the sum administration. Z. Terbish and Ch. Tserendorj were appointed as managers of the Red House. At the time of its establishment, the sum had 583 households, 1,914 residents, and a total livestock count of 75,790.

=== Early development and education (1942–1946) ===
In the years following its formation, the local administration focused on political and educational development. Lug Ravdan was appointed head of the Party cell in December 1942. In March 1943, Chimed Baljingin was appointed head of the Mongolian Revolutionary Youth Union, and in April, Tserendorj was assigned as a junior veterinarian. A literacy group consisting of 16 members was organized in May 1943 under teacher Horoldamba. In 1946, a primary school was established, with S. Choijil appointed as principal.

=== Economic and social initiatives (1944–1957) ===
Several economic developments occurred in this period. In 1944, a handicraft artel was transferred from Zag sum to Jargalant. A dairy factory was established in 1947. In 1953, the "Shine Amidral" collective was formed with 12 families, 16 members, and 455 head of livestock. The collective was led by Delger, a partisan of the People's Revolution. A union branch was created in 1955. Two years later, in 1957, the "Orgil" collective was founded at the mouth of Khokh Engeri under the leadership of A. Luvsandamba, and the "Tsetseg" collective was established in Khökh Nuur with V. Gombojav as its head.

=== Formation and unification of collectives (1956–1959) ===
Between 1956 and 1957, several agricultural groups were founded: "Khukh Nuurin Tsetseg" in Nuurii Iher rud, "Orgil" on the Ulaan Stone terrace of the Aegean Pass, and another "Shine Amidral" group in the Khovii mouth area. These groups were unified in 1959 under the "Shine Amidral" name. Chuluunbaatar, S. Sunduijav, and Namjildorj led the newly merged union. Prior to 1959, the heads of the sum and the union were separate positions. After unification, a single individual managed both roles.

=== Administrative division and geographic coverage ===
At the time, the administrative division of the sum consisted of the following bag:

- The 1st bag included Mandal and Baidrag areas.
- The 2nd bag included Tsohiot and Khondolnbulag.
- The 3rd bag covered Narij Teel and Ulziit Mod.
- The 4th bag included Ortun Teel, Hetsuugin Ovar, Modot Orgiu, Ar Amud, and Bayan tree areas.
- The 5th bag encompassed land north of the river from Shavart Bay to Khergesti.
- The 6th bag extended from the tip of Yargait to Namy Dava, including Tavankushant and Armanushant.
- The 7th bag included Nuur Hatavc.
- The 8th bag spanned from Khankhry Am to Gyalankhai, covering the area in front of the river.

=== Baidrag Fund Farming and state planning (1957–1962) ===
On 18 April 1957, Resolution No. 214 of the Council of Ministers ordered the relocation of the Aldarkhaan state farm from Zavkhan Province. Based on recommendations by a government commission, the borders of Zag, Jargalant, Mandal, and Galuut sums were revised along the Baidrag River to establish a new agricultural area called Baidrag Fund Farming.

Four years later, on 17 May 1961, Resolution No. 229 reclassified Baidrag Farm into a breeding and feeding station serving both Bayankhongor and Gobi-Altai Provinces. This station was placed under the Ministry of Economy as of 1 June 1961. In January 1962, the center of Jargalant sum was relocated to the Baidrag Fund Farming site in the Emeel Togol valley, which became the administrative and service hub. It included telecommunications offices, a gas station, pharmacy, workers' club, garages, and other industrial facilities.

=== Infrastructure modernization (1977) ===
In 1977, major development took place with financial assistance from the Soviet Union amounting to more than 70 million MNT. The area was transformed into a modern service center. Infrastructure included a 10-grade school building, a nursery-equipped kindergarten, a hot water bathing facility, and a tractor repair workshop with an annual capacity to service 25 tractors. Additional amenities included a steam boiler with eight kettles, a 400 kW power plant, and a sewage treatment system.

Residential and service structures were built, including 60 family housing units, a hospital in the central river area, red bay structures, offices, power stations, electric wells, and treatment and feeding stations. A range of livestock facilities was also developed, including 50 sheep pens (each with a 600-head capacity), 24 cattle pens, 80 livestock swimming pools, and 17 electric or drilled wells. These were funded and managed under the authority of the Council of Ministers.

=== Agricultural profile ===
The primary economic activity in Jargalant sum was livestock breeding, with approximately 80% of the total livestock classified as small animals. Agriculture was mainly focused on fodder production to support animal husbandry. Cultivation covered 11,000 hectares of arable land, with 7,500 hectares dedicated specifically to growing fodder crops.

== Geography and statistics ==
=== Land area and classification ===
Jargalant sum covers a total area of 417,453 hectares. The administrative boundaries of the sum were formalized under Resolution No. 75, issued on 4 April 1977, by the government of the Mongolian People's Republic. The land is categorized as follows:

- 1,220 hectares are designated as urban and village settlements,
- 413,096 hectares as agricultural land,
- 263 hectares as land for the road network,
- 1,581 hectares as forested land,
- 1,291 hectares as reservoir land, and
- 2 hectares as state-protected land.

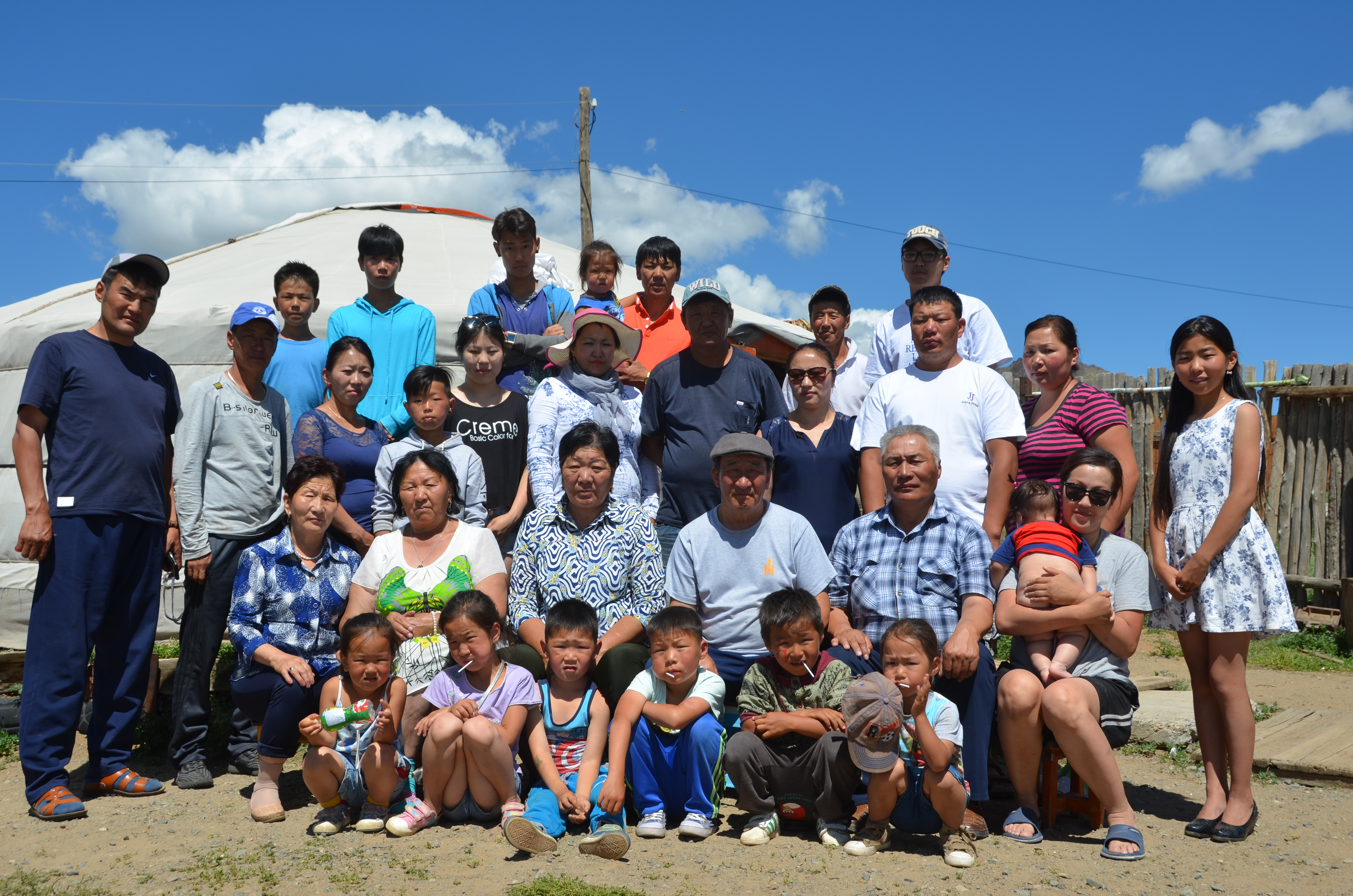
Jargalant local residents

=== Population statistics ===
The following table presents the basic population data of Jargalant sum from 2015 to 2021:

BASIC POPULATION SURVEY 2015-2021
| Year | Resident numbers | Town area | Rural area | Households |
|---|---|---|---|---|
| 2015 | 2,835 | 635 | 2,200 | 905 |
| 2016 | 2,862 | 640 | 2,222 | 907 |
| 2017 | 2,963 | 619 | 2,344 | 936 |
| 2018 | 2,908 | 604 | 2,379 | 938 |
| 2019 | 2,901 | 586 | 2,315 | 905 |
| 2020 | 2,950 | 592 | 2,358 | 849 |
| 2021 | 2,950 | no data | no data | 847 |

=== Livestock population ===
Livestock farming is a major economic activity in Jargalant sum. The livestock census from 2015 to 2021 is as follows:

Livestock statistics
| Livestocks | 2015 | 2016 | 2017 | 2018 | 2019 | 2020 | 2021 |
|---|---|---|---|---|---|---|---|
| Horse | 10,106 | 10,097 | 12,584 | 13,396 | 14,609 | 14,436 | 12,933 |
| Camel | 3 | 3 | 4 | 5 | 7 | 7 | 4 |
| Cow | 25,017 | 24,986 | 28,844 | 30,217 | 32,273 | 33,854 | 30,657 |
| Sheep | 60,815 | 60,356 | 71,425 | 70,096 | 71,898 | 69,182 | 52,873 |
| Goat | 46,428 | 45,929 | 54,053 | 54,070 | 58,723 | 54,979 | 40,557 |
| Total | 142,369 | 141,371 | 166,910 | 167,784 | 177,510 | 172,458 | 137,024 |

=== Geography ===
The soil composition of Jargalant sum varies according to elevation and location. The mountainous regions consist mainly of dark brown and brown soils, while the valley areas feature alluvial meadow soils. Based on physical and climatic conditions, the soil can be classified into three major types: mountain soil, plain soil, and river basin soil.

=== Water resources ===
According to the 2020 water census, there are a total of 166 water sources in Jargalant sum. These include:

- 51 springs,
- 10 lakes,
- 23 deep-drilled wells,
- 20 shallow or standard wells,
- 53 streams,
- 3 additional springs (possibly duplicates in classification),
- 3 boreholes, and
- 2 bridge-related water access points.

The pH of the spring waters ranges from 6.4 to 8.6, indicating a neutral to slightly alkaline environment.

== Administrative divisions ==
Jargalant Sum is administratively divided into four bags (subdistricts):

- Emeel Tolgoi
- Khundlun Bulag
- Namtolgoi
- Ulziit-Ündur

== Natural attractions ==
Binderya Lake is considered one of the most scenic natural sites in the province. It is located approximately 70 km northwest of the center of Jargalant sum. The lake is known for its fresh water supply and fish population, and it is surrounded by forested areas. The vegetation around the lake basin includes willow, poplar, sedge, and various reticulate trees. A range of aromatic and medicinal plants also grow in the area, including juniper, wild onions, sedges, sedum, dog's beak, and golden weld.

The Bayan Mountain area features various natural formations and valleys. To the west are Guagy Mouth, Chuluut, Tsagaan Syr, and the Mandal River Basin. On the left side are West and East Buets, the Buroig Valley, Camel Neck, Modot, Aguit, Tsagaan Denj, Anag, and Gozgor Shil. A branch of the mountain ridge extends across these peaks, reaching elevations of up to 2,950 meters above sea level.

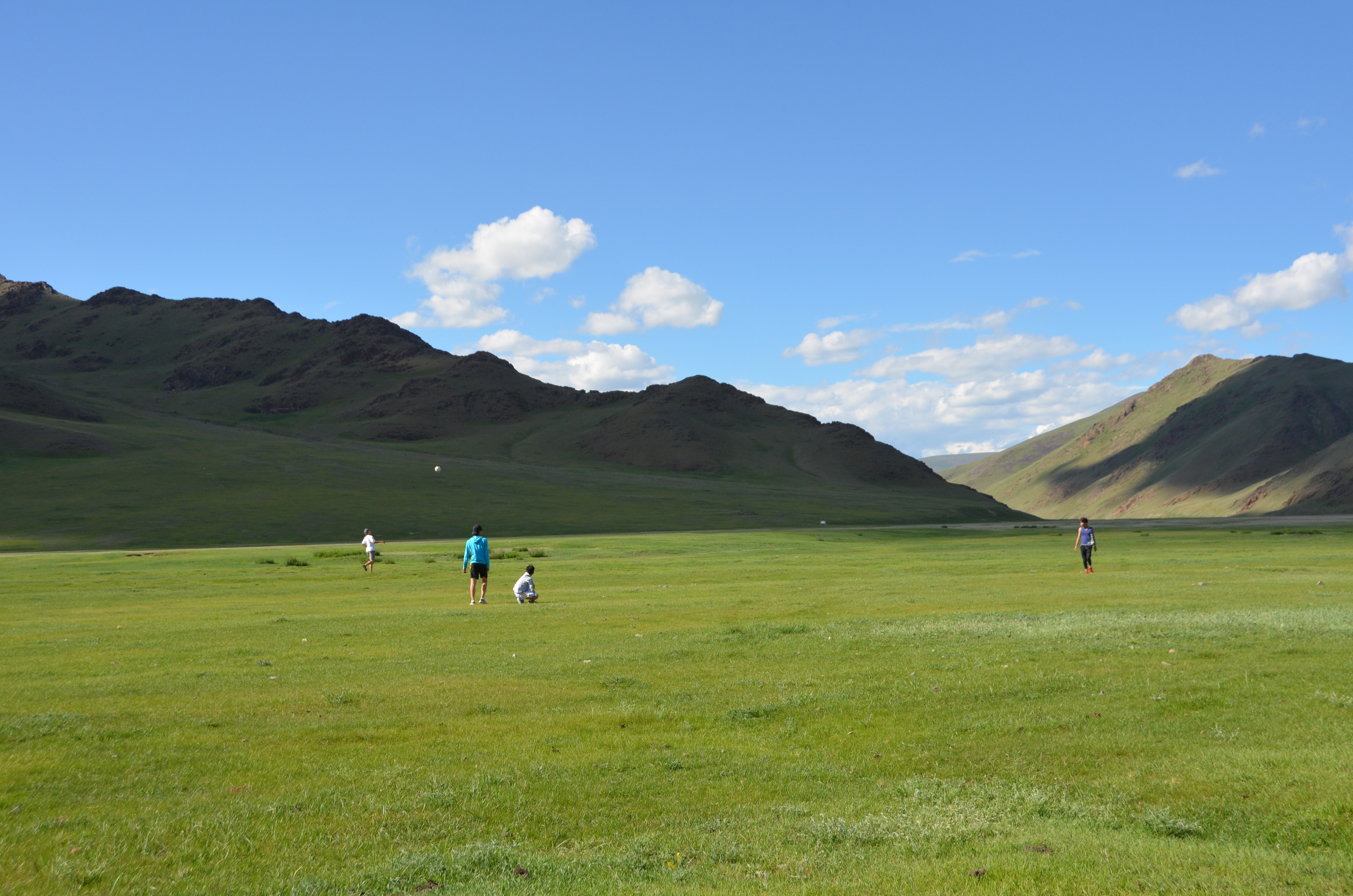
Baidrag Valley in 2016
