= Jargalan =

Jargalan may refer to:

- Jargalan Rural District, in Iran
- Jargalant, Bayankhongor, in Mongolia
- Jargal (disambiguation)
- Jargalant (disambiguation)
