= Uburchuluut Coal Mine =

Coal mine in Bömbögör, Bayankhongor, Mongolia

- Location within Mongolia
- Location: Bömbögör, Bayankhongor, Mongolia; 46°25′57.3″N 99°25′39.2″E
- Products: coal
- Discovered: 1978
- Opened: 1981

The Uburchuluut Coal Mine is a coal mine in Bömbögör District, Bayankhongor Province, Mongolia.

== History ==
The exploration of the coal deposit began in 1978. In 1981, full exploration of the whole coal deposit area began.

== Geology ==
The coal deposit belongs to the South Khangay coal basin. The surface of the coal mine lies on a hilly steppe at an altitude of 2,400 meters above sea level. It has an estimated 3.7 million tons of minable coal reserves.

== See also ==
- Mining in Mongolia
