= Gurvanbulag =

Gurvanbulag is a Mongolian place name which may refer to

- Gurvanbulag, Bayankhongor, a sum (district) of Bayankhongor Province
- Gurvanbulag, Bulgan, a sum (district) of Bulgan Province
