= Bayangovi =

District in Bayankhongor Province, Mongolia

Bayangovi District Баянговь сум ᠪᠠᠶ᠋ᠠᠩᠭ᠋ᠣᠪᠢᠰᠤᠮᠤ
- District
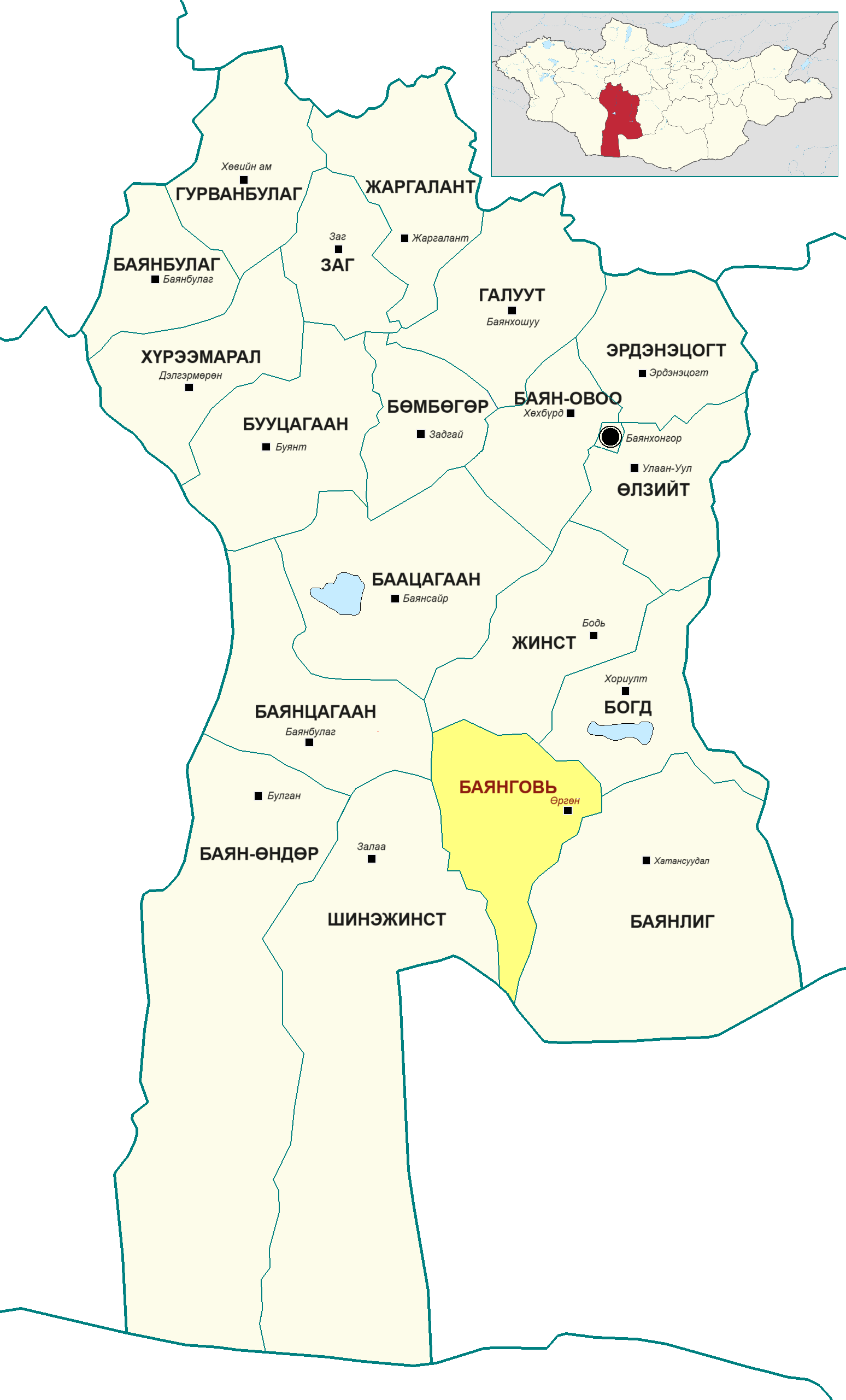

- Location in Mongolia
- Coordinates: 44°44′04″N 100°23′33″E
- Country: Mongolia
- Province: Bayankhongor

Area
  - Total: 1,800 sq mi (4,662 km^{2})
- Time zone: UTC+8

Bayangovi (Mongolian: Баянговь, also Bayangov' or Bayangobi, Rich gobi) is a sum (district) of Bayankhongor Province in south-eastern Mongolia. It is situated approximately 40 kilometres south of the lake Orog Nuur, 170 km from provincial capital Bayankhongor and 650 km south-west of Ulaanbaatar. Bayangovi is surrounded by the Ikhee Bogd mountain range, and by desert.

Outside the small town of Bayangovi are a number of desert sites of natural and cultural interest. About 90 km east of Bayangovi lies Tsagaan Agui. The cave once housed Stone Age human beings 700,000 years ago and features a crystal-lined inner chamber. At Tsagaan Bulag, 18 km south, a white rock outcrop has the faint imprint of an anthropomorphic figure. Sixty-six kilometres south-west of Bayangovi is the petrified forest at Ulaan Shand. The area is littered with stone logs and stumps.

== Administrative divisions ==
The district is divided into five bags, which are:

- Kheltgii Bulag
- Tsookhor
- Urgun
- Urkht
- Zalaa
