= Bombogor =

Bombogor can refer to:

- Bömbögör, Bayankhongor, a district in Bayankhongor Province, Mongolia
- Bombogor (chief), (died 1640) a chief of the Evenks
