= Öndör =

Öndör or Ondor (Mongolian: Өндөр, "high, tall") may refer to:

- Bor-Öndör, a city in Khentii Province in eastern Mongolia
- Bayan-Öndör (disambiguation), several districts in Mongolia
- Khutag-Öndör, district of Bulgan Province in northern Mongolia
- Öndör Gongor (1880/85–late 1920s), Mongolian who suffered from gigantism
