= Bayanteeg Coal Mine =

Coal mine in Nariinteel, Övörkhangai, Mongolia

- Location within Mongolia
- Location: Nariinteel, Övörkhangai, Mongolia; 45°41′50.3″N 101°33′36.0″E
- Products: coal
- Production: 25,000 tons (annually)
- Discovered: 1961
- Opened: 1962
- Company: Bayanteeg Shareholding Company

The Baganuur Coal Mine is a coal mine in Bayanteeg, Nariinteel District, Övörkhangai Province, Mongolia.

== History ==
The coal deposit of the mine was discovered in 1961 with a 30 km^{2} surface geological survey and seven holes drilling. In 1962, the coal began to be extracted by open-pit mining. In 1973, the exploration for groundwater was performed.

== Geology ==
The mine as a reserve of 29.6 million tons. It covers an area of 584 hectares. It belongs to Ongiyngol coal basin.

== Business ==
The mine is owned by Bayanteeg Shareholding Company.

== See also ==
- Mining in Mongolia
