= Bayanteeg =

Bag in Nariinteel, Övörkhangai, Mongolia

Coordinates: 45°42′14″N 101°34′50″E

Bayanteeg (Mongolian: Баянтээг) is a bag and coal mining settlement in Nariinteel sum (district) of Övörkhangai Province in southern Mongolia. The population of Bayanteed is 1,249

== Economy ==
- Bayanteeg Coal Mine
