= Bayan-Öndör =

Bayan-Öndör (ᠪᠠᠶᠠᠨᠥᠨᠳᠦᠷ, Баян Өндөр, Mongolian: rich plateau, Chinese: 巴彦温都尔, English: Bayan-Ondor, Bayan-Undur) may refer to:

== Mongolia ==
- several Sums (districts) in different Aimags (provinces), Mongolia
  - Bayan-Öndör, Bayankhongor
  - Bayan-Öndör, Orkhon
  - Bayan-Öndör, Övörkhangai

== China ==
- Bayanundur, Ar Horqin, a sum (Township) in Ar Horqin Banner, Inner Mongolia
