= Khüreemaral =

District in Bayankhongor Province, Mongolia

Coordinates: 46°24′31″N 98°17′13″E

Khüreemaral District Хүрээмарал сум ᠬᠦᠷᠢᠶ᠋ᠡᠮᠠᠷᠠᠯᠰᠤᠮᠤ
- District
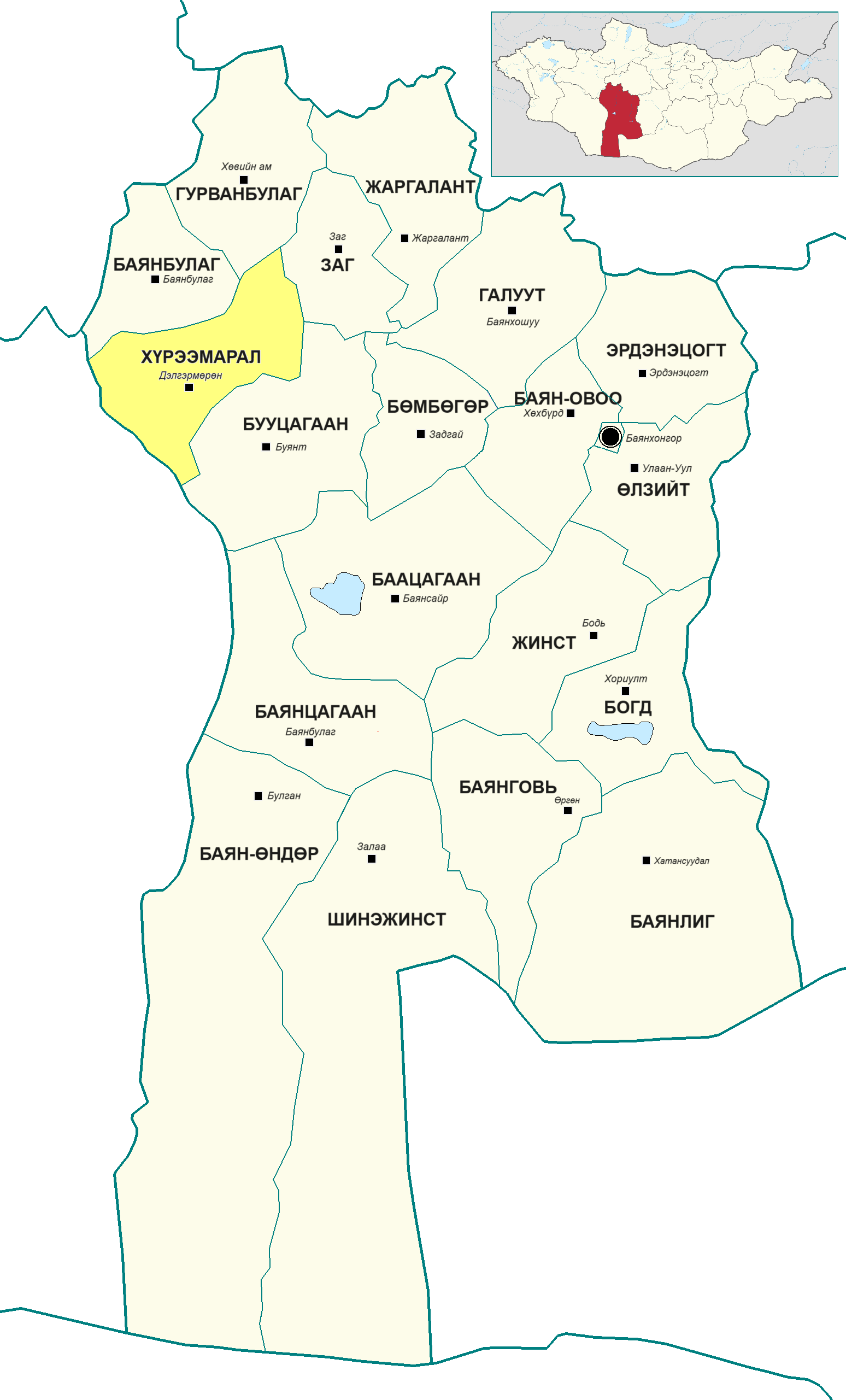
- Country: Mongolia
- Province: Bayankhongor Province

Area
  - Total: 4,328 km^{2} (1,671 sq mi)
- Time zone: UTC+8 (UTC + 8)

Khüreemaral (Mongolian: Хүрээмарал) is a sum (district) of Bayankhongor Province in southern Mongolia. In 2006, its population was 2,064.

== Administrative divisions ==
The district is divided into five bags, which are:

- Delger Murun
- Khukh Burd
- Norovlin
- Sonor
- Tsorj
