= Jargal =

Jargal (Mongolian: Жаргал, romanized: Jargal, lit. 'happiness'), is a common part of Mongolian names, signifying:

People

- Rinchinnyamyn Amarjargal, a former prime minister of Mongolia
- Pürevjargalyn Lkhamdegd, a Mongolian olympic judoka

Places

- Jargalant khot, a former official name for Khovd city
- Mönkhkhairkhan Mountain, a mountain in Khovd Province, Mongolia
- several sums (districts) in different aimags (provinces) of Mongolia:
  - Jargalant, Khovd
  - Jargalant, Arkhangai
  - Jargalant, Bayankhongor
  - Dalanjargalan, Dornogovi
  - Bayanjargalan, Dundgovi
  - Jargalan, Govi-Altai
  - Jargaltkhaan, Khentii
  - Jargalant, Khövsgöl
  - Jargalant, Orkhon
  - Bayanjargalan, Töv
  - Jargalant, Töv

== See also ==
- etymologically unrelated, a novel by Victor Hugo, see Bug-Jargal
