= Ölziit, Bayankhongor =

District in Bayankhongor Province, Mongolia

Coordinates: 46°04′00″N 100°48′57″E

Ölziit District Өлзийт сум ᠥᠯᠵᠡᠶᠢᠲᠦᠰᠤᠮᠤ
- District
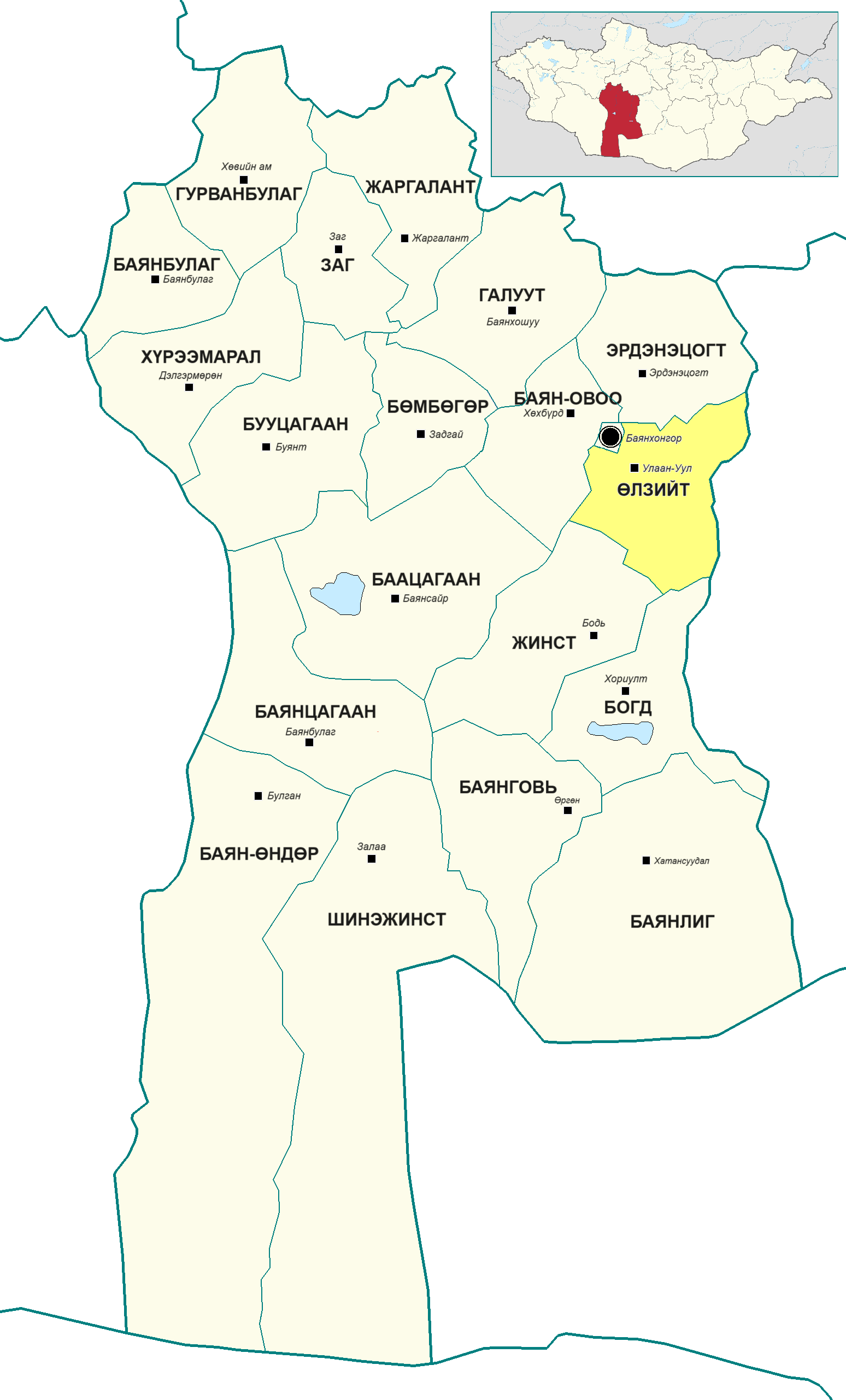
- Country: Mongolia
- Province: Bayankhongor Province

Area
  - Total: 3,853 km^{2} (1,488 sq mi)
- Time zone: UTC+8 (UTC + 8)

Ölziit is a sum (district) of Bayankhongor Province in southern Mongolia. In 2006, its population was 3,353.

== Administrative divisions ==
The district is divided into six bags, which are:

- Bain Am
- Biiriin Uulzvar
- Burkhant
- Khudag Urt
- Ulaan Uul
- Yoliin Am
