= Tsagaan Agui =

Cave in Bayankhongor, Mongolia

- White Cave
- Interactive map of Tsagaan Agui
- Location: Bayankhongor, Mongolia
- Coordinates: 44°42′43.3″N 101°10′13.4″E
- Discovery: 1972

Tsagaan Agui (Mongolian: Цагаан агуй), located in the Gobi Desert of southwest-central Mongolia, is a stratified Paleolithic cave site with a calcium carbonate crystal-lined inner chamber. The cave has yielded abundant archaeological materials, some perhaps as old as ca. 700,000 years ago. The cave has been (and continues to be) used sporadically by Buddhists as a pilgrimage destination. The cave has been under the protection of the Mongolian government since 1988.

== Geographical location ==
Tsagaan Agui is located in Bayankhongor province (aimaq) in the southern foothills of the Gobi Altay Mountains at 44º 42´ 43.3” N, 101 º 10´13.4” E, about 40 km northeast of the Bayan Lig county (suum) administrative center, southwest of the Zuun Bogd Uul (Baga Bogd Uul) mountain range.

== History ==
The cave was discovered by Mongolian archaeologists in 1972 and first investigated by the Joint Soviet-Mongolian Historical-Cultural Expedition in 1987. In 1988–1989, excavations were continued by a Soviet-Mongolian Stone Age research team led by A. P. Derevianko and D. Tseveendorj. Between 1995 and 2000, excavations were undertaken at Tsagaan Agui by the Mongolian-Russian-American Archaeological Expeditions (JMRAAE). JMRAAE reinitiated excavations at Tsagaan Agui in 2021 with support from the Leakey Foundation and the University of Arizona's Je Tsongkhapa Endowment for Central and Inner Asian Archaeology.

== Cave structure and stratigraphy ==
Tsagaan Agui consists of five parts: 1) the Entrance Terrace, 2) the Entrance Grotto, 3) the Main Chamber, 4) the Inner Chamber, 5) and the Lower Grotto.

Based on multiple analyses of the cave deposits, sedimentation is thought to have occurred during four cycles:

1. Strata 10–11 of the cave's entryway, Stratum 6 in the lower grotto, Strata 13–14 in the entry grotto, and Strata 12–13 in the main chamber. A wetter and warmer environment prevailed. In this sedimentation cycle, around 70–90 % of the pollen is associated with trees and shrubs. The remains of spruce and pine pollen were detected.
2. Strata 6–11 in the Main Chamber and Stratum 5 in the Lower Grotto. A cooler and drier environment than previously prevailed. Investigations show that arboreal species such as pine, birch, and spruce predominated in this part of the sedimentation cycle. Pollen of elm, maple, oak, lime, fir, honeysuckle, and hornbeam was also discovered here.
3. Lower part of Stratum 4 along with Stratum 5 in the entryway zone and Strata 3–5 in the Main Chamber. A cooler climate in comparison with the previous period was reconstructed here. A steppe ecosystem was most noticeable despite the presence of a forest complex. Among the spore and pollen findings, herbaceous and shrubby species predominated. However, the pollen of Picea, Pinus, and Betula in smaller amounts were also detected.
4. Stratum 2 in the entryway, the Entrance Grotto, and the cave's Main Chamber. A drier environment than previously was reconstructed. The debris revealed in this part of the cave includes a mixture of gravel, limestone, and calcite crystals.

=== Archaeological finds ===
The earliest cultural remains revealed in the cave are associated with the first period of sedimentation (Stratum 13 in the entrance grotto and Stratum 12–13 in the Main chamber). Bifacially worked tools, combination tools, flakes, and retouched remnants were recovered here.

Different forms of cores and core preforms, core-like pieces, blade spalls, flakes and chips, only a few with retouched platforms, and just one faceted platform were recovered from the second sedimentation cycle.

Levallois-like flake cores, core platforms, core-like pieces, part of a Levallois blade, and flakes were observed in the third cycle of sedimentation.

Remains of tools associated with the fourth sedimentation cycle are quite different from artifacts of the previous cycles. Tools were prepared on high-quality lithic raw material and a core reduction strategy was mainly used for producing bladelets. Scrapers, end-scrapers, trimmed tools, as well as retouched blades, burin-like tools, and combination tools were also recovered from this horizon.

Based on the analysis of artifacts from the lowermost horizons at Tsagaan Agui Cave, it is suggested that a Levallois-Acheulean like industry existed in Mongolia as early as 500-400 thousand years ago. According to Derevianko and Okladnikov, similar technologies appeared in Central Asia because of the in-migration of a population using bifacial technology to this region. It is also assumed that the bearers of Levallois-Acheulean tools emigrated from central Kazakhstan (Lake Balkhash region) to southern Mongolia. Tools prepared on Levallois-like cores belonged to the Late Middle Paleolithic (early Zyrian glacial) period. Blades were found in the cave belonging to the Early Upper Paleolithic period. These blades reveal that the first Initial Upper Paleolithic blade technologies were present in the Gobi by around 27–33,000 years ago (i.e., the last half of the Kargan interstadial).

== Floral and faunal remains ==
Pollen of broad-leaved species such as elm, hornbeam, maple, and lime and grains of grasses including members of the Moraceae, Lonicera, and Juglans families were detected. Myrica and Ostrya seeds showed that they are no later than the Pleistocene.

A relatively humid environment was reconstructed in the bottom of the sediment column, therefore animal remains were only recovered from the upper units, especially from Strata 1–5 in the Main Chamber. Mammals associated with open steppes and montane niches, including kulan, arğalı, Siberian goat and dzeren (all currently present in Mongolia) dominated the faunal assemblage. In addition, bones of rhinoceros, cave hyenas and Tibetan antelope (Pantholops or chiru) were discovered in the cave's Pleistocene horizons.

== See also ==
- List of caves
- History of Mongolia
