= Buutsagaan =

District in Bayankhongor Province, Mongolia

Coordinates: 46°10′23″N 98°41′43″E

Buutsagaan District Бууцагаан сум ᠪᠤᠤᠴᠠᠭᠠᠨᠰᠤᠮᠤ
- District
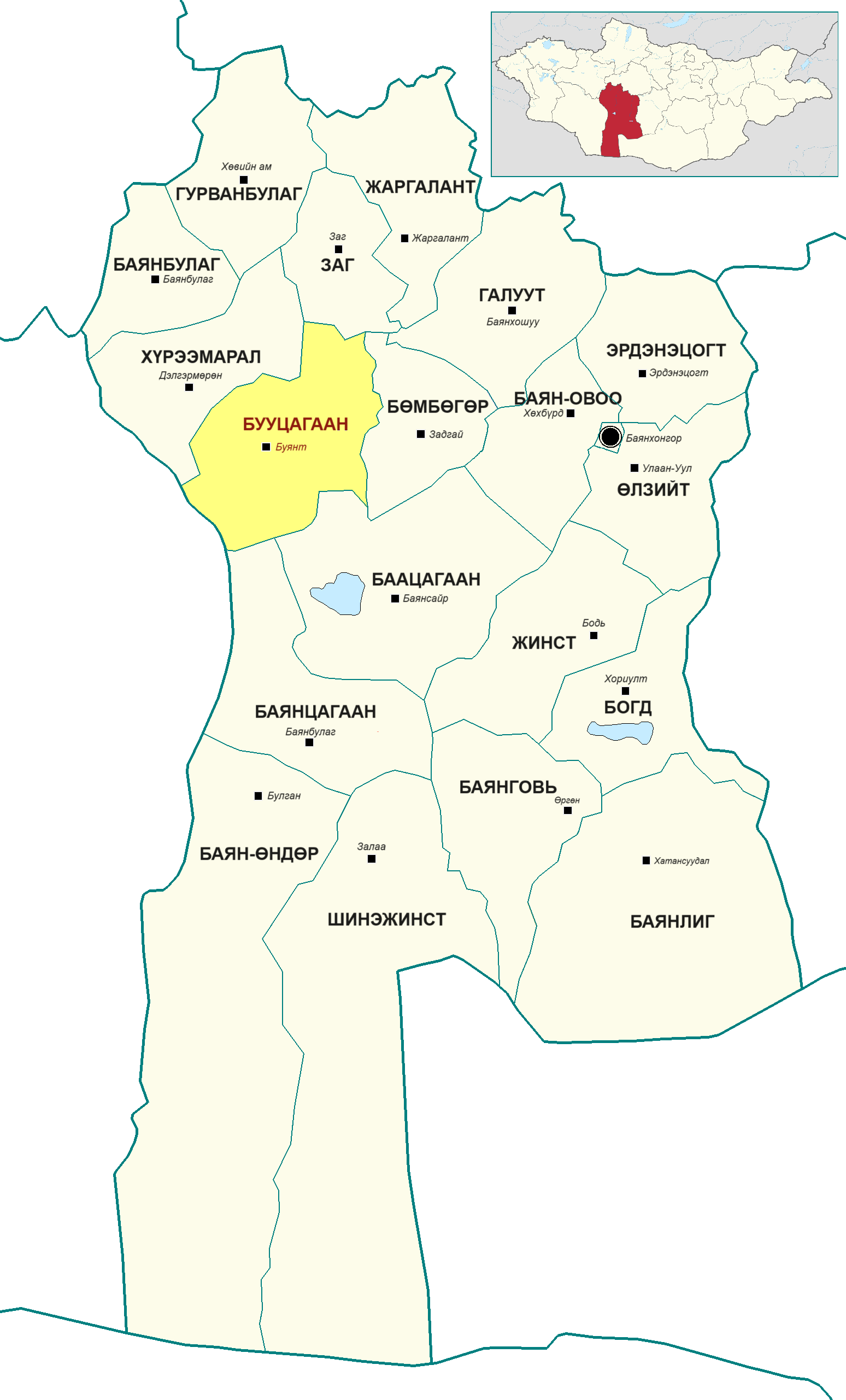
- Country: Mongolia
- Province: Bayankhongor Province

Area
  - Total: 5,840 km^{2} (2,250 sq mi)

Population (2025)
  - Total: ▲3,602
- Time zone: UTC+8 (UTC + 8)

Buutsagaan (Mongolian: Бууцагаан, White Gun) is a sum (district) of Bayankhongor Province in southern Mongolia. In 2025, the population was 3,602.

== Administrative divisions ==
The district is divided into six bags, which are:

- Bayan
- Bayanburd
- Buyant
- Naran
- Temeet
- Ulziit
