= Shinejinst =

District in Bayankhongor Province, Mongolia

Coordinates: 44°32′53″N 99°16′39″E

Shinejinst District Шинэжинст сум ᠰᠢᠨᠡᠵᠢᠩᠰᠡᠲᠦᠰᠤᠮᠤ
- District
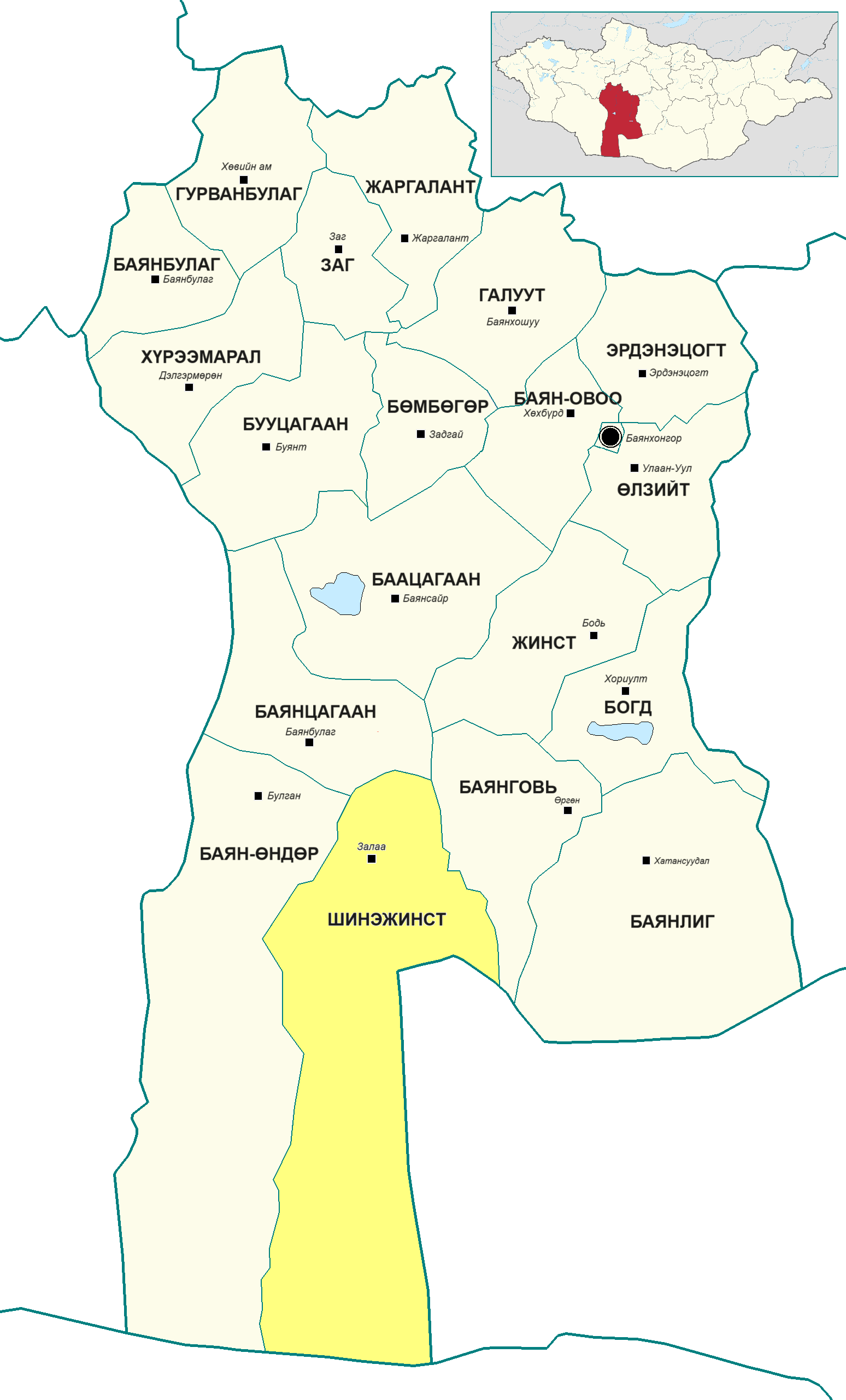
- Shinejinst District in Bayankhongor Province
- Country: Mongolia
- Province: Bayankhongor Province

Area
  - Total: 16,501 km^{2} (6,371 sq mi)

Population
  - Total: 2,187
  - Density: 0.1325/km^{2} (0.3433/sq mi)
- Time zone: UTC+8 (UTC + 8)

Shinejinst (Mongolian: Шинэжинст, New Jinst) is a sum (district) of Bayankhongor Province in southern Mongolia. In 2006, its population was 2,187.

== Administrative divisions ==
The district is divided into four bags, which are:

- Ekhen Khavtsgai
- Erdeneshand
- Urtiin Gol
- Zaraa
