= Bayanbulag =

District in Bayankhongor, Mongolia

Bayanbulag District Mongolian: Баянбулаг сум ᠪᠠᠶ᠋ᠠᠨᠪᠤᠯᠠᠭᠰᠤᠮᠤ
- District
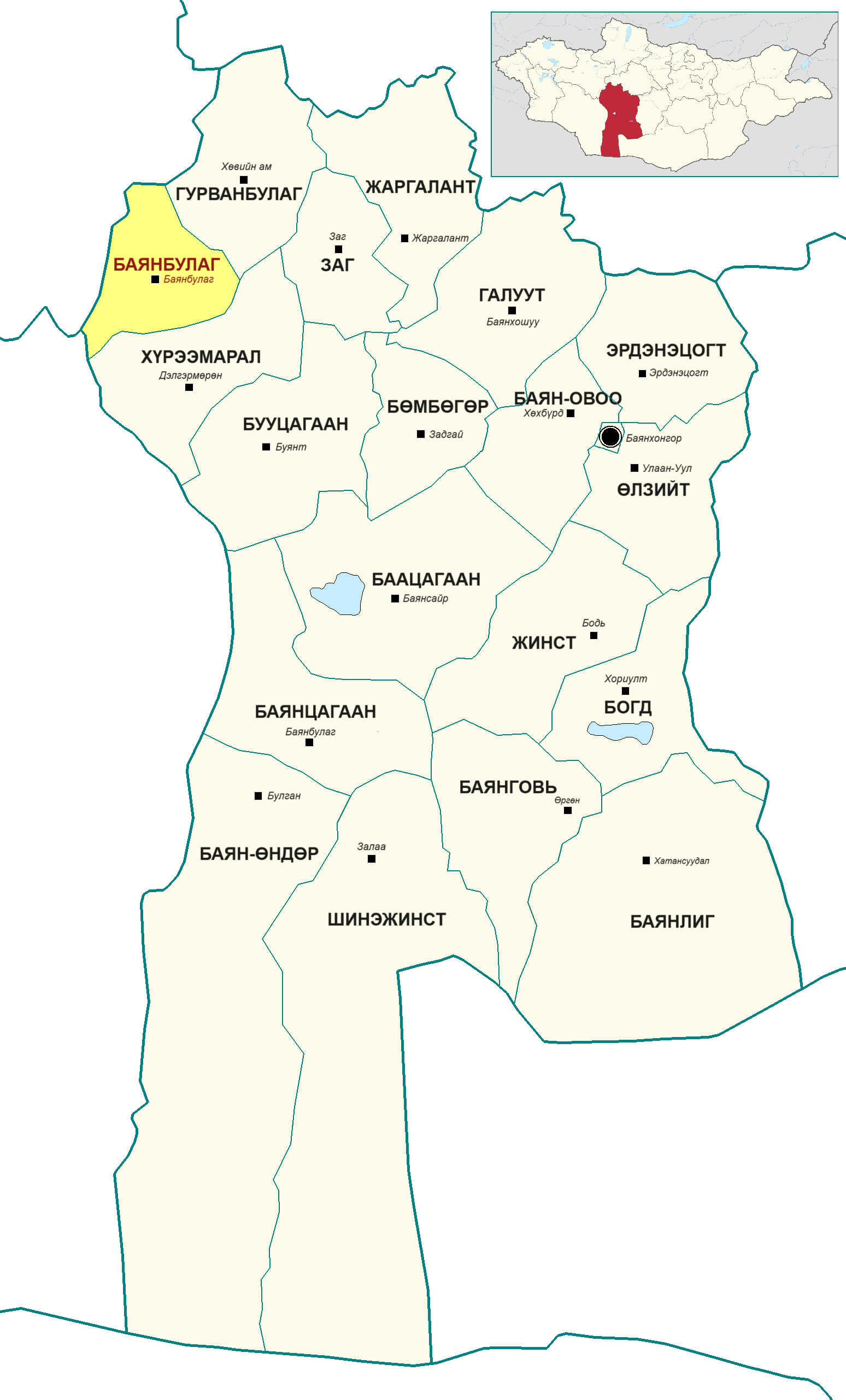

- Location in Mongolia
- Coordinates: 46°48′29″N 98°05′28″E
- Country: Mongolia
- Province: Bayankhongor

Area
  - Total: 1,220 sq mi (3,170 km^{2})
- Time zone: UTC+8

Bayanbulag (Mongolian: Баянбулаг, rich spring) is a sum (district) of Bayankhongor Province in southern Mongolia. In 2006, its population was 2,143.

== Climate ==
Bayanbulag has a cold semi-arid climate (Köppen climate classification BSk) with mild summers and severely cold winters. The climate is very dry; most precipitation falls in the summer as rain, with some snow in the adjacent months of May and September. Winters are very dry.

Climate data for Bayanbulag, elevation 2,255 m (7,398 ft), (1991–2020 normals, extremes 1975–2020)
Month	Jan	Feb	Mar	Apr	May	Jun	Jul	Aug	Sep	Oct	Nov	Dec	Year
Record high °C (°F)	4.0 (39.2)	6.4 (43.5)	13.7 (56.7)	23.2 (73.8)	27.9 (82.2)	29.3 (84.7)	32.7 (90.9)	28.6 (83.5)	23.8 (74.8)	19.6 (67.3)	10.6 (51.1)	7.8 (46.0)	32.7 (90.9)
Mean daily maximum °C (°F)	−13.3 (8.1)	−9.3 (15.3)	−1.2 (29.8)	7.2 (45.0)	13.3 (55.9)	19.0 (66.2)	21.3 (70.3)	19.5 (67.1)	13.2 (55.8)	5.1 (41.2)	−4.1 (24.6)	−11.2 (11.8)	5.0 (40.9)
Daily mean °C (°F)	−22.6 (−8.7)	−19.0 (−2.2)	−10.3 (13.5)	−0.1 (31.8)	6.1 (43.0)	12.4 (54.3)	14.6 (58.3)	12.2 (54.0)	5.3 (41.5)	−3.5 (25.7)	−13.0 (8.6)	−20.3 (−4.5)	−3.2 (26.3)
Mean daily minimum °C (°F)	−30.2 (−22.4)	−27.5 (−17.5)	−18.6 (−1.5)	−7.9 (17.8)	−2.1 (28.2)	4.3 (39.7)	7.0 (44.6)	4.3 (39.7)	−3.0 (26.6)	−10.8 (12.6)	−19.9 (−3.8)	−27.3 (−17.1)	−11.0 (12.2)
Record low °C (°F)	−48.1 (−54.6)	−45.0 (−49.0)	−40.2 (−40.4)	−35.4 (−31.7)	−23.8 (−10.8)	−11.4 (11.5)	−7.8 (18.0)	−9.0 (15.8)	−17.3 (0.9)	−29.9 (−21.8)	−40.4 (−40.7)	−45.5 (−49.9)	−48.1 (−54.6)
Average precipitation mm (inches)	1.1 (0.04)	1.4 (0.06)	4.7 (0.19)	4.2 (0.17)	8.8 (0.35)	28.0 (1.10)	46.5 (1.83)	32.5 (1.28)	11.1 (0.44)	4.1 (0.16)	1.9 (0.07)	1.3 (0.05)	145.8 (5.74)
Average precipitation days (≥ 1 mm)	0.4	0.3	0.9	0.9	1.7	3.8	6.1	4.9	2.1	1.2	0.7	0.4	23.0
Average snowy days	2.4	2.3	4.0	4.6	2.0	0.0	0.0	0.0	0.0	3.5	3.2	2.8	24.9
Average relative humidity (%)	63	57	54	49	41	42	49	56	49	58	62	65	54
Source 1: NOAA (humidity 1981–2010)
Source 2: Office of Meteorology and Environmental Analysis Starlings Roost Weather

== Administrative divisions ==
The district is divided into four bags, which are:

- Ar Jargalant
- Burd
- Sangiin dalai
- Khangal
