= Jinst =

District in Bayankhongor Province, Mongolia

Jinst District Жинст сум ᠵᠢᠩᠰᠡᠲᠦᠰᠤᠮᠤ
- District
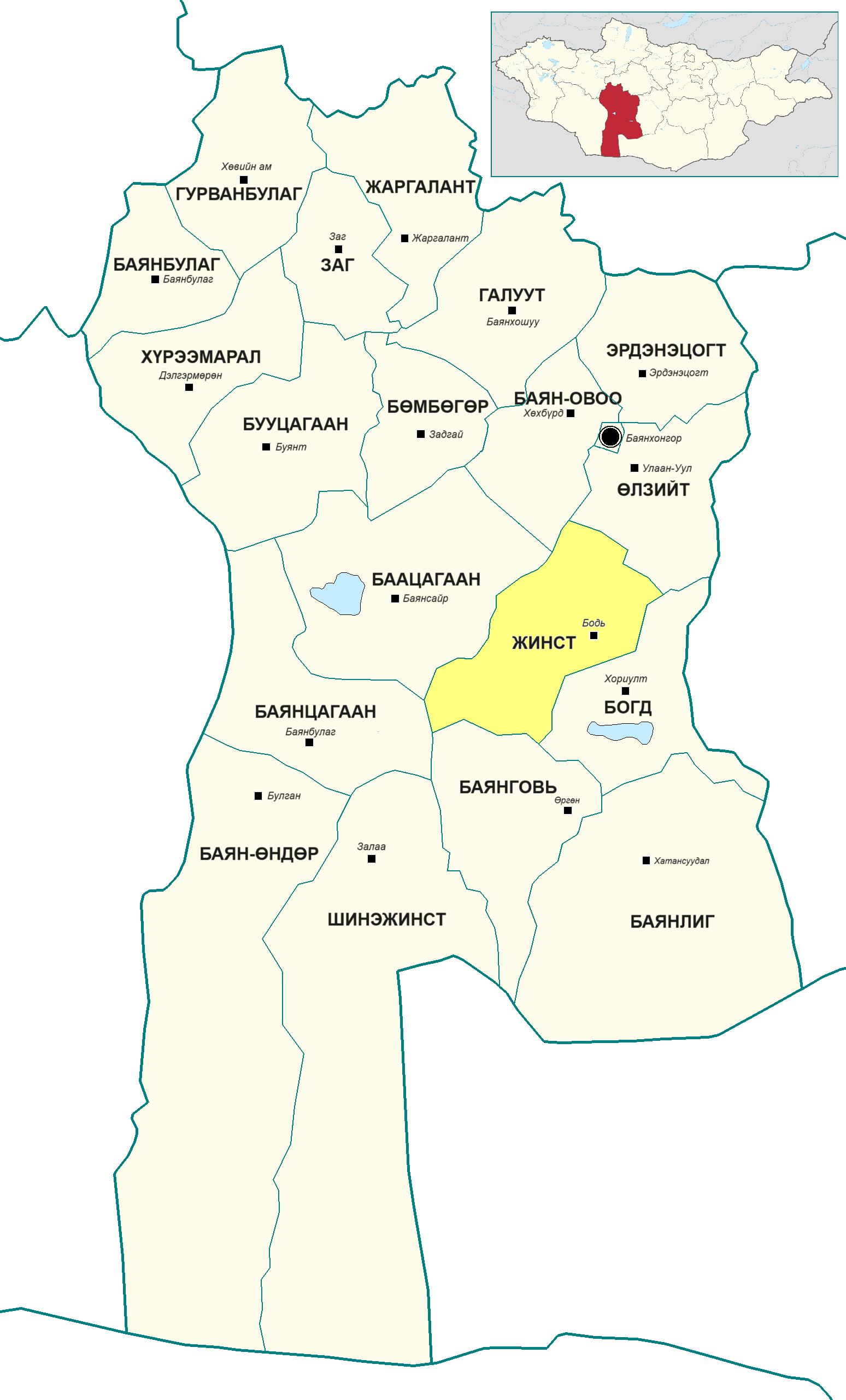
- Jinst District in Bayankhongor Province

- Location in Mongolia
- Coordinates: 45°24′39″N 100°34′36″E
- Country: Mongolia
- Province: Bayankhongor Province

Area
  - Land: 2,051 sq mi (5,313 km^{2})

Population (2007)
  - Total: 2,023
  - Density: 0.83/sq mi (0.32/km^{2})

Jinst (Mongolian: Жинст) is a sum (district) of Bayankhongor Province in southern Mongolia. In 2006, its population was 2,023. Its population in 2025 was 2,110.

== Administrative divisions ==
The district is divided into five bags, which are:

- Bodi
- Khuis
- Khunug
- Tsagaan Us
- Uu-Bulan
