= Bogd, Bayankhongor =

District in Bayankhongor Province, Mongolia

Coordinates: 45°11′54″N 100°46′31″E

Bogd District Богд сум ᠪᠣᠭᠳᠠᠰᠤᠮᠤ
- District
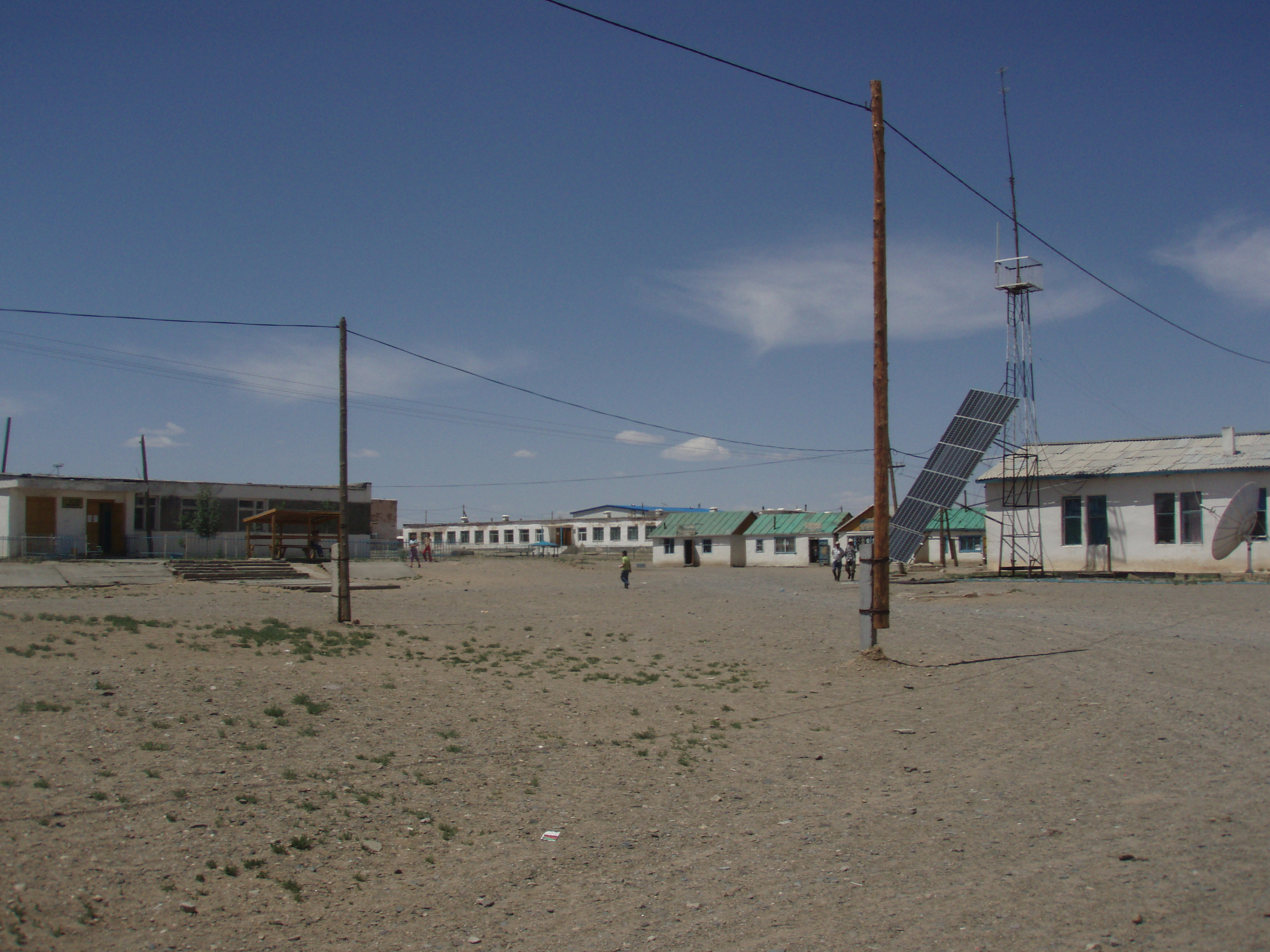

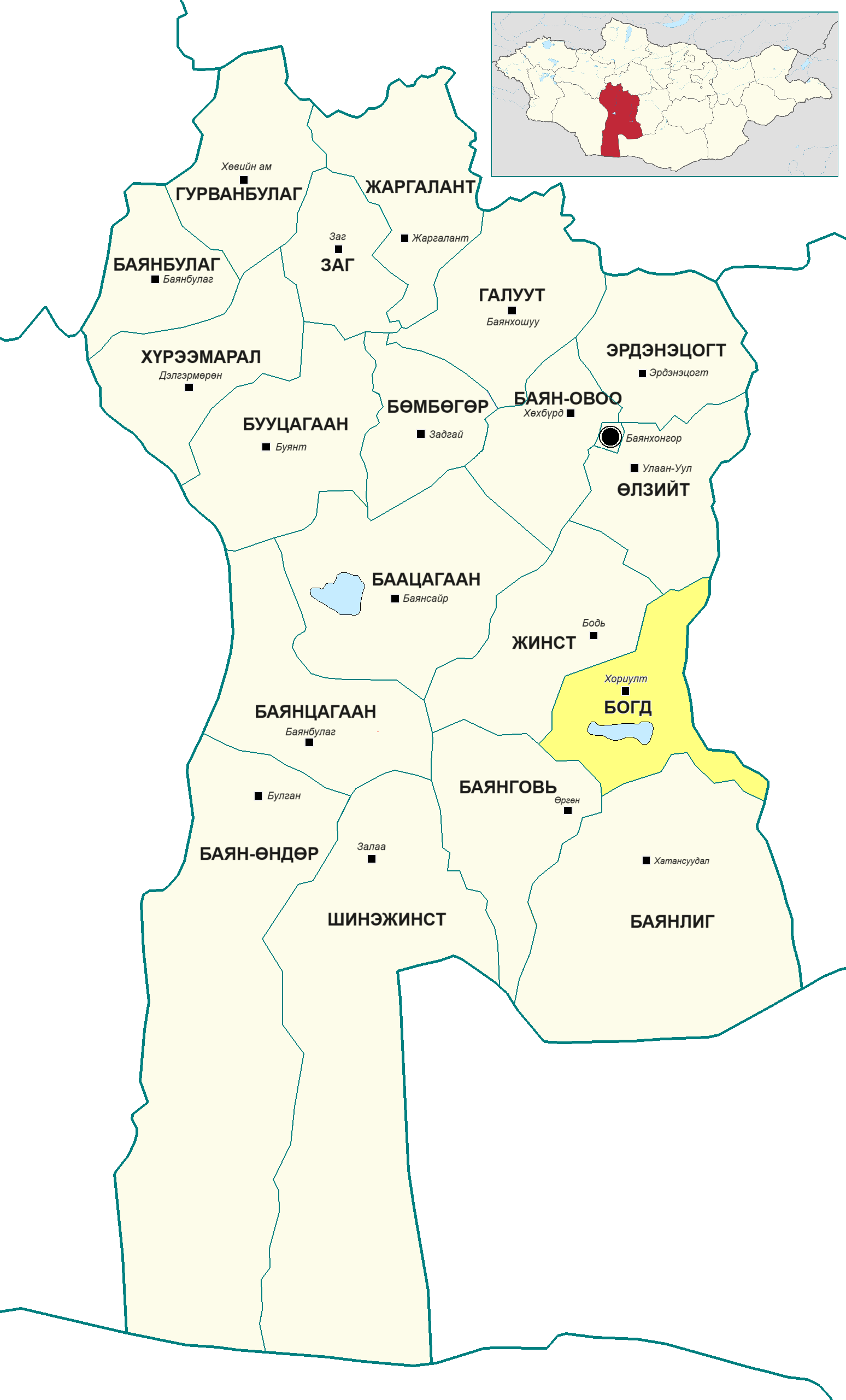
- Bogd District in Bayankhongor Province
- Country: Mongolia
- Province: Bayankhongor Province

Area
  - Total: 3,983 km^{2} (1,538 sq mi)
- Time zone: UTC+8 (UTC + 8)

Bogd (Mongolian: Богд, saint, holy) is a sum (district) of Bayankhongor Province in south-western Mongolia. In 2006, its population was 2,900.

== Geology ==
The Orog Lake sits at the center of the district.

== Administrative divisions ==
The district is divided into six bags, which are:

- Altai
- Buyant
- Gurvan Gol
- Khoriult
- Luugar
- Tselger
