= Nariinteel, Övörkhangai =

District in Övörkhangai Province, Mongolia

Coordinates: 45°57′52″N 101°27′35″E

Nariinteel District Нарийнтээл сум ᠨᠠᠷᠢᠨᠲᠡᠭᠡᠯᠢᠰᠤᠮᠤ
- District
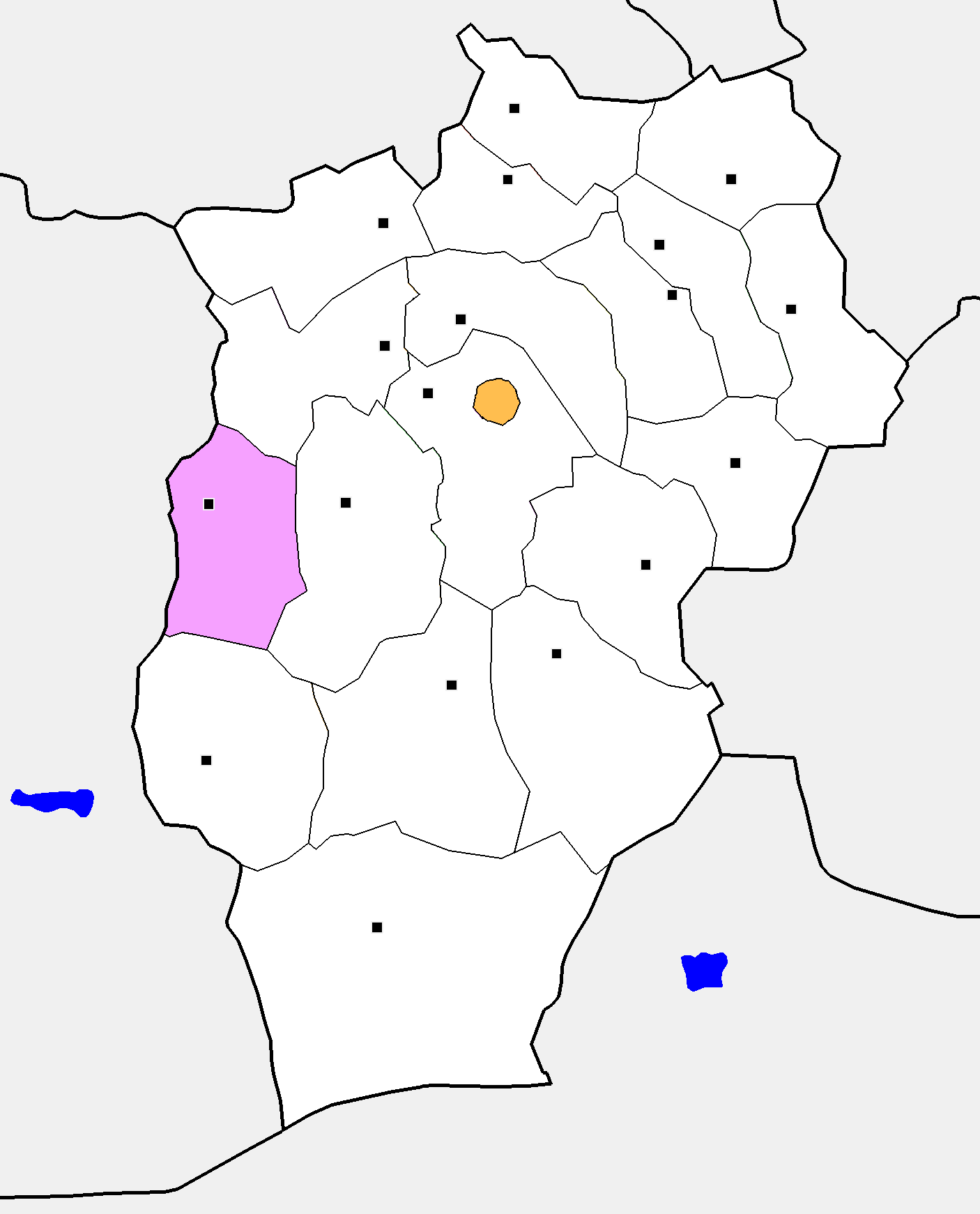
- Nariinteel District in Övörkhangai Province
- Country: Mongolia
- Province: Övörkhangai Province
- Time zone: UTC+8 (UTC + 8)

Nariinteel (Mongolian: Нарийнтээл) is a sum (district) of Övörkhangai Province in southern Mongolia. The sum centre is 135 km to the West from Övörkhangai aimag centre Arvaikheer. In 2008, its population was 3,736.

The Bayanteeg Coal Mine and the Bayanteeg settlement are approx. 40 km to the South from the sum centre.

== Administrative divisions ==
The district is divided into four bags, which are:

- Bayanteeg
- Sharga
- Tsagaan-Ovoo
- Undurkhumug

== Economy ==
- Bayanteeg Coal Mine
