= Orog Lake =

Lake in Bayankhongor Province, Mongolia

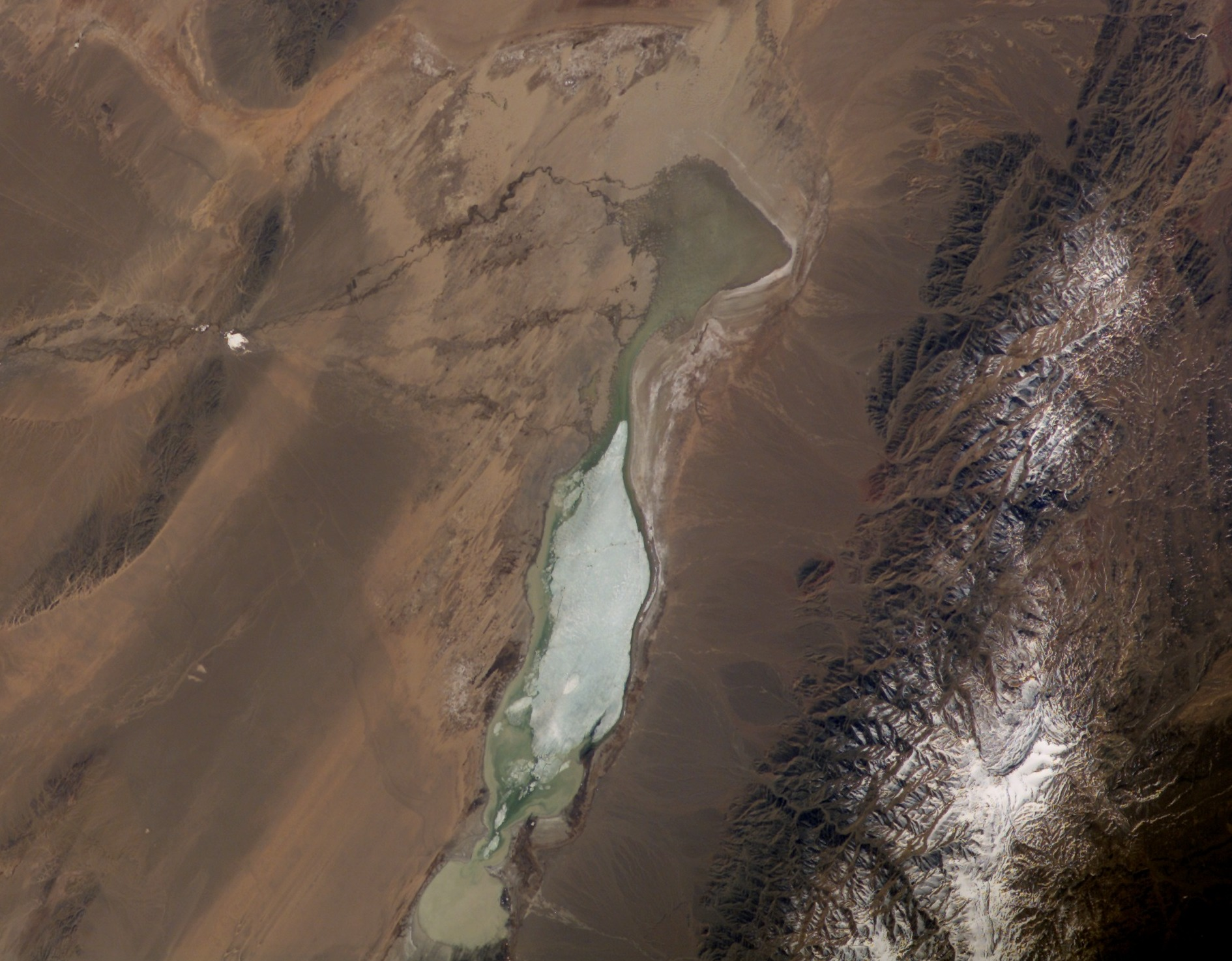
- View of lake taken during ISS Expedition 16

- Location within Mongolia
- Location: Bayankhongor Province
- Coordinates: 45°03′18″N 100°42′17″E
- Basin countries: Mongolia
- Max. length: 31.8 km (19.8 mi)
- Max. width: 7.7 km (4.8 mi)
- Surface area: 140 km^{2} (54 sq mi)
- Average depth: 3 m (9.8 ft)
- Max. depth: 5 m (16 ft)
- Water volume: 0.420 km^{3} (340,000 acre⋅ft)
- Surface elevation: 1,217 m (3,993 ft)

Orog Lake, or Orog Nuur (Mongolian: Орог нуур) is a lake located in the district of Bogd, in Bayankhongor Province, Mongolia.

It is situated at an altitude of 1216 m above sea level. Fed by the waters of the river Tüyn Gol. The shores are low and sandy, with salt marshes in some places. Fresh or salt water predominates depending on the amount of rainfall. Frozen from November to April. It is rich in fish and waterfowl.

Uranium and arsenic accumulate in this lake during evaporation, although, under very dry conditions, some As(V) reacts with ferrihydrite and is removed.
