= Bayanlig =

District in Bayankhongor Province, Mongolia

Bayanlig District Баянлиг сум ᠪᠠᠶ᠋ᠠᠨᠯᠢᠭᠰᠤᠮᠤ
- District
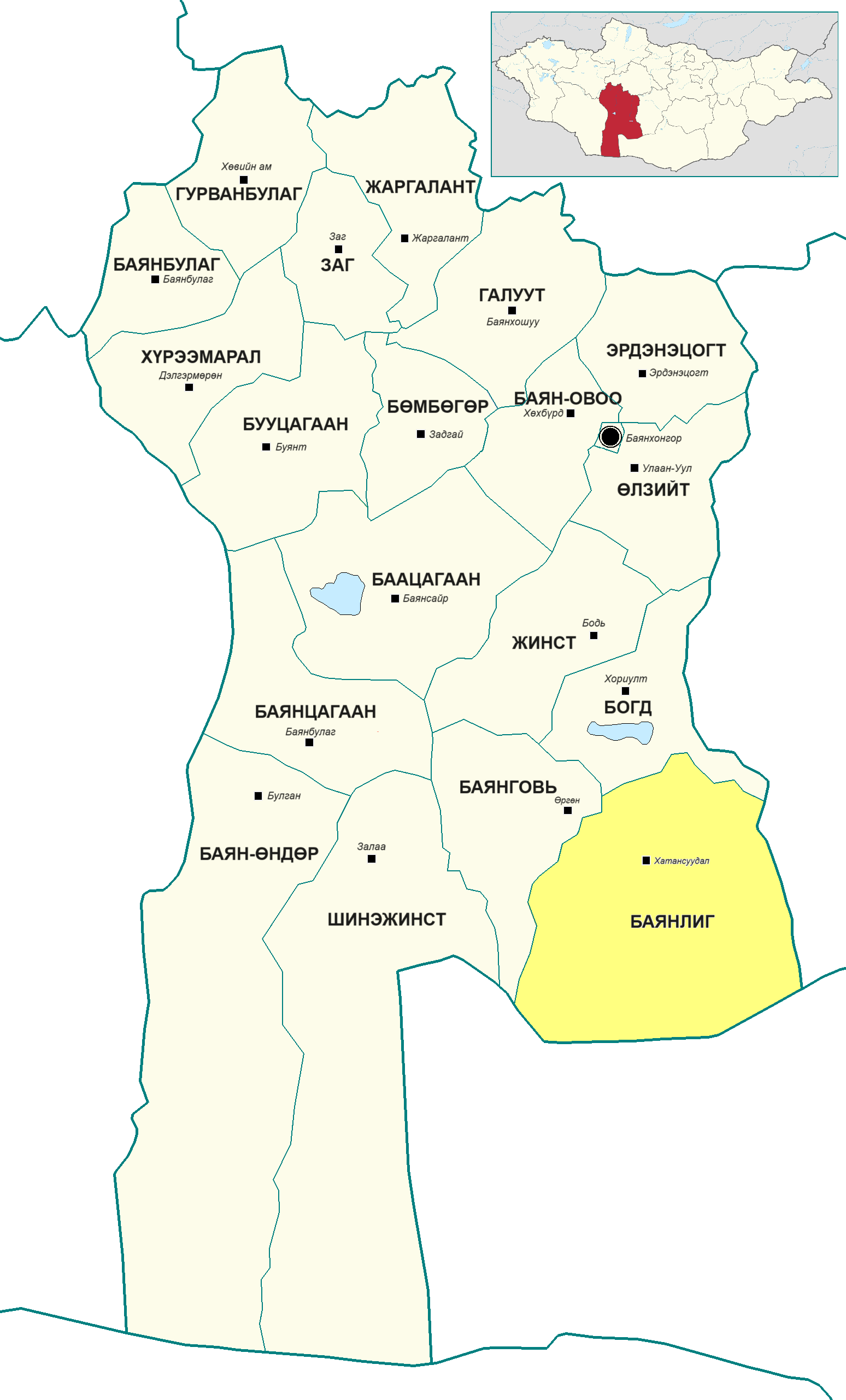

- Location in Mongolia
- Coordinates: 44°32′43″N 100°49′42″E
- Country: Mongolia
- Province: Bayankhongor

Area
  - District: 4,602 sq mi (11,918 km^{2})

Population (2006)
  - District: 3,316
  - Urban: 805
- Time zone: UTC+8

Bayanlig (Mongolian: Баянлиг, Rich League) is a sum (district) of Bayankhongor Province in southern Mongolia. In 2006, its population was 3,316.

== Administrative divisions ==
The district is divided into five bags, which are:

- Baga Bayan
- Bayan-Aarag
- Ikh Bayan
- Ikh Khalbagant
- Khatan Suudal
