= Galuut =

District in Bayankhongor Province, Mongolia

Galuut District Галуут сум ᠭᠠᠯᠠᠭᠲᠤᠰᠤᠮᠤ
- District
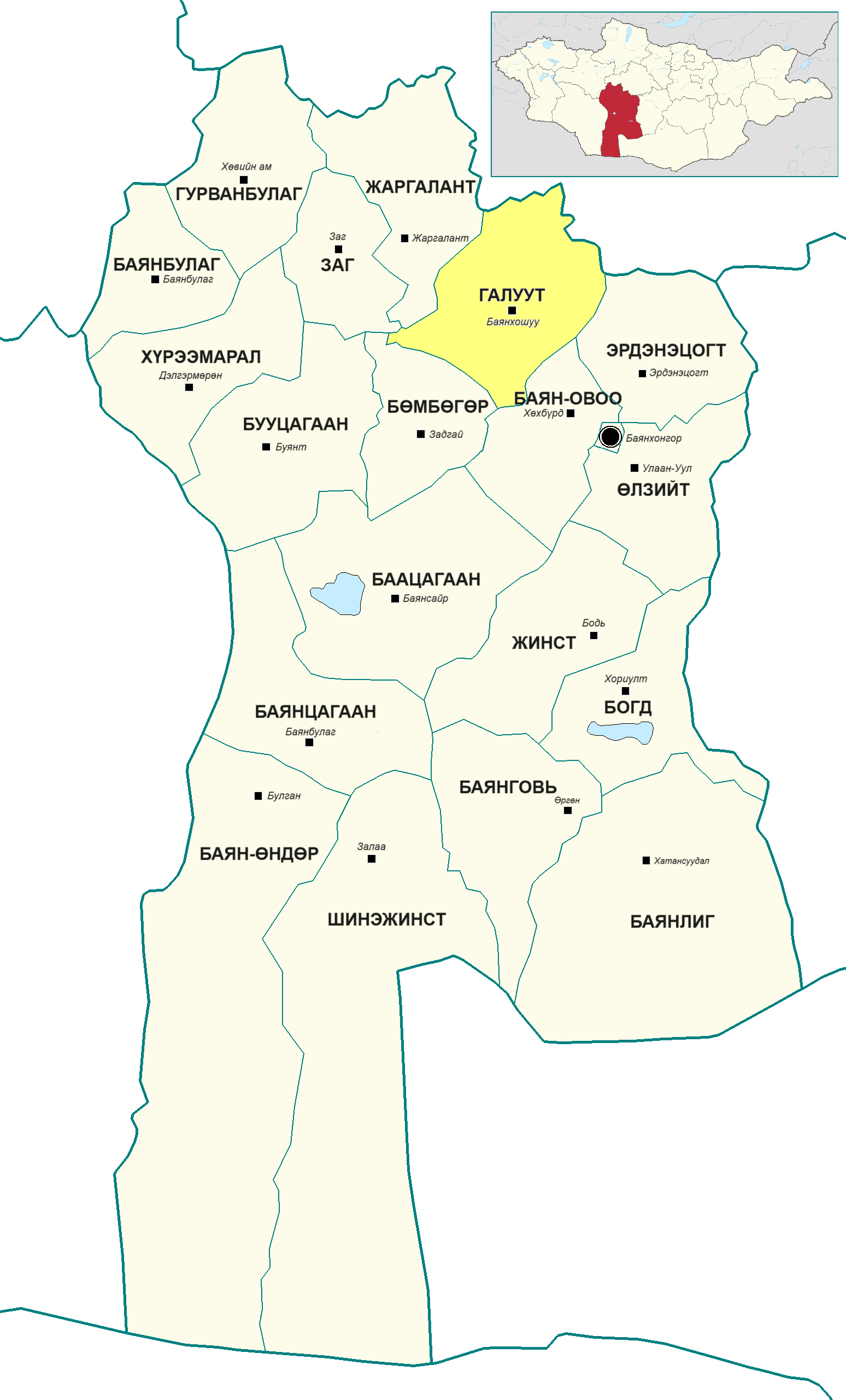

- Location within Mongolia
- Coordinates: 46°42′06″N 100°8′42″E
- Country: Mongolia
- Province: Bayankhongor Province

Area
  - Total: 5,047 km^{2} (1,949 sq mi)
- Time zone: UTC+8 (UTC + 8)

Galuut (Mongolian: Галуут) is a sum (district) of Bayankhongor Province in southern Mongolia. In 2006, its population was 4,012.

== Climate ==
Galuut has a subarctic climate (Köppen climate classification Dwc) with mild summers and severely cold winters. The average minimum temperature in January is −31.3 °C (−24.3 °F), and temperatures as low as −48 °C (−54 °F) have been recorded. Most precipitation falls in the summer as rain, with some snow in the adjacent months of May and September. Winters are very dry.

Climate data for Galuut, elevation 2,126 m (6,975 ft), (1991–2020 normals, extremes 1961–1990, 1999–2023)
Month	Jan	Feb	Mar	Apr	May	Jun	Jul	Aug	Sep	Oct	Nov	Dec	Year
Record high °C (°F)	−1.5 (29.3)	8.0 (46.4)	12.9 (55.2)	25.2 (77.4)	26.8 (80.2)	31.0 (87.8)	32.2 (90.0)	31.7 (89.1)	25.2 (77.4)	21.0 (69.8)	10.6 (51.1)	3.3 (37.9)	32.2 (90.0)
Mean daily maximum °C (°F)	−18.1 (−0.6)	−12.7 (9.1)	−1.0 (30.2)	8.4 (47.1)	14.6 (58.3)	20.4 (68.7)	22.2 (72.0)	20.4 (68.7)	14.4 (57.9)	5.6 (42.1)	−5.8 (21.6)	−15.6 (3.9)	4.4 (39.9)
Daily mean °C (°F)	−25.4 (−13.7)	−21.2 (−6.2)	−10.5 (13.1)	0.9 (33.6)	7.5 (45.5)	13.3 (55.9)	15.7 (60.3)	13.5 (56.3)	6.6 (43.9)	−2.7 (27.1)	−13.8 (7.2)	−22.7 (−8.9)	−3.2 (26.2)
Mean daily minimum °C (°F)	−31.3 (−24.3)	−28.4 (−19.1)	−18.7 (−1.7)	−6.7 (19.9)	−1.0 (30.2)	5.8 (42.4)	8.9 (48.0)	6.4 (43.5)	−0.6 (30.9)	−9.8 (14.4)	−19.9 (−3.8)	−28.3 (−18.9)	−10.3 (13.5)
Record low °C (°F)	−46 (−51)	−48.0 (−54.4)	−38.5 (−37.3)	−28.1 (−18.6)	−16.1 (3.0)	−7.1 (19.2)	−2.7 (27.1)	−8.0 (17.6)	−17.8 (0.0)	−31.7 (−25.1)	−38.7 (−37.7)	−44.1 (−47.4)	−48.0 (−54.4)
Average precipitation mm (inches)	2.3 (0.09)	2.2 (0.09)	3.6 (0.14)	7.5 (0.30)	22.6 (0.89)	40.8 (1.61)	56.5 (2.22)	47.2 (1.86)	17.1 (0.67)	5.2 (0.20)	2.9 (0.11)	2.8 (0.11)	210.7 (8.29)
Average precipitation days (≥ 1.0 mm)	1.0	0.7	1.1	1.9	3.0	6.2	8.7	7.0	3.0	1.7	1.0	0.9	36.2
Source 1: NOAA (1961-1990)
Source 2: Starlings Roost Weather

== Administrative divisions ==
The district is divided into six bags, which are:

- Bayankhoshuu
- Bayannuur
- Khairkhan
- Mandal
- Sumber
- Unegt

== Notable natives ==
- Batzorig Vaanchig, a traditional Mongolian musician in the band Khusugtun, as well as a YouTuber
