= Bayan-Öndör, Bayankhongor =

District in Bayankhongor Province, Mongolia

Bayan-Öndör District Баян-Өндөр сум ᠪᠠᠶ᠋ᠠᠨᠥᠨᠳᠦᠷᠰᠤᠮᠤ
- District
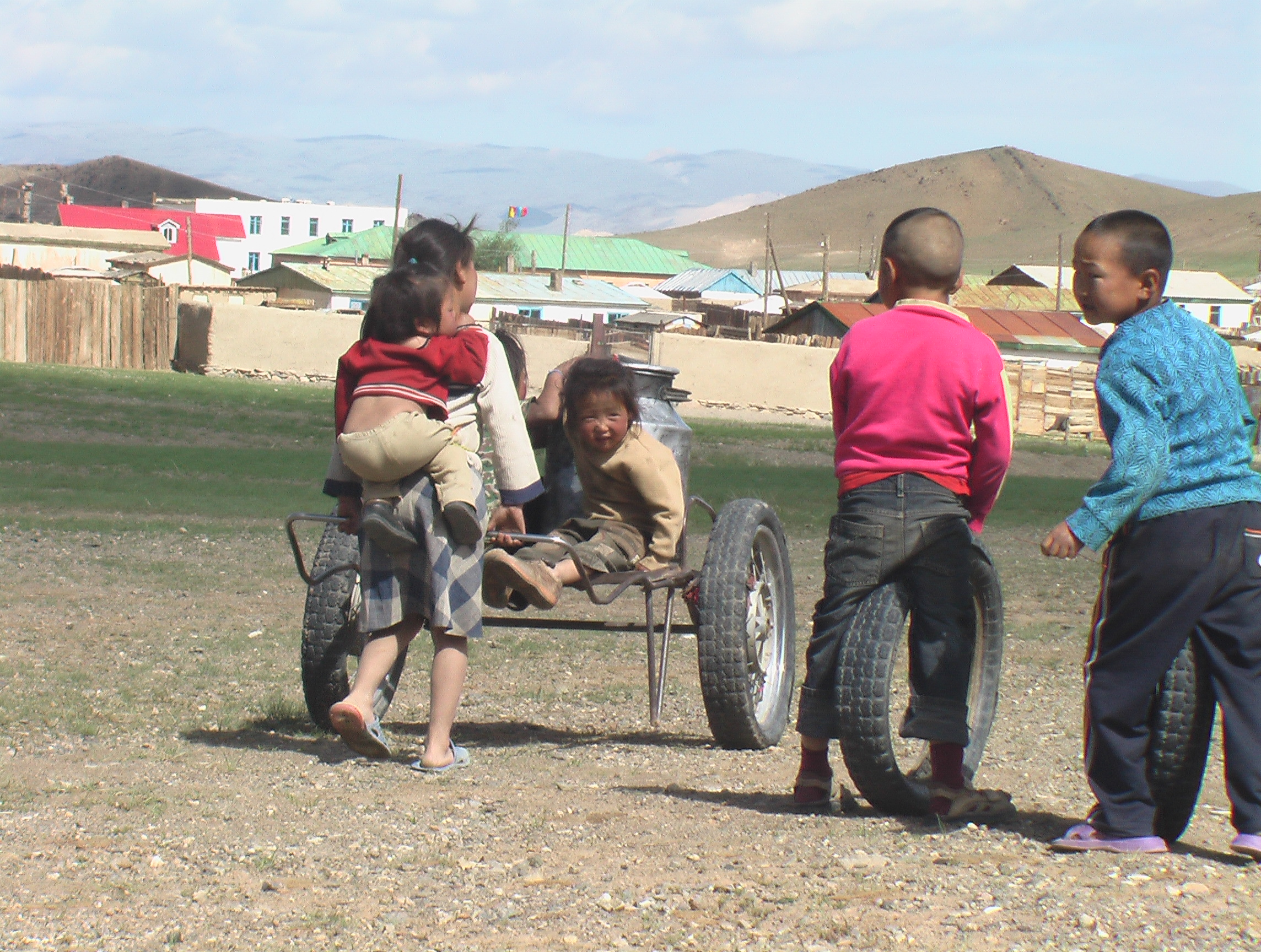

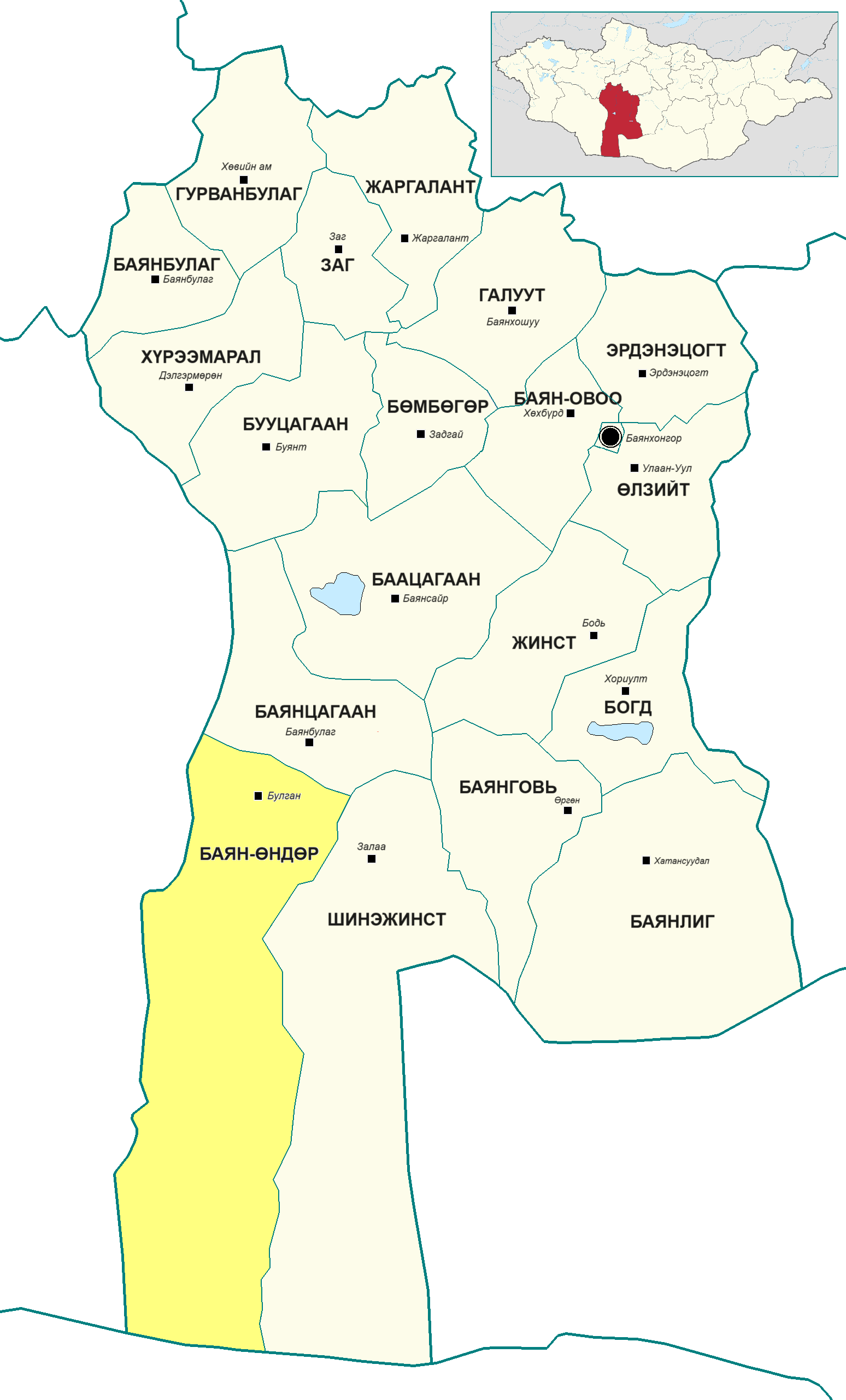
- Bayan-Öndör District in Bayankhongor Province

- Location in Mongolia
- Coordinates: 44°48′03″N 98°39′25″E
- Country: Mongolia
- Province: Bayankhongor
- Time zone: UTC+8

Bayan-Öndör (Mongolian: Баян-Өндөр, Rich-High) is a sum (district) of Bayankhongor Province in southern Mongolia. In 2006, its population was 2,559. Bayan-Öndör joined the UNESCO Global Network of Learning Cities in 2025.

== Administrative divisions ==
The district is divided into four bags, which are:

- Bulgan
- Elgen
- Idren
- Ulaan Uzuur
