= Zag, Mongolia =

District in Bayankhongor Province, Mongolia

Coordinates: 46°56′34″N 99°09′57″E

Zag District Заг сум ᠵᠠᠭᠰᠤᠮᠤ
- District
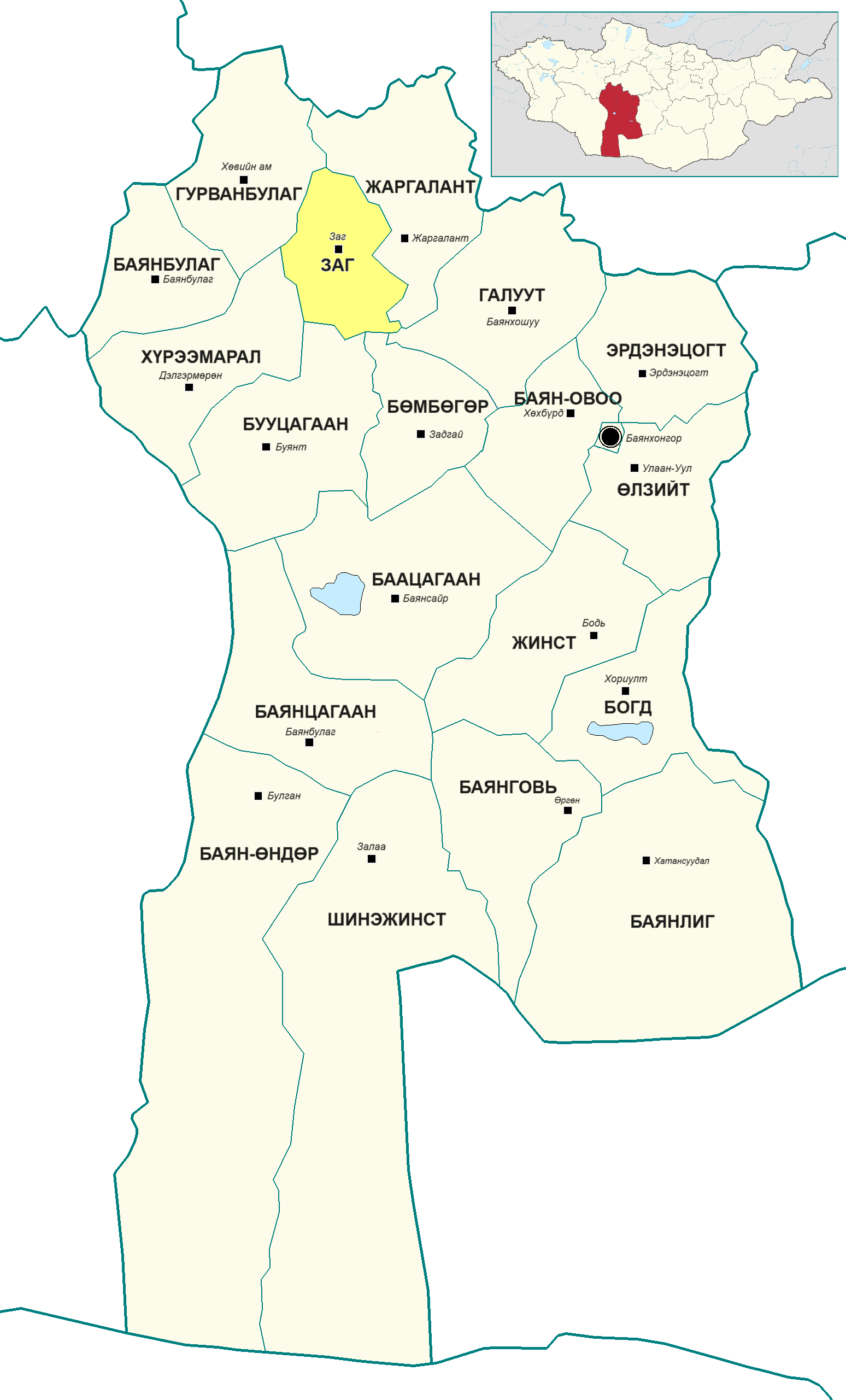
- Country: Mongolia
- Province: Bayankhongor Province

Area
  - Total: 2,561 km^{2} (989 sq mi)
- Time zone: UTC+8 (UTC + 8)

Zag (Mongolian: Заг, saxaul) is a sum (district) of Bayankhongor Province in southern Mongolia. In 2006, its population was 2,264.

== Administrative divisions ==
The district consists of four bags which are:

- Bayanbulag
- Bayanulaan
- Chandmani-Ovoo
- Zalaa-Ovoo
