= Gurvanbulag, Bayankhongor =

District in Bayankhongor Province, Mongolia

Coordinates: 47°13′41″N 98°34′16″E

Gurvanbulag District Гурванбулаг сум ᠭᠤᠷᠪᠠᠨᠪᠤᠯᠠᠭᠰᠤᠮᠤ
- District
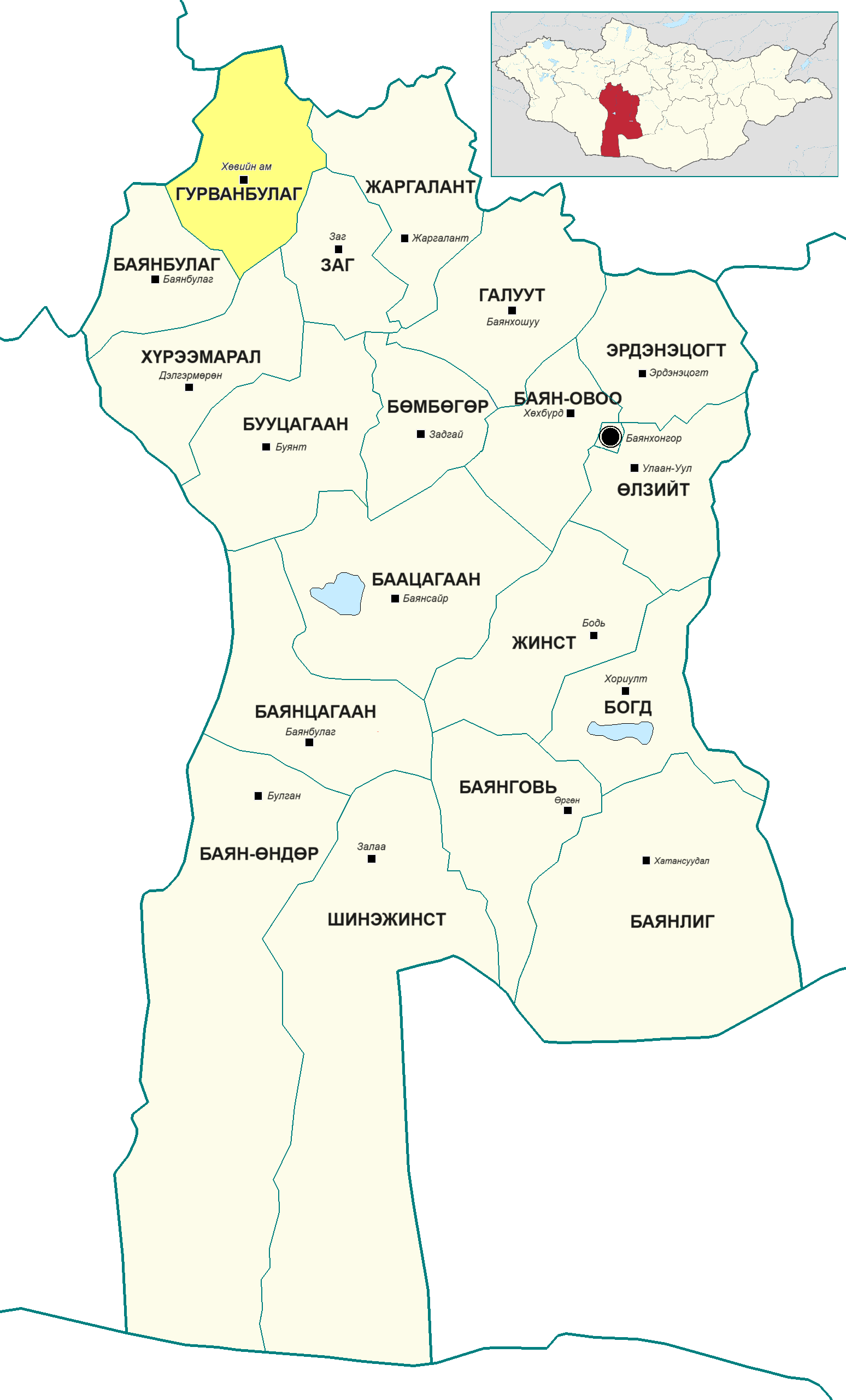
- Country: Mongolia
- Province: Bayankhongor Province

Area
  - Total: 4,442 km^{2} (1,715 sq mi)
- Time zone: UTC+8 (UTC + 8)

Gurvanbulag (Mongolian: Гурванбулаг, Three Springs) is a sum (district) of Bayankhongor Province in southern Mongolia. In 2006, its population was 2,594.

== Geography ==
The district has a total area of 4,442 km^{2}.

== Administrative divisions ==
The district is divided into five bags, which are:

- Buga
- Davaanii Am
- Khuviin Am
- Pionyer Tolgoi
- Tsengel
