= Bayankhongor Province =

Province (aimag) of Mongolia

Bayankhongor Province Баянхонгор аймаг ᠪᠠᠶᠠᠨᠬᠣᠩᠭᠣᠷᠠᠢᠮᠠᠭ
- Province
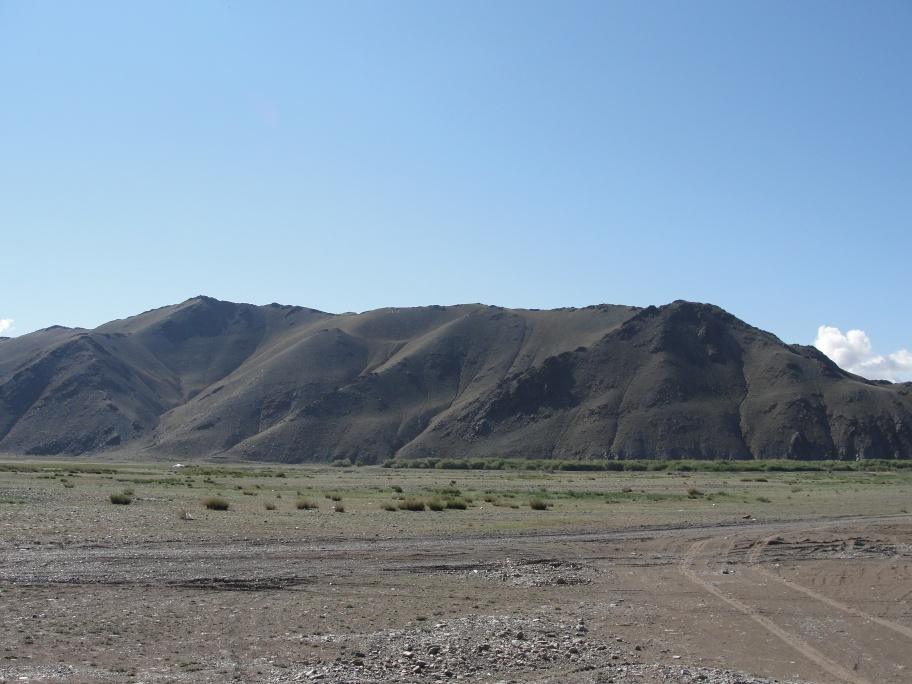
- Nomgon from the west

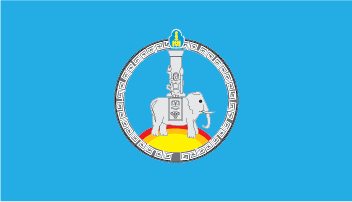
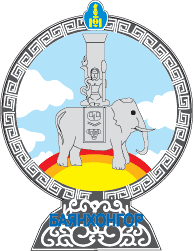
- Flag Seal

- Coordinates: 46°06′N 100°41′E
- Country: Mongolia
- Established: 1941
- Capital: Bayankhongor

Area
  - Total: 115,977.80 km^{2} (44,779.28 sq mi)

Population (2025)
  - Total: 87,974
  - Density: 0.75854/km^{2} (1.9646/sq mi)

GDP
  - Total: ▲MNT 906.69 billion US$ 252.2 million (2025)
  - Per capita: ▲MNT 10.27 million US$ 2,856 (2025)
- Time zone: UTC+8
- Area code: +976 (0)144
- ISO 3166 code: MN-069
- Vehicle registration: БХ_
- Website: www.bayankhongor.com/en

The Bayankhongor Province or Bayanhongor Aimag (Note: Mongolian: Баянхонгор аймаг, romanized: Bayanhongor aimag, pronounced [ˌpajə̆ɴˈχɔɴɢɞr ˈæˑməq], lit. "Rich Darling Province") is one of the 21 aimags (provinces) of Mongolia. It is located in the southwest of the country and, at 116,000 square kilometers, it is one of the largest aimags. The capital of the aimag shares the provincial name, Bayankhongor.

== History ==
Bayankhongor aimag was formed in 1941 with the establishment of the Bayankhongor Citizen's Assembly. There were originally 16 Bayankhongor Area Soums and about 41,000 people in the aimag. The aimag was originally named Govi-Bumbugur; however, it was soon changed to Bayankhongor.

In April 1976, Bayankhongor was awarded the Outstanding Red Award for livestock, meat, and wool production. The aimag received substantial investment from the former USSR, including infrastructure and education. However, the USSR also systematically repressed the religion and cultural heritage of the aimag, purging famous monasteries such as the Geegin Monastery and killing thousands of monks.

The zud, winter snow disasters, of the early 2000s devastated Bayankhongor's livestock and economy. The zud also precipitated social changes in the aimag since fewer people now rely on herding as a major source of income and more people have moved to the aimag capital in search of work. Out of the total aimag population estimated at 80,000, somewhere between 25 and 35,000 people live in the provincial capital.

== Geography ==
The Bayankhongor aimag includes very diverse geographic areas. It is typically divided into three areas. They include the mountainous and wooded Khangai in the north, the central steppe region, and the arid Gobi Desert in the south.

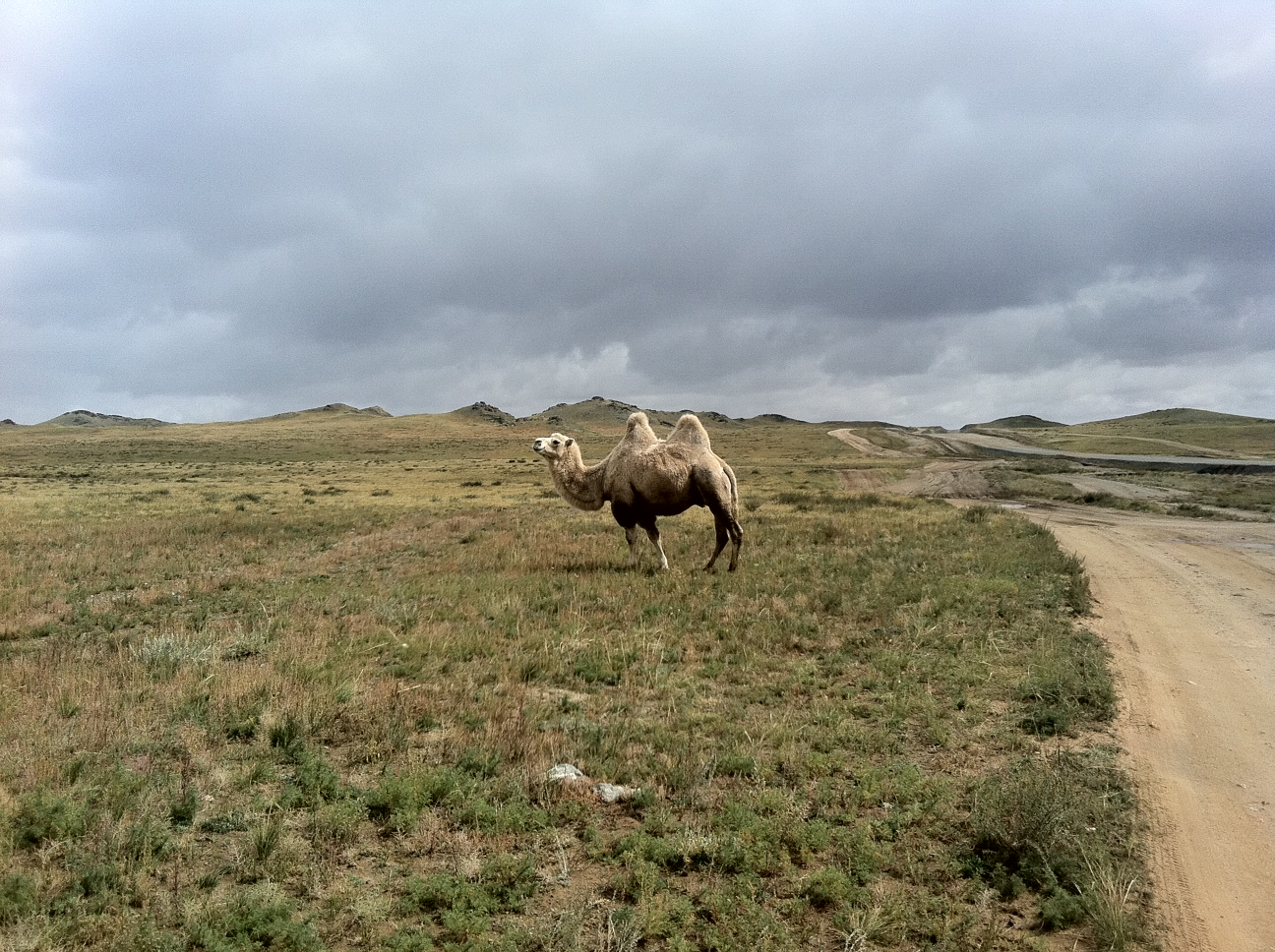
Albino camel in the Bayankhongor Province landscape.

Bayankhongor contains two mountain ranges, the Khangai Mountains in the north and the Gobi Altai Mountains in the central region. Ikh Bogd, the aimag's tallest mountain at 3957 meters, is part of the Gobi Altai range and is located outside of Bogd sum.

The largest lakes in Bayankhongor are Orog Nuur and Böön Tsagaan Nuur, which are found in the central semi-desert region of the aimag (the Valley of Lakes between the Khangai and Gobi Altai ranges), as are several other lakes. Due to the surrounding mountain areas, the lakes in the Valley of Lakes have no outlet and are therefore saline.

Khangai, in the north, contains several hot and cold mineral springs. Shargaljuut, a town about 54 km north of the aimag capital, boasts over 300 springs and has developed a popular resort to take advantage of this natural feature. The mineral waters of the various springs are used by the local people to treat a variety of ailments. Furthermore, there are a handful of genuine oases in the south of the province, most of which are in the Shinejinst area. The most famous oasis, Ekhiin-Gol, was once home to the Lama Dambijant or Ja Lama, an early 20th-century revolutionary turned bandit.

== Wildlife ==
Bayankhongor aimag boasts a diverse wildlife population, although, unfortunately, many species are endangered. Despite protected areas in the aimag, the populations of animals such as the snow leopard, long-eared jerboa, Mongolian wild ass, and wild Bactrian camels are rapidly diminishing. The Gobi bear population is estimated at less than 50 animals. On the other hand, Bayankhongor residents have been heard to say that the aimag has the most marmots out of any aimag. The middle salt lake depression plane, particularly areas like Boon Tsaagan Nuur and Orog Nuur are excellent birding areas with endangered birds such as the Dalmatian pelican and relict gull. Both these lakes are protected through the World Ramsar Convention for Wildlife Diversity. Domesticated animals in Bayakhongor include Bactrian camels, horses, sheep, goats, yaks, cattle, and a yak-cattle hybrid called a khainag.

== Attractions ==
The attractions of Bayankhongor vary from the natural (Gobi bear) to the man-made (Chess Stones of Erdentsogt); from the old (prehistoric petroglyphs in Bayan Lig) to the older (dinosaur bones in Bugiin Tsav). Since the aimag contains all three major geographic zones of Mongolia (forest, steppe, and desert) it is a great place to commune with nature.

=== Museums ===
There are two museums in the aimag capital, a History and Ethnographic Museum and a Museum of Natural History. The History and Ethnographic Museum contains exhibits of traditional nomadic life such as information on weddings, ger life, and traditional clothes. It also has some interesting artifacts from Bayankhongor during Manchu Rule, and religious exhibits including a pair of famous Green and White Tara statues, the Jadamba Sutras, and shaman robes. The Museum of Natural History contains various mineral specimens from the aimag such as marble and volcanic rock, as well as various mounted endemic animals. The highlights of the museum are the complete skeleton of a Tarbosaurus dinosaur and a 130-million-year-old fossil of a turtle discovered in the Bugiin Tsav (Bugiin Ravine) in the Gobi Desert.

=== Parks ===
The aimag capital has a few parks, namely the Dinosaur Park and the Children's Park. The Dinosaur Park consists of models of the many dinosaur species found in the south of the province. There is also a model ger open to visitors. The Children's Park, despite the name, is a nature park with scenic pathways and endemic trees and plants. The Tuil Gol (gol meaning river in Mongolian) running alongside the town makes for excellent picnic grounds, and Ikh Nomgun Mountain serves as a somewhat challenging day climb.

=== Monasteries ===
Although the famous monasteries of Bayankhongor were all destroyed during the Soviet purges, since Mongolia's independence in 1990, there has been a flurry of rebuilding and reconnecting with the area's Buddhist heritage.

There are two monasteries in the aimag capital, Bayankhongor. The entire town surrounds a sacred hill on which it is forbidden to build. Atop the hill sits a giant stupa of some significance, and there is a small monastery with about ten resident monks at the base of the hill. The other, larger, monastery is called Lamyn Gegeenii Gon Gandan Dedlin Khiid, and was built in 1991. The original monastery of this name was located about 30 km outside of the city and was home to over 10,000 monks and lamas making it one of the largest and most prominent monasteries in the county. However, the buildings were demolished and the monks killed or forced to renounce their vows by the Communist government in 1937. The current monastery is home to about 50 monks, and features a giant statue of Sakyamuni Buddha and two Green and White Tara statues modeled after those in the History and Ethnographical Museum of Bayankhongor.

Amarbuyant Khiid, located 50 km west of Shinejist, once housed the 13th Dalai Lama and over 1,000 monks. The 13th Dalai Lama stayed there for ten days in 1904 during a journey from Lhasa to Urga. While visiting, he built a small ovoo (rock cairn) which remains among the ruins of the monastery, which was destroyed along with Gegeen Monastery in 1937 during the Communist purges. The gradual restoration process of the complex began in the 1990s after the Communist regime fell.

=== Protected areas ===
There are two protected areas in Bayankhongor. The Gobi A: Strictly Protected Areas in the south borders China and Ömnögovi aimag. In it live many endangered species such as the Gobi bear and the Zam gecko. The second area is the Gobi Gurvansaikhan National Park, which is known for its extensive fossil sites, iconic sand dunes, ice canyon, and stunning mountain scenery not to mention the over 200 bird species and 600 varieties of plants. Both of these areas are popular tourist destinations both for foreigners and Mongolians.

=== Petroglyphs and fossils ===
Tsagaan Agui (White Cave) once housed Stone Age people beginning approximately 700,000 years ago. According to researchers, its crystal-lined inner chamber was a holy site for these inhabitants as well as a pilgrimage spot for historical period Buddhists.

The nearby site of Tsagaan Bulag (White Stream) was perhaps another sacred site for the region's ancient inhabitants. On a white outcrop, the faint drawings of figures are still visible. These figures, although anthropomorphic, bear unusual features such as massive ears and misshaped hands.

Bayangiin Nuruu (roughly translated as Rich Mountainside) is another site with well-preserved petroglyphs from approximately 3000BCE. Although not nearly as ancient as other sites, Bayangiin Nuruu's drawings are extensive and well-preserved, depicting scenes from daily life.

Dinosaur fossils are also found in the ravines and valleys of southeastern Bayankhongor. Famous sites include Bugiin Tsav, Yasnee Tsav, and Khermen Tsav.

== Transportation ==
The Bayankhongor Airport (BVN/ZMBH) has two runways, and is served by two or three weekly flights to and from Ulaanbaatar that vary from season to season. There are also daily buses to and from Ulaanbaatar (departing from the Dragon Center in Ulaanbaatar at 08.00) which stop in the town of Arvaikheer, as well as less regular buses west towards Gobi-Altai and Khovd aimags. Travel to soums (sub-provincial districts) is possible by mini-vans (microbuses) which gather in the open market in the southern district of the aimag capital.

== Administrative subdivisions ==
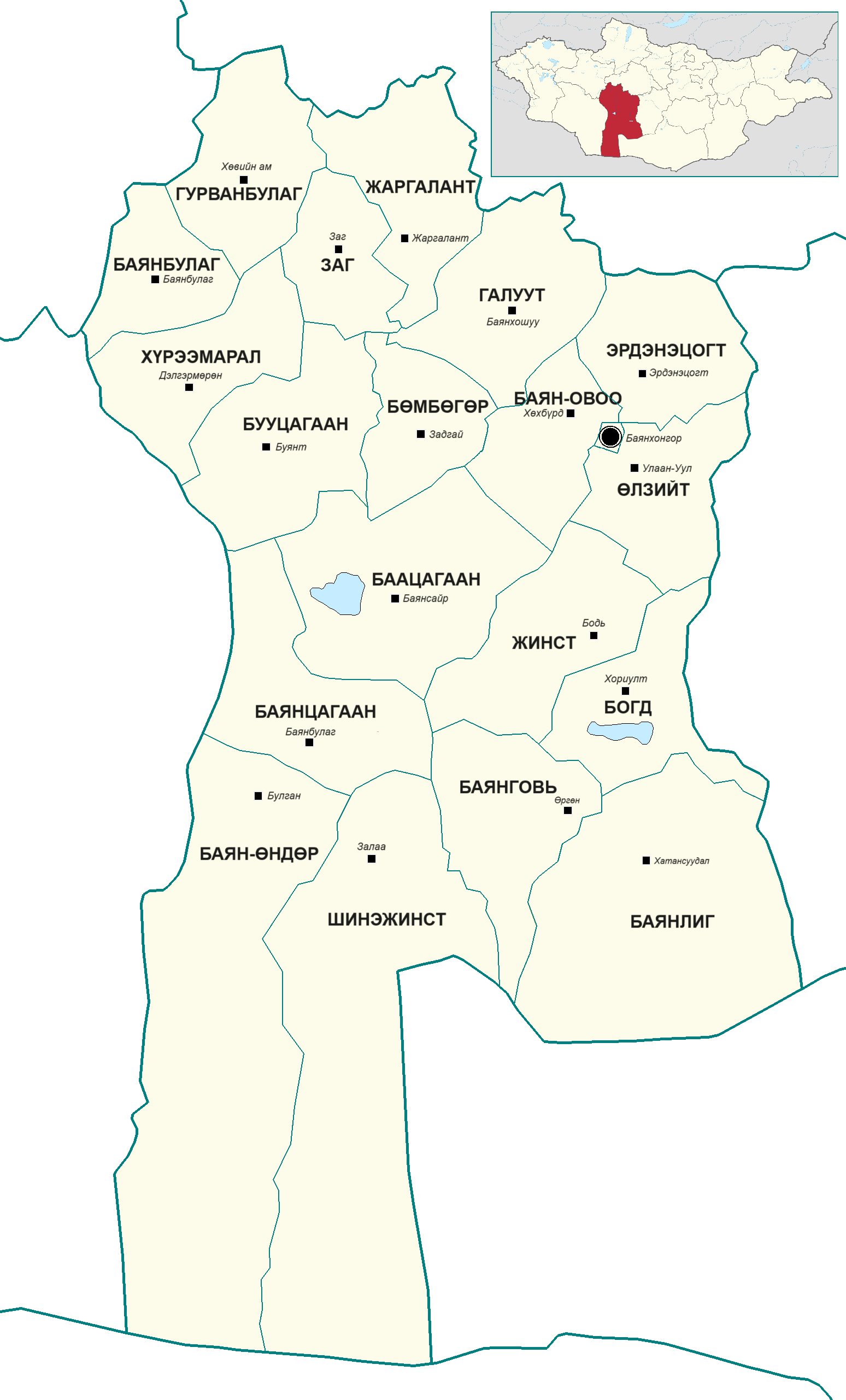
Sums of Bayankhongor

The sums of Bayankhongor aimag
Sum	Mongolian	Population (end of 2000)	Population (end of 2006)	Sum center population (end of 2006)	Area (km^{2})	Density (/km^{2})
Baatsagaan	Баацагаан	4,526	3,568	422	7,447	0.48
Bayan-Öndör	Баян-Өндөр	2,692	2,559	548	16,891	0.15
Bayan-Ovoo	Баян-Овоо	3,043	2,912	731	3,244	0.90
Bayanbulag	Баянбулаг	2,252	2,143	463	3,170	0.68
Bayangovi	Баянговь	2,903	2,703	628	4,662	0.58
Bayankhongor *	Баянхонгор	20,501	26,588	26,588	64	415.44
Bayanlig	Баянлиг	3,842	3,316	805	11,918	0.28
Bayantsagaan	Баянцагаан	3,946	3,599	634	5,395	0.67
Bogd	Богд	3,226	2,900	613	3,983	0.73
Bömbögör	Бөмбөгөр	2,755	2,584	656	3,044	0.85
Buutsagaan	Бууцагаан	4,258	3,452	901	5,840	0.59
Erdenetsogt	Эрдэнэцогт	5,158	4,235	933	4,100	1.03
Galuut	Галуут	5,275	4,012	644	5,047	0.79
Gurvanbulag	Гурванбулаг	2,915	2,594	350	4,442	0.58
Jargalant	Жаргалант	4,374	3,173	697	4,175	0.76
Jinst	Жинст	2,352	2,023	376	5,313	0.38
Khüreemaral	Хүрээмарал	2,466	2,064	325	4,328	0.48
Ölziit	Өлзийт	3,721	3,353	661	3,853	0.87
Shinejinst	Шинэжинст	2,469	2,187	319	16,501	0.13
Zag	Заг	2,440	2,264	592	2,561	0.88

^{*} - The aimag capital Bayankhongor

== Economy ==
In 2018, the province contributed to 1.30% of the total national GDP of Mongolia. The livestock industry is a prominent part of the province's economy. Bayankhongor Province has the largest amount of goats and the third largest amount of camels in the country. In the south, the mining sector is increasingly playing a major role in the economic life of the province. Mining in the Gobi Desert is considered one of the main ways through which the provincial government of Bayankhongor Province aims to eliminate its need for state subsidies by the year 2029.
