= Bömbögör, Bayankhongor =

District in Bayankhongor Province, Mongolia

Coordinates: 46°12′33″N 99°36′03″E

Bömbögör District Бөмбөгөр сум ᠪᠥᠮᠪᠦᠭᠡᠷᠰᠤᠮᠤ
- District
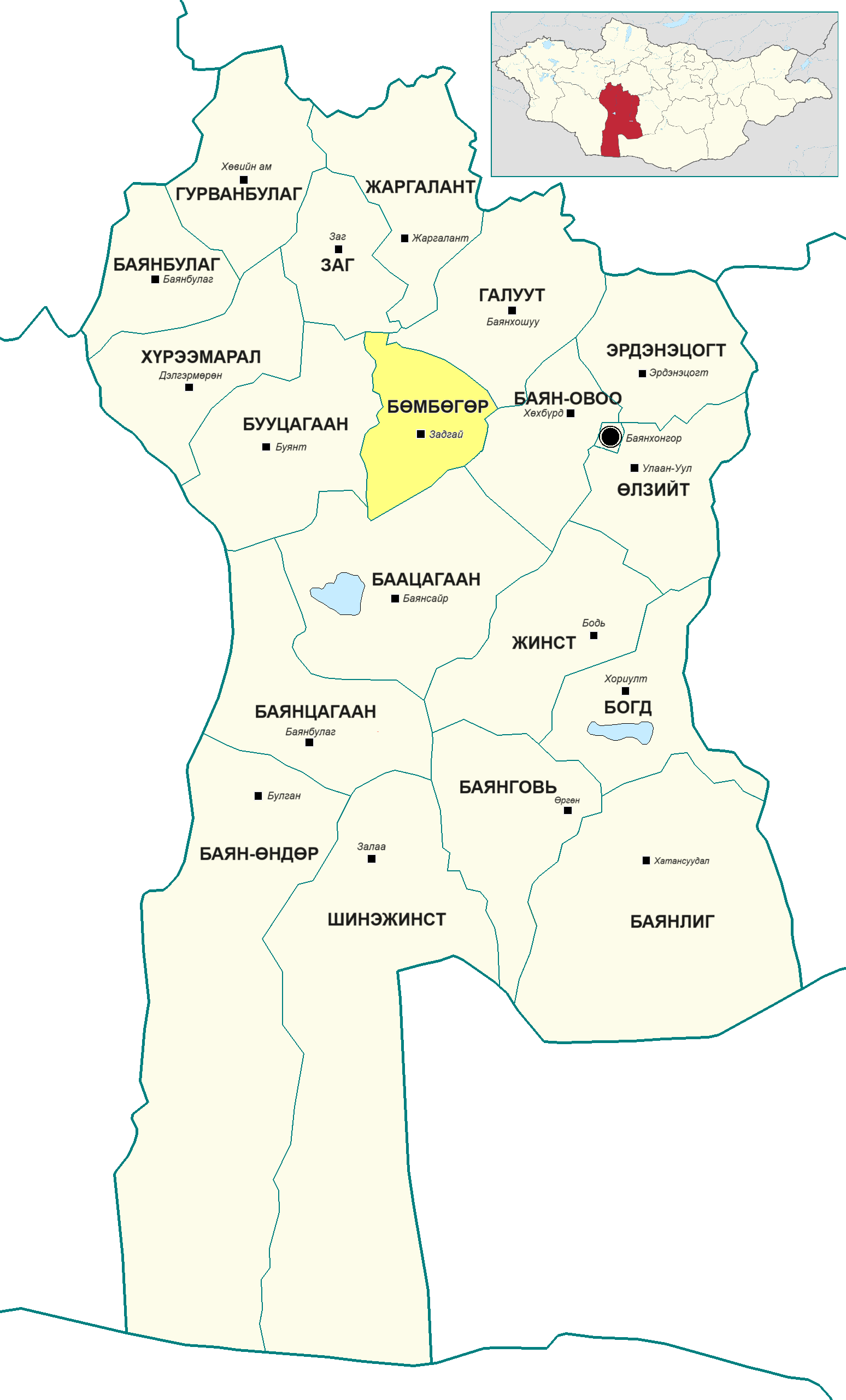
- Country: Mongolia
- Province: Bayankhongor Province

Area
  - Total: 3,044 km^{2} (1,175 sq mi)
- Time zone: UTC+8 (UTC + 8)

Bömbögör (Mongolian: Бөмбөгөр, Dome) is a sum (district) of Bayankhongor Province in southern Mongolia. In 2006, its population was 2,584.

== Administrative divisions ==
The district is divided into four bags, which are:

- Burgas
- Khukh Tolgoi
- Ulaan Sair
- Zadgai
