= Ölziit =

Ölziit (Mongolian: Өлзийт) is the name of several sums (districts) in different Mongolian aimags (provinces):

- Ölziit, Arkhangai
- Ölziit, Bayankhongor
- Ölziit, Dundgovi
- Ölziit, Övörkhangai
