= Övdög Khudag coal mine =

Coal mine in Dundgobi, Mongolia

Övdög Khudag Coal Mine
- Location within Mongolia
- Location: Bayanjargalan, Öndörshil, Dundgovi, Mongolia; 45°34′40″N 107°52′20″E
- Products: Lignite
- Company: TaliinShigtgee LLC

The Övdög Khudag Coal Mine (Mongolian: Өвдөг худаг, knee well, sometimes Ovdog Hudag) is a coal mine being developed in Bayanjargalan and Öndörshil Districts of Dundgovi Province, Mongolia. The deposit has coal reserves amounting to projected 89 million tonnes of Lignite. Together with the "Ikh ulaan uul" (Их улаан нуур, big red lake) deposit nearby it comprises the "Black Hills" development.

== Business ==
The mine is owned by TaliinShigtgee LLC.
