= Natsagiin Jantsannorov =

Mongolian composer (born 1949)

- Нацагийн Жанцанноров
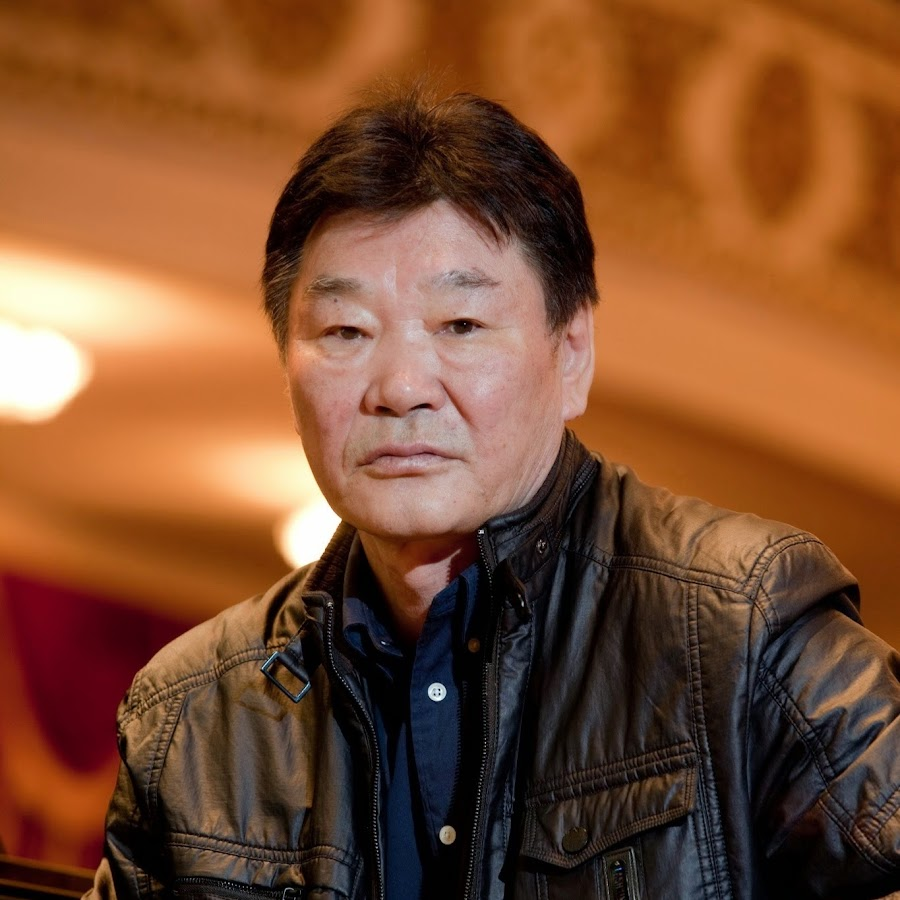
- Jantsannorov in 2010
- Born: 25 March 1949 (age 77); Ölziit, Övörkhangai, Mongolia
- Education: Petro Tchaikovsky Kyiv Conservatory (1979)
- Occupations: Composer, musicologist
- Height: 180 cm (5 ft 11 in)
- Children: 4

Natsagiin Jantsannorov (Mongolian: Нацагийн Жанцанноров; born on 25 March 1949) is a Mongolian composer and musicologist, known for his modern classical Mongolian works.

== Early life ==
Jantsannorov was born on 25 March 1949 in a place called "Khondloy" in Tsagaan Khotol, in the territory of Ölziit district, Övörkhangai province. He was born to an average herder family. Prior to the introduction of birth certificates in 1956, when registering Jantsannorov for school, his father, Natsag, recorded Jantsannorov's birth year as 1948, which included his gestational age. This circumstance led to Jantsannorov's birth year being registered as 1948 on his citizen ID.

=== Education ===
Between 1957 and 1961, he enrolled at the primary school of his home district, Ölziit. Later, he studied for six years at the secondary school in the neighboring Khujirt district, graduating in 1967. Between 1967 and 1971, after completing his secondary education, Jantsannorov studied at a teacher-training school in Ulaanbaatar, the capital of the Mongolian People's Republic, majoring in music teaching. He briefly worked as a music theory teacher at the latter school for two years until 1973. In 1974, he studied at the Petro Tchaikovsky Kyiv Conservatory in the Soviet Union and graduated as a composer and musicologist in 1979.

== Career ==
1971–1973: Music theory teacher at Teachers' Training School

1979–1981: Specialist in music creative affairs at the Ministry of Culture

1981–1985: Instructor responsible for arts and creative affairs at the Central Committee of the Mongolian People's Revolutionary Party (MPRP)

1983–1990: Deputy Minister of Culture and Chairman of the Mongolian Composers’ Union

1990: First Deputy Minister of Culture under the government of Sh. Gungaadorj

1992–1993: Elected Member of the State Great Khural (Parliament) from Övörkhangai province (resigned before term ended at own request)

1993–1995: Composer at the "Saltarino" Circus of the Federal Republic of Germany

1996–2000: Head of the Culture and Arts Policy Team and Deputy Director at the Ministry of Enlightenment

Since 1997: Expert on cultural and artistic affairs at the National Security Council of Mongolia

Since 1998: General Director of the "Ikh Urlag" (Great Art) Agency

Since 1999: Head of the Mongolian National Center for Intangible Cultural Heritage under UNESCO

Since 2000: Composer at the Mongolian Philharmonic

Since 2002: Chairman of the "Morin Khuur" (Horsehead Fiddle) Society and Chairman of the Mongolian Arts Council

Since 2002: President of the Mongolia-China Friendship Society

Since 2004: Member of the Ministerial Council of the Ministry of Education, Culture, Science and Sports, and Cultural Affairs Advisor

Since 2004: Member of the Mongolian National Commission for UNESCO

Since 2007: President of the Mongolian Ethnic Cultural and Scientific Foundation

Since 2008: Member of the Civil Council under the Minister of Defense

Since 2010: Leading Professor at the Mongolian State University of Arts and Culture (SUIS), Head of the Music Arts School Professors’ Team, and Chairman of the Academic Council

== Personal life ==
He is married with four children.

== Initiated/organized events ==
- 1982: First World Festival of Folk Art
- 1982: "Golden Autumn" Music Festival
- 1985: 7th Asian Music Symposium and Festival
- 1989: First Morin Khuur Festival
- 1991: First Long Song Competition of the Mongolian Ethnic Group
- 1997: Central Asian Epic International Symposium and Festival
- 2000: Mongolian Cultural Days held in the USA
- 2008: First International Morin Khuur Festival, Competition, and Symposium
- 2011: Morin Khuur Ensemble Concert at UNESCO Headquarters and United Nations Headquarters in New York City

== Works ==
=== Albums and DVDs ===
- "Burkhan Khaldun Orshoog" compositions for morin khuur
- Music for Mandukhai the Wise (1988)
- Music for Under the Eternal Sky (1992)
- "Protector of the Saint" compositions for morin khuur
- "Little Evening Songs" pieces for morin khuur, yatga, and vibraphone
- "Symphonetta" compositions for morin khuur ensemble
- "Often When I Lose My Mind" lyrical songs
- "I Want to Sing Lovingly" romantic pop songs
- "Resonance and Narration" morin khuur ensemble concert
- "Calmness" pictorial music
- "Blue Melodies of the East"
- "Gobi of Jade and Treasure"
- "Tale of the Steppe" 24 narrative songs

=== Sheet Music ===
- "Human Fate 1" collection of 40 songs, 2000
- "Human Fate 2" collection of 41 songs, 2000
- "Tale of the Steppe" 24 narrative songs, 2007

=== Selected Compositions ===
- Sonata for Violin and Piano, 1977
- String Quartet, 1978
- Symphony No. 1, 1979
- Joyful Overture, 1987
- "Three Faces of the State" symphonic picture, 1988
- "Epic of Toroi Bandi" opera ballet, 1988
- "Festival of Wishes" symphonic overture, 1990
- Sonata "Honest" for piano, 1996
- Sonata for Morin Khuur and Piano, 1998
- "Blessing of the Great Sky" symphonic orchestra and morin khuur ensemble overture, 2002
- "Wolf Descended on the Sage" national modern ballet, 2004
- Sonata for Morin Khuur and Piano, 2009

=== Concerts ===
- Morin Khuur Orchestra Concert, 1989
- Yatga Orchestra Concert No. 1, 1992
- Morin Khuur Orchestra Concert "Reflection," 1992
- "Honest" Orchestra Concert, 1992
- Piano Orchestra Concert, 1999
- Oratorio "Bright Field," 2002
- "Little Epic," Rhapsody for Yatga, 2007
- Morin Khuur, Cello, and Piano Trio, 2008
- Yochin Orchestra Concert No. 1, 2012
- "Blue Melodies of the East" collection, 2012
- Yatga Orchestra Concert No. 2, 2013
- "Golden Autumn" Music Concert, 2013
- Limbe (flute) Concert, 2013
- Morin Khuur Orchestra Concert No. 2 ("Kherlen Tiger's Epic"), 2012
- "Gobi of Jade and Treasure" collection, 2013
- About 30 works for morin khuur ensemble

=== Music for Drama ===
- "Back Office Workers," 1981
- "Rock of the Ravine," 1981
- "Feast Table's Backbone," 1981
- "Awakening," 1982
- "The Tale of Khukhöldei's Son," 1986
- "Tangle," 1989
- "Bet," 2000
- "Blue Moon," 2004

=== Film Music ===
- "Five Fingers," 1983
- "Garid Magnai," 1983
- "I Love You," 1985
- "Warm Autumn Days," 1985
- "Shadow," 1986
- "Mandukhai the Wise," 1988
- "Strange Person," 1989
- "Warm Breeze," 1990
- "Tears of the Stone Man," 1990
- "Bright Magnai," 1990
- "Life Trace," 1991
- "Under the Eternal Blue Sky," 1992
- "Idol," 1992
- "Flower Magnai," 1995
- "Descendant of the Great Khan," 1996
- "Protector of the Fierce Saint," 1998
- "Love That Cannot Part," 1998
- "The Last Queen of the Khan," 2000
- "Vansemberu," 2002
- "Edge of Sun and Moon," 2011
- "Bogd Khan," 2011
- "Striped Foal," 2013

=== Documentary Film Music ===
- "Victory Song," full-length documentary, 1984
- "Mother's Glory," 1981
- "Lords of the Taiga," 1983
- "Echoing Sound," 1987

=== Books ===
- "Twelve Portraits of Mongolian Music" Sonata Allegro, 1996
- Summary Glossary of Music Theory Terms, 1996
- "Awaken Your Wisdom..." Interview Collection, 2004
- "Talks of the Great Singer (J. Badraa's Name)" Conversations with Famous Singer J. Dorjdav, 2005
- "Theoretical Issues of the Five Tones of Mongolian Music" Research Work, 2006
- "Music and Era" Lectures and Articles, 2006
- Traditional Terminology of Long Song, 2006
- "The Sound of Mongolian Music – Theoretical Interpretation of Thought" Research Monograph, 2009
