= Erdenedalai, Dundgovi =

District in Dundgovi Province, Mongolia

Coordinates: 46°00′27″N 104°56′39″E

Erdenedalai District Эрдэнэдалай сум ᠡᠷᠳᠡᠨᠢᠳᠠᠯᠠᠢᠰᠤᠮᠤ
- District
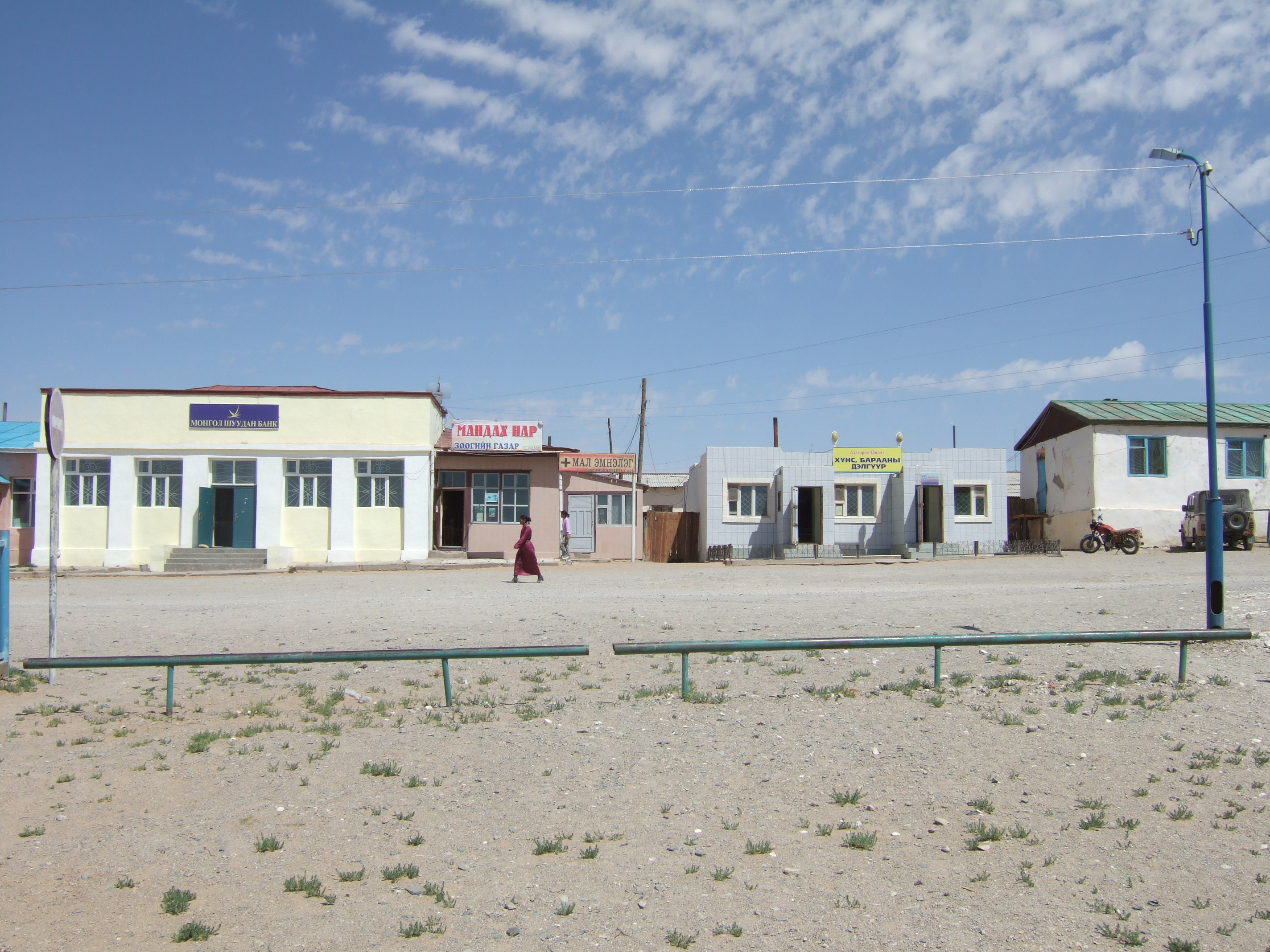
- The main street in Erdenedalai sum center

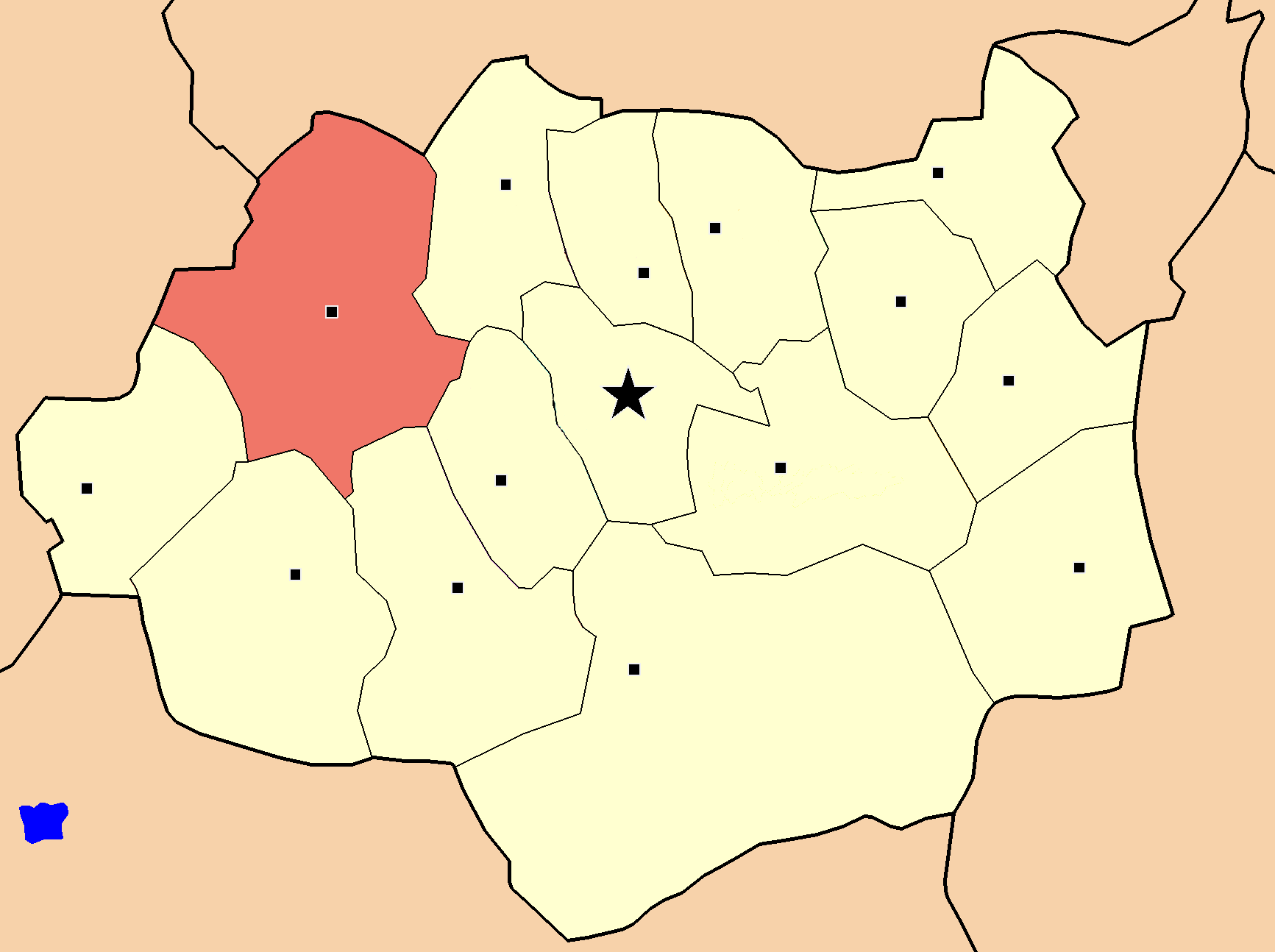
- Erdenedalai District in Dundgovi Province
- Country: Mongolia
- Province: Dundgovi Province

Area
  - Total: 7,351 km^{2} (2,838 sq mi)
- Time zone: UTC+8 (UTC + 8)

Erdenedalai (Mongolian: Эрдэнэдалай, Jewel ocean) is a sum (district) and town of Dundgovi Province in central Mongolia. Erdenedalai sum is the second most populous sum of Dundgovi Province after Saintsagaan (the latter including the aimag capital Mandalgovi).

Gimpil Darjaalan Khiid is a sightworthy monastery in the town of Erdenedalai, the administration center of the sum. The monastery was built at the end of the 18th century, and about 500 monks lived there. In 1937, it was one of the very few monasteries and temples which were not destroyed under the rule of Chorloogiin Choibalsan, but the monastery was closed and used as a store house thereafter. In 1990, it was reopened. The current Dalai Lama visited it in 1992.

There are several shops, a health clinic, kindergarten and a hotel in Erdenedalai. Two parks with a memorial were laid out opposite the administration building of the sum although it is very difficult to take care of trees and bushes in the dry climate.

== Administrative divisions ==
The district is divided into seven bags, which are:

- Rashaant
- Sangiin Dalai
- Sumiin Tuv
- Tengeleg
- Tsagaan-Ovoo
- Tsavchir
- Ungut
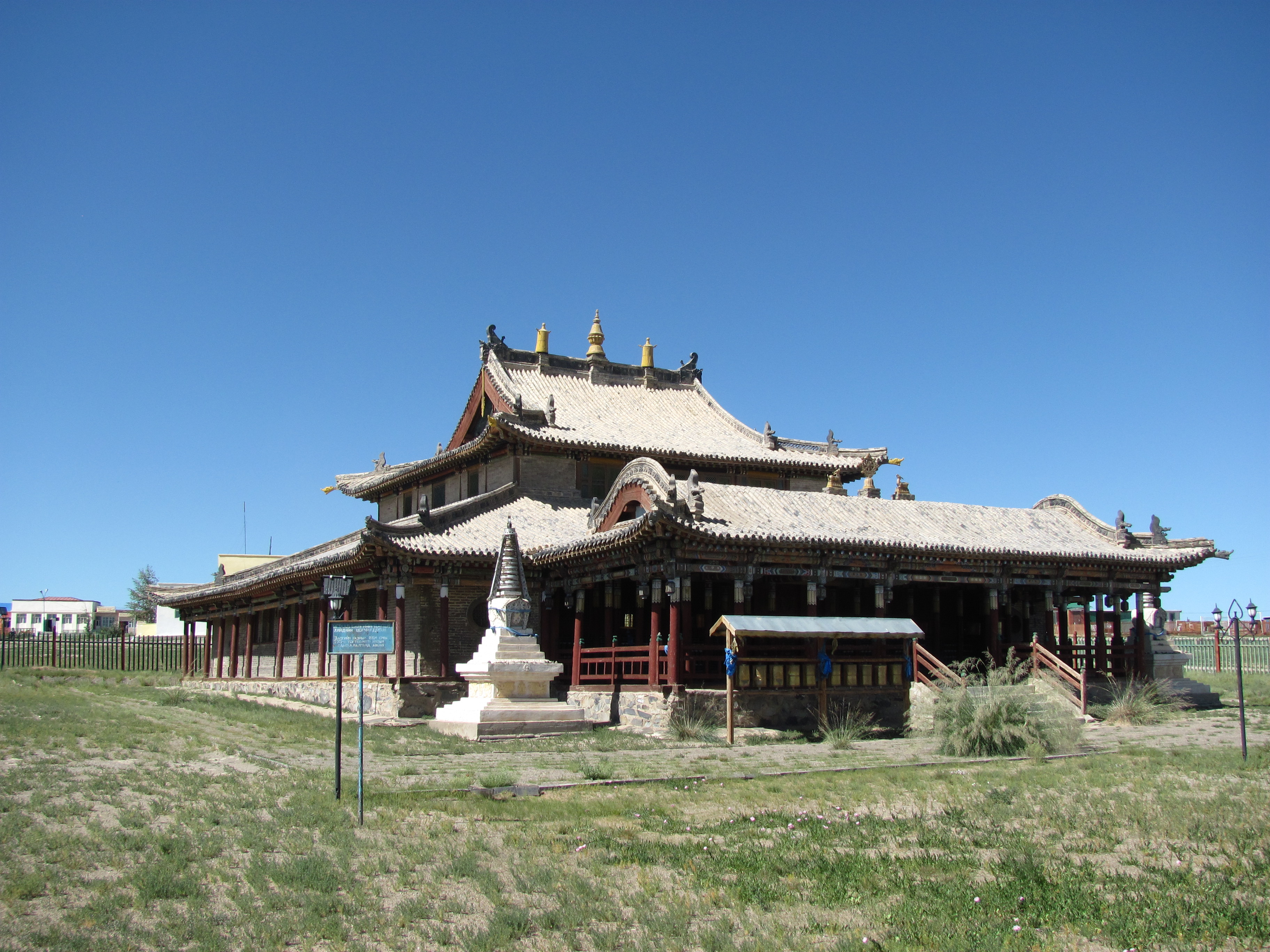
Gimpil Darjaalan Khiid Monastery.

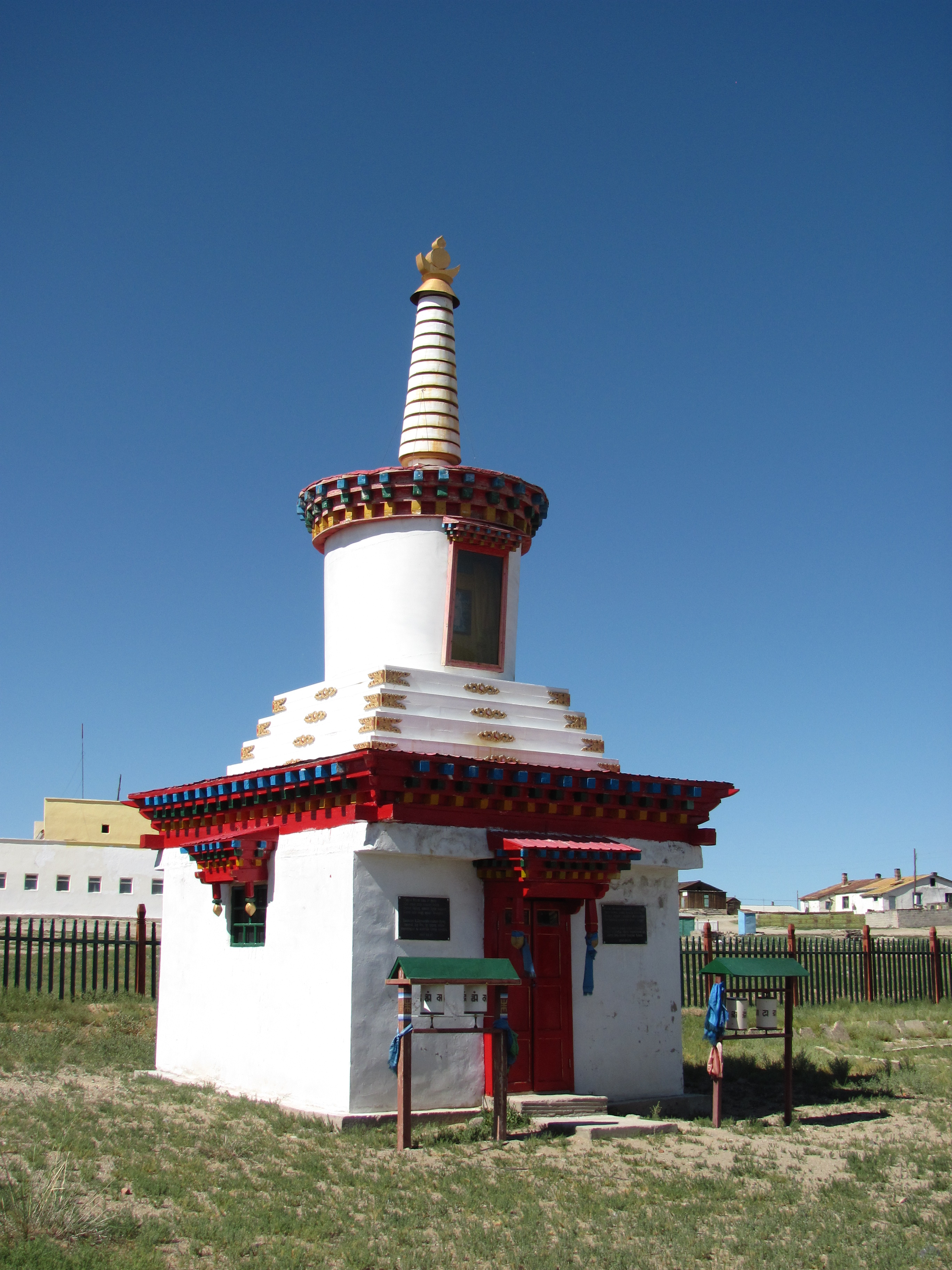
Stupa beside the monastery.

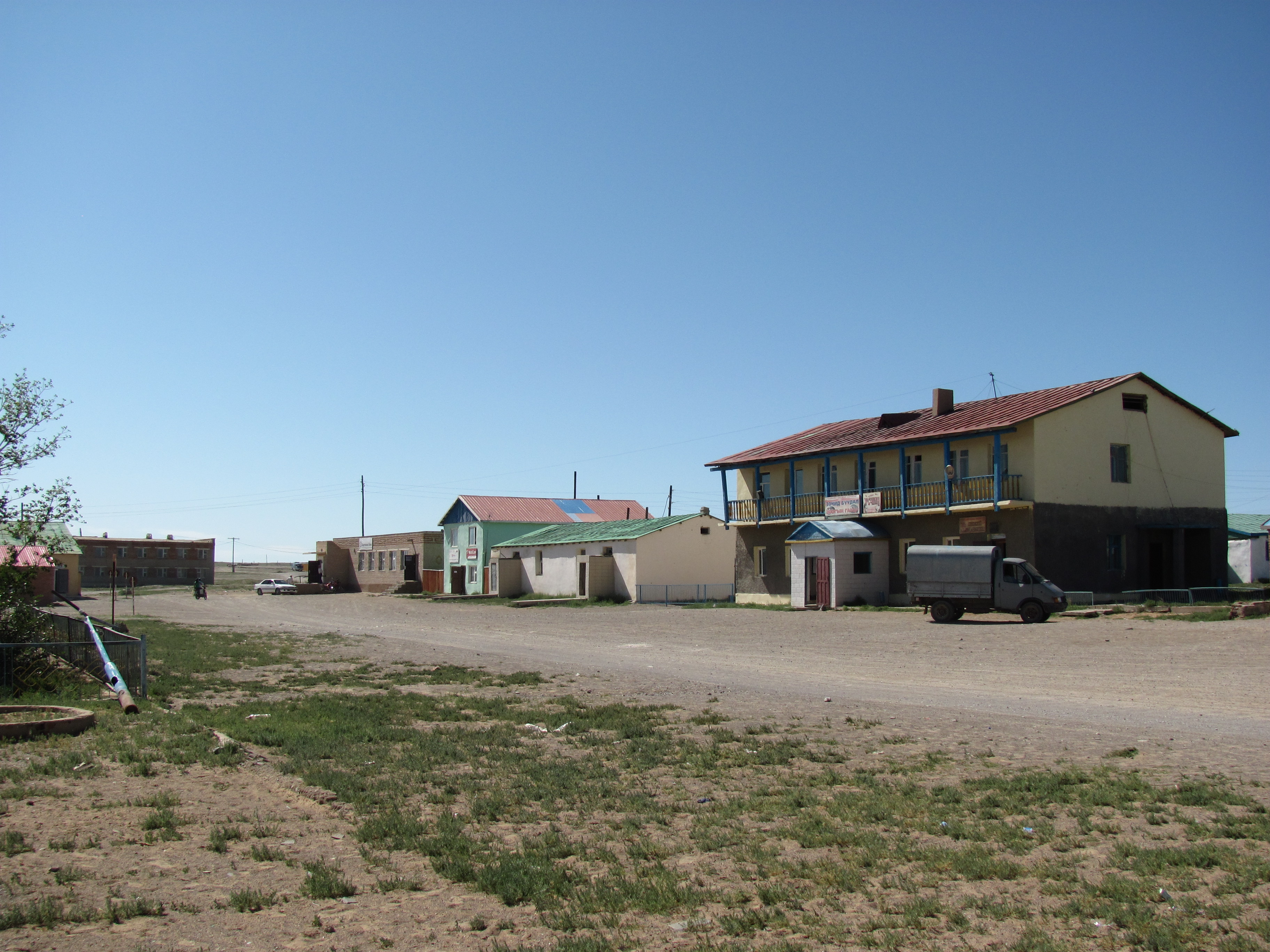
Main Street in Erdenedalai.

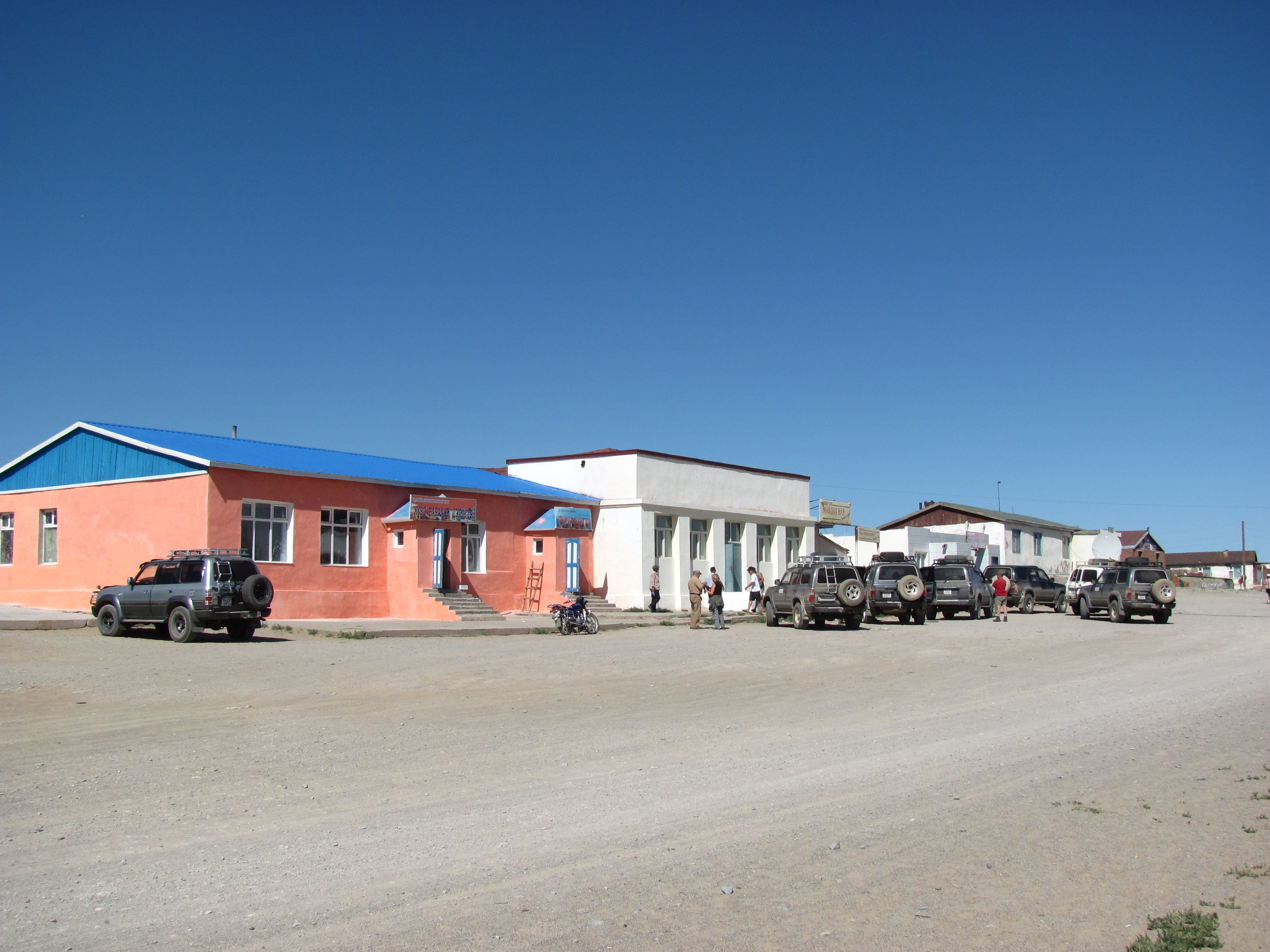
Main street in Erdenedalai.

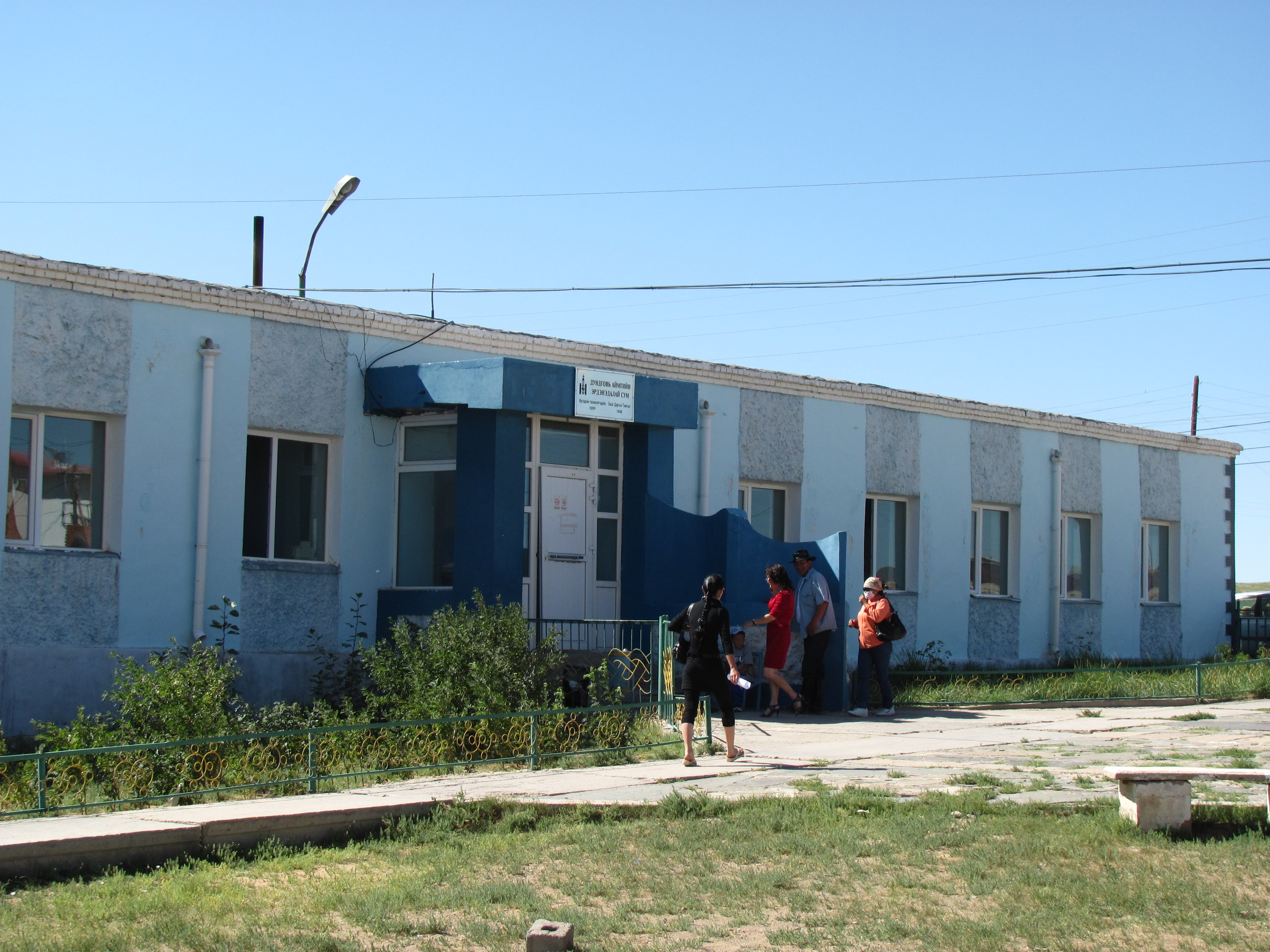
Sum Administration Building.

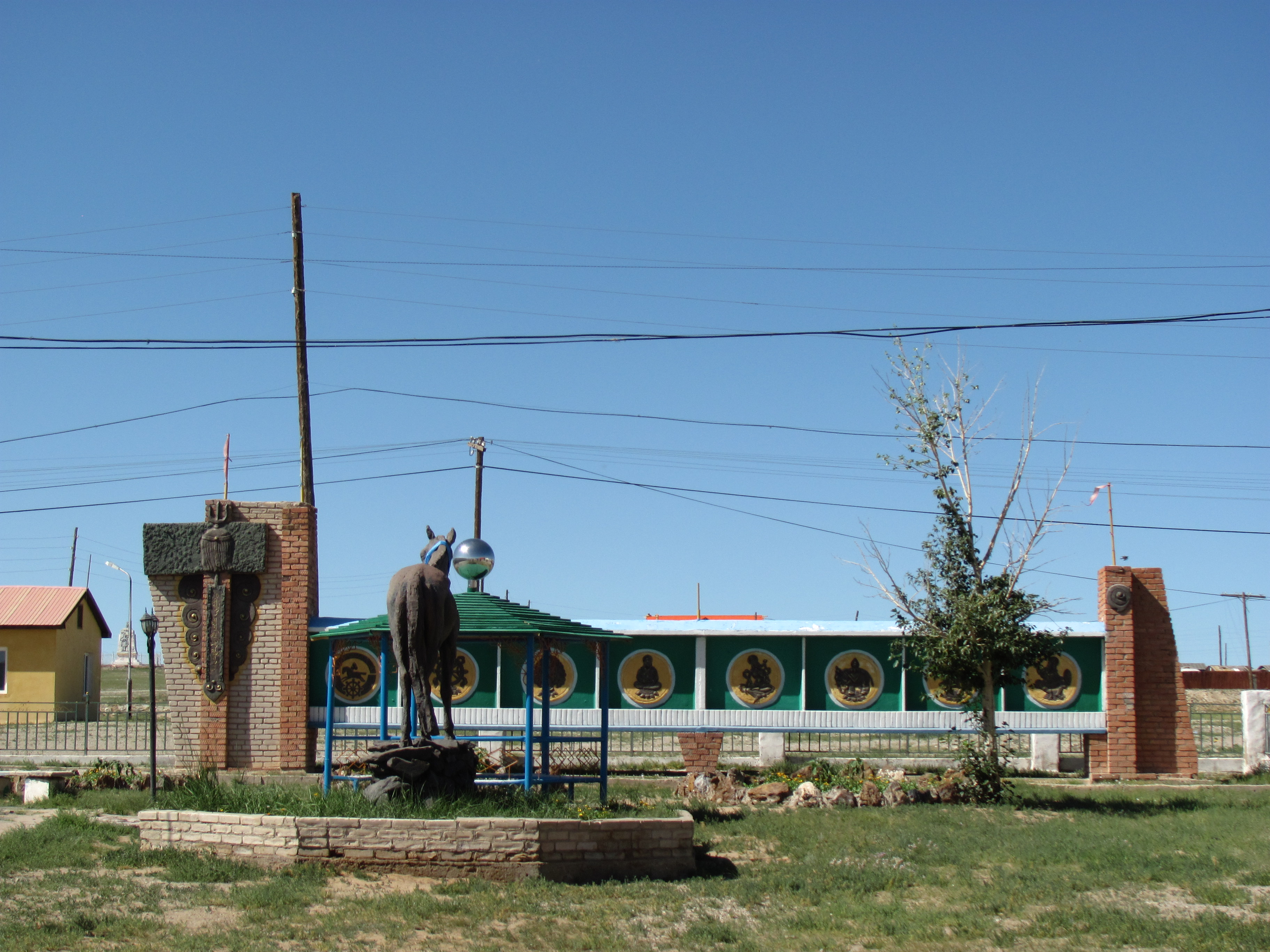
Memorial in Erdenedalai.

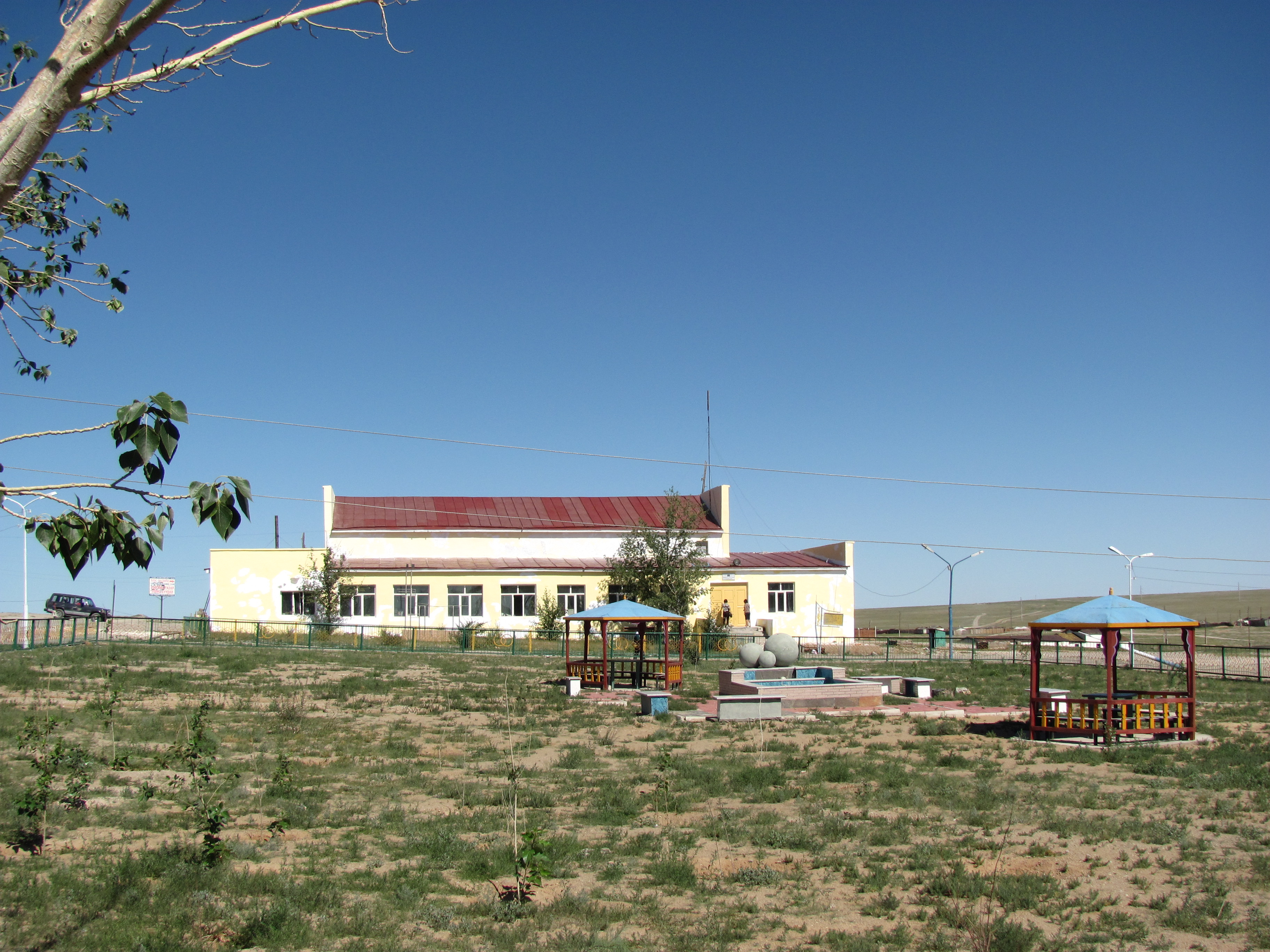
Park in Erdenedalai.
