= Mandalgovi–Ulaanbaatar Transmission Line =

Transmission line in Mongolia

Mandalgovi–Ulaanbaatar Transmission Line Мандалговь-Улаанбаатар Цахилгаан Дамжуулах Aгаарын Шугам

Location
- Country: Mongolia
- From: Mandalgovi
- To: Ulaanbaatar

Construction information
- Construction started: 21 June 2017
- Commissioned: 18 October 2019

Technical information
- Type: transmission line
- Current type: AC
- Total length: 250 km (160 mi)
- AC voltage: 330 kV
- No. of circuits: 2

The Mandalgovi–Ulaanbaatar Transmission Line (Mongolian: Мандалговь-Улаанбаатар Цахилгаан Дамжуулах Aгаарын Шугам) or Ulaanbaatar–Mandalgovi Transmission Line (Mongolian: Улаанбаатар-Мандалговь Цахилгаан Дамжуулах Aгаарын Шугам) is a transmission line in Mongolia connecting Mandalgovi of Dundgovi Province and Ulaanbaatar.

== History ==
The groundbreaking of the construction of the transmission line was held on 21 June 2017. The transmission line was commissioned and handed over on 18 October 2019. The ceremony was attended by Minister of Energy Ts. Davaasuren, China Ambassador to Mongolia Xing Haiming and Governor of Dundgovi Province O. Bat-Erdene.

== Technical specifications ==
The transmission line stretches for a length of 250 km and includes two substations along its path. It carries AC electricity over two circuits of 330 kV, Mongolia's highest voltage level for electricity transmission.

== Finance ==
The transmission line was constructed with US$5.95 million funding from the Government of Mongolia and US$113.04 million soft loan from Export–Import Bank of China.

== See also ==
- Electricity sector in Mongolia
