= Museum of Dundgovi Province =

Museum in Mandalgovi, Dundgovi, Mongolia

- Дундговь Аймгийн Музей
- Established: 1949
- Location: Mandalgovi, Dundgovil, Mongolia
- Coordinates: 45°46′04.7″N 106°16′24.5″E
- Type: museum
- Collection size: 4,500

The Museum of Dundgovi Province (Mongolian: Дундговь Аймгийн Музей) is a museum in Mandalgovi, Dundgovi Province, Mongolia.

== History ==
The museum was established in 1949.

== Exhibitions ==
The museum has a total of 4,500 exhibits, ranging from historical artifacts, ethnography, religious, wild life to natural resources.

== See also ==
- List of museums in Mongolia
