= Tsagaandelger, Dundgovi =

District in Dundgovi Province, Mongolia

Coordinates: 46°24′31″N 107°38′22″E

Tsagaandelger District Цагаандэлгэр сум ᠴᠭᠠᠨᠳᠡᠯᠭᠡᠷᠰᠤᠮᠤ
- District
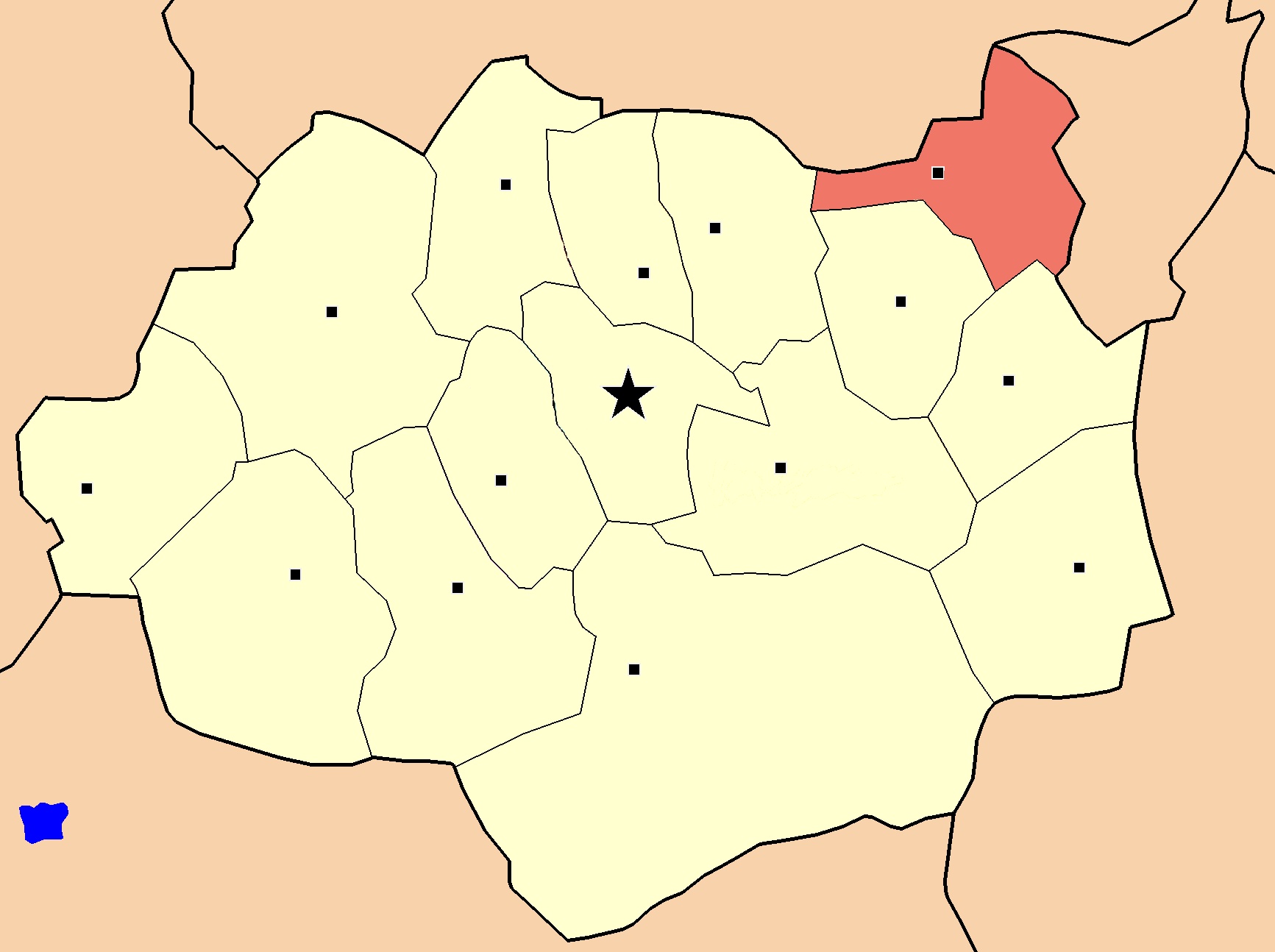
- Tsagaandelger District in Dundgovi Province
- Country: Mongolia
- Province: Dundgovi Province

Area
  - Total: 3,428 km^{2} (1,324 sq mi)
- Time zone: UTC+8 (UTC + 8)

Tsagaandelger (Mongolian: Цагаандэлгэр: white expanse) is a sum (district) of Dundgovi Province in central Mongolia. In 2007, its population was 1,319.

== Administrative divisions ==
The district is divided into four bags, which are:

- Delgerekh Zam
- Jargalant
- Kharaat
- Zamiin-Ulaan
