= Khuld, Dundgovi =

District in Dundgovi Province, Mongolia

Coordinates: 45°13′18″N 105°33′30″E

Khuld District Хулд сум ᠬᠤᠯᠤᠳᠰᠤᠮᠤ
- District
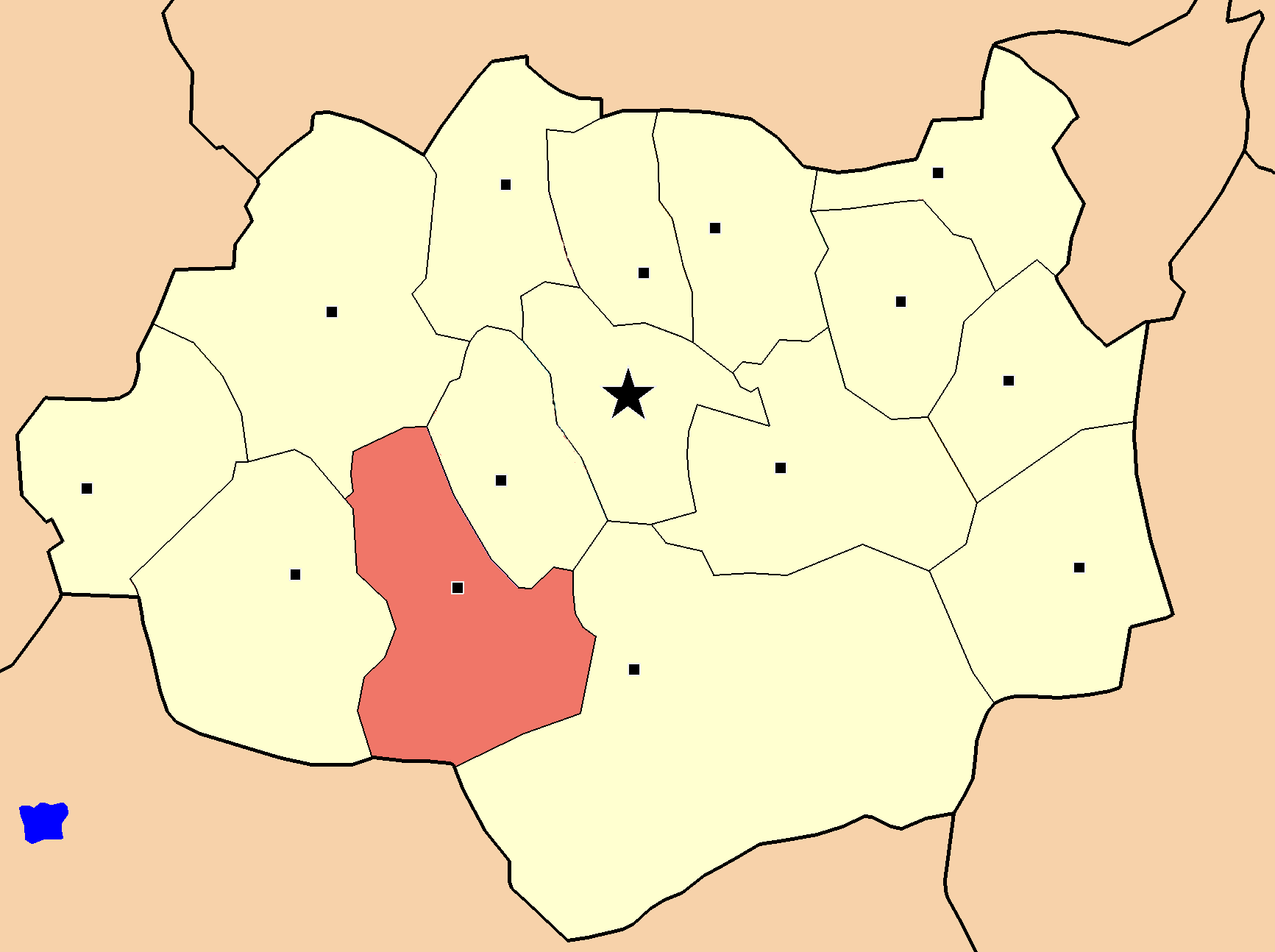
- Khuld District in Dundgovi Province
- Country: Mongolia
- Province: Dundgovi Province

Area
  - Total: 6,070 km^{2} (2,340 sq mi)
- Time zone: UTC+8 (UTC + 8)

Khuld (Mongolian: Хулд) is a sum (district) of Dundgovi Province in central Mongolia. In 2007, its population was 2,458.

== Administrative divisions ==
The district is divided into four bags, which are:

- Buleen
- Oldokh
- Shuvuutai
- Uul
