= Delgertsogt, Dundgovi =

District in Dundgovi Province, Mongolia

Coordinates: 46°07′35″N 106°22′27″E

Delgertsogt District Дэлгэрцогт сум ᠳᠡᠯᠭᠡᠷᠴᠣᠭᠲᠤᠰᠤᠮᠤ
- District
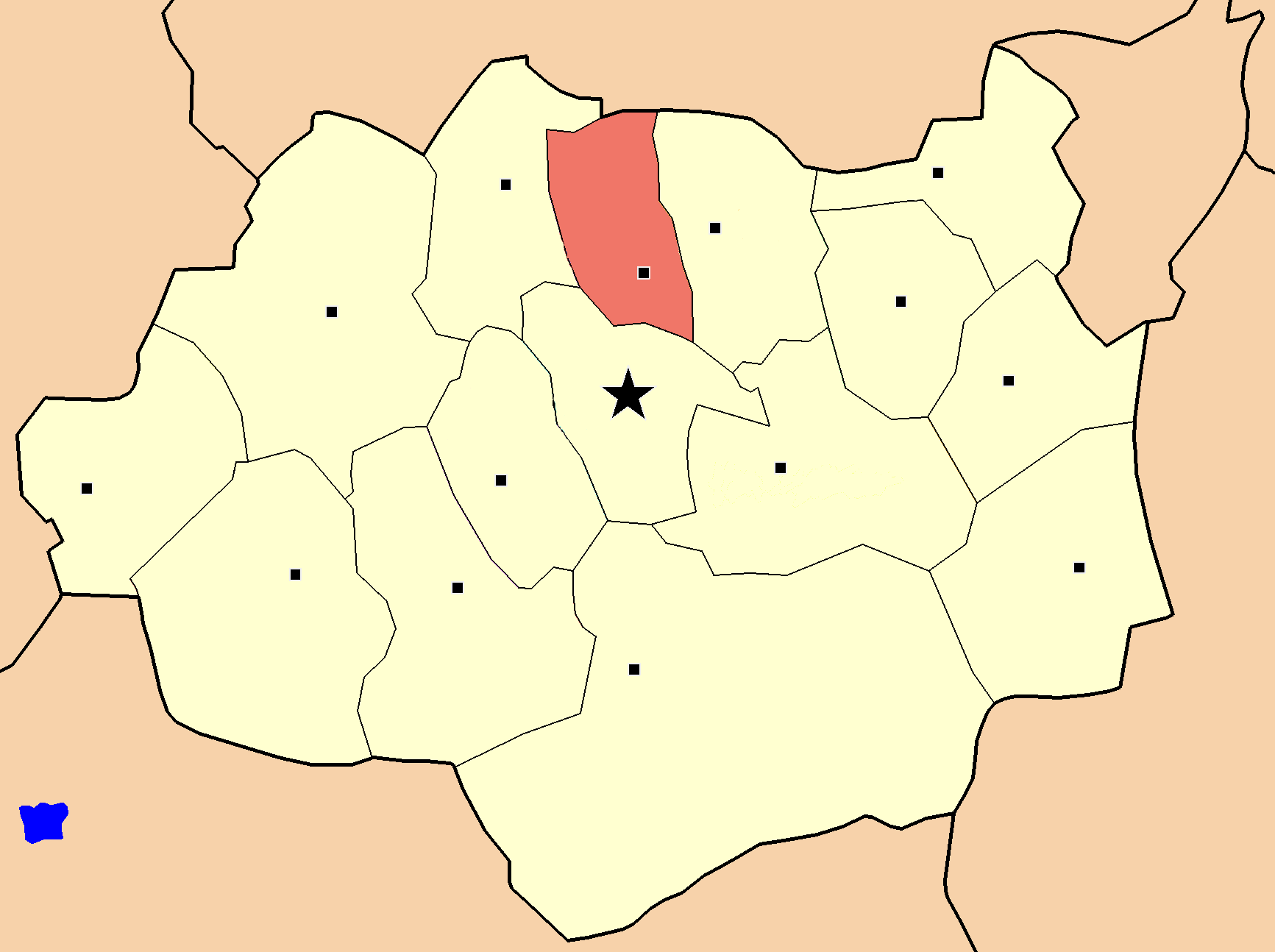
- Delgertsogt District in Dundgovi Province
- Country: Mongolia
- Province: Dundgovi Province

Area
  - Total: 2,492 km^{2} (962 sq mi)
- Time zone: UTC+8 (UTC + 8)

Delgertsogt (Mongolian: Дэлгэрцогт) is a sum (district) of Dundgovi Province in central Mongolia. In 2007, its population was 2,099.

== Administrative divisions ==
The district is divided into three bags, which are:

- Bayanbulag
- Delger-Emt
- Tsakhiurt
