= Gurvansaikhan, Dundgovi =

District in Dundgovi Province, Mongolia

Coordinates: 45°31′53″N 107°02′40″E

Gurvansaikhan District Гурвансайхан сум ᠭᠤᠷᠪᠠᠩᠰᠠᠶᠢᠬᠠᠨᠰᠤᠮᠤ
- District
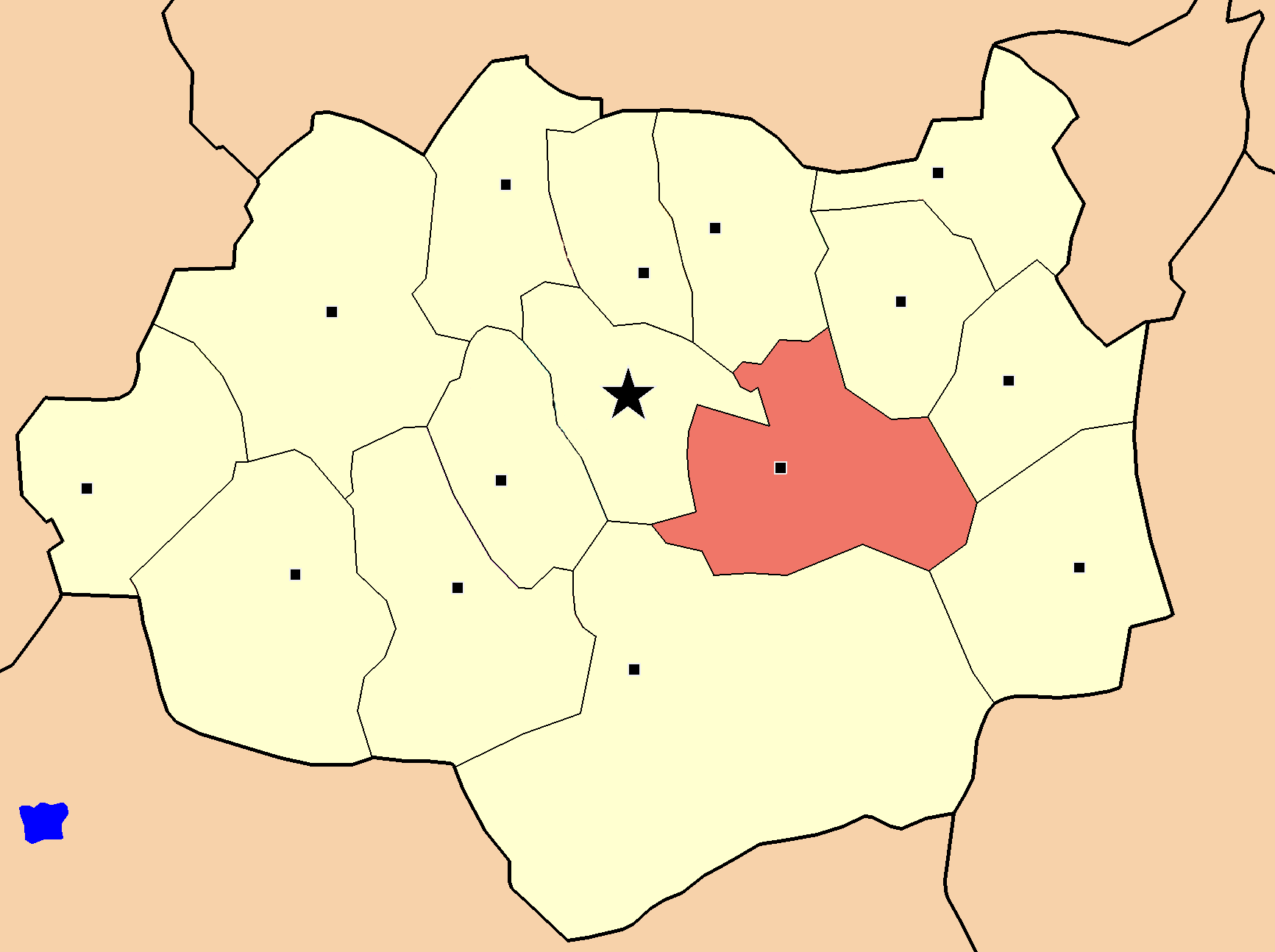
- Gurvansaikhan District in Dundgovi Province
- Country: Mongolia
- Province: Dundgovi Province

Area
  - Total: 5,416 km^{2} (2,091 sq mi)
- Time zone: UTC+8 (UTC + 8)

Gurvansaikhan (Mongolian: Гурвансайхан, Three beauty) is a sum (district) of Dundgovi Province in central Mongolia. In 2007, its population was 2,578.

== Administrative divisions ==
The district is divided into five bags, which are:

- Chuluut
- Dersene Us
- Elgen
- Gurvansaikhan
- Suugaant
