= Bayanjargalan, Dundgovi =

District in Dundgovi Province, Mongolia

Coordinates: 45°45′24″N 107°59′35″E

Bayanjargalan District Баянжаргалан сум ᠪᠠᠶ᠋ᠠᠨᠵᠢᠷᠭᠠᠯᠠᠩᠰᠤᠮᠤ
- District
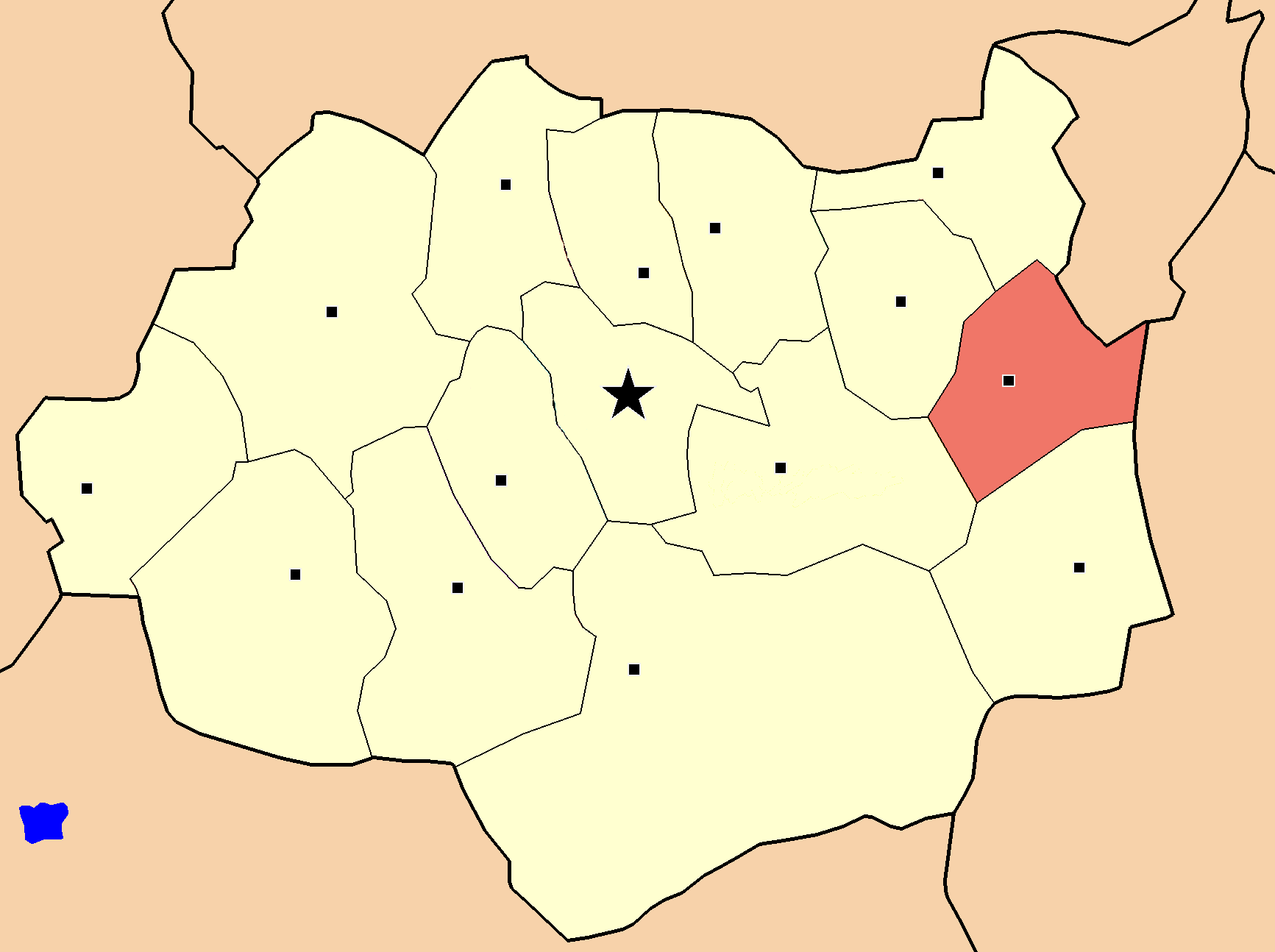
- Bayanjargalan District in Dundgovi Province
- Country: Mongolia
- Province: Dundgovi Province

Area
  - Total: 3,189 km^{2} (1,231 sq mi)
- Time zone: UTC+8 (UTC + 8)

Bayanjargalan (Mongolian: Баянжаргалан, Rich happiness) is a sum (district) of Dundgovi Province in central Mongolia. In 2007, its population was 1,305. It is approximately 53 kilometres (33 mi) away from the sum of Govi-Ugtaal and approximately 24 km (15 mi) away from the small village Zagaskhudaldaa.

== Administrative divisions ==
The district is divided into three bags, which are:

- Argatai
- Enger-Us
- Shiliin Gol
