= Öndörshil, Dundgovi =

District in Dundgovi Province, Mongolia

Coordinates: 45°13′52″N 108°17′02″E

Öndörshil District Өндөршил сум ᠥᠨᠳᠦᠷᠰᠢᠯᠢᠰᠤᠮᠤ
- District
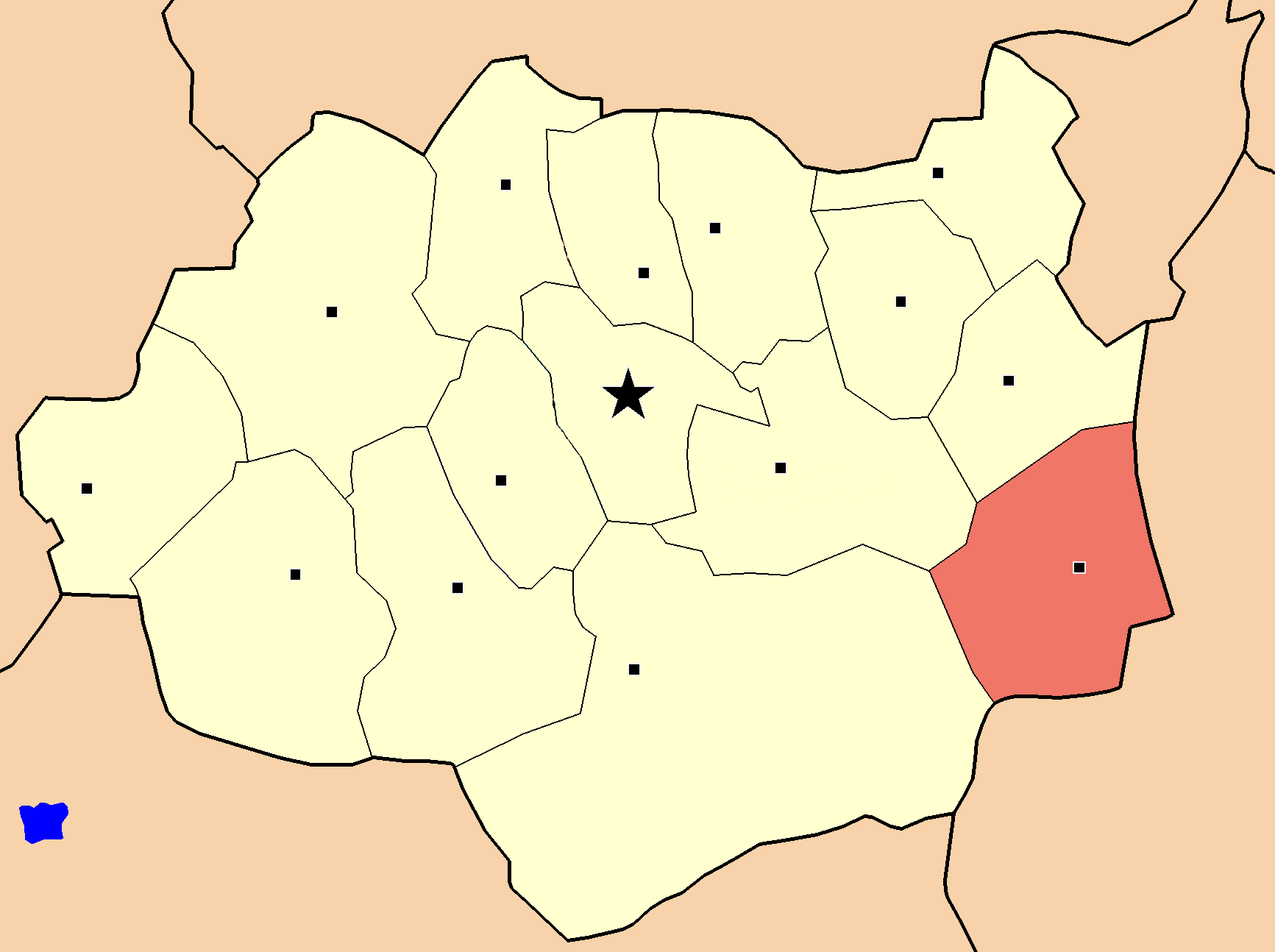
- Öndörshil District in Dundgovi Province
- Country: Mongolia
- Province: Dundgovi Province

Area
  - Total: 4,852 km^{2} (1,873 sq mi)
- Time zone: UTC+8 (UTC + 8)

Öndörshil (Mongolian: Өндөршил) is a sum (district) of Dundgovi Province in central Mongolia. In 2007, its population was 1,616.

== Administrative divisions ==
The district is divided into three bags, which are:

- Bukht
- Taliin nar
- Tsog

== Economy ==
The district is home to the Övdög Khudag coal mine.
