= Adaatsag, Dundgovi =

District in Dundgovi Province, Mongolia

Coordinates: 46°23′30″N 105°44′17″E

Adaatsag District Адаацаг сум ᠠᠳᠠᠭᠠᠴᠠᠭᠰᠤᠮᠤ
- District
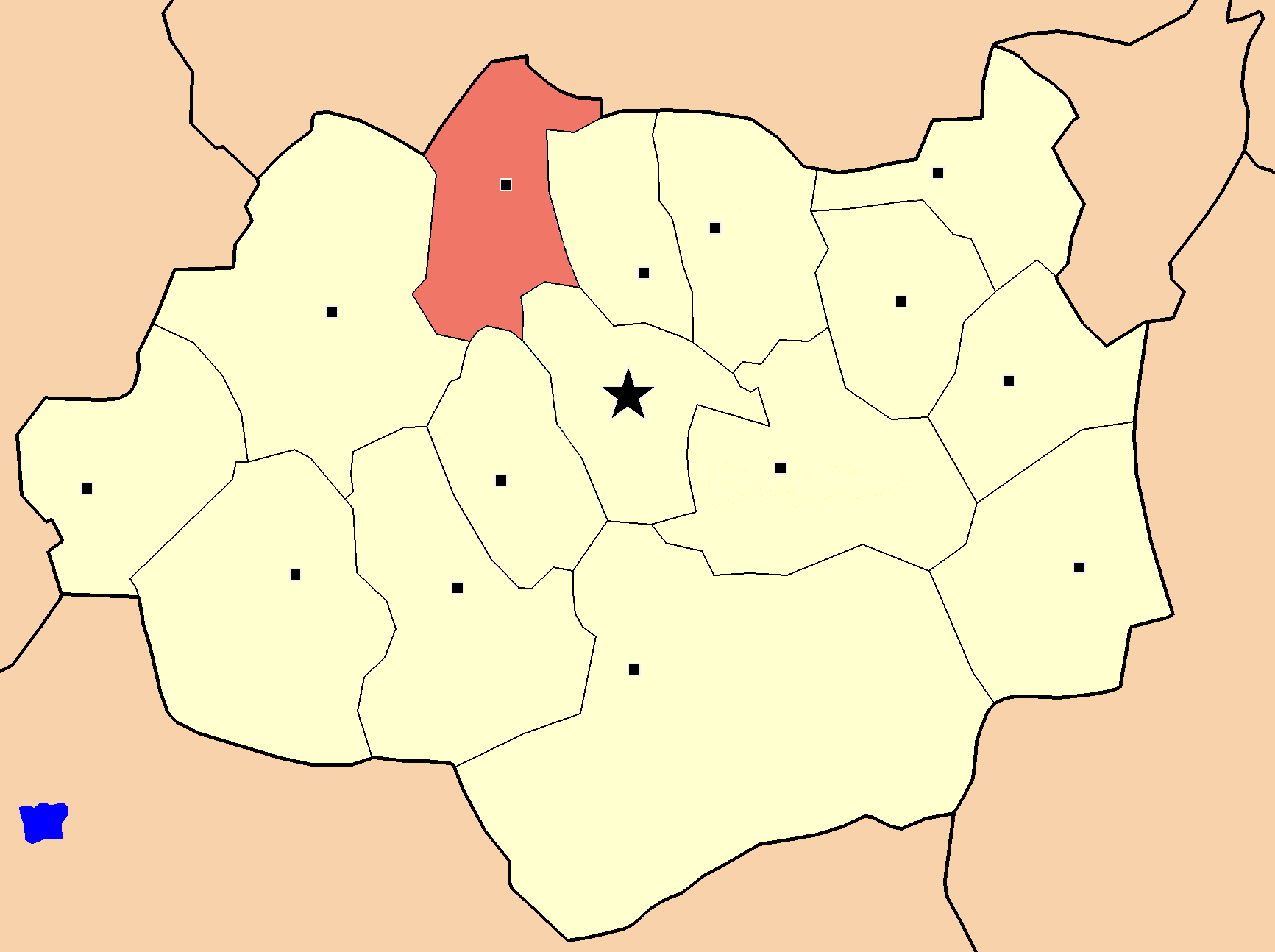
- Adaatsag District in Dundgovi Province
- Country: Mongolia
- Province: Dundgovi Province

Area
  - Total: 3,309 km^{2} (1,278 sq mi)
- Time zone: UTC+8 (UTC + 8)

Adaatsag (Mongolian: Адаацаг) is a sum (district) of Dundgovi Province in central Mongolia. In 2007, its population was 3,238.

== Administrative divisions ==
The district is divided into five bags, which are:

- Ar-Urt
- Khashaat
- Sum
- Tavin
- Uvur-Urt
