= Luus, Dundgovi =

District in Dundgovi Province, Mongolia

Coordinates: 45°30′23″N 105°45′24″E

Luus District Луус сум ᠯᠤᠤᠰᠰᠤᠮᠤ
- District
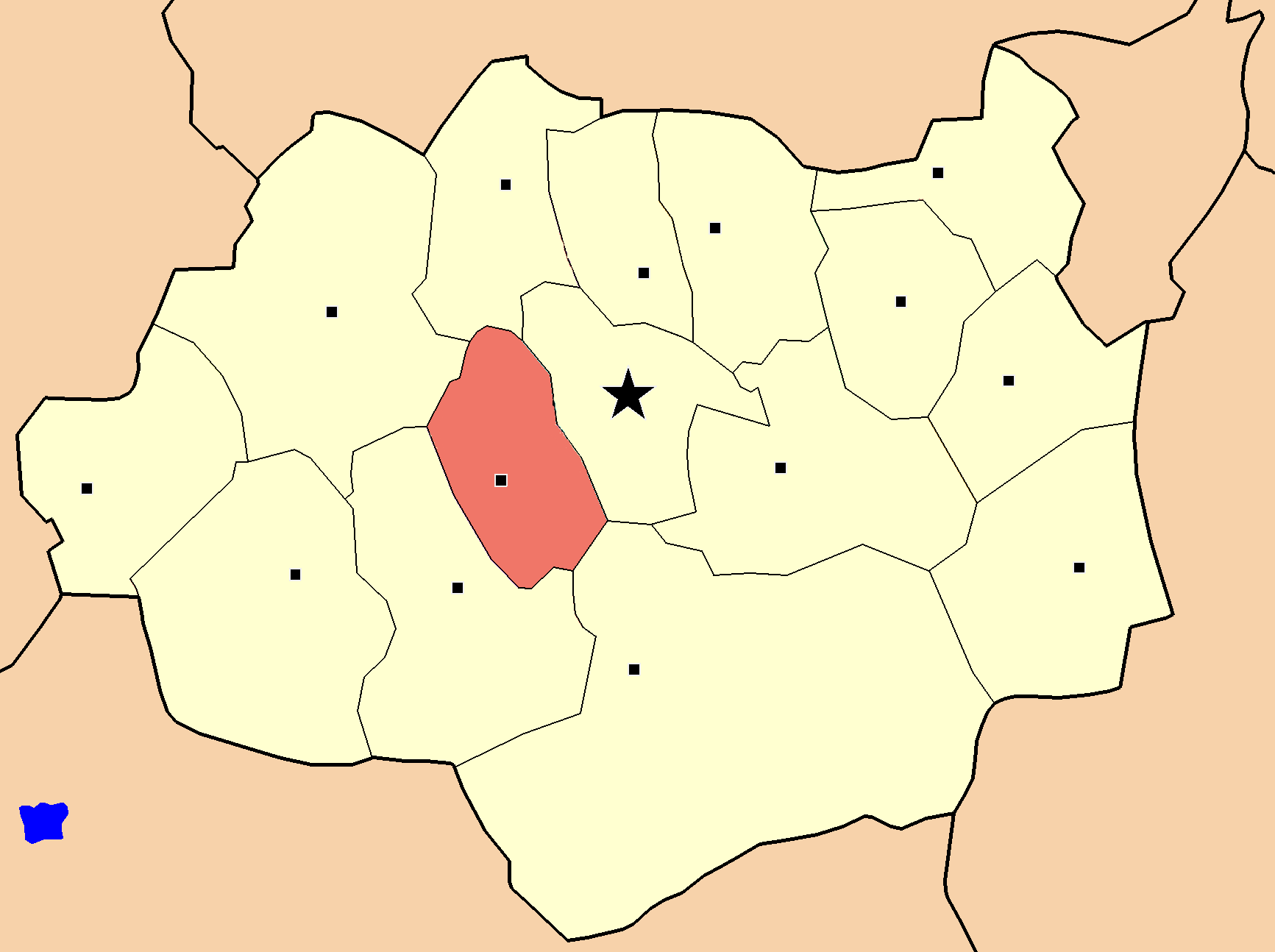
- Luus District in Dundgovi Province
- Country: Mongolia
- Province: Dundgovi Province

Area
  - Total: 3,161 km^{2} (1,220 sq mi)
- Time zone: UTC+8 (UTC + 8)

Luus (Mongolian: Луус) is a sum (district) of Dundgovi Province in central Mongolia. In 2007, its population was 2,106.

== Administrative divisions ==
The district is divided into three bags, which are:

- Buyant
- Naran
- Suvarga
