= Govi-Ugtaal =

District in Dundgovi Province, Mongolia

Coordinates: 46°02′53″N 107°29′25″E

Govi-Ugtaal District Говь-Угтаал сум ᠭᠣᠪᠢᠤᠭᠲᠠᠭᠠᠯᠰᠤᠮᠤ
- District
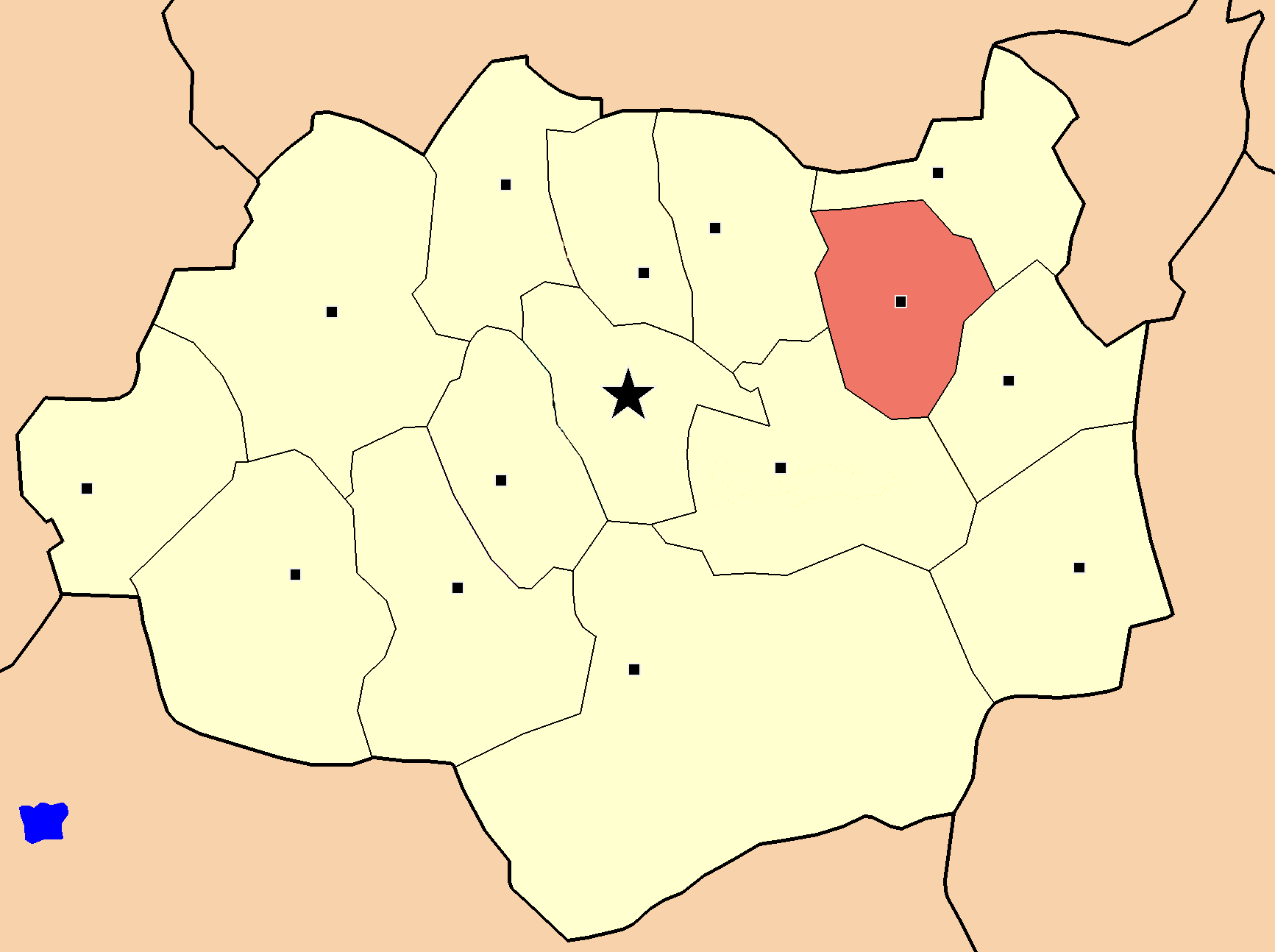
- Govi-Ugtaal District in Dundgovi Province
- Country: Mongolia
- Province: Dundgovi Province

Area
  - Total: 2,707 km^{2} (1,045 sq mi)
- Time zone: UTC+8 (UTC + 8)

Govi-Ugtaal (Mongolian: Говь-Угтаал, Gobi meet) is a sum (district) of Dundgovi Province in central Mongolia. In 2007, its population was 1,714.

== Administrative divisions ==
The district is divided into four bags, which are:

- Ajirkhai
- Khongor
- Morit
- Urnult
