= Ölziit, Dundgovi =

District in Dundgovi Province, Mongolia

Coordinates: 44°56′38″N 106°19′23″E

Ölziit District Өлзийт сум ᠥᠯᠵᠡᠶᠢᠲᠦᠰᠤᠮᠤ
- District
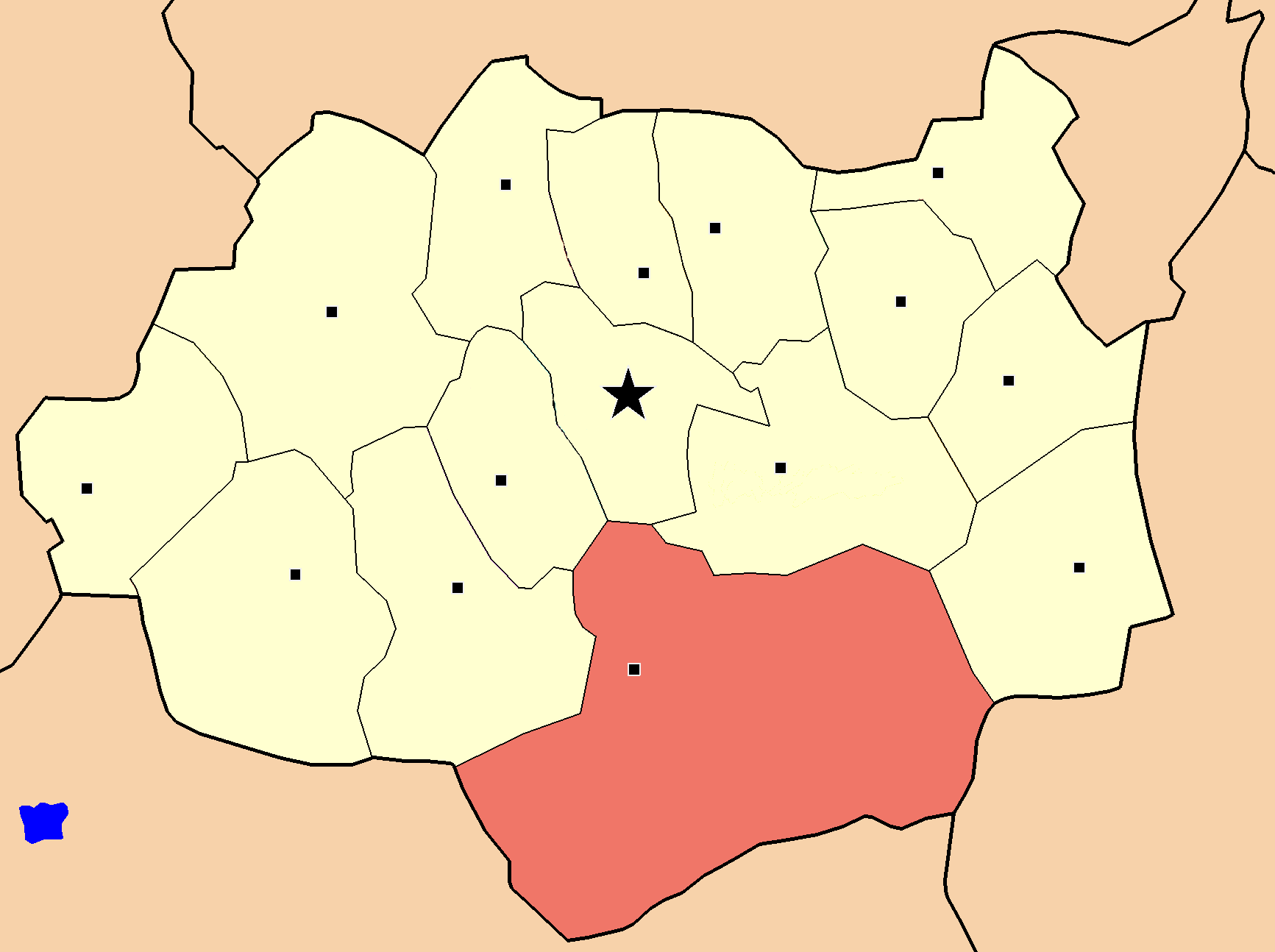
- Ölziit District in Dundgovi Province
- Country: Mongolia
- Province: Dundgovi Province

Area
  - Total: 15,421 km^{2} (5,954 sq mi)
- Time zone: UTC+8 (UTC + 8)

Ölziit (Mongolian: Өлзийт) is a sum (district) of Dundgovi Province in central Mongolia. In 2007, its population was 2,690.

== Administrative divisions ==
The district is divided into six bags, which are:

- Buyant-1
- Buyant-2
- Dert-1
- Dert-2
- Rashaant
- Tagt
