= Mandalgovi =

District in Dundgovi Province, Mongolia

Mandalgovi Мандалговь ᠮᠠᠨᠳᠠᠯᠭᠣᠪᠢ
- District
- Saintsagaan District; Сайнцагаан сум ᠰᠠᠶᠢᠩᠴᠠᠭᠠᠨᠰᠤᠮᠤ
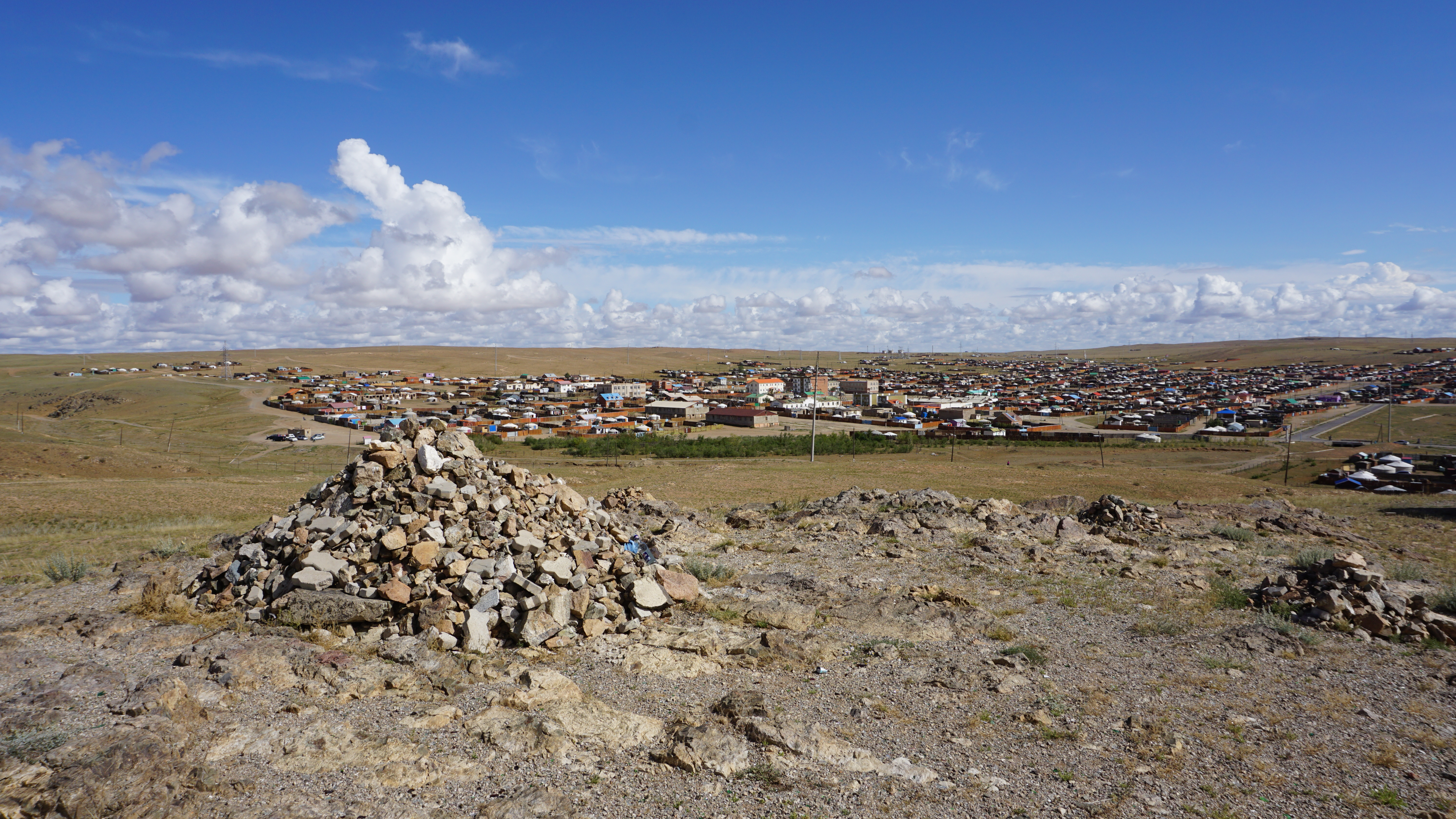
- General view of Mandalgovi

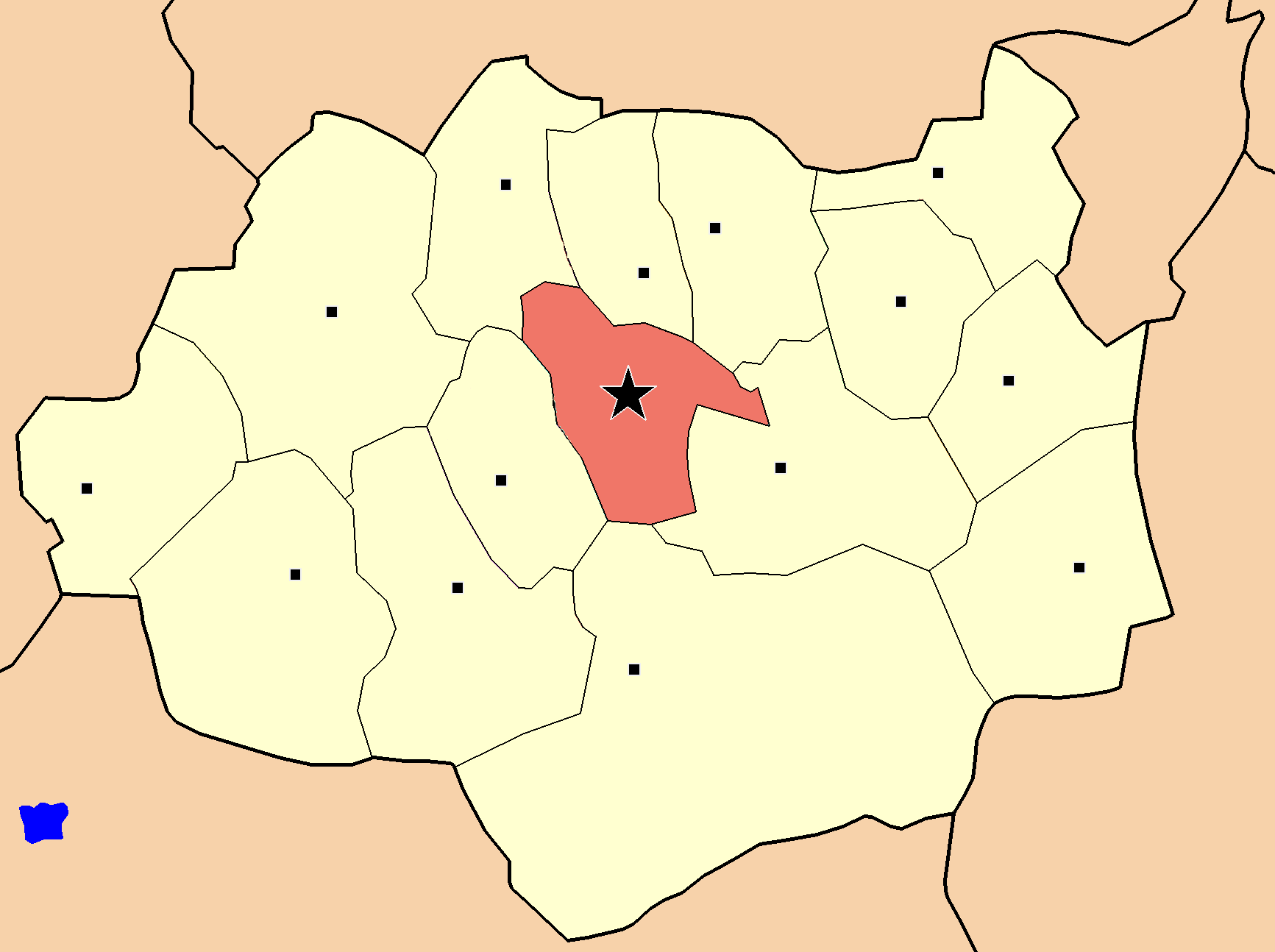
- Mandalgovi in Dundgovi Province

- Location within Mongolia
- Coordinates: 45°46′0″N 106°16′11″E
- Country: Mongolia
- Province: Dundgovi Province

Area
  - Total: 11 km^{2} (4.2 sq mi)
- Elevation: 1,395 m (4,577 ft)

Population (2017)
  - Total: 12,339
  - Density: 1,100/km^{2} (2,900/sq mi)
- Time zone: UTC+8 (UTC + 8)

Mandalgovi (Mongolian: Мандалговь; ᠮᠠᠨᠳᠠᠯᠭᠣᠪᠢ; also Mandalgov' or Mandalgobi) is the capital of the Dundgovi Province of Mongolia, about 300 km south of Ulaanbaatar on the border of the Gobi Desert. It has 10,506 inhabitants (2005), 10,299 (2007). The city administrative unit's official name is Saintsagaan sum.

== History ==
Mandalgovi was originally a village when it consisted only of 40 yurts. In 1942, it was gained status as a town.

== Climate ==
Mandalgovi has a cold arid climate (Köppen BWk) with warm summers and frigid winters. Most precipitation falls in the summer as rain. Winters are very dry.

Climate data for Mandalgovi, elevation 1,393 m (4,570 ft), (1991–2020 normals, extremes 1944–present)
Month	Jan	Feb	Mar	Apr	May	Jun	Jul	Aug	Sep	Oct	Nov	Dec	Year
Record high °C (°F)	4.1 (39.4)	16.0 (60.8)	21.3 (70.3)	29.9 (85.8)	35.3 (95.5)	36.8 (98.2)	39.6 (103.3)	38.3 (100.9)	32.4 (90.3)	23.6 (74.5)	14.0 (57.2)	7.5 (45.5)	39.6 (103.3)
Mean daily maximum °C (°F)	−10.7 (12.7)	−5.5 (22.1)	3.1 (37.6)	12.5 (54.5)	19.7 (67.5)	25.3 (77.5)	27.4 (81.3)	25.2 (77.4)	19.3 (66.7)	10.0 (50.0)	−1.2 (29.8)	−9.2 (15.4)	9.7 (49.4)
Daily mean °C (°F)	−17.1 (1.2)	−12.7 (9.1)	−4.5 (23.9)	4.7 (40.5)	12.0 (53.6)	18.3 (64.9)	20.8 (69.4)	18.6 (65.5)	12.1 (53.8)	2.7 (36.9)	−7.8 (18.0)	−15.3 (4.5)	2.7 (36.8)
Mean daily minimum °C (°F)	−22.4 (−8.3)	−18.7 (−1.7)	−11.1 (12.0)	−2.3 (27.9)	4.9 (40.8)	11.8 (53.2)	14.9 (58.8)	12.8 (55.0)	5.7 (42.3)	−3.3 (26.1)	−13.2 (8.2)	−20.3 (−4.5)	−3.4 (25.8)
Record low °C (°F)	−37.8 (−36.0)	−37.2 (−35.0)	−35 (−31)	−21.1 (−6.0)	−12.2 (10.0)	−3.9 (25.0)	3.9 (39.0)	2.0 (35.6)	−12.0 (10.4)	−22.5 (−8.5)	−34 (−29)	−35.3 (−31.5)	−37.8 (−36.0)
Average precipitation mm (inches)	2 (0.1)	1 (0.0)	2 (0.1)	5 (0.2)	9 (0.4)	20 (0.8)	39 (1.5)	38 (1.5)	8 (0.3)	5 (0.2)	2 (0.1)	1 (0.0)	132 (5.2)
Average precipitation days (≥ 1.0 mm)	1.5	1.1	1.3	1.9	2.2	4.3	6.4	5.6	2.3	1.5	1.8	1.1	31.1
Average relative humidity (%)	67.9	59.9	47.3	37.6	36.6	42.1	49.7	51.3	44.8	47.9	59.3	67.5	51.0
Percentage possible sunshine	66	64	49	39	40	43	51	52	47	44	56	67	52
Source 1: Pogoda.ru.net
Source 2: NOAA (1991-2020), Deutscher Wetterdienst (percent sun 1944-1963)

== Administrative divisions ==
The district is divided into nine bags, which are:

- Airag
- Arvijih
- Borjigon
- Dalai
- Mandal
- Naran
- Narlag
- Tevsh
- Uizen

== Tourist attractions ==
- Museum of Dundgovi Province

== Infrastructure ==
- Mandalgovi–Ulaanbaatar Transmission Line

== Transportation ==
The city is connected to Ulaanbaatar by a 300 km paved road completed in October 2013.
