= Ölziit, Övörkhangai =

District in Övörkhangai Province, Mongolia

Coordinates: 46°36′35″N 103°32′56″E

Ölziit District Өлзийт сум ᠥᠯᠵᠡᠶᠢᠲᠦᠰᠤᠮᠤ
- District
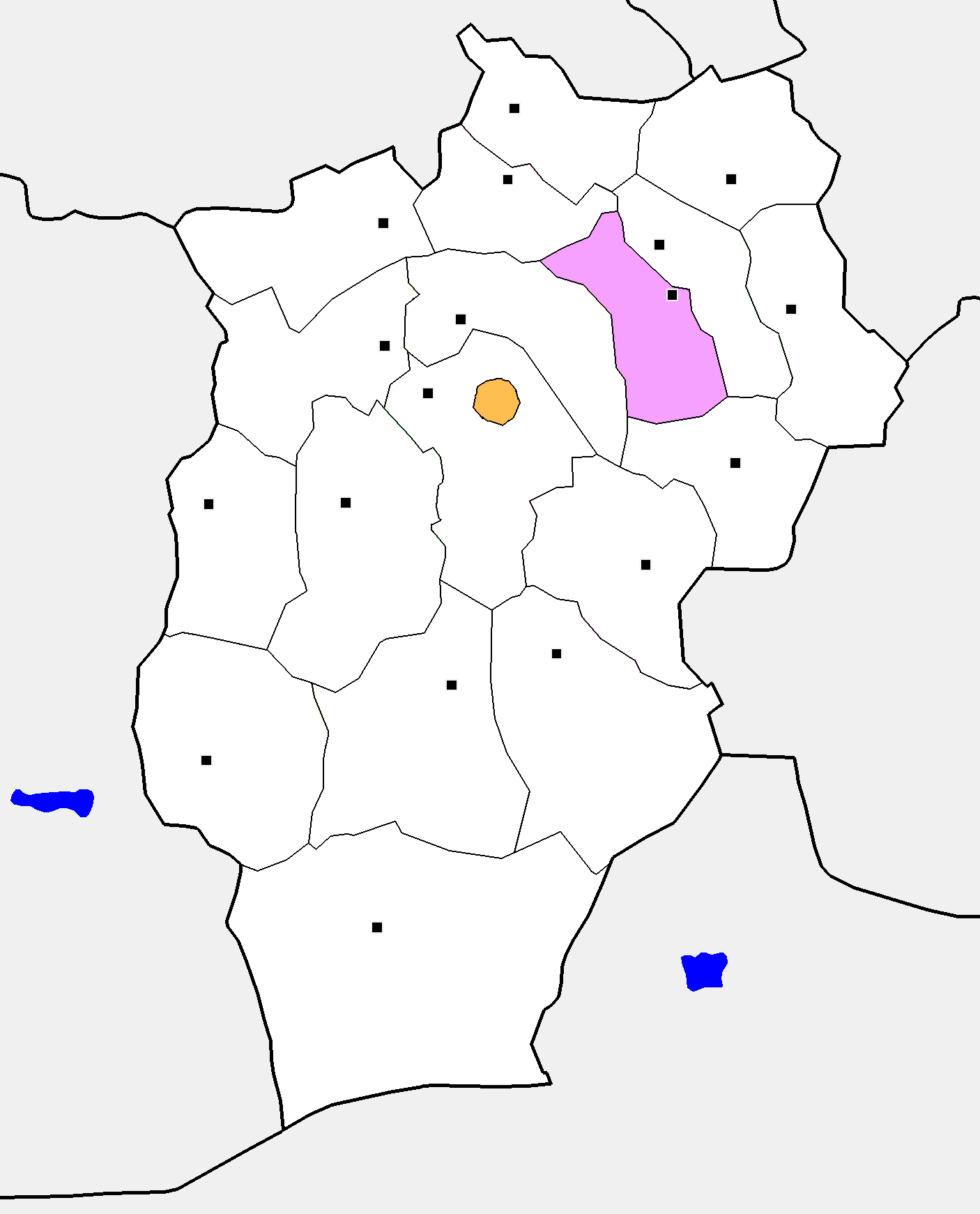
- Ölziit District in Övörkhangai Province
- Country: Mongolia
- Province: Övörkhangai Province
- Time zone: UTC+8 (UTC + 8)

Ölziit (Mongolian: Өлзийт "Auspicious Place") is a sum (district) of Övörkhangai Province in southern Mongolia. In 2008, its population was 2,741.

== Administrative divisions ==
The district is divided into four bags, which are:

- Aguit
- Bor Khoshuut
- Guulin
- Yargait
