= Dundgovi Province =

Province (aimag) of Mongolia

Dundgovi Province Дундговь аймаг ᠳᠤᠮᠳᠠᠭᠣᠪᠢᠠᠶᠢᠮᠠᠭ
- Province
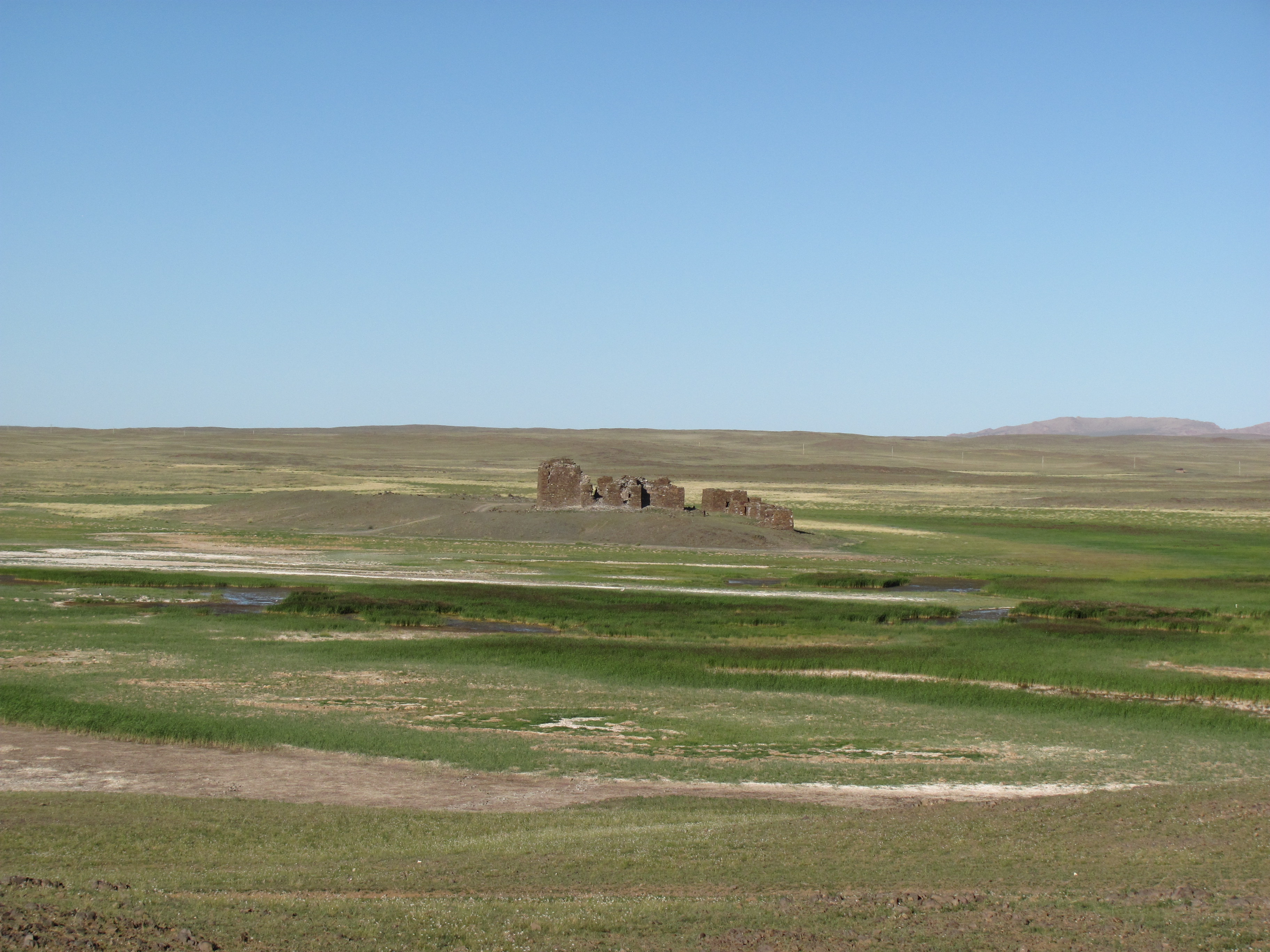
- Süm Khökh Burd temple

- Flag Coat of arms

- Coordinates: 45°46′N 106°17′E
- Country: Mongolia
- Established: 1942
- Capital: Mandalgovi

Area
  - Total: 74,690.32 km^{2} (28,838.09 sq mi)
- Elevation: 1,412 m (4,633 ft)

Population (2025)
  - Total: 45,877
  - Rank: 20th
  - Density: 0.61423/km^{2} (1.5908/sq mi)

GDP
  - Total: MNT 415 billion US$ 0.1 billion (2022)
  - Per capita: MNT 8,759,250; US$ 2,804 (2022)
- Time zone: UTC+8
- Area code: +976 (0)159
- ISO 3166 code: MN-059
- Vehicle registration: ДУ_
- Website: dundgovi.gov.mn/en/index.php

Dundgovi or Dundgobi (Mongolian: Дундговь, Middle Gobi) is one of the 21 aimags (provinces) of Mongolia. It is located in the south of the country, approximately 245 kilometers (152 mi) south of Ulaanbaatar. Its capital is Mandalgovi. Dundgovi is the second least populated province.

== Climate ==
Dundgovi province is situated in the south of the country about 240 kilometres or 150 miles from capital city Ulaanbaatar. It consists largely of semi-arid steppe and low hills. Temperatures in the summer may top 32 °C or 90 °F, while winter temperatures may dip below −30 °C or −22 °F. Precipitation is scarce, and air humidity is low.

Seasonal climatic problems include spring sandstorms and winter zud.

== Transportation ==
There is no commercial air transport to the Dundgobi province. Public transportation includes bus but many of the more rural sums are not on the mass transport lines. Much travel is done via mikrs (micro-bus or Russian furgon) or by private jeeps. The capital, Mandalgovi, is connected to Ulaanbaatar by a 300 km (190 mi) paved road completed in 2013.

Many locals own 250 cc motorcycles, which they use as their main mode of transportation.

== Economy ==
The province's main industry is animal husbandry and livestock products (such as wool, cashmere). The Dundgobi province is also noted among Mongolian locals for its airag (fermented horse milk), a traditional Mongolian alcoholic drink. In 2018, the province contributed to 1.00% of the total national GDP of Mongolia.

== Administrative subdivisions ==
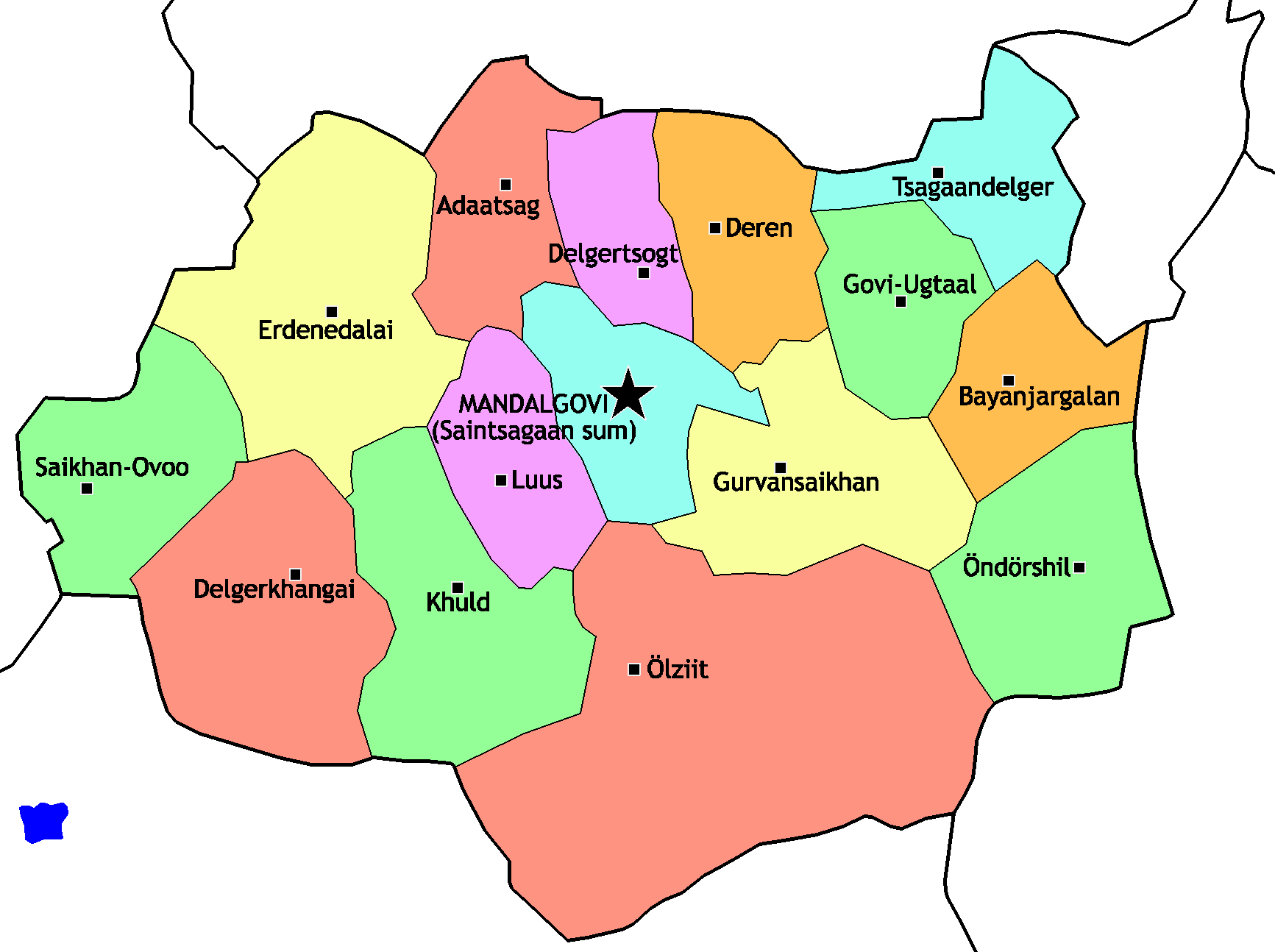
Sums of Dundgovi

The Sums of Dundgovi Aimag
Sum	Mongolian	Population (1994)	Population (2005)	Population (2007)	Area (km^{2})	Density (/km^{2})	Sum centre population (2007)
Adaatsag	Адаацаг	2,772	3,202	3,238	3,309	0.98	506
Bayanjargalan	Баянжаргалан	1,543	1,213	1,305	3,189	0.41	462
Delgerkhangai	Дэлгэрхангай	2,721	2,506	2,530	6,209	0.41	802
Delgertsogt	Дэлгэрцогт	2,585	2,251	2,099	2,492	0.84	587
Deren	Дэрэн	2,330	2,492	2,408	3,624	0.66	502
Erdenedalai	Эрдэнэдалай	6,603	6,712	6,677	7,351	0.91	2,058
Govi-Ugtaal	Говь-Угтаал	1,748	1,681	1,714	2,707	0.63	1,022
Gurvansaikhan	Гурвансайхан	2,407	2,726	2,578	5,416	0.48	491
Khuld	Хулд	2,478	2,551	2,458	6,070	0.40	366
Luus	Луус	2,037	2,050	2,106	3,161	0.67	512
Ölziit	Өлзийт	2,818	2,800	2,690	15,421	0.17	483
Öndörshil	Өндөршил	1,439	1,625	1,616	4,852	0.33	652
Saikhan-Ovoo	Сайхан-Овоо	2,698	2,692	2,551	4,055	0.63	598
Saintsagaan	Сайнцагаан	14,990	14,090	13,703	3,406	4.02	10,299 *
Tsagaandelger	Цагаандэлгэр	1,713	1,323	1,319	3,428	0.38	414

^{*} Sum centre is aimag capital Mandalgovi (Mongolian: Мандалговь)
